= Lagg =

Lagg may refer to:

- Lagg, Arran, North Ayrshire, Scotland
  - Lagg distillery, closed in 1837, see Arran distillery
  - Lagg distillery, opened in 2019
- Lagg, Jura, Argyll and Bute, Scotland
- Lagg (landform)
- Lavochkin-Gorbunov-Gudkov LaGG-1, a Soviet fighter aircraft of World War II
- Lavochkin-Gorbunov-Gudkov LaGG-3, a Soviet fighter aircraft of World War II

== See also ==
- Lag (disambiguation)
