= Scheduled monuments in North Ayrshire =

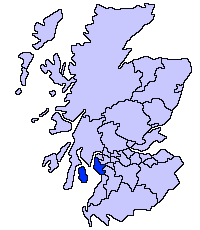
North Ayrshire shown within Scotland

A scheduled monument in Scotland is a nationally important archaeological site or monument which is given legal protection by being placed on a list (or "schedule") maintained by Historic Environment Scotland. The aim of scheduling is to preserve the country's most significant sites and monuments as far as possible in the form in which they have been inherited.

The process of scheduling is governed by the Ancient Monuments and Archaeological Areas Act 1979, which aims "to make provision for the investigation, preservation and recording of matters of archaeological or historical interest". The term "scheduled monument" can apply to the whole range of archaeological sites which have been deliberately constructed by human activity but are not always visible above ground. They range from prehistoric standing stones and burial sites, through Roman remains and medieval structures such as castles and monasteries, to later structures such as industrial sites and buildings constructed for the World Wars. Some buildings or structures which were both scheduled and listed have had their listing designations removed to reduce the duplication.

In 2017 there were 8,238 scheduled monuments in Scotland.

== Notable scheduled monuments in North Ayrshire ==
Name	Location	Description	Ref No	Image
Fairlie Castle	Largs	Restored oblong tower castle	SM317	
Glengarnock Castle	Kilbirnie	Ruined castle	SM318	
Seagate Castle	Irvine	Ruined 16th-century castle	SM320	
Portencross Castle	Portencross	Ruined L-plan 14th-century stronghold	SM327	
Giants' Graves, Arran	Kilbride, Isle of Arran	Two chambered Clyde type long cairns	SM398	
Meallach's Grave	Kilbride	Long cairn in Monamore Glen	SM403	
Little Cumbrae Lighthouse	Cumbrae	Ruined 200-year-old coal-fire lighthouse	SM418	
Little Cumbrae Castle	Cumbrae	Ruined 14th-century tower on an islet	SM2195	
Haylie House Cairn	Largs	Neolithic chambered cairn near Haylie House	SM2482	
Ardrossan Castle	Ardrossan	Ruined 15th-century hilltop castle	SM3383	
Montfode Castle	Ardrossan	Ruined 16th-century tower	SM5816	
Auchagallon Stone Circle	Machrie, Kilmory, Arran	Bronze Age kerbed cairn resembling a stone circle	SM90023	
Carn Ban	Kilmory, Arran	Long Neolithic chambered cairn	SM90051	
Kilwinning Abbey	Kilwinning	Ruins of a Tironensian Abbey	SM90187	
Lochranza Castle	Kilmory, Arran	Ruined 13th/14th-century castle	SM90206	
Torrylin Cairn	Kilmory, Arran	Neolithic chambered cairn	SM90307	

== See also ==
- List of Category A listed buildings in North Ayrshire
- List of listed buildings in North Ayrshire
