= List of shipwrecks in January 1873 =

The list of shipwrecks in January 1873 includes ships sunk, foundered, grounded, or otherwise lost during January 1873.

== 1 January ==
List of shipwrecks: 1 January 1873
Ship	State	Description
Clyde	United Kingdom	The steamship ran aground, capsized and sank at Leith, Lothian. Her crew were rescued. She was on a voyage from Glasgow, Renfrewshire to Leith.
Flying Cloud, and Louise Angelo	United Kingdom; France	The brig Flying Cloud collided with the schooner Louise Amelie and sank off Ouessant, Finistère. Her crew were rescued by Star of Persia (United Kingdom). Louise Angelo was severely damaged. She was on a voyage from Les Sables-d'Olonne, Vendée to Glasgow. She put in to Cherbourg, Manche.
Two Brothers	United Kingdom	The smack was run ashore at Yorkshire. She was refloated. Her captain was acquitted of a charge of wilfully running her ashore and failing to do his best to preserve life and property, contrary to Section 239 of the Merchant Shipping Act 1854.
Tuscarora	United States	The ship foundered in the Atlantic Ocean 25 nautical miles (46 km) off Lisbon, Portugal with the loss of seventeen of her 27 crew. Survivors were rescued the steamship Express (United Kingdom). Tuscarora was on a voyage from Mobile, Alabama to Liverpool, Lancashire, United Kingdom.
Western Star	United Kingdom	The schooner was driven ashore at Wembury, Devon. Her crew were rescued.
Unnamed	Flag unknown	The schooner collided with the steamship Gazelle (United Kingdom) and sank in the Crosby Channel.

== 2 January ==
List of shipwrecks: 2 January 1873
Ship	State	Description
Ancilla	United Kingdom	The ship ran aground on the "St. Helen's Bar". She was on a voyage from the Bull River to Belfast, County Antrim. She was refloated and found to be leaky.
Ann	United Kingdom	The ship ran aground near Corran, Inverness-shire. She was on a voyage from Riga, Russia to Belfast, County Antrim. She was refloated and taken in to Corran.
Bjorn	Norway	The barque was abandoned in the Atlantic Ocean. She was on a voyage from Philadelphia, Pennsylvania to Queenstown, County Cork, United Kingdom.
Caspar	United Kingdom	The ship ran aground on the Monkstone, in the Bristol Channel off the coast of Glamorgan. She was on a voyage from Shediac, New Brunswick, Canada to Gloucester. She was refloated and taken in to Bristol, Gloucestershire in a leaky condition.
Erie	United States	The steamship was destroyed by fire off Pernambuco, Brazil. All on board were rescued. She was on a voyage from Rio de Janeiro, Brazil to New York.
Norrie Kirwan	United Kingdom	The ship was driven ashore at Sutton, County Dublin. Her crew were rescued. She was on a voyage from New Ross, County Wexford to Waterford.
Peru	United Kingdom	The full-rigged ship collided with Empire (United States) in the English Channel 16 nautical miles (30 km) off Portland, Dorset and was severely damaged. No further trace.
Recompense	United Kingdom	The schooner collided with a smack and was run ashore at Littlestone, Kent. She was on a voyage from Trouville-sur-Mer, France to South Shields, County Durham.
Western Star	United Kingdom	The schooner was driven ashore at Wembury, Devon. Her crew were rescued. She was on a voyage from Zakynthos, Greece to Plymouth, Devon.

== 3 January ==
List of shipwrecks: 3 January 1873
Ship	State	Description
Angelov	Italy	The barque was driven ashore at Moville, County Donegal, United Kingdom.
Aurora	Norway	The ship ran aground on the Tjombaaern. She was refloated and assisted in the Vallø, Denmark.
Bismarck	Portugal	The schooner collided with the steamship Tagus (Portugal) and sank off Belém.
Cintra	United Kingdom	The steamship was driven ashore at Cabodello Point, Portugal. She was on a voyage from Liverpool, Lancashire to Porto, Portugal. She was refloated on 26 February.
Isabetita	Germany	The ship ran aground on the Goodwin Sands, Kent, United Kingdom. She was on a voyage from Hamburg to Havana, Cuba. She was refloated and towed in to Ramsgate, Kent in a leaky condition.
Sir Francis	United Kingdom	The steamship was driven ashore and wrecked at Hampton, New Jersey, United States. All on board were rescued. She was on a voyage from Liverpool, Lancashire to Boston, Massachusetts, United States.

== 4 January ==
List of shipwrecks: 4 January 1873
Ship	State	Description
Carmen	Norway	The barque was abandoned in the Atlantic Ocean with the loss of two of her crew. Survivors were rescued by the steamship Adriatic (United Kingdom). Carmen was on a voyage from Saint George, New Brunswick, Canada to Liverpool, Lancashire, United Kingdom.
H. L. Gilliatt	Canada	The brig was wrecked on reefs off Cape Breton Island, Nova Scotia. Her crew were rescued. She was on a voyage from Cardiff, Glamorgan, United Kingdom to Cienfuegos, Cuba.
Santa Anta	Spain	The brig was wrecked on Amrum, Germany. She was on a voyage from Manzanillo, Cuba to Bremen, Germany.

== 5 January ==
List of shipwrecks: 5 January 1873
Ship	State	Description
Helena	Germany	The schooner collided with the steamship Isabel (France) and sank with the loss of all but her captain. Helena was on a voyage from a Dutch port to Cardiff, Glamorgan, United Kingdom.
J. Steel, and Lucide	United Kingdom	The schooner Lucide collided with the barque J. Steel at Queenstown, County Cork and both vessels were damaged. They collided again the next day; J. Steel was severely damaged at the stern, Lucide was severely damaged at the bows.
Killala	United Kingdom	The steamship foundered in the North Sea. Her crew were rescued by the steamship Norman (United Kingdom). Killala was on a voyage from Harlingen, Friesland, Netherlands to Leith, Lothian.
Sisters	United Kingdom	The brigantine caught fire in The Downs and sank. Her six crew were rescued. She was on a voyage from Hartlepool, County Durham to Dieppe, Seine-Inférieure, France.
Valid	United Kingdom	The brig was wrecked off St. Catherine's Point, Isle of Wight with the loss of all nine crew. She came ashore at "Rockin End", Isle of Wight. She was on a voyage from Grenada to London.

== 6 January ==
List of shipwrecks: 6 January 1873
Ship	State	Description
Addison Gilbert	United States	The fishing schooner was sunk in a collision with sloop M. M. Hamilton (United States) in the harbor of Portsmouth, New Hampshire, a total loss. Crew got on board Hamilton as their ship sank.
Agnes	United Kingdom	The ship was wrecked at "Largsbeg", Isle of Arran. Her crew were rescued. She was on a voyage from Carrickfergus, County Antrim to Glasgow, Renfrewshire.
Anna Lassen	Sweden	The brig collided with the full-rigged ship Lake St. Clair (United Kingdom) and sank off Cape Finisterre, Spain with the loss of three of her ten crew. Survivors were rescued by Lake St. Clair. Anna Lassen was on a voyage from Gävle to New York, United States.
Charles	United Kingdom	The ship was wrecked on the Arklow Bank, in the Irish Sea off the coast of County Wicklow with the loss of all six crew. She was on a voyage from Dublin to Dundalk, County Louth.
Day Spring	New South Wales	The schooner was wrecked on a reef off "Aneilcum". All on board were rescued.
Eaglescliffe	United Kingdom	The steamship was sighted off Cromer, Norfolk whilst of a voyage from Middlesbrough, Yorkshire to Dunkirk, Nord, France. No further trace, presumed foundered with the loss of all ten crew.
Holsatia	Germany	The steamship ran aground in Plymouth Sound west of Drake's Island. Her 57 passengers were taken off by the tender Volunteer (Germany). Holsatia was on a voyage from New York to Hamburg. She was refloated and resumed her voyage.
Jane Harrison	United Kingdom	The ship was abandoned at sea. Her crew were rescued by Johannes (Norway). Jane Harrison was on a voyage from Liverpool, Lancashire to Valparaíso, Chile.
Marseilles	United Kingdom	The ship was wrecked on the Ridge, in Cloughty Bay. Her crew survived. She was on a voyage from Demerara, British Guiana to the Clyde. The derelict vessel was towed in to Rothesay Bay on 17 January by the tugs Flying Huntsman, Flying Meteor, Flying Sprite, and Flying Sylph (all United Kingdom). Marseille was towed in to Port Glasgow, Renfrewshire on 13 March.
St. Michael	Canada	The ship was wrecked at Skibbereen, County Cork.
Timandra	United Kingdom	The ship was driven ashore near Allonby, Cumberland. She was on a voyage from Belfast, County Antrim to Maryport, Cumberland.
Wallace	United States	The barque was destroyed by fire in Tor Bay. A crew member was reported missing. She was on a voyage from Antwerp, Belgium to Philadelphia, Pennsylvania.

== 7 January ==
List of shipwrecks: 7 January 1873
Ship	State	Description
Carbonic	United Kingdom	The steamship collided with another steamship in the Firth of Clyde 6 nautical miles (11 km) off the Cloch Lighthouse, Renfrewshire. She put in to Port Glasgow, Renfrewshire sinking at the bows.
Clara	United Kingdom	The barque ran aground in a cyclone at Mauritius. She was refloated.
Enterprise	United Kingdom	The ship was wrecked at Sagua la Grande, Cuba. She was on a voyage from the Clyde to a port in Cuba.
Margaret	New Zealand	The 22-ton cutter capsized close to Tokomaru Bay during a storm. Two of the four crew made it ashore safely, but the captain and mate were drowned.
Nimrod	Mauritius	The ship was driven ashore in a cyclone at Mauritius. She had been refloated by 22 February.
Pladda	United Kingdom	The steamship ran aground on the Goldestone Sands, off Emmanuel Head, Northumberland. A boat with eight people on board left the ship and reached the coast safely. Pladda was on a voyage from Dundee, Forfarshire to Newcastle upon Tyne, Northumberland. She was refloated and put in to Lindisfarne, Northumberland, where she sank. All on board were rescued.
Surcouf	France	The barque was wrecked on a reef off Nouméa, New Caledonia. Her crew were rescued. She was on a voyage from Newcastle, New South Wales to New Caledonia.
Unrestricted	United Kingdom	The brig was driven ashore at "Whitewall", County Kerry.
Valleda	France	The barque was driven ashore near "Drumore", Wigtownshire. Her crew were rescued. She was on a voyage from Liverpool, Lancashire, United Kingdom to Tristan da Cunha.
Volunteer	United Kingdom	The steamship sank at Hebburn, County Durham.

== 8 January ==
List of shipwrecks: 8 January 1873
Ship	State	Description
Danube	(United Kingdom of Great Britain and Ireland) Guernsey	The brigantine ran aground on the Maplin Sand, in the North Sea off the coast of Essex.
Hannah	United States	The ship was driven ashore at "Udo". She was on a voyage from Charleston, South Carolina to a Danish port.
Kate Carnie	United States	The ship ran aground on "Stooklimp", in the Strait of Sunda. She was on a voyage from Fuzhou, China to Philadelphia, Pennsylvania. She was refloated and taken in to Batavia, Netherlands East Indies, where she was beached.
Semaphore	United Kingdom	The ship was sighted off Whitehaven, Cumberland whilst on a voyage from Liverpool, Lancashire to Calcutta, India. No further trace, presumed foundered with the loss of all hands.

== 9 January ==
List of shipwrecks: 9 January 1873
Ship	State	Description
Avenger	United Kingdom	The ship foundered 4 nautical miles (7.4 km) off Tobago. Her crew were rescued. She was on a voyage from Scarborough, Yorkshire to Barbados.
Bessie Searight	United Kingdom	The brig foundered off the Amherst Rocks, off the coast of China.
Laconia	United Kingdom	The steamship ran aground in the Dardanelles near Gallipoli, Ottoman Empire.
Patriot	Norway	The ship struck a sunken rock and sank off Agerø, Denmark. Her crew were rescued. She was on a voyage from Dysart, Fife, United Kingdom to Drammen.
Sif	Norway	The schooner struck a rock and sank at Gamle Hellesund. Her crew were rescued. She was on a voyage from Charlestown, Cornwall, United Kingdom to Christiania.

== 10 January ==
List of shipwrecks: 10 January 1873
Ship	State	Description
Euphemia	United Kingdom	The ship struck the Tuskar Rock. She was towed in to Kingstown, County Dublin in a waterlogged condition.
Sedan	Germany	The steamship struck a reef and sank 5 nautical miles (9.3 km) off "Reef Island". She was on a voyage from Hong Kong to Shanghai, China. Some of her passengers and crew were reported missing.
Wanderer	United Kingdom	The ship was driven ashore and wrecked on a reef off Punta San Francisquito, Mexico. She was abandoned by her crew on 13 January. She was on a voyage from Glasgow, Renfrewshire to Mayaguez, Puerto Rico.

== 12 January ==
List of shipwrecks: 12 January 1873
Ship	State	Description
American Congress	United States	The ship foundered in the Atlantic Ocean with the loss of all 27 crew.
Priam	United Kingdom	The steamship ran aground in the Suez Canal. She was on a voyage from Liverpool, Lancashire to Shanghai, China. She was refloated on 15 January.

== 13 January ==
List of shipwrecks: 13 January 1873
Ship	State	Description
Active, and Alma	United Kingdom	The sloop Active collided with the schooner Alma off Flamborough Head, Yorkshire. Both vessels sank. Active was on a voyage from Middlesbrough, Yorkshire to Ipswich, Suffolk. Her crew were rescued by the schooner Dart (United Kingdom). Alma was on a voyage from Sunderland, County Durham to Chichester, Sussex. Her crew landed at Flamborough Head.
Concha	Spain	The ship was wrecked at Tenerife, Canary Islands with the loss of a crew member.
Donna Maria	United Kingdom	The schooner was driven ashore. She was refloated and towed in to Larne, County Antrim by the steamship Alexander (United Kingdom). She was on a voyage from Liverpool, Lancashire to Coquimbo, Chile. She was later refloated and resumed her voyage.
Egyptian	United Kingdom	The steamship was damaged by fire at Liverpool.
George Steele	United States	The cargo schooner was lost in a gale, sixty miles from Baracoa. Crew saved.
Glenaln	United Kingdom	The ship departed from Lisbon, Portugal for Hull, Yorkshire. No further trace, presumed foundered with the loss of all hands.
Mary	United Kingdom	The steamship departed from Gibraltar for Falmouth, Cornwall. No further trace, presumed foundered with the loss of all hands. She may have collided with Grecian (United Kingdom), with both ships foundering with the loss of all hands.
Pascal	France	The ship departed from Newcastle upon Tyne, Northumberland, United Kingdom for Le Moule, Guadeloupe. No further trace, presumed foundered with the loss of all hands.
Varuna	United Kingdom	The ship was abandoned in the Atlantic Ocean. Her crew were rescued by Rowantree (United Kingdom), which put nine of her own crew on board with the intention of taking her in to Saint Thomas, Virgin Islands. Varuna was on a voyage from New York, United States to Liverpool.

== 14 January ==
List of shipwrecks: 14 January 1873
Ship	State	Description
Elizabeth A. Oliver	United Kingdom	The ship was wrecked in Struys Bay. Her crew were rescued. She was on a voyage from Shanghai, China to New York, United States.
Glenduror	United Kingdom	The ship was driven ashore 1 nautical mile (1.9 km) north of Seascale, Cumberland. Her crew were rescued. She was on a voyage from Manila, Spanish East Indies to Liverpool, Lancashire. She broke in two on 19 January.
Nick King	United States	The steamship foundered. All on board were rescued.
Ocean	France	The barque was driven ashore between Dover and Folkestone, Kent, United Kingdom. She was on a voyage from Dunkirk, Nord to Philipville, Algeria. She was refloated on 16 January and towed in to Dover.
Tinverelly	United Kingdom	The barque ran aground on the Newcombe Sand, in the North Sea off the coast of Suffolk. She was refloated and found to be leaky.
Zima	United Kingdom	The ship was severely damaged by fire at New Orleans, Louisiana, United States.
Unnamed	United States	The barque was driven ashore at Hartland Point, Devon, United Kingdom in a capsized condition. All hands were lost.

== 15 January ==
List of shipwrecks: 15 January 1873
Ship	State	Description
County of Lanark	United Kingdom	The ship was abandoned 4 nautical miles (7.4 km) north of Gijón, Spain. She was on a voyage from Java, Netherlands East Indies to a Dutch port.
Durham Castle	United Kingdom	The steamship departed from Holyhead, Anglesey for Malta. No further trace, presumed foundered with the loss of all 27 crew.
Ellen Rose	United Kingdom	The ship departed from Les Sables-d'Olonne, Vendée, France for Liverpool, Lancashire. No further trace, presumed foundered with the loss of all hands.
Empress of the Seas	United Kingdom	The ship was sighted in the Atlantic Ocean whilst on a voyage from Calcutta, India to the Clyde. No further trace, presumed foundered with the loss of all hands.

== 16 January ==
List of shipwrecks: 16 January 1873
Ship	State	Description
Ane Mathie	Denmark	The ship was driven ashore at Skallingen. She was on a voyage from Hull, Yorkshire, United Kingdom to Esbjerg.
Eliza	United Kingdom	The ship ran aground on the East Barrow Sand, in the North Sea off the coast of Essex.
Hoopoe	United Kingdom	The sloop collided with the steamship Mauritania (United Kingdom) and sank at Cardiff, Glamorgan. She was refloated on 20 January and taken in to Cardiff.
Knight Templar	United Kingdom	The steamship foundered in the Atlantic Ocean 100 nautical miles (190 km) west of The Lizard, Cornwall. She was on her maiden voyage, from Cardiff to Bombay, India.

== 17 January ==
List of shipwrecks: 17 January 1873
Ship	State	Description
Ariadne	United Kingdom	The ship departed from Liverpool, Lancashire for St. Ubes, Portugal. No further trace, presumed foundered with the loss of all hands.
Ems	United Kingdom	The steamship was driven ashore at Shoebury, Essex.
Franklin A.	United States	The cargo schooner was run down and sunk by schooner E. B. Phillips off Falkland Island, Long Island Sound. Crew saved.
Overton	United Kingdom	The 40-foot (12 m) trawling smack was run down and sunk while fishing by Semaphore (United Kingdom) 6 miles (9.7 km) northeast of the Morecambe Lightship. The crew climbed her anchor chain to get aboard.
Texas	United Kingdom	The steamship ran aground at Boston, Massachusetts, United States. She was on a voyage from Liverpool, Lancashire to Boston.

== 18 January ==
List of shipwrecks: 18 January 1873
Ship	State	Description
Amelia	United Kingdom	The steamship ran aground at Swansea, Glamorgan. She was on a voyage from Swansea to Huelva, Spain. She was refloated and resumed her voyage.
Culzean	United Kingdom	The ship was driven into shallow water at Dundee, Forfarshire and ran aground. She was refloated and taken in to Dundee.
Eliza	United Kingdom	The lighter sank at Helensburgh, Renfrewshire.
Fanny	Russia	The brig capsized in a squall. She was on a voyage from Hull, Yorkshire to Grimsby, Lincolnshire, United Kingdom. She was beached at Hull.
James	United Kingdom	The schooner was driven ashore and wrecked at Arbroath, Forfarshire. Her four crew were rescued by the Arbroath Lifeboat People's Journal No. 2 ( Royal National Lifeboat Institution). She was on a voyage from Newcastle upon Tyne, Northumberland to Arbroath.
Jane Edwards	United Kingdom	The ship was driven ashore at Arbroath.
Magnet	Germany	The paddle tug sank off Schiermonnikoog, Friesland, Netherlands with the loss of six of her ten crew. Survivors were rescued by Twee Gebroeders (Netherlands). Magnet was on a voyage from Geestemünde to Queenstown, County Cork, United Kingdom.
Merle	United Kingdom	The barque was driven into Deal Pier, Kent; both were severely damaged. Her crew were rescued. She was on a voyage from London to Saint Lucia and Dominica. Although declared a loss, she was extracted on 1 February and towed in to the River Thames. She was repaired and returned to service.
Nova Palmeira	Portugal	The barque was wrecked at Porto. Her crew were rescued. She was on a voyage from Pará, Brazil to Porto.
Ouizeau	United Kingdom	The ship ran aground at Liverpool, Lancashire. She was on a voyage from Calcutta, India to Liverpool.
Refondo	Norway	The ship was driven ashore and wrecked at Tønsberg.
Sentinel	United Kingdom	The steamship ran aground at Heligoland. She was refloated and taken in to the Elbe.
Zwei Gebruder	Germany	The ship was wrecked near Cuxhaven. She was on a voyage from Newcastle upon Tyne to Brake.
Unnamed	Flag unknown	The ship was wrecked on the Wittsand, in the North Sea.

== 19 January ==
List of shipwrecks: 19 January 1873
Ship	State	Description
Alarm	United Kingdom	The schooner collided with the barque Nimrod (United Kingdom) and sank in The Downs with the loss of a crew member. She was on a voyage from Sunderland, County Durham to Rye, Sussex.
Arcadia	United Kingdom	The steamship collided with the steamship Mendoza (United Kingdom) in the River Mersey and was severely damaged. She was towed in to Liverpool, Lancashire by the tug Iron King (United Kingdom) and sank at the stern. Arcadia was on a voyage from Smyrna, Ottoman Empire to Liverpool.
Captain Hathorn	United Kingdom	The brig collided with the steamship Mazeppe (United Kingdom and sank in the Bristol Channel off Penarth, Glamorgan. Her crew were rescued. Captain Hathorn was on a voyage from Swansea, Glamorgan to Workington, Cumberland.
Cariboo	France	The barque was driven against the quayside in a hurricane at Aspinwall, United States of Colombia, severely damaging the quayside.
Charles H. Kelly	United States	The schooner was driven ashore in a hurricane at Aspinwall.
Jane Morgans	United Kingdom	The schooner was driven ashore at Penmon, Anglesey. She was on a voyage from Liverpool, Lancashire to Swansea.
J. W. Halls	United Kingdom	The schooner was driven into a French steamship and damaged in a hurricane at Aspinwall.
Desirande	France	The steamship was driven into by the steamship Tasmanian (United Kingdom) and was severely damaged in a hurricane at Aspinwall.
Gilmore Meredith	United Kingdom	The barque was driven ashore and wrecked in a hurricane at Aspinwall. Two would-be rescuers were drowned when their boat capsized as they rowed out to the wreck.
Leugalglia	Italy	The barque was driven ashore and wrecked at Cardiff, Glamorgan. She was on a voyage from Dublin, United Kingdom to Genoa.
Mischief	United Kingdom	The schooner collided with Augia ( (United Kingdom of Great Britain and Ireland) Jersey) and sank in The Downs.
Orient	United States	The barque was driven against the quayside in a hurricane at Aspinwall, severely damaging the quayside. She consequently sank.
Richard	United Kingdom	The ship ran aground off Cap Arcona, Germany. She was on a voyage from Dysart, Fife to Wismar, Germany. She was refloated.
Rose	United Kingdom	The sloop was wrecked on the Kentish Knock. Her crew were rescued by a smack. She was on a voyage from Hartlepool, County Durham to Portsmouth, Hampshire and/or Ryde, Isle of Wight. She may have struck a sunken wreck.
Royal Arch	United States	The schooner was severely damaged in a hurricane at Aspinwall. She consequently sank.
Spray	United Kingdom	The steamship collided with the steamship John Fenwick (United Kingdom) and was beached at Cardiff.
Three unnamed vessels	Flags unknown	Two barques and a brig were driven ashore in a hurricane at Aspinwall.
Three unnamed vessels	United States of Colombia	The coastal schooners sank in a hurricane at Aspinwall.

== 20 January ==
List of shipwrecks: 20 January 1873
Ship	State	Description
Belle Isle	United Kingdom	The brig ran aground on the Sizewell Bank and foundered in the North Sea off Southwold, Suffolk. Her crew were rescued by the Southwold Lifeboat Quiver No. 2 ( Royal National Lifeboat Institution). Belle Isle was on a voyage from South Shields, County Durham to Southampton, Hampshire.
Bismarck	(United Kingdom of Great Britain and Ireland) Cape Colony	The steamship, a coaster, was driven ashore and wrecked 8 nautical miles (15 km) west of the mouth of the Keiskamma River. She was on a voyage from Table Bay to a port in the Colony of Natal.
Haabet	Denmark	The schooner was wrecked at Hirsholmene.
Formosa	United States	The ship ran aground. She was on a voyage from Manila, Spanish East Indies to Boston, Massachusetts. She was refloated and taken in to Batavia, Netherlands East Indies in a leaky condition.
Mary Russell	United Kingdom	The ship was driven ashore and wrecked at Dunwich, Suffolk. Her crew were rescued by rocket apparatus. She was on a voyage from Ängelholm, Sweden to London.
Nerio	(United Kingdom of Great Britain and Ireland) Jersey	The ship ran aground at St. Ives, Cornwall. She was on a voyage from Saint-Malo, Ille-et-Vilaine, France to Clonakilty, County Cork. She was refloated and found to be leaky.
Perseverance	United Kingdom	The ship was driven ashore at Thorpeness, Suffolk. Her crew were rescued.
Vrye Handel	Netherlands	The ship was lost off Frontera de Tobasco, Mexico.
Whirlwind	New Zealand	The ship ran aground at Batavia. She was on a voyage from Hong Kong to Dunedin. She was refloated and found to be leaky.
Wild Flower	United Kingdom	The ship was driven ashore and wrecked at Cap de la Chèvre, Finistère, France. Her crew were rescued. She was on a voyage from Oran, Algeria to Newcastle upon Tyne, Northumberland.

== 21 January ==
List of shipwrecks: 21 January 1873
Ship	State	Description
Chance	(United Kingdom of Great Britain and Ireland) Jersey	The ship foundered off Saint-Malo, Ille-et-Vilaine, France. Her crew were rescued.
Genero Ferrari	Italy	The barque was abandoned in the Atlantic Ocean off Ouessant, Finistère, France. Her crew were rescued by the steamship Isis (United Kingdom).
Giovanni Cabotto	Italy	The ship was abandoned off Vigo, Spain. Her crew were rescued.
John Rosser	United Kingdom	The ship was wrecked at Sestri Levante, Italy. Her crew were rescued.
Peru	United Kingdom	The collier, a full-rigged ship, collided with the barque Gertrudis (Spain) was abandoned in the Bay of Biscay south of Arcachon, Gironde France. Thirteen crew were rescued by Astrea (United Kingdom), others may have been rescued by Gertrudis. Peru was on a voyage from Cardiff, Glamorgan to Rio de Janeiro, Brazil.
Union Bayonnaise	France	The steamship was driven ashore and wrecked at Saint-Jean-de-Luz, Basses-Pyrénées. She was on a voyage from Bayonne to Antwerp, Belgium. Union Bayonnaise was refloated on 14 May and taken in to Saind-Jean-de-Luz.

== 22 January ==
List of shipwrecks: 22 January 1873
Ship	State	Description
Eliza Fox	United Kingdom	The ship was wrecked at Douarnenez, Finistère, France. Her crew were either rescued, or lost. She was on a voyage from Plymouth, Devon to A Coruña, Spain.
Flandre	United Kingdom	The brigantine was wrecked on the Breedt Bank, in the North Sea off the coast of West Flanders, Belgium. Her crew were rescued. She was on a voyage from Sunderland, County Durham to Dunkirk, Nord, France.
Julia	United Kingdom	The schooner was driven ashore at the Point of Ayre, Isle of Man. She was on a voyage from Morecambe, Lancashire to Cardiff, Glamorgan.
Mary Ann	United Kingdom	The ship ran aground on the Goodwin Sands, Kent. She was on a voyage from South Shields, County Durham to Folkestone, Kent. She was refloated with assistance.
Northfleet	United Kingdom	The full-rigged ship sank with the loss of 293 lives after being rammed while at anchor in thick fog by the steamship Murillo (Spain) three miles off Dungeness, Kent. There were 86 survivors rescued by the tug City of London, the pilot boat Princess and the lugger Mary (all (United Kingdom). Murillo failed to offer assistance and left the scene.
Reine des Anges	France	The ship was wrecked at Barbâtre, Finistère. Her crew were rescued.

== 23 January ==
List of shipwrecks: 23 January 1873
Ship	State	Description
Belle	United Kingdom	The ship foundered in the Bay of Biscay. Her crew were rescued by Winsome (United Kingdom). Belle was on a voyage from Santander, Spain to Dublin.
Bertha	Germany	The ship was beached at Thurso, Caithness, United Kingdom. Her crew were rescued.
Cebello	Spain	The brig was wrecked north of Cap Ferret, Gironde, France with the loss of a crew member. She was on a voyage from Havana, Cuba to Santander.
Fairy	United Kingdom	The schooner was driven ashore at Berwick upon Tweed, Northumberland. She was on avoyage from Goole, Yorkshire to Budle Bay. She was later refloated with assistance.
Greenwood	United Kingdom	The steamship was destroyed by an explosion at Penarth, Glamorgan.
Jane	United Kingdom	The schooner was driven ashore at the entrance to the Larne Lough. She was on a voyage from King's Lynn, Norfolk to Londonderry.
Mirfield	United Kingdom	The ship struck a sunken wreck and was damaged. She put in to Gibraltar in a leaky condition.
Peru	United Kingdom	The ship was abandoned off Arcachon, Gironde, France. She was on a voyage from Cardiff, Glamorgan to Rio de Janeiro, Brazil.
Pyrus	United Kingdom	The barque departed from the River Tyne for Ancona, Kingdom of Italy. Subsequently foundered with the loss of all hands; wreckage washed up a Wells-next-the-Sea, Norfolk in February.
Talisman	United Kingdom	The steamship foundered 48 nautical miles (89 km) northwest of The Burlings Archipelago off the coast of Portugal with the loss of twelve of the 27 people on board. Survivors were rescued by the schooner Eugenie (United Kingdom). Talisman was on a voyage from Santos, Brazil to Hamburg, Germany.

== 24 January ==
List of shipwrecks: 24 January 1873
Ship	State	Description
Amelia	France	The ship was abandoned in the Atlantic Ocean. Her crew were rescued by Bel Steuart (United Kingdom). Amelia was on a voyage from Cap-Haïtien, Haiti to Havre de Grâce, Seine-Inférieure.
Amelie	France	The barque was abandoned in the Atlantic Ocean. Her crew were rescued by Royal (United Kingdom). Amelie was on a voyage from Hayle, Cornwall, United Kingdom to La Rochelle, Charente-Inférieure.
Andreas	Greece	The barque was abandonedin the Atlantic Ocean with the loss of four of her crew. Survivors were rescued by the brig Poseidon (United Kingdom). Andreas was on a voyage from Constanţa, Ottoman Empire to Falmouth, Cornwall.
Buffalo	United Kingdom	The tug struck the quayside and sank in the East India Docks, London. She was refloated and taken in to a dry dock.
Emblem	United Kingdom	The ship was abandoned in the Baltic Sea. Her crew were rescued. She was on a voyage from Stockholm, Sweden to an English port.
Julia	(United Kingdom of Great Britain and Ireland) Guernsey	The ship ran aground on the Hook Sand, in the English Channel off the coast of Hampshire. She was refloated and resumed her voyage.
Rurik	Norway	The ship was wrecked at Naples, Italy. Her crew were rescued. She was on a voyage from Bergen to Naples.

== 25 January ==
List of shipwrecks: 25 January 1873
Ship	State	Description
Acadia	United Kingdom	The barque caught fire at sea. She was beached at Carboneras, Spain the next day.
A. De Neuter	Belgium	The ship departed from Texel, North Holland, Netherlands for Buenos Aires, Argentina. No further trace, presumed foundered with the loss of all hands.
Agapita	Spain	The schooner was wrecked at "Machichaco". Her crew were rescued.
Blanche	United Kingdom	The barque was driven ashore at Dungeness, Kent. She was on a voyage from Jamaica to London.
Buffalo	United Kingdom	The tug struck the quayside in the East India Docks, London and sank. She was refloated and taken into a dry dock.
Caroline	United Kingdom	The schooner was driven ashore and wrecked 2 nautical miles (3.7 km) south of Seascale, Cumberland. Her crew were rescued. She was on a voyage from Port Dinorwic, Caernarfonshire to Maryport, Cumberland.
Copernic	United Kingdom	The steamship was driven ashore at Dungeness. She was refloated.
Deo Gloria	Norway	The barque was wrecked on Houat, Morbihan, France. Her crew were rescued.
Duchess of Leinster	United Kingdom	The ship was wrecked on St. Mary's Isle, Kirkcudbrightshire. Her crew were rescued. She was on a voyage from Maryport to Kirkcudbright.
George S. Wright	United States	The 214.94-ton, 161.2-foot (49.1 m) steamer departed Klawock, Department of Alaska, bound for Nanaimo, British Columbia, Canada, with a crew of 21 and approximately thirteen passengers aboard and was never heard from again. Wreckage – and two bodies – from George S. Wright later washed ashore along the coast of North America from Queen Charlotte Sound in British Columbia to Prince of Wales Island in the Alexander Archipelago in Southeast Alaska.
Ida Maria de Raath	Netherlands	The barque was driven ashore at Dungeness. She was on a voyage from Rotterdam, South Holland to the Congo River. She was refloated.
Jane Gray	United Kingdom	The barque collided with another vessel and sank in the English Channel off Portland, Dorset. Her crew were rescued by Murray (South Australia). Jane Gray was on a voyage from South Shields, County Durham to Barcelona, Spain.
Julia A. Hallack	United Kingdom	The brigantine was wrecked at Vigo, Spain. Her crew were rescued. She was on a voyage from Gijón, Spain to Messina, Sicily, Italy.
Maggie	United Kingdom	The schooner was abandoned at sea. Her crew were rescued by Curriere (France). Maggie was on a voyage from Casablanca, Morocco to Falmouth, Cornwall or Queenstown, County Cork.
Pangalos Josef	Greece	The brig was wrecked in the Glénan Islands, Finistère, France. She was on a voyage from Taganrog, Russia to Falmouth, Cornwall, United Kingdom.
Paquete do Manzanilla	United Kingdom	The ship was wrecked at "Machichacho". Her crew were rescued.
Penteiro	Italy	The ship was driven ashore and wrecked at Bray, County Wicklow, United Kingdom. She was on a voyage from Barletta to Dublin, United Kingdom.
Rangoon	United Kingdom	The steamship foundered off Cape Finisterre, Spain with the loss of seven of her 35 crew. She was on a voyage from Ismailia, Egypt to the Clyde.
Sadowa	Germany	The brig was abandoned off La Rochelle, Charente-Inférieure, France with the loss of all but two of her crew. Survivors were rescued by Miguel Saenz (Spain). She was on a voyage from Hamburg to Montevideo, Uruguay.
Sarah King	United Kingdom	The brigantine collided with the steamship Bride (United Kingdom) and sank off Morte Point, Devon. Her crew were rescued.
Viscount Kingarth	United Kingdom	The schooner was driven ashore at Islandmagee, County Antrim. Her crew survived. She was on a voyage from Greenock, Renfrewshire to Donaghadee, County Down.
West Riding	United Kingdom	The steamship collided with the steamship Anlaby (United Kingdom) and sank at Hull, Yorkshire.

== 26 January ==
List of shipwrecks: 26 January 1873
Ship	State	Description
La Petite Noemie	France	The brig collided with the full-rigged ship Britannia (United Kingdom) and was abandoned in the North Sea off the coast of County Durham, United Kingdom. Her crew were rescued by Britannia. La Petite Noemie was towed in to South Shields, County Durham by the paddle tug Stephensons (United Kingdom.
Milton Lockhart	United Kingdom	The barque was driven ashore and wrecked 2 nautical miles (3.7 km) north of Hornsea, Yorkshire. Two of her seventeen crew were rescued by rocket apparatus, the rest by the Hornsea Lifeboat. She was on a voyage from South Shields, County Durham to Genoa, Italy.
Otto	Norway	The brig was fifty-eight days out from Bahia for Falmouth, Cornwall when she was wrecked in Mount's Bay. The Penzance lifeboat Richard Lewis ( Royal National Lifeboat Institution) rescued eight men, a dog and a pig at the third attempt.
Sylphide	United States	The ship was driven ashore and wrecked at Wellfleet, Massachusetts. She was on a voyage from Boston, Massachusetts to Rotterdam, South Holland, Netherlands. She was later refloated and towed back to Boston.
Warkworth	United Kingdom	The steamship ran aground at Aberdeen and was severely damaged. She was refloated and taken in to Aberdeen in a severely leaky condition.
William	United Kingdom	The barque was abandoned 11 nautical miles (20 km) south of the Eddystone Lighthouse, Cornwall. Her crew were rescued by Alliance (United Kingdom). William was on a voyage from Newcastle upon Tyne, Northumberland to Cádiz, Spain. She was discovered by the pilot cutter Ferret (United Kingdom), which took her in to Plymouth, Devon, where she was beached.
No. 4	United Kingdom	The schooner was wrecked in the River Tay. Her six crew were rescued by the Broughty Ferry Lifeboat Mary Hartley and the Buddon Ness Lifeboat Eleonora (both Royal National Lifeboat Institution). No. 4 was on a voyage from South Shields, County Durham to Dundee, Forfarshire.

== 27 January ==
List of shipwrecks: 27 January 1873
Ship	State	Description
Britannia	United Kingdom	The steamship ran ashore and was wrecked at Torry Linn, Isle of Arran. Her crew reached shore in their boats. She was on a voyage from Alexandria, Egypt to Glasgow, Renfrewshire.
Burtons	United Kingdom	The schooner ran aground off Caister-on-Sea, Norfolk. She was refloated and taken in to Great Yarmouth, Norfolk.
Horseguards	United Kingdom	The steamship ran aground. She was refloated and taken in to Bristol, Gloucestershire.
Irene	United Kingdom	The ship collided with Andover (United Kingdom) and sank off Point Lynas, Anglesey with the loss of a crew member. Irene was on a voyage from Liverpool, Lancashire to Port Talbot, Glamorgan.
Iris	United Kingdom	The schooner was run ashore at Portland, Dorset. She was on a voyage from Poole, Dorset to Teignmouth, Devon.
Mastrooms	Netherlands	The barque ran aground on the Goodwin Sands, Kent, United Kingdom. She was on a voyage from Rotterdam, South Holland to Havana, Cuba.
Obsequious	United Kingdom	The smack was driven ashore near Withernsea, Yorkshire.
Penseiro	Italy	The ship was deirvn ashore at Bray, County Wicklow, United Kingdom. She was on a voyage from Barletta to Dublin. She was refloated on 1 June and towed in to Liverpool.
Sophia and Maria	Netherlands	The ship collided with the steamship Brittany (United Kingdom) and sank off Ouessant, Finistère, France with the loss of five of her seven crew. Survivors were rescued by Brittany. Sophia Maria was on a voyage from Amsterdam, North Holland to Curaçao.
Staffordshire	United Kingdom	The abandoned ship sank in the Atlantic Ocean. She was on a voyage from Bakers Island, Massachusetts, United States to Liverpool.
Victory	United Kingdom	The schooner was driven ashore and wrecked at Kearney, County Down. She was on a voyage from Caernarfon to Paisley, Renfrewshire.
William	United Kingdom	The derelict barque was towed in to Plymouth, Devon by the pilot cutter No. 10 (United Kingdom).

== 28 January ==
List of shipwrecks: 28 January 1873
Ship	State	Description
Agenoria	United Kingdom	The ship was wrecked on the Longships, Cornwall. She was on a voyage from Marianople, Russia to Dublin.
Britannia	United Kingdom	The steamship was driven ashore and wrecked on the Isle of Arran. Her crew were rescued. She was on a voyage from Alexandria, Egypt to Glasgow, Renfrewshire.
Castilian	Spain	The ship ran aground at Porto, Portugal.
Eleanor	United Kingdom	The Thames barge was run into by the steamship T. E. Forster (United Kingdom) and sank in the River Thames at Northfleet, Kent with the loss of one of her two crew.
Ellen Martin	United Kingdom	The schooner was driven ashore near Bideford, Devon. Her crew were rescued by rocket apparatus.
James	United Kingdom	The schooner was wrecked at Drogheda, County Louth. Her crew were rescued by the Drogheda Lifeboat. She was on a voyage from London to Drogheda. She was refloated on 10 February.
Meteor	(United Kingdom of Great Britain and Ireland) Isle of Man	The ship departed from Dover, Kent for Liverpool, Lancashire. No further trace, presumed foundered with the loss of all hands.

== 29 January ==
List of shipwrecks: 29 January 1873
Ship	State	Description
Amacreo	United Kingdom	The ship was driven ashore 2 nautical miles (3.7 km) west of St. Ann's Head, Pembrokeshire. Her crew survived. She was on a voyage from Cardiff, Glamorgan to Pernambuco, Brazil.
Azores Packet	United Kingdom	The ship departed from Swansea, Glamorgan for Bilbao, Spain. No further trace, presumed foundered with the loss of all hands.
Campolican	Spain	The brig foundered 20 nautical miles (37 km) off Porto Moniz, Madeira. Her crew were rescued. She was on a voyage from Mobile, Alabama to a Spanish port.
Cora	United Kingdom	The brig was towed in to Landskrona, Sweden in a capsized condition. She was on a voyage from Sundsvall, Sweden to Newcastle upon Tyne, Northumberland.
Gazelle	United Kingdom	The ship was driven ashore in Kyleakin Sound. She was on a voyage from Dublin to Sunderland, County Durham.
George	United Kingdom	The schooner ran aground on the Newcombe Sand, in the North Sea off the coast of Suffolk. She was refloated and assisted in to Great Yarmouth, Norfolk in a leaky condition.
Harry S. Edwards	United Kingdom	The ship ran aground in the Horse Channel. She was on a voyage from Huelva, Spain to Liverpool, Lancashire. She was refloated and taken in to Liverpool.
Hope	United Kingdom	The ship departed from Maryport, Cumberland for Swansea. No further trace, presumed foundered with the loss of all hands.
Mathilde	United Kingdom	The barque sprang a leak and was abandoned in the Bristol Channel. Her crew survived.
Julia A. Hallock	United States	The brigantine foundered in the Atlantic Ocean with the loss of all but one of her crew. She was on a voyage from Gijón, Spain to Messina, Sicily, Italy.
St. Fergus	United Kingdom	The schooner struck a rock or sunken wreck and sank in Mulroy Bay. Her crew survived. She was on a voyage from Killala, County Mayo to Liverpool, Lancashire.
Thomas Irwell	United Kingdom	The ship was wrecked at Colón, United States of Colombia.
Thompson	United Kingdom	The ship departed from Maryport for Swansea. No further trace, presumed foundered with the loss of all hands.

== 30 January ==
List of shipwrecks: 30 January 1873
Ship	State	Description
Ann Jones	United Kingdom	The schooner was driven ashore at "Passage", County Waterford.
Grecian	United Kingdom	The steamship departed from Liverpool, Lancashire for Palermo, Sicily, Italy. She was sighted off the Tuskar Rock but was presumed to have subsequently foundered with the loss of all 35 crew. She may have collided with the steamship Mary (United Kingdom), both ships foundering.
Kate	United Kingdom	The schooner was driven ashore between Dunmore and Tramore, County Waterford.
Oriental	United Kingdom	The ship departed from Falmouth, Cornwall for Gibraltar. No further trace, presumed foundered with the loss of all hands.
Servannais	France	The ship departed from Glasgow, Renfrewshire, United Kingdom for Brest, Finistère. No further trace, presumed foundered with the loss of all hands.
Unione S.	Trieste	The steamship departed from Cardiff, Glamorgan, United Kingdom. No further trace, presumed foundered with the loss of all hands.
Yorkshire Lass	United Kingdom	The ship ran aground at Havre de Grâce, Seine-Inférieure, France. She was on a voyage from Hartlepool, County Durham to Pont-Audemer, Eure, France. She was refloated and resumed her voyage.

== 31 January ==
List of shipwrecks: 31 January 1873
Ship	State	Description
Ann Jones	United Kingdom	The schooner ran aground at Waterford.
Azuline	United States	The ship was wrecked with the loss of ten of her twenty crew. Survivors were rescued by the brig Glaucus (United Kingdom). Azuline was on a voyage from Pensacola, Florida to Sunderland, County Durham, United Kingdom.
Caledon	United Kingdom	The steamship departed from Cardiff, Glamorgan for Malta. No further trace, presumed foundered with the loss of all hands.
Gateshead	United Kingdom	The barque was driven ashore at the mouth of the River Tees. She was on a voyage from Middlesbrough, Yorkshire to "Melando", Peru. She was refloated and towed in to Middlesbrough for repairs.
Oneiza	United Kingdom	The ship .was sighted off Ouessant, Finistère whilst on a voyage from the River Tyne to Aden. No further trace, presumed foundered with the loss of all hands.
Rose	United Kingdom	The schooner was wrecked at Penzance, Cornwall. Her crew were rescued.
Satena	Italy	The ship was wrecked at Castillos, Uruguay with the loss of three lives. She was on a voyage from Cádiz, Spain to Montevideo, Uruguay.
Thora	Denmark	The ship was driven ashore and wrecked at Blakeney, Norfolk, United Kingdom. She was on a voyage from Landskrona, Sweden to London, United Kingdom.
Treaty	United Kingdom	The schooner was wrecked at Penzance. Her crew were rescued.

== Unknown date ==
List of shipwrecks: Unknown date in January 1873
Ship	State	Description
Acron Maid	United Kingdom	The ship collided with Union (United Kingdom) and sank off the Copeland Islands, County Down. She was on a voyage from the Clyde to Swansea, Glamorgan.
Amble	United Kingdom	The barque was abandoned at sea. Her crew were rescued by Affiance (France).
Cali Elpis	Greece	The brig was wrecked near "Segapopuli".
Castlehow	United Kingdom	The ship ran aground on the Skullmartin Rock. She was later refloated and towed in to Belfast, County Antrim for repairs.
Charles and Edward	United Kingdom	The ship was wrecked on the Caicos Reef before 8 January. She was on a voyage from Troon, Ayrshire to Cárdenas, Cuba.
Cigana	Flag unknown	The ship ran aground. She was on a voyage from Havana, Cuba to Reval, Russia. She was refloated and taken in to Copenhagen, Denmark.
Crimea	Norway	The ship was towed in to Cork, United Kingdom in a waterlogged condition by the steamship Texas (United Kingdom).
Criterion	United Kingdom	The ship ran aground. She was refloated and taken in to Cartagena, Spain, where she was condemned.
Cuba	United Kingdom	The ship was abandoned at sea. She was on a voyage from Cardiff, Glamorgan to a port in Cuba.
Dianessio	Flag unknown	The ship was driven ashore near La Môle, Var, France.
Elizabeth Brown	United Kingdom	The ship was wrecked in Algoa Bay on or before 4 January.
Emmeline	United Kingdom	The barque capsized in the Atlantic Ocean before 27 January and was abandoned by her crew., who were rescued by Centurion (United Kingdom). Emmeline was on a voyage from Valparaíso, Chile to Swansea She was discovered by Wild Deer (United Kingdom, which put some of her crew aboard. They righted her with the assistance of eighteen crew from the steamship Nile (United Kingdom).
Express	United Kingdom	The ship was abandoned in the Atlantic Ocean before 9 January. Her crew were rescued. She was on a voyage from Quebec City, Canada to London.
George	United Kingdom	The schooner foundered in St. Andrews Bay with the loss of all four crew.
G. H. Kelly	United Kingdom	The ship was driven ashore in a hurricane at Colón, United States of Colombia.
Gilmore	United Kingdom	The ship was driven ashore in a hurricane at Colón.
Harry Russell	United Kingdom	The ship was driven ashore on the Île d'Yeu, Vendée, France. She was on a voyage from Bilbao, Spain to South Shields, County Durham.
Henry Palmer	United Kingdom	The ship was driven ashore near Maryport, Cumberland. She was refloated and taken in to Maryport.
Henry Gilbert	United Kingdom	The ship was driven ashore at Garlieston, Wigtownshire. She was refloated and taken in to Belfast, County Antrim, where she arrived on 9 January for repairs.
Herald of the Morning	United Kingdom	The ship was abandoned in the Bay of Biscay. She was on a voyage from the River Tyne to Rangoon, Burma.
Ida	France	The ship was destroyed by fire in the Atlantic Ocean before 7 January. Her crew were rescued. She was on a voyage from Dunkirk to Valparaíso.
Island Queen	United Kingdom	The barque was abandoned in the Bay of Biscay. Her thirteen crew were rescued by the steamship Maindee (United Kingdom). Island Queen was on a voyage from Alexandria, Egypt to Hull, Yorkshire.
Jeune Elvina	France	The ship collided with HMS Audacious (Royal Navy) at Hull and was damaged.
Jeune Ludovic	France	The ship was driven ashore at Swansea. She was on a voyage from Dublin to Swansea.
John and Mary	United Kingdom	The ship was driven ashore in Ballycarry Bay. She was on a voyage from Silloth, Cumberland to Dalbeattie, Kirkcudbrightshire.
Joseph Bushby	United Kingdom	The ship was abandoned in the Atlantic Ocean before 3 January. She was on a voyage from Pensacola, Florida, United States to Cardiff.
Lord Muncaster	United Kingdom	The schooner departed from Newport, Monmouthshire for Waterford in early January. No further trace, presumed foundered with the loss of all hands.
Margaret Ann	United Kingdom	The ship foundered in the Irish Sea off the coast of County Down on or before 26 January.
Mary Ann and James	United Kingdom	The ship was abandoned in the Atlantic Ocean off the coast of Finistère, France before 29 January.
Mary Coles	United Kingdom	The ship was driven ashore near Maryport. She was refloated.
Minnie Breslauer	Flag unknown	The steamship was wrecked on Bermuda before 18 January. She was on a voyage from Málaga, Spain to New York, United States.
Mont Eagle	United States	The ship was wrecked off "Great Andresos". Her crew were rescued. She was on a voyage from New Orleans, Louisiana to Bremen, Germany.
Mountaineer	United Kingdom	The ship foundered in the Irish Sea. Wreckage from the ship washed up at Point of Ayre, Isle of Man.
Nelusko	United Kingdom	The steamship was driven ashore at Portavogie, County Down. She was refloated on 18 January and taken in to the Belfast Lough.
North-East	United Kingdom	The barque was wrecked at Struys Point, Cape Colony on or before 4 January. Her crew were rescued. She was on a voyage from New York to Manila, Spanish East Indies.
Ocean King	United Kingdom	The steamship collided with another vessel and was run ashore at "Pasages" before 26 January.
Ontares	France	The ship was abandoned in the South Atlantic before 11 December.
Orient	United Kingdom	The ship was wrecked in a hurricane at Colón.
Reina	Germany	The ship was driven ashore at Lemvig, Denmark. She was on a voyage from Königsberg to Papenburg.
Royal Arch	United Kingdom	The ship was wrecked in a hurricane at Colón.
Sphinx	United Kingdom	The steamship foundered with the loss of all 21 crew.
Transport	Norway	The schooner was driven ashore at Blyth, Northumberland, United Kingdom.
Tropic	United Kingdom	The steamship ran aground in the Straits of Magellan. She was refloated.
Watauga	United States	The schooner was wrecked on a reef off Barbuda. Her crew were rescued.
West Derby	United Kingdom	The ship was driven ashore in the Dry Tortugas before 8 January. She was on a voyage from Mobile to a European port.
Young Dorchester	United Kingdom	The schooner was wrecked at Porto, Portugal.
Unnamed	United Kingdom	The brig was driven ashore at False Cape, Virginia, United States.
