= List of Category A listed buildings in North Ayrshire =

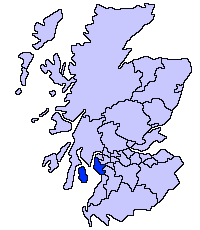
North Ayrshire shown within Scotland

This is a list of Category A listed buildings in the North Ayrshire council area in Scotland.

In Scotland, the term listed building refers to a building or other structure officially designated as being of "special architectural or historic interest". Category A structures are those considered to be "buildings of national or international importance, either architectural or historic, or fine little-altered examples of some particular period, style or building type." Listing was begun by a provision in the Town and Country Planning (Scotland) Act 1947, and the current legislative basis for listing is the Planning (Listed Buildings and Conservation Areas) (Scotland) Act 1997. The authority for listing rests with Historic Scotland, an executive agency of the Scottish Government, which inherited this role from the Scottish Development Department in 1991. Once listed, severe restrictions are imposed on the modifications allowed to a building's structure or its fittings. Listed building consent must be obtained from local authorities prior to any alteration to such a structure. There are approximately 47,400 listed buildings in Scotland, of which around 8% (some 3,800) are Category A.

The council area of North Ayrshire covers 885 square kilometres (342 sq mi), including the Isle of Arran, and has a population of around 135,200. There are 41 Category A listed buildings in the area.

== Listed buildings ==
| Name | Location | Date listed | Geo-coordinates | Notes | LB number | Image |
|---|---|---|---|---|---|---|
| Annick Lodge | Irvine | | 55°38′33″N 4°36′34″W | | 836 | Upload Photo |
| Little Cumbrae Castle | Little Cumbrae, Castle Island | | 55°43′13″N 4°56′35″W | | 853 | Upload another image See more images |
| Woodside House | Beith | | 55°45′49″N 4°38′07″W | | 943 | Upload another image See more images |
| Blair House | Dalry | | 55°41′46″N 4°41′57″W | | 1196 | Upload Photo |
| Swindridgemuir | Dalry | | 55°42′46″N 4°40′35″W | | 1254 | Upload Photo |
| Lamp near main door of Skelmorlie Parish Church | Skelmorlie | | 55°52′20″N 4°53′24″W | | 7270 | Upload another image |
| Kelburn Castle | Fairlie | | 55°46′15″N 4°50′38″W | | 7294 | Upload another image See more images |
| Kelburn Castle, monument to John, 3rd Earl of Glasgow | Fairlie | | 55°46′15″N 4°50′27″W | | 7295 | Upload another image See more images |
| Kelburn Castle, sundial to west of house | Fairlie | | 55°46′15″N 4°50′39″W | | 7298 | Upload another image See more images |
| Knock Castle | Largs | | 55°49′35″N 4°53′05″W | | 7306 | Upload another image See more images |
| Kilbirnie Auld Kirk | Kilbirnie | | 55°44′48″N 4°41′11″W | | 7492 | Upload another image See more images |
| Ladyland House Sundial | Kilbirnie | | 55°47′06″N 4°40′38″W | | 7499 | Upload another image See more images |
| Brodick Castle | Arran | | 55°35′38″N 5°09′03″W | | 7507 | Upload another image See more images |
| Brodick Castle Walled Garden | Arran | | 55°35′38″N 5°08′57″W | | 7508 | Upload another image See more images |
| Ladyland House | Kilbirnie | | 55°47′05″N 4°40′39″W | | 7532 | Upload another image See more images |
| Montgreenan | Kilwinning | | 55°39′57″N 4°38′08″W | | 7577 | Upload another image See more images |
| St. Molio's Church | Arran, Shiskine | | 55°30′49″N 5°18′43″W | | 7635 | Upload another image See more images |
| 1–27 (inclusive nos) Hamilton Terrace | Arran, Lamlash | | 55°32′02″N 5°07′41″W | | 13234 | Upload another image |
| Lamlash and Kilbride Parish Church | Arran, Lamlash | | 55°31′56″N 5°07′48″W | | 13441 | Upload another image See more images |
| Law Castle | West Kilbride | | 55°41′46″N 4°50′53″W | | 14279 | Upload another image See more images |
| Sundial, Kirktonhall | West Kilbride, Glen Road | | 55°41′41″N 4°51′26″W | | 14309 | Upload another image |
| Hunterston Castle | Hunterston | | 55°43′22″N 4°52′44″W | | 14313 | Upload another image See more images |
| St Peter-in-Chains RC Church | Ardrossan, South Crescent Road | | 55°38′27″N 4°48′33″W | | 21335 | Upload another image See more images |
| Irvine Old Parish Church and Graveyard | Irvine, Kirkgate | | 55°36′45″N 4°39′56″W | | 35409 | Upload another image See more images |
| Trinity Church | Irvine, Bridgegate | | 55°36′49″N 4°40′07″W | | 35410 | Upload another image See more images |
| Linthouse Building, Scottish Maritime Museum | Irvine, Montgomery Street | | 55°36′40″N 4°40′45″W | | 35450 | Upload another image |
| SV Carrick, Scottish Maritime Museum | Irvine, Montgomery Street | | 55°36′43″N 4°40′45″W | | 35451 | Upload Photo |
| Kilwinning Abbey | Kilwinning | | 55°39′12″N 4°41′54″W | | 36237 | Upload another image See more images |
| Clark Memorial Church | Largs, Bath Street | | 55°47′37″N 4°52′12″W | | 37152 | Upload another image See more images |
| Brooksby Convalescent Home | Largs, Greenock Road | | 55°47′52″N 4°52′04″W | | 37165 | Upload another image See more images |
| Skelmorlie Aisle | Largs | | 55°47′41″N 4°52′07″W | | 37198 | Upload another image See more images |
| Brisbane Aisle | Largs | | 55°47′41″N 4°52′08″W | | 37199 | Upload another image See more images |
| Cathedral of The Isles and Collegiate Church of the Holy Spirit | Great Cumbrae, Millport | | 55°45′20″N 4°55′28″W | | 37824 | Upload another image See more images |
| Seamill Centre, formerly Seamill House | Seamill | | 55°41′07″N 4°51′28″W | | 43209 | Upload Photo |
| Mercat Cross | Kilwinning | | 55°39′14″N 4°41′47″W | | 47598 | Upload another image See more images |
| Brodick Castle, Bavarian Summerhouse | Arran | | 55°35′34″N 5°08′56″W | | 47599 | Upload another image |

== See also ==
- Scheduled monuments in North Ayrshire
