= Lochranza distillery =

Whisky distillery in Lochranza, Scotland

Coordinates: 55°41′53″N 5°16′31″W

Lochranza Distillery
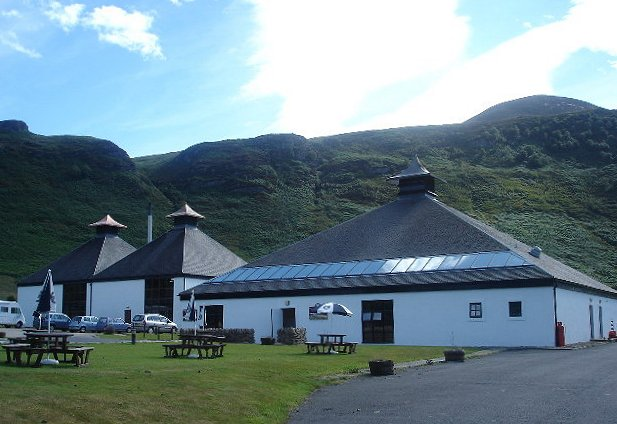
- Location: Lochranza, Scotland
- Owner: Isle of Arran Distillers Ltd
- Founded: 1995
- Status: Operational
- Water source: Loch na Davie
- No. of stills: 2 wash stills 2 spirit stills
- Capacity: 750,000 Litres/per annum

Arran
- Type: Single malt
- Age(s): 10 Years, 12 Years, 14 Years, 18 years, 21 years, 25 years
- Cask type(s): American White Oak, Ex-Bourbon Casks (Main) Ex Sherry Casks
- ABV: 46%

Lochranza Blended Scotch Whisky, Robert Burns Single Malt and Blended Whisky
- Type: Blended scotch

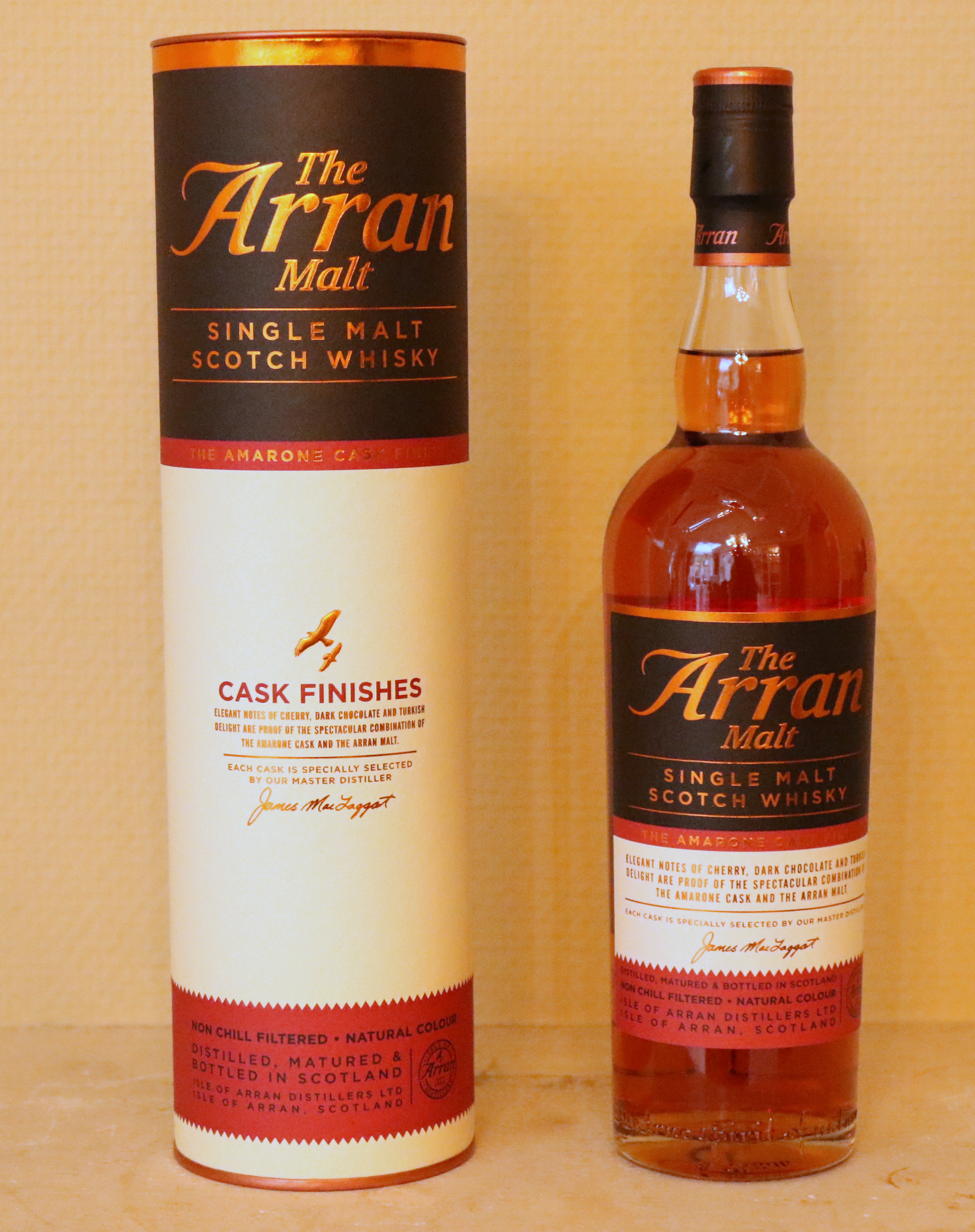
The Arran Malt Single Malt Scotch Whisky

Lochranza distillery is a whisky distillery in Lochranza, Scotland, on the Isle of Arran. It primarily releases its whisky under the Arran name.

In 1994 Arran Distillers Ltd. was founded by Harold Currie, former director of Chivas and a D-Day veteran, with the intention of building a distillery on Arran. During the construction of the distillery, a pair of golden eagles built their nest on a cliff near the distillery; since golden eagles are a protected species, construction of the distillery was temporarily halted. The distillery, funded by private investors and the sale of bonds, opened in 1995.

There used to be about fifty distilleries on the island, but most of them were "moonlight" or illegal distilleries. The most recent legally founded distillery on Arran, called ''Lagg'' closed in 1837.

Until recently a proportion of the casks were stored in the warehouses of Springbank, due to a lack of room in the distillery, and the legal impossibility of extending the current warehouses at the Arran distillery. However, the distillery now has a storage warehouse, on site, that allows easier access to barrels. The distillery offers a cask purchase scheme which offers private individuals the opportunity to own their own cask of whisky, which can be stored on site at the distillery.

The Lochranza distillery is a patron of the World Robert Burns Federation and as such has created a Robert Burns single malt and Robert Burns blended whisky in honour of Scotland's national poet. They are the only whisky distillery to be able to use the image and signature of Robert Burns on their packaging.

The whisky of Arran is mostly used to produce their single malt whisky, but a small proportion also goes into the production of their range of blended whiskies: Lochranza Blend, Robert Burns Blend and Arran Gold Single Malt Whisky Cream Liqueur.

The Arran distillery traded at a loss for many years until 2010. In 2003 Currie sold his shares and resigned from the board, the remaining shareholders own the business known as Isle of Arran Distillers Ltd., and the managing director is Euan Mitchell.

2010 saw the release of a 15th Anniversary bottling on the occasion of the distillery open day on 3 July. Autumn 2010 also saw the release of the first official 14-year-old to be released by the distillery. The first peated Arran single malt (called Machrie Moor) has been available since 8 December 2010.

The distillery celebrated its 21st anniversary in June 2016.

== Lagg ==
Plans for the company to build a second distillery in Lagg at the south end of the island were approved in August 2016 and building work began on this project in October 2016. Lagg distillery began production in April 2019 and opened its visitor center on 1 July 2019.

As the company has now opened a second distillery on the island, the distilleries are referred to as 'Lochranza' and 'Lagg'. In May 2020, a new blended whisky was announced which is made up from whisky from both of the Arran distilleries.

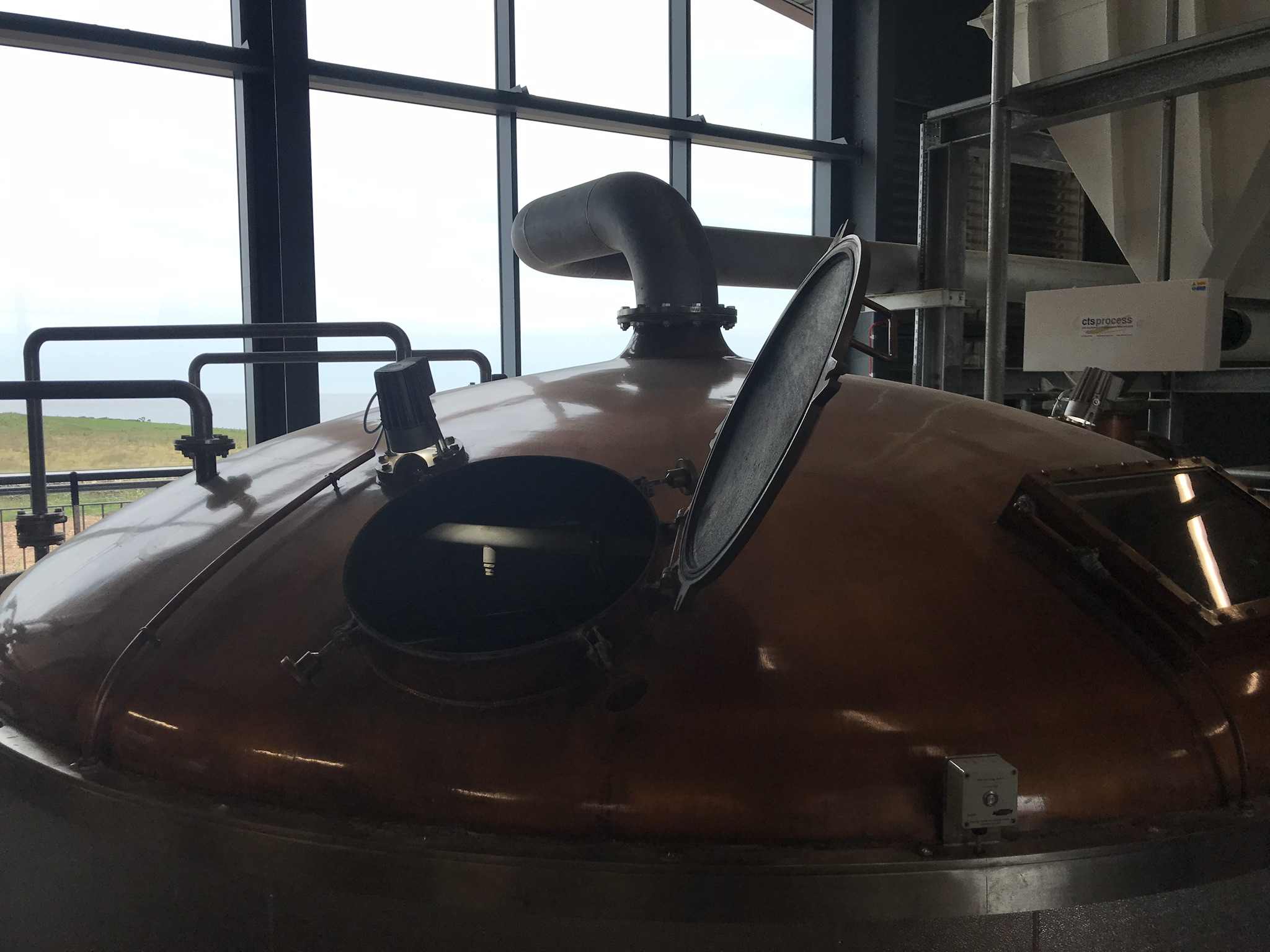
Lagg distillery

== See also ==
- Whisky
- Scotch whisky
- List of whisky brands
- List of whisky distilleries in Scotland
