= Kilmory, Arran =

Coordinates: 55.448°N 5.223°W

Kilmory: Scottish Gaelic: Cill Mhoire
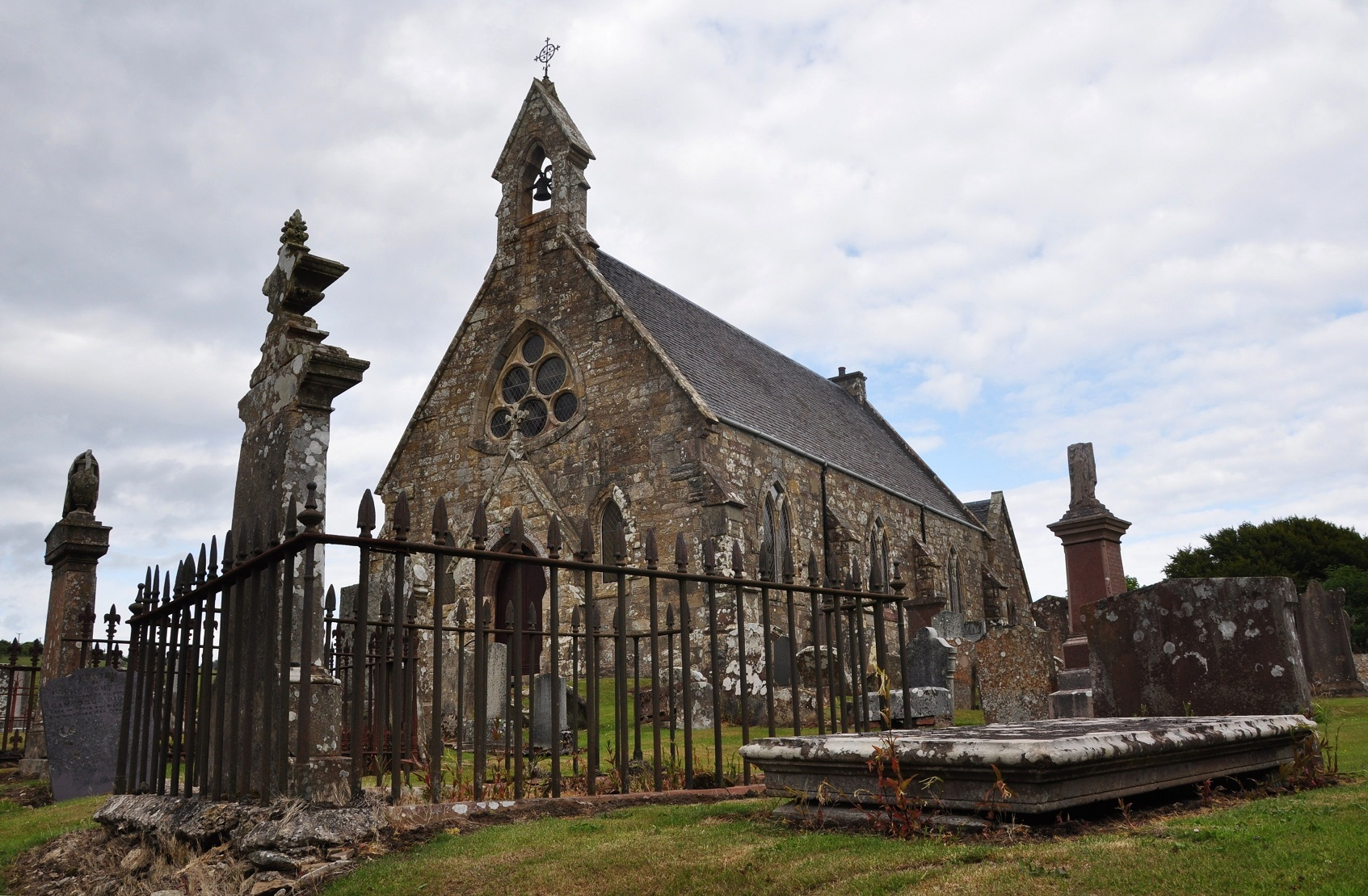
- Kilmory church

- Location within North Ayrshire
- OS grid reference: NR961218
- Civil parish: Kilmory
- Council area: North Ayrshire
- Lieutenancy area: Ayrshire and Arran
- Country: Scotland
- Sovereign state: United Kingdom
- Post town: ISLE OF ARRAN
- Postcode district: KA27
- Dialling code: 01770
- Police: Scotland
- Fire: Scottish
- Ambulance: Scottish
- UK Parliament: North Ayrshire and Arran
- Scottish Parliament: Cunninghame North

Kilmory (Scottish Gaelic: Cill Mhoire) is a small village on the south coast of the Isle of Arran, located on the coastal road between Lagg and Kildonan. Kilmory is also the parish of the western side of the Isle of Arran.

== History ==
Southwest of the village are the Kilmory Cairns (including Torrylin Cairn), a set of Neolithic chambered cairns in which skeletal remains and a flint knife were found.

== Geography ==
Kilmory is situated on the southern coast of the Isle of Arran. Visitors to Kilmory are drawn by the natural environment of the area, including a long beach.

== Community ==
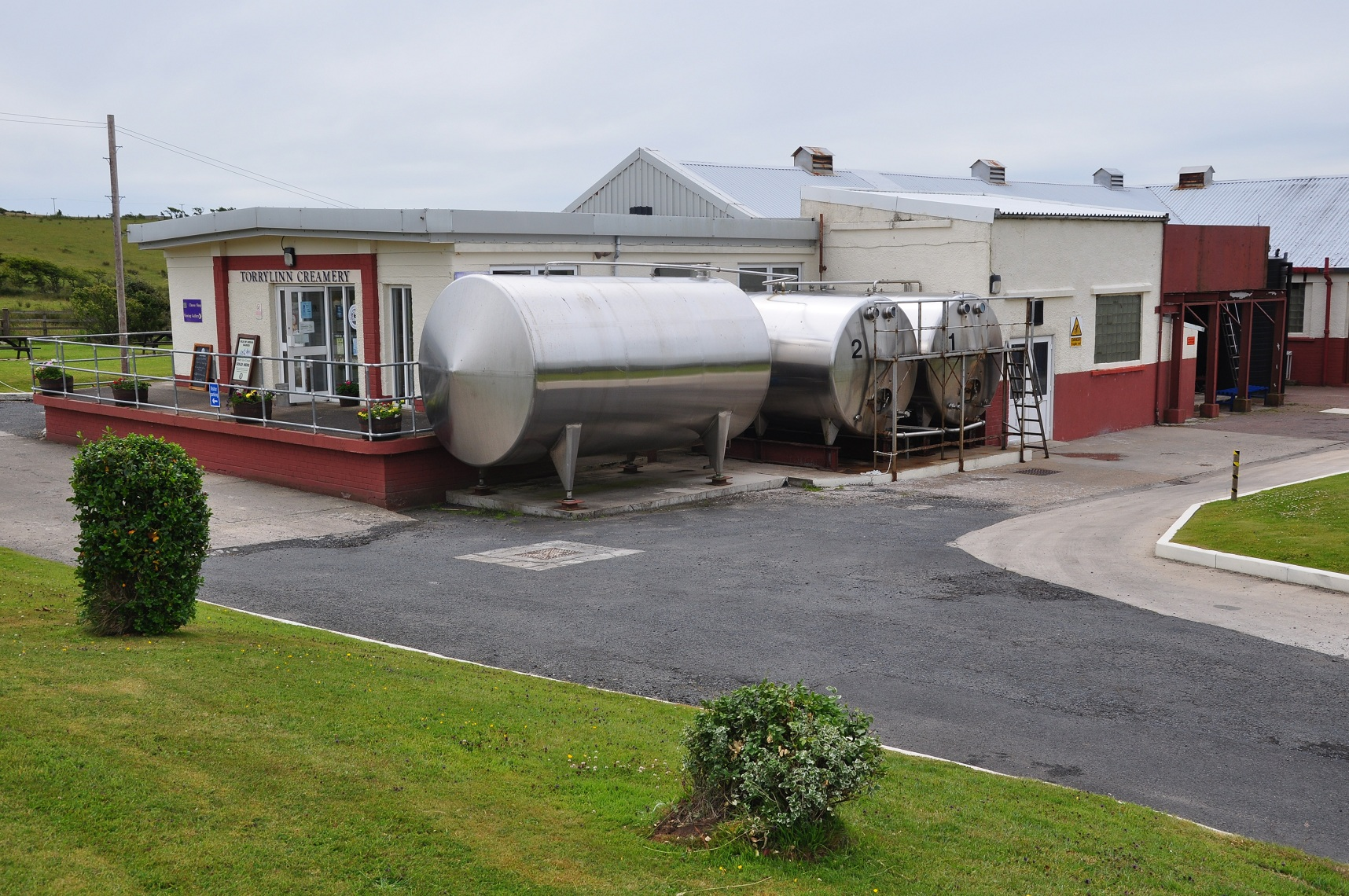
The Torrylinn Creamery at Kilmory

The village itself is no more than a few houses, a shop, a church, and a post office. In early 2007, the village suffered a loss of amenities, with the village shop, tearoom and public bar all closing. The post office was relocated to the Public Hall and opens there from 10am to 12pm on Wednesdays.

At the East end of the village was the Torrylinn creamery, which produced Arran Dunlop. The creamery was opened in 1947 by King George VI, Queen Elizabeth, Princesses Elizabeth and Margaret but closed in 2019. Cheeses produced at the creamery won a number of awards at the British Cheese Awards, including a bronze in 2018, and a silver in 2017.

As there is longer a local public bar, the village established a social club, the 1934 Club, based at the public hall. This opened in the spring of 2013. Full membership is open to residents and those who work in the district, associate membership is available to anyone sponsored by two existing members, and temporary membership is available to anyone wishing to avail themselves of the facilities.
