= Lag =

Lag, LAG, or other variations may refer to:

== Lag ==
- Łąg, Poland
- Lag (company), a French guitar maker
- Lag (cue sports), a brief pre-game competition to determine which player will go first
- Latency (engineering), a slower response time in computing, communications, and engineering
- Lag (video games), a slower response time in video gaming
- Lag screw or lag bolt
- Jet lag
- Turbo lag
- A very long putt in golf
- British slang for inmate in a prison (usually "old lag")
- The time between tasks in project plans; see Dependency (project management) § Leads and Lags
- The time before a medical diagnosis
- A measure for spatial dependence in a sampling variogram
- A delay of payment to take advantage of an expected change in exchange rates; see Leads and lags

== LAG ==
- LAG Motorcoach, a Belgian bus and trailer manufacturer
- La Grange Road station (Amtrak station code: LAG)
- Lancaster Gate tube station (London Underground station code: LAG)
- Latin America Solidarity Organisation in Norway (Latin-Amerika gruppene i Norge)
- Ligue d'Athlétisme de la Guyane, the governing body for the sport of athletics in French Guiana
- Lines of arrested growth, also known as Harris lines
- Link aggregation group, multiple computer network cables/ports used in parallel
- Local action group, a community-based organization used by groups like LEADER programme and OneVirginia2021
- Lokalbahn AG, a former German private railway company

== LAGS ==
- Lindisfarne Anglican Grammar School
- Linguistic Atlas of the Gulf States
- LA Game Space

== See also ==
- Lagg (disambiguation)
- Lagging (disambiguation)
