= David Lees =

David Lees FRSE FRCPE FRCSE DSO (1881–1934) was a Scottish expert in public health and author of the authoritative work Diagnosis and Treatment of Venereal Disease.

== Life ==
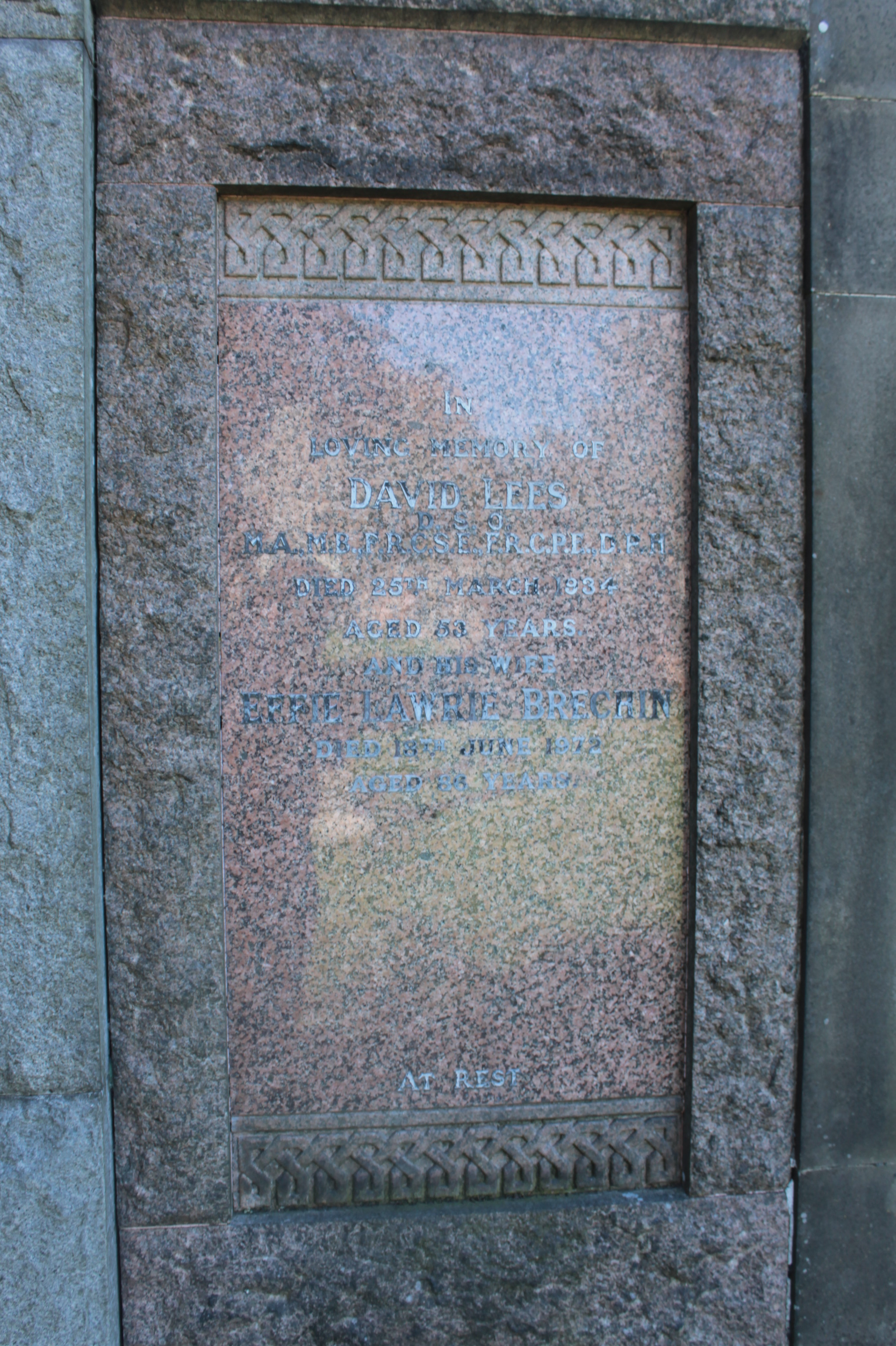
The grave of David Lees, Grange Cemetery

He was born in 1881, the son of Agnes Drennan and her husband, Robert Lees a vet from Lagg in Ayrshire. He is thought to have been a cousin to Alexander Murray Drennan. He was educated at Ayr Academy. He studied medicine at the University of Edinburgh, graduating with an MB ChB around 1902. He then undertook a Diploma in Public Health at postgraduate level. On completion he began lecturing in venereal disease at the University. He also advised on venereal disease at the Edinburgh Royal Infirmary.

He lived at 35 Ferry Road in Leith, the harbour area of Edinburgh.

In the First World War he served as Regimental Medical Officer first to the Welsh Guards then to the Irish Guards. He served in France and saw action both at Ypres and Passchendaele. He received the Distinguished Service Order for his actions. He was also mentioned in dispatches.

After the war he joined Edinburgh Corporation as Clinical Medical Officer and ran various clinics relating to sexually transmitted diseases in the Old Town. In 1933 he was elected a Fellow of the Royal Society of Edinburgh. His proposers were Arthur Logan Turner, James Hartley Ashworth, Francis Albert Eley Crew and Richard Stanfield. He was also elected a member of the Harveian Society of Edinburgh.

He died on 25 March 1934. He is buried in Grange Cemetery in south Edinburgh. The grave lies on the far west wall of the south-west extension.

== Family ==
He was married to Effie Lawrie Brechin. He was the uncle of Robert Lees (1903-1980), with whom he wrote the textbook Diagnosis and Treatment of Venereal Disease.

== Publications ==
- Vaccine Therapy in Gonorrhoea (1920)
- Keratoderma (1922)
- Intolerance to Arsenobenzol and its Derivatives (1923)
- Gonorrhoea Treatment (1924)
- Diagnosis and Treatment of Venereal Disease (1927 and multiple reprints).
