= Lagging =

Lagging may refer to:

- Pipe insulation
- Wood lagging
- Lagging (epidemiology)
- Lagging indicator (economics)
- Lagging

== See also ==
- Lag (disambiguation)
