= Scottish Maritime Museum =

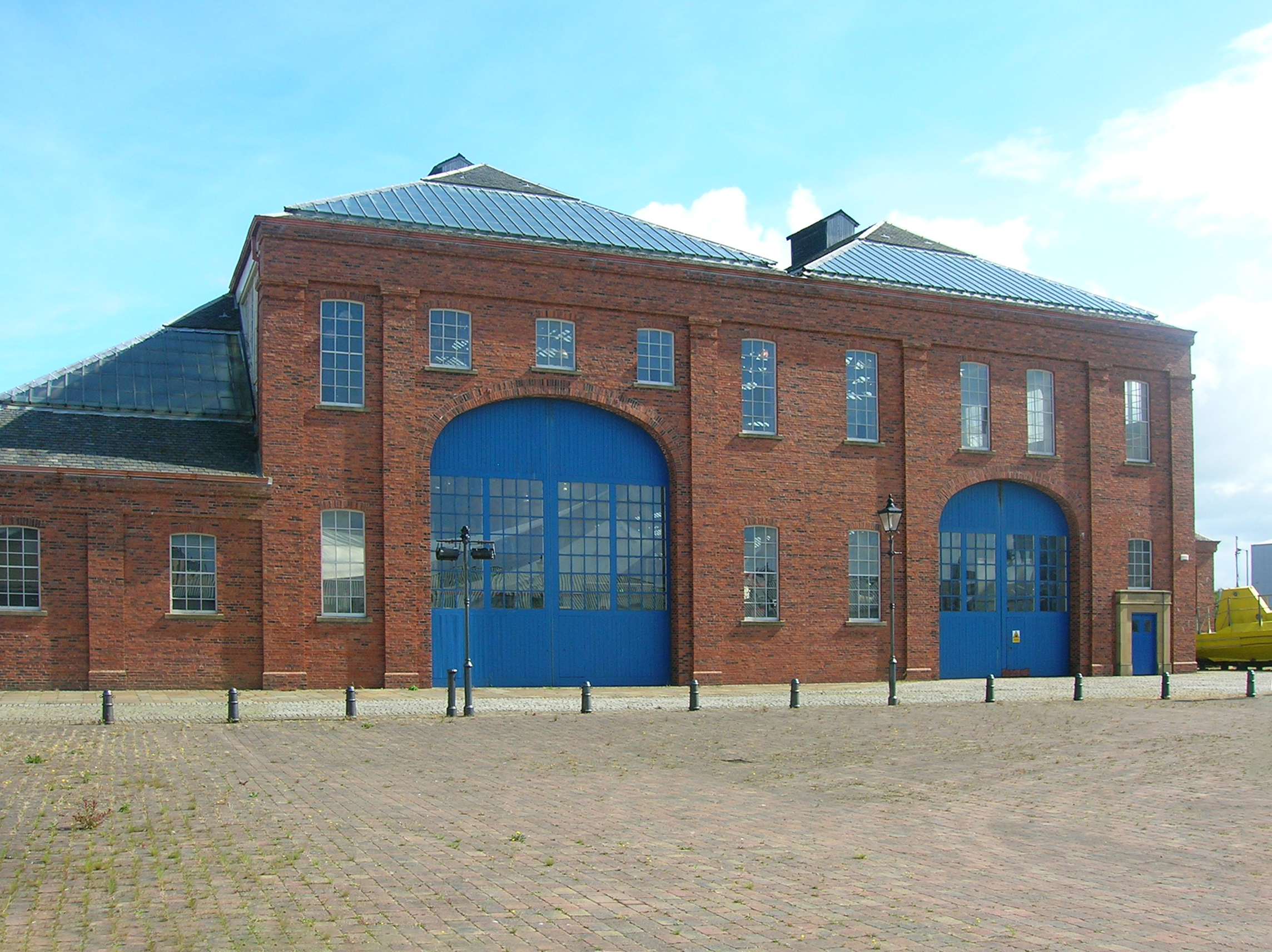
- The Linthouse building
- Established: 1991
- Location: The Linthouse, Harbour Road, Irvine, Ayrshire KA12 8BT; Scotland
- Coordinates: 55.60953°N 4.67684°W
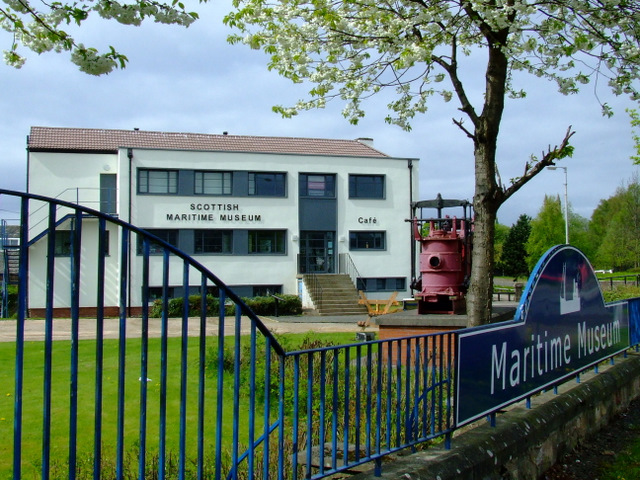
- The Dumbarton building
- Established: 1983
- Location: Denny Ship Model Experiment Tank, Castle Street, Dumbarton, Dunbartonshire G82 1QS; Scotland
- Coordinates: 55.94342°N 4.56312°W
- Type: Maritime museum
- Collection size: Buildings, ship testing tank, historic vessels, artefacts, art, personal items, shipbuilding tools and machinery
- Director: Matthew Bellhouse Moran
- Curator: James McLean
- Website: www.scottishmaritimemuseum.org

The Scottish Maritime Museum is an industrial museum with a Collection Recognised as Nationally Significant to Scotland. It is located at two sites in the West of Scotland in Irvine and Dumbarton, with a focus on Scotland's shipbuilding heritage.

== Irvine - The Linthouse ==
The museum's Linthouse building is located at Irvine Harbour, situated within the category A listed former Engine Shop of Alexander Stephen and Sons, which was salvaged and relocated from their derelict Linthouse shipyard in Glasgow in 1991. The Linthouse engineering shop is now home to a collection of significant vessels including MV Kyles and MV Spartan which are listed on the National Historic Ships UK register. A highly significant vessel built of iron in 1872 in Paisley, MV Kyles is the oldest iron Clyde built vessel still afloat in the UK. It entered the museum's collection in 1984. The museum also has a collection of marine engines and industrial machine tools, and owns a recreated 1920s worker's tenement flat at Irvine Harbour. The museum also has a significant collection of artwork funded by the Heritage Lottery Fund. In 2020 the museum managed to raise funds to keep MV Kyles as a floating vessel.

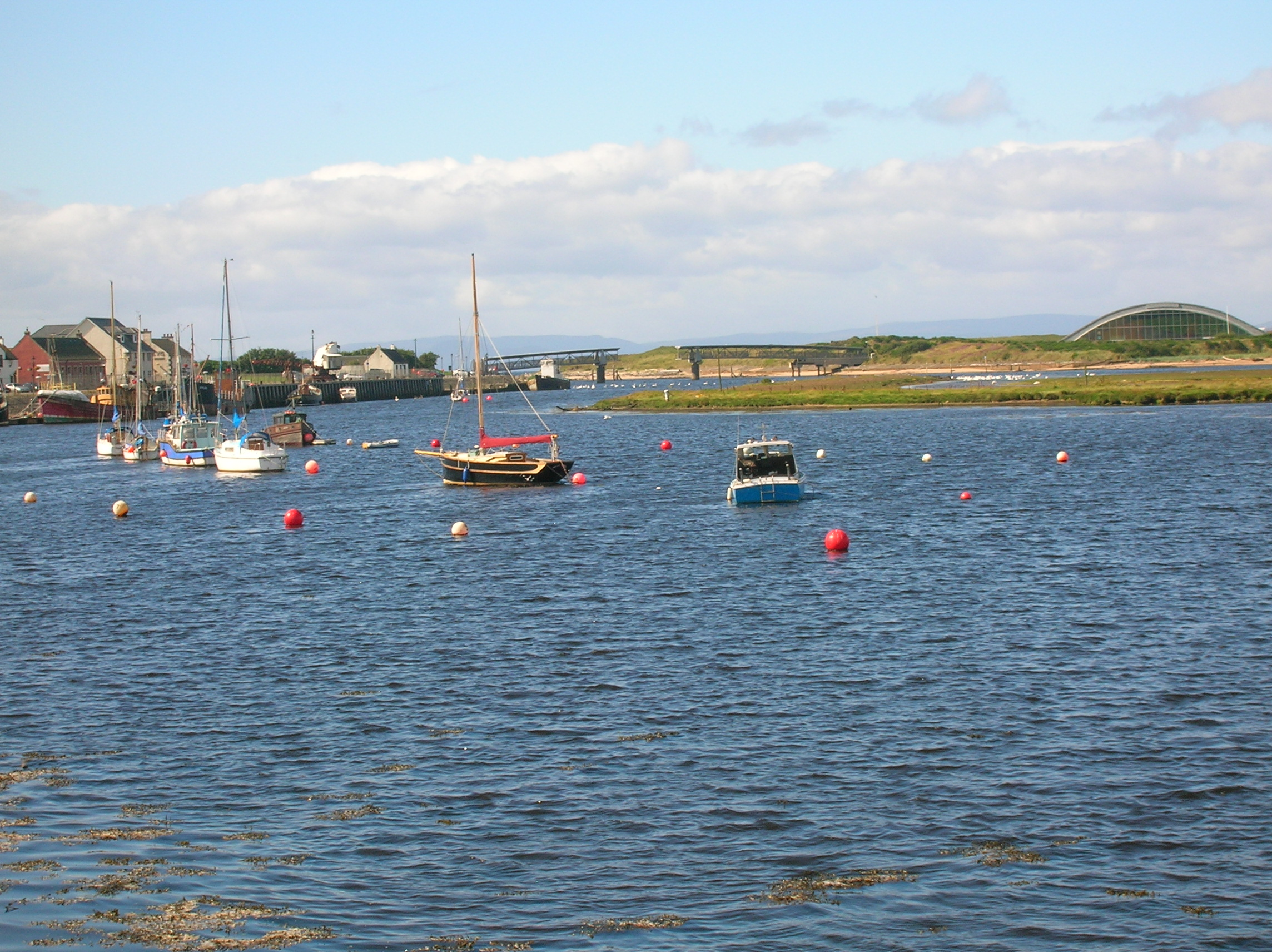
Looking seaward towards the museum's pontoons, with the closed 'Big Idea' building and footbridge in the background

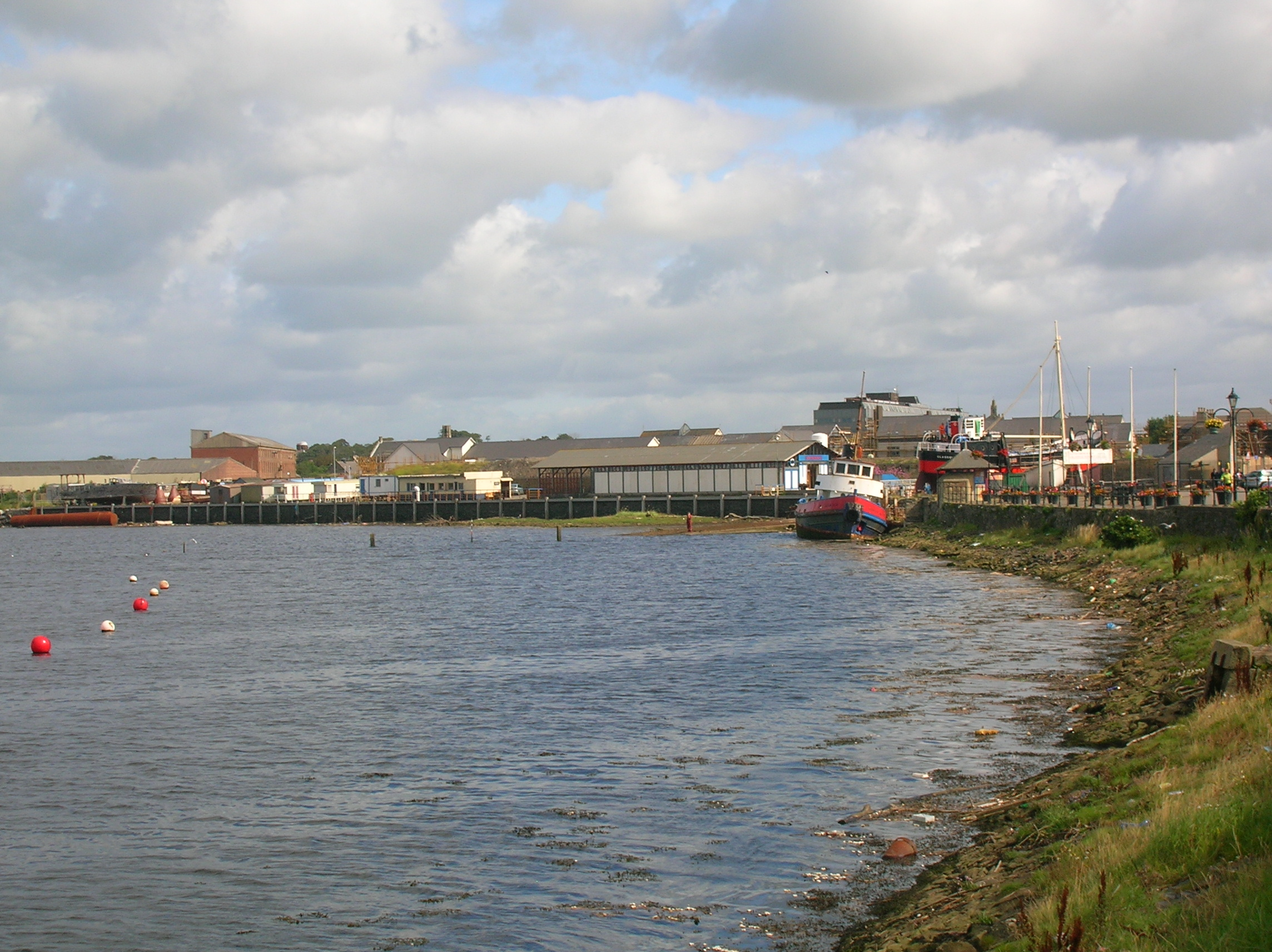
The Scottish Maritime Museum with the old ICI Explosives tug MV Garnock to the right

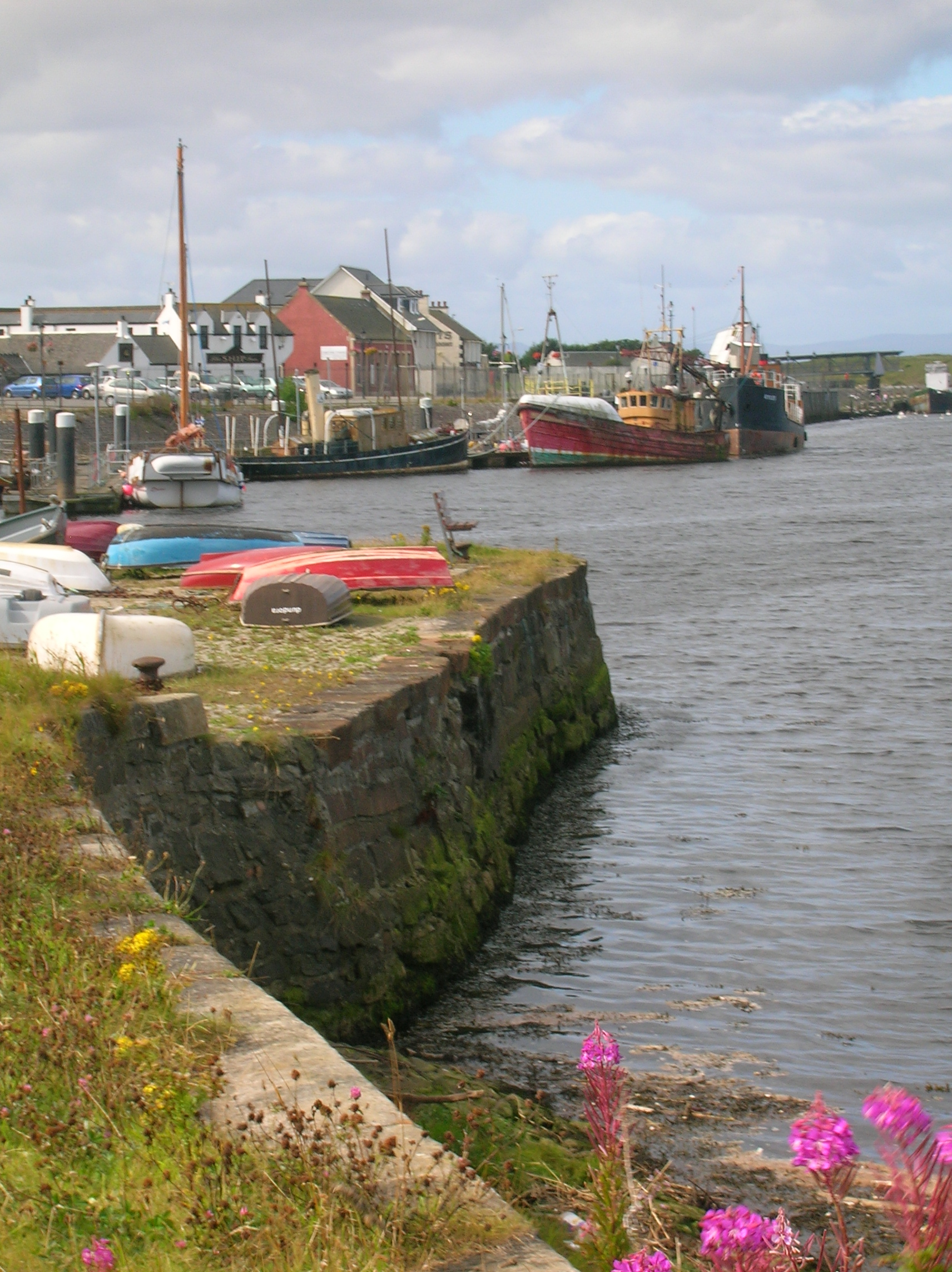
The ship exhibits at the pontoons

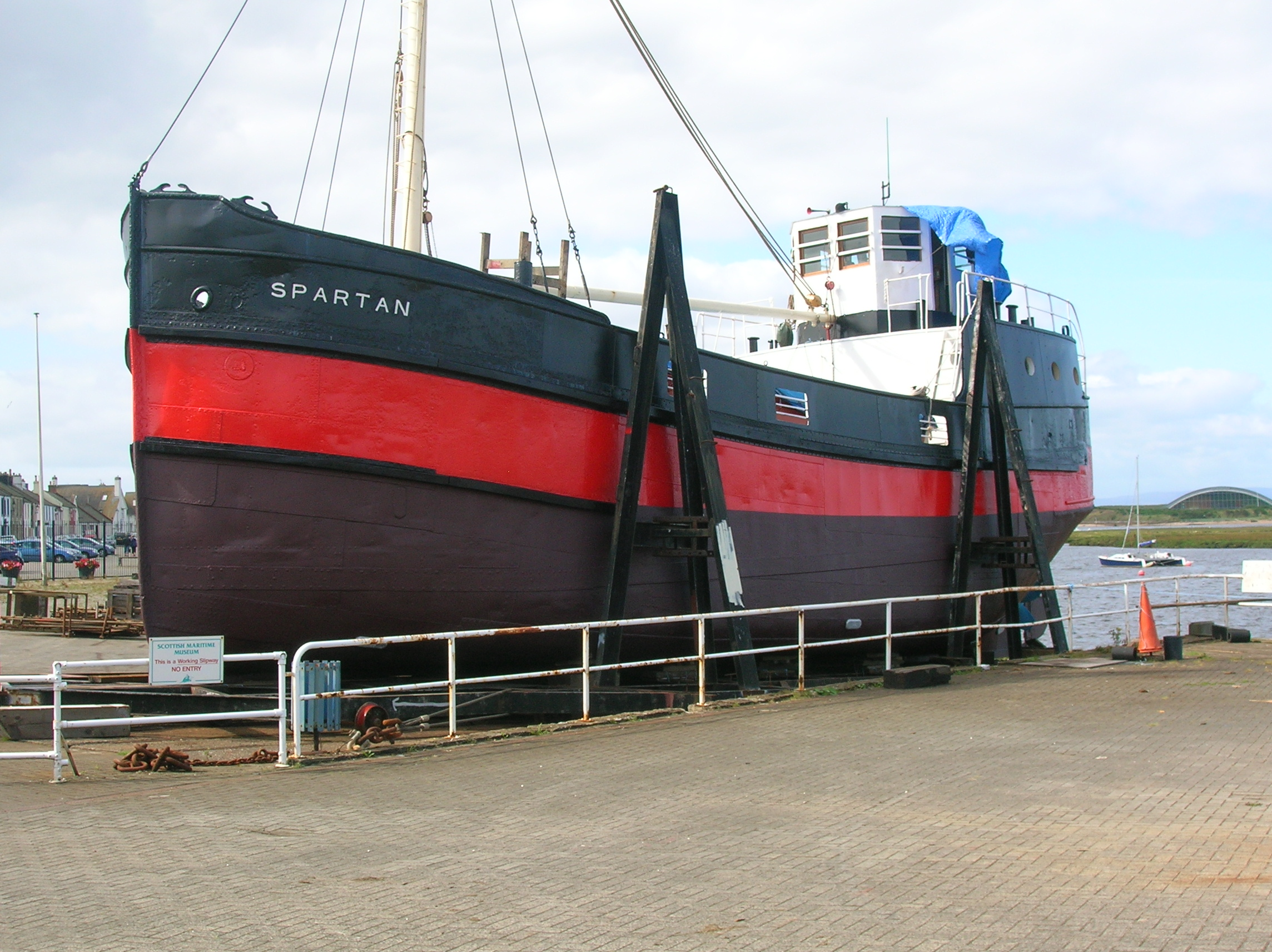
The Clyde Puffer MV Spartan at the slipway

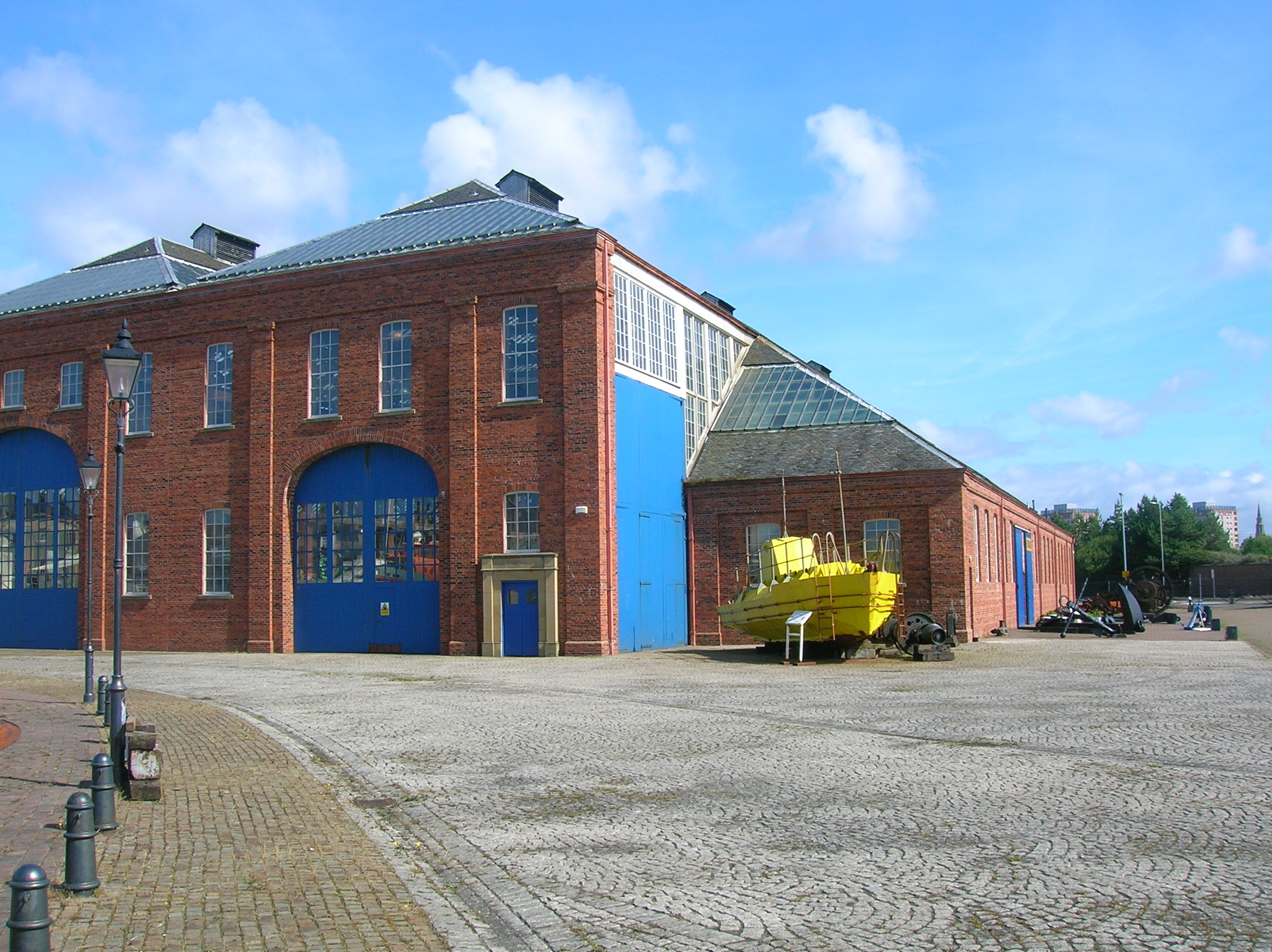
The A-listed Linthouse building forms the main exhibition hall at the Irvine Museum

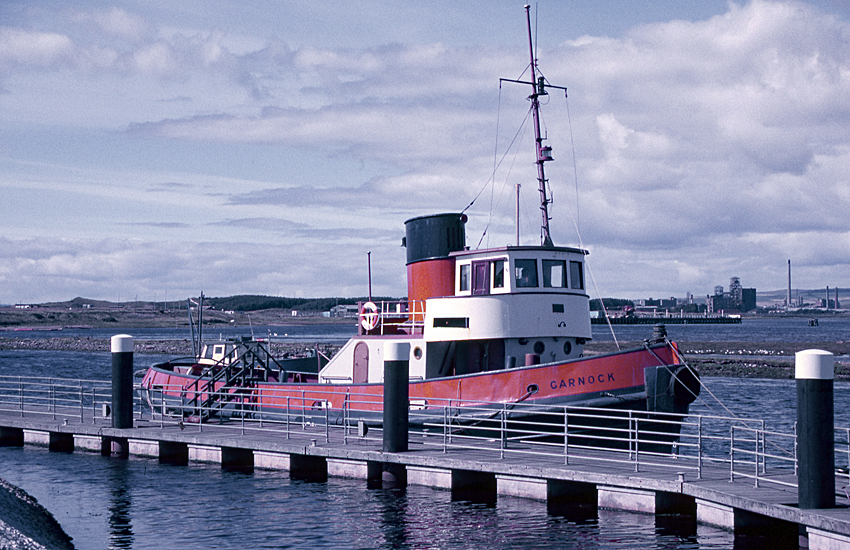
Tug Garnock

== Dumbarton - Denny Ship Model Experiment Tank ==
The Denny Ship Model Experiment Tank, in Dumbarton, focuses on the world of the naval architect. Shipbuilder William Denny Jr of William Denny and Brothers was inspired by the work of eminent naval architect William Froude and completed the tank for his shipyard in 1883. It was the world's first commercial example of a ship testing tank. Re-opened as a museum in 1983, it retains many of its original features, including the original 100-meter-long tank. The museum also tells the story of the test tank's original owners, William Denny and Brothers of Dumbarton, one of the most innovative shipbuilding companies in the world until their closure in 1963.

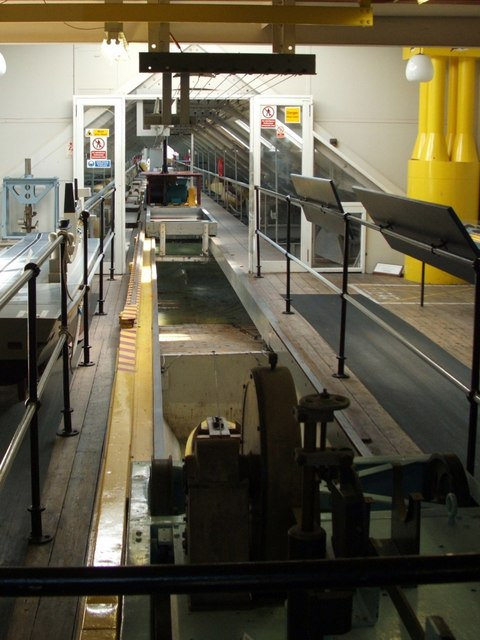
The A-listed 100m Denny Ship Model Experiment Tank forms the centrepiece of the Dumbarton collection

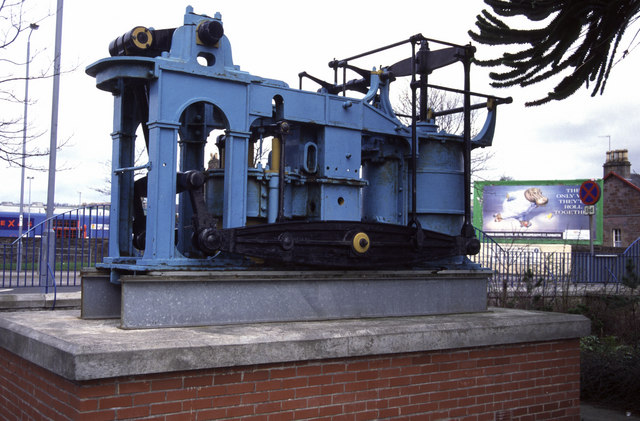
Early side-lever engine designed by Robert Napier, from PS Leven (1823), on display at Dumbarton

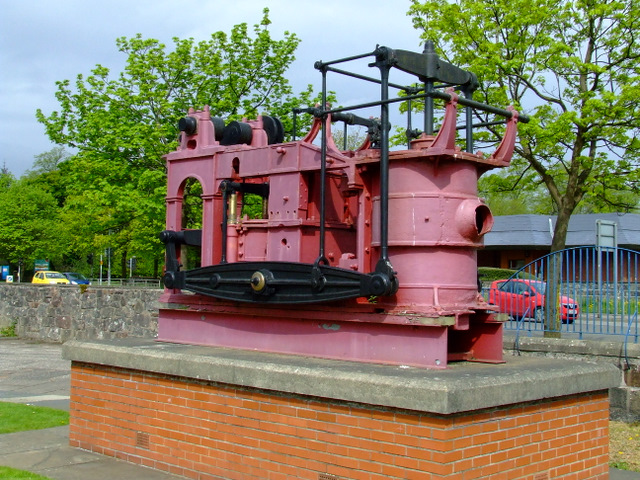
Another marine engine at Dumbarton

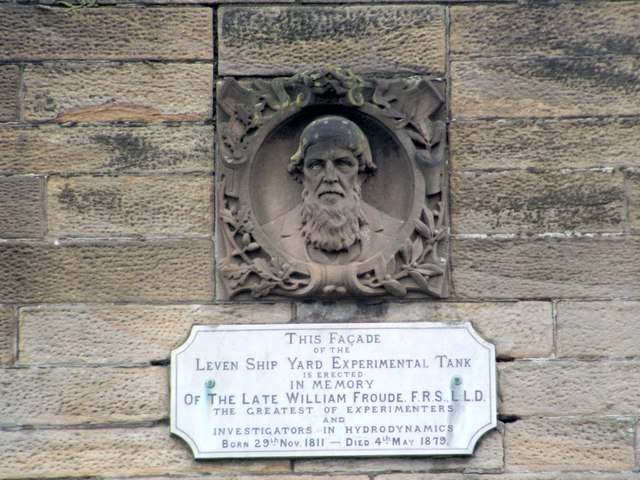
William Froude memorial on facade of building

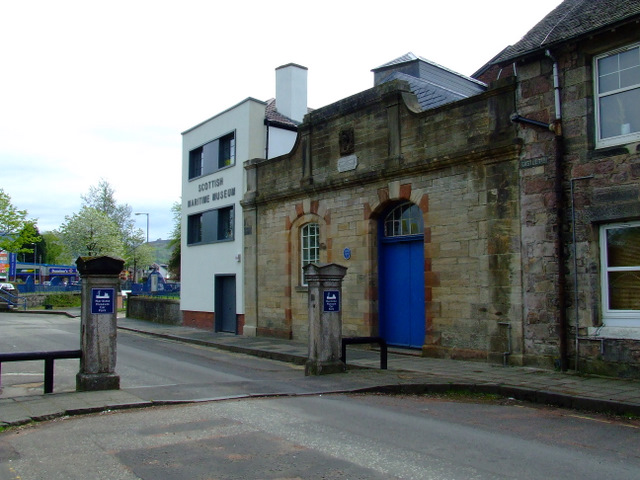
The Dumbarton building from the side

== Trust structure ==
The museum is an independent museum operated by a charitable trust: the Scottish Maritime Museum Trust. It became operational in 1983. The first trust chairperson was Clydeside shipbuilder Ross Belch who held the post until 1998 The trust includes Scottish industrial historian John R. Hume among its trustees. The founding Director was Dr Henry C. McMurray.

== See also ==
- Titan Clydebank
- Summerlee, Museum of Scottish Industrial Life
- Riverside Museum
- Aberdeen Maritime Museum
- City of Adelaide (1864)
- Boyd's Automatic tide signalling apparatus
- William Denny and Brothers
- Irvine Harbour
