= Carn Ban, Arran =

Neolithic chambered tomb in Scotland

Carn Ban
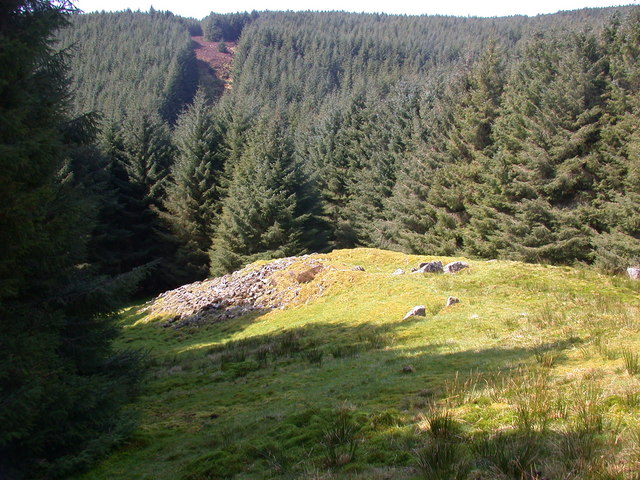
- Carn Ban, viewed from the southeast
- Interactive map of Carn Ban
- 55.488061°N 5.181281°W
- Type: Chambered burial tomb
- Periods: Neolithic
- Location: Isle of Arran

Site notes
- Owner: Historic Environment Scotland
- Public access: Yes

Scheduled monument
- Official name: Carn Ban chambered cairn
- Type: Prehistoric ritual and funerary: chambered cairn
- Designated: 28 June 1994
- Reference no.: SM90051

Carn Ban is a Neolithic chambered tomb located on the Isle of Arran in Scotland (grid reference NR99102618).

== Description ==
Carn Ban is situated in the southern part of Arran, and a walk of 4 miles (6 kilometres) is required to reach the site. It is on a steep south-west facing slope in a forest clearing partly covered in grass.

It is considered as one of the most famous of the Neolithic long cairns of south-west Scotland. It is of a type found across south-west Scotland known as a Clyde cairn. It is trapezoidal in shape, with a semicircular forecourt at the upper northeast end. The forecourt has an entrance leading into a long chamber divided into compartments by cross-slabs, similar to the arrangement at Torrylin Cairn, about 3 mi (5 km) to the southwest. The chamber of Carn Ban is 30 metres long and 18 metres broad. The tomb was excavated in the late 19th century, but the only finds were a flint flake, an unburnt fragment of human bone, and a pitchstone flake. The site has been designated a scheduled monument by Historic Environment Scotland.
