= Lagg distillery =

Whisky distillery in Scotland

Coordinates: 55.4456°N 5.2482°W

Lagg Distillery
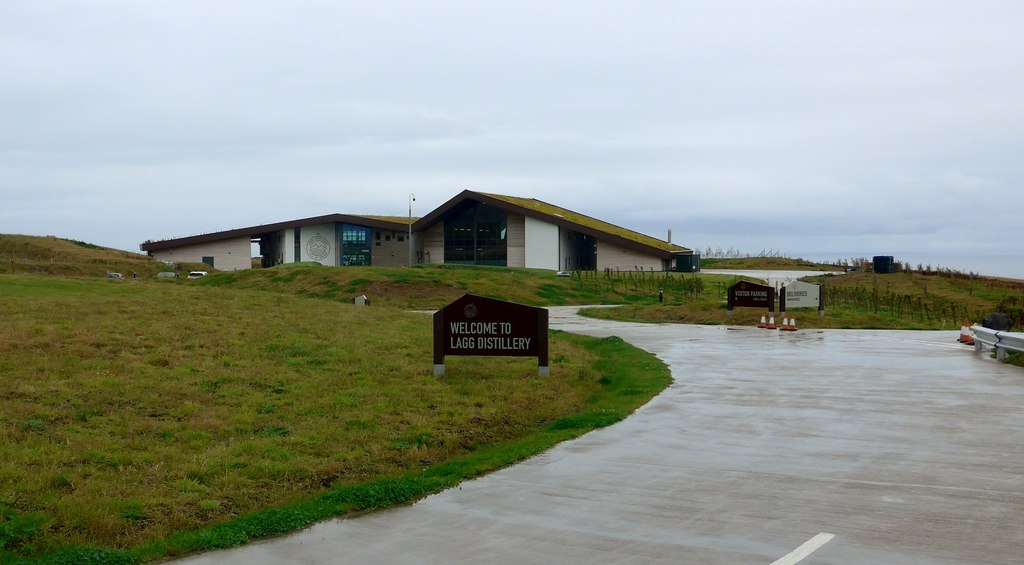
- Location: Lagg, Arran, Scotland
- Owner: Isle of Arran Distillers Ltd.
- Founded: 2019
- Status: Active
- No. of stills: 1 wash still 1 spirit still
- Capacity: Approx. 500,000 LPA
- Website: laggwhisky.com

Lagg distillery is a single malt Scotch whisky distillery located near the village of Lagg, Arran on the southern coast of the Isle of Arran, Scotland. Owned by Isle of Arran Distillers Ltd. the distillery opened in 2019 and is known for producing heavily peated whiskies.

== History ==
The original Lagg distillery operated briefly in the early 19th century before closing in 1837. The area was historically known for illicit distilling due to its remote geography and limited excise enforcement.

In 2016, the owners of Arran based Lochranza distillery, Isle of Arran Distillers Ltd. announced plans for a second distillery on the island to produce peated whisky. The facility, designed by Denham Benn Architects, includes a green roof and panoramic visitor centre.

Construction was completed in early 2019, and the first spirit run occurred that spring. The distillery officially opened to the public in June 2019.

In 2022, Lagg distillery released its first single malt.

In 2024, Lagg partnered with Dougarie Estate, Caledonian Climate, and Angus Estate Plant to restore 325 hectares of damaged peatland on Arran. The project, funded by Peatland ACTION, is expected to sequester over 16,500 tCO₂e over 55 years.

In June 2024, Lagg's core range debuted in the U.S. through Hotaling & Co.

== Production ==
Lagg uses heavily peated malted barley (~50 ppm phenols) and operates with two copper pot stills.

== Inaugural releases ==
The first single malts were released in 2022:

- Kilmory Edition: ex-bourbon cask, non-chill filtered, 46% ABV.
- Corriecravie Edition: finished in Oloroso sherry casks, 55% ABV.

== Visitor experience ==
Lagg distillery have an visitor centre with tasting rooms, a café-bar, and scenic views across the Firth of Clyde.

== See also ==
- Scotch whisky
- List of whisky brands
