= Clark Memorial Church =

Historic church in Scotland

Coordinates: 55°47′37″N 4°52′12″W

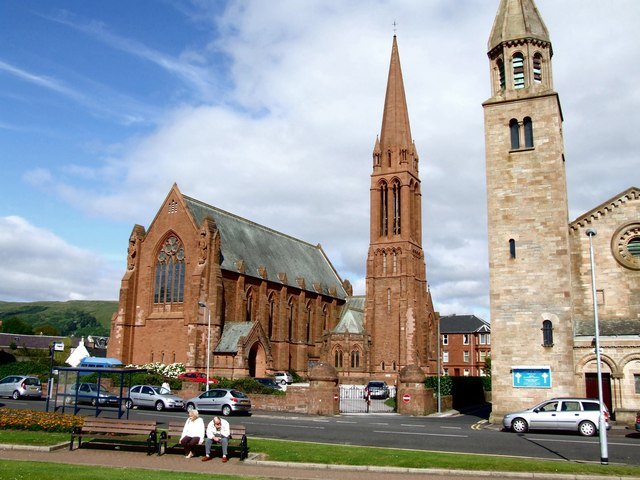
Clark Memorial Church, viewed from Bath Street.

The Clark Memorial Church is an active place of worship for the Church of Scotland in Largs, North Ayrshire, Scotland. It was designed by William Kerr in 1890–1892, and is a category A listed building, having been listed in 1971.
