= Torrylin Cairn =

Archaeological site in North Ayrshire, Scotland

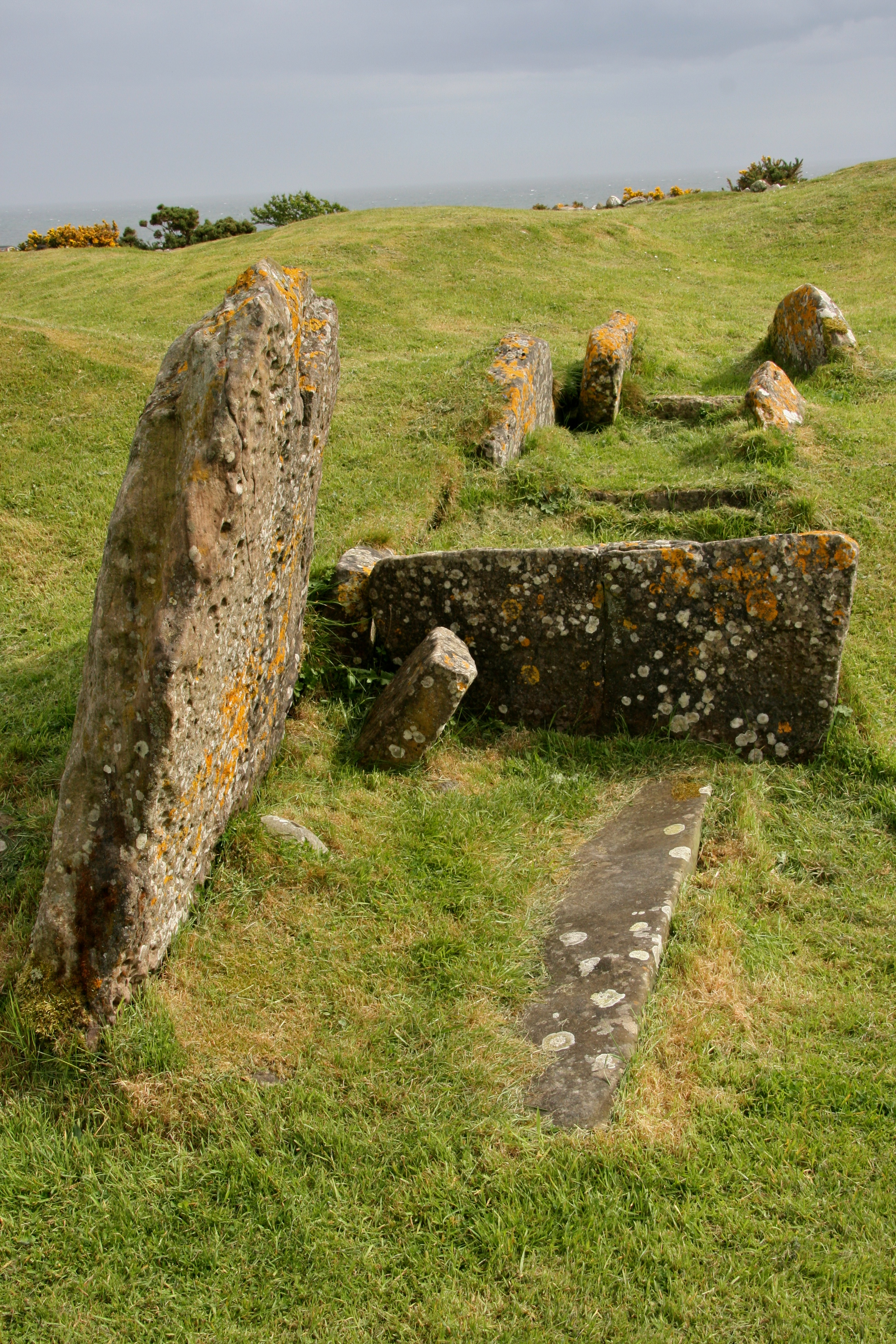
- Torrylin Cairn

- Shown on Arran
- 55°26′27″N 5°14′02″W
- Type: Chambered burial tomb
- Periods: Neolithic
- Location: Isle of Arran

Site notes
- Owner: Historic Scotland
- Public access: Yes

Torrylin Cairn is the remains of a Neolithic chambered tomb. It is located near Kilmory on the Isle of Arran in Scotland (grid reference NR95532108).

== Description ==
Torrylin Cairn is situated beside Kilmory Water just south of the hamlet of Lagg.

The cairn has been interfered with by stone robbing and later dumping of field stones and its original shape and size are uncertain. The chamber is 6.7 metres (22 feet 0 inches) long by about 1.2 m (3 ft 11 in) wide with each compartment about 1.4 m (4 ft 7 in) long. Torrylin Cairn is of a type found across south-west Scotland known as a Clyde cairn, of which a better preserved example can be found at Carn Ban, about three miles (five kilometres) to the northeast. The tomb would probably have had a crescent-shaped forecourt, framed by a façade of slender upright stones.

Antiquarian excavations in the 19th century uncovered an elongated burial chamber, divided into four compartments. Only the innermost compartment was intact. It contained the remains of six adults, a child and an infant. Beside them lay a flint tool and a fragment of pottery.
