= Lagg, Arran =

Coordinates: 55.445°N 5.234°W

Lagg: Scottish Gaelic: An Lag
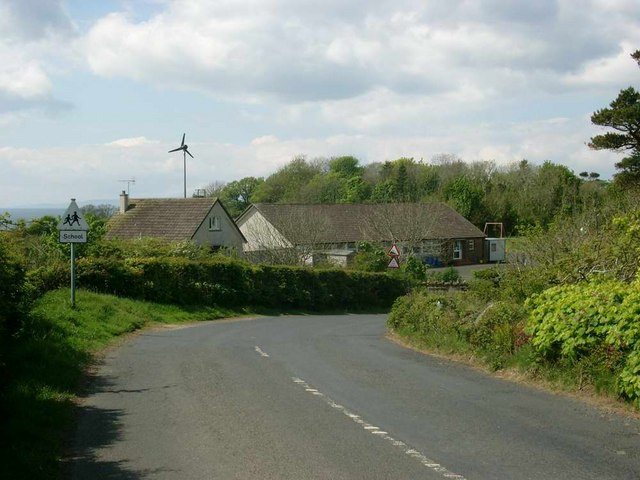
- Entering Lagg from Kilmory

- Location within North Ayrshire
- OS grid reference: NR954215
- Civil parish: Kilmory
- Council area: North Ayrshire
- Lieutenancy area: Ayrshire and Arran
- Country: Scotland
- Sovereign state: United Kingdom
- Post town: ISLE OF ARRAN
- Postcode district: KA27
- Dialling code: 01770
- Police: Scotland
- Fire: Scottish
- Ambulance: Scottish
- UK Parliament: North Ayrshire and Arran
- Scottish Parliament: Cunninghame North

Lagg (Scottish Gaelic: An Lag) is a hamlet on southern coast of the Isle of Arran in Scotland made up of a few houses and a hotel. The hamlet is within the parish of Kilmory.

== History ==
The name "Lagg" means "The hollow". The family-run hotel has a restaurant and bar and is the oldest inn on Arran, dating back to 1791. The old public bar has been refurbished into a cycling-based cafe, serving cakes and light lunches. Red squirrels are abundant and can be seen roaming around the hotel's garden.

There are various cairns near Lagg on either side of the local river, reached by a forest footpath, named 'lover's lane' near the bridge that follows the riverbank south towards the sea. The sandy beaches here are some of the best in Scotland.

The village of Lagg, along with other areas of the Isle, has a long history of illicit whisky distilling. The first legal distillery on the south of the isle opened in 2019 with Lagg distillery, producing a classic island style of whisky.

== People from Lagg ==
- David Lees FRSE (1881–1934), public health expert
