= James George Semple Lisle =

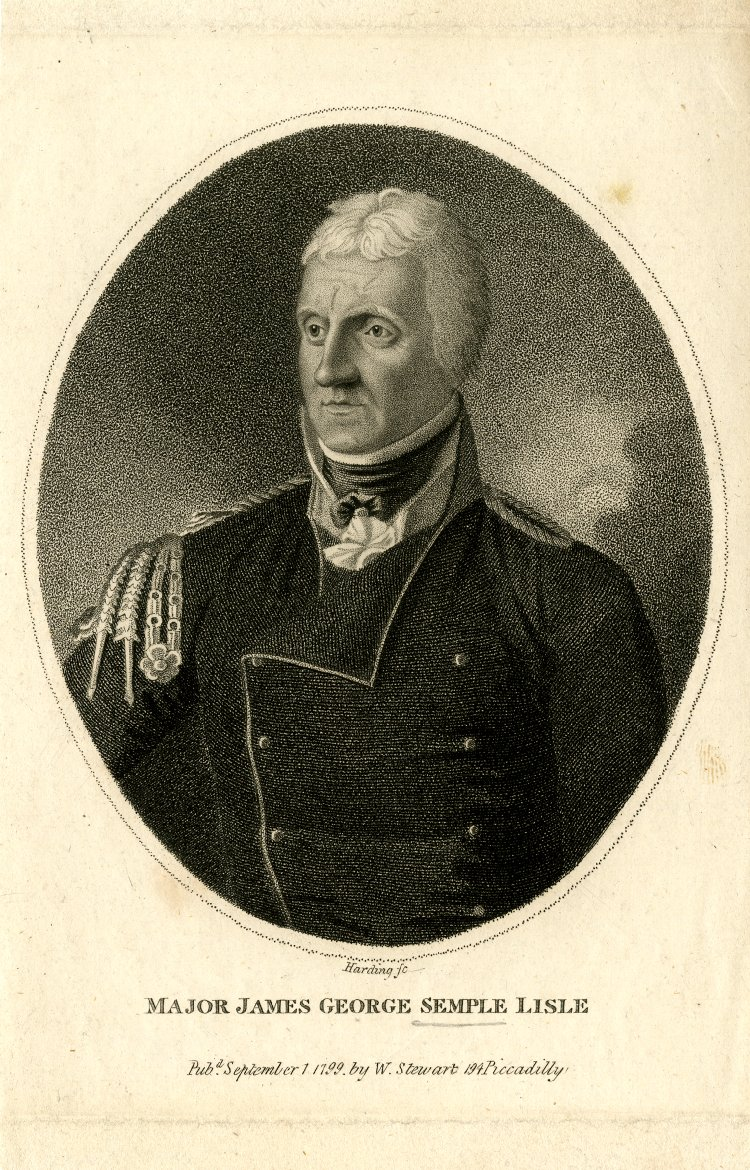
James George Semple Lisle, 1799 engraving

James George Semple Lisle (1759–1815) was a Scottish adventurer and Swindler. He used numerous aliases, taking Lisle as a surname additional to his original name, and published in 1799 The Life of Major J. G. Semple-Lisle, an autobiography, from Tothill Fields Prison.

== Life ==
He was born James George Semple at Irvine, Ayrshire, the son of James Semple, an exciseman and peerage claimant to the title Viscount Lisle. In 1776 he was soldier serving in British North America, was taken prisoner in the American Revolutionary War, then was released and came back to Great Britain.

Semple came to know the novelist Elizabeth Sarah Gooch, with whom he had a brief relationship. Marrying a goddaughter of Elizabeth Pierrepont, Duchess of Kingston-upon-Hull, he accompanied the latter to the continent of Europe. He made autobiographical claims about this period to 1784, involving Frederick the Great during his bloodless campaign of 1778, Catharine of Russia, and Prince Potemkin. He also visited Copenhagen.

Returning to England in 1784, Semple was arrested for obtaining goods by false pretences, and on 2 September 1786 was sentenced to seven years' transportation. Released on condition of leaving England, he went to Paris: he later claimed to have served on General Jean-François Berruyer's staff, and so to have witnessed in the execution of Louis XVI. Back England to avoid arrest, he was again, on 18 February 1795, sentenced to transportation for defrauding tradesmen. In Newgate Prison that year he had dinner with James Boswell, to whom as a lawyer he applied for help with his case.

Unable to obtain a pardon, Semple stabbed himself in Newgate Prison in 1796, when about to be shipped for Botany Bay, and then tried to starve himself to death. He recovered, however, and in 1798 was despatched in the Lady Jane Shore transport, bound for Australia. During the voyage a mutiny broke out, Semple's warning of the plot having been disregarded by the captain, Wilcox. Semple, with several others, was allowed to put off in a boat, landed in South America, and, after adventures, reached Tangier, where he gave himself up, and was sent back to England.

Semple was committed to Tothill Fields prison, and at the time of publishing his autobiography in 1799 was still confined there. In 1804 he offered himself to the government, as a spy. In 1807 he was charged with fraud, but was acquitted. In 1814 he was once again sentenced to transportation, in a fraud case for food. Pardoned by the Prince Regent, he undertook to go to Morocco, and died in Lisbon in 1815.
