= List of listed buildings in Irvine, North Ayrshire =

Legally protected buildings in a parish in Scotland

This is a list of listed buildings in the parish of Irvine in North Ayrshire, Scotland.

== List ==
Name	Location	Date Listed	Grid Ref. (Note: Sometimes known as OSGB36, the grid reference (where provided) is based on the British national grid reference system used by the Ordnance Survey. • "Guide to National Grid". Ordnance Survey. • "Get-a-map". Ordnance Survey.)	Geo-coordinates	Notes	LB Number (Note: Historic Environment Scotland assign a unique alphanumeric identifier to each designated site in Scotland, for listed buildings this always begins with "LB", for example "LB12345".)	Image
28-32 (Even Nos) Ballot Road, Former Hosiery Factory				55°36′58″N 4°39′38″W	Category C(S)	44632	Upload Photo
14 And 16 Burns Street				55°37′06″N 4°40′09″W	Category C(S)	44647	Upload Photo
22 Eglinton Street, Eglinton House				55°37′02″N 4°40′06″W	Category B	44659	Upload Photo
28 Eglinton Street, Irvine Burns Club				55°37′03″N 4°40′07″W	Category B	44660	Upload Photo
High Street, War Memorial				55°36′51″N 4°39′54″W	Category B	44668	Upload Photo
131, 135 And 137 High Street				55°36′55″N 4°40′04″W	Category C(S)	44676	Upload Photo
153 And 155 High Street				55°36′56″N 4°40′06″W	Category C(S)	44680	Upload Photo
152 High Street				55°36′56″N 4°40′03″W	Category C(S)	44685	Upload Photo
55 Kirkgate				55°36′48″N 4°40′01″W	Category C(S)	44696	Upload Photo
32 Kilwinning Road Including Boundary Walls				55°37′26″N 4°40′18″W	Category C(S)	44703	Upload Photo
27-35 (Odd Nos) Townhead				55°36′48″N 4°39′42″W	Category C(S)	44709	Upload Photo
112 And 114 High Street, Eglinton Arms Hotel				55°36′54″N 4°40′01″W	Category B	35425	Upload Photo
19 Hill Street				55°36′51″N 4°40′05″W	Category B	35436	Upload Photo
21 Hill Street				55°36′51″N 4°40′05″W	Category C(S)	35437	Upload Photo
28 Castle Street, Castle Grange Including Boundary Walls				55°37′02″N 4°40′14″W	Category B	35440	Upload Photo
44 Harbour Street				55°36′32″N 4°40′53″W	Category C(S)	35446	Upload Photo
Church Street, Fullarton Parish Church Including Former Schoolhouse				55°36′51″N 4°40′31″W	Category C(S)	35413	Upload Photo
Towns Moor, Burns Statue				55°37′16″N 4°40′26″W	Category B	35418	Upload Photo
Bank Street, Irvine Baptist Chapel				55°36′56″N 4°39′56″W	Category C(S)	44633	Upload Photo
79 And 81 Bank Street, Including Outbuildings, Boundary Walls And Gatepiers				55°37′03″N 4°39′39″W	Category C(S)	44640	Upload Photo
8, 10 And 12 Burns Street				55°37′05″N 4°40′08″W	Category C(S)	44646	Upload Photo
46, 48 And 50 Burns Street				55°37′08″N 4°40′10″W	Category C(S)	44651	Upload Photo
Castle Street, Annfield, Including Outbuildings And Boundary Walls				55°37′03″N 4°40′17″W	Category B	44652	Upload Photo
7 And 9 Eglinton Street				55°37′00″N 4°40′07″W	Category C(S)	44657	Upload Photo
12-18 (Even Nos) Eglinton Street				55°37′01″N 4°40′06″W	Category C(S)	44658	Upload Photo
50 Harbour Street				55°36′32″N 4°40′53″W	Category C(S)	44664	Upload Photo
61 And 63 High Street				55°36′51″N 4°39′58″W	Category C(S)	44669	Upload Photo
148 High Street				55°36′56″N 4°40′03″W	Category C(S)	44684	Upload Photo
Knadherhill Cemetery, Gate Lodge, Including Entrance, Gates, Gatepiers And Railings				55°37′35″N 4°39′00″W	Category C(S)	44704	Upload Photo
10 West Road Including Boundary Walls				55°36′56″N 4°40′12″W	Category C(S)	44716	Upload Photo
28 West Road, Violet Bank, Including Boundary Walls And Outbuildings				55°36′59″N 4°40′16″W	Category C(S)	44717	Upload Photo
Queen's Bridge				55°37′23″N 4°40′55″W	Category B	35419	Upload Photo
57 And 59 High Street And 2 Kirkgate				55°36′51″N 4°39′57″W	Category B	35427	Upload Photo
45 Townhead				55°36′49″N 4°39′46″W	Category B	35428	Upload Photo
11 Seagate				55°36′59″N 4°40′09″W	Category C(S)	35439	Upload Photo
Kirkgate, Irvine Old Parish Church And Graveyard, Including Boundary Walls And Gatepiers				55°36′45″N 4°39′56″W	Category A	35409	Upload another image See more images
Kidsneuk Cottage, 6, 7 Ravenspark Golf Course				55°37′53″N 4°40′49″W	Category C(S)	7644	Upload Photo
Stane Castle				55°37′29″N 4°38′30″W	Category B	7645	Upload Photo
Littlestone Farmhouse And Adjoining Farm Buildings, Lawthorn				55°38′00″N 4°38′11″W	Category C(S)	7649	Upload Photo
46 And 48 Harbour Street				55°36′32″N 4°40′52″W	Category C(S)	44663	Upload Photo
58 Harbour Street				55°36′31″N 4°40′54″W	Category C(S)	44666	Upload Photo
139, 141 And 143 High Street				55°36′55″N 4°40′05″W	Category C(S)	44677	Upload Photo
151 High Street				55°36′56″N 4°40′05″W	Category B	44679	Upload Photo
130 And 132 High Street				55°36′55″N 4°40′02″W	Category C(S)	44683	Upload Photo
9, 11 And 13 Hill Street				55°36′50″N 4°40′04″W	Category C(S)	44688	Upload Photo
14 Hill Street				55°36′50″N 4°40′02″W	Category B	44689	Upload Photo
56 And 58 Townhead				55°36′50″N 4°39′47″W	Category C(S)	44711	Upload Photo
25 And 27 West Road Including Boundary Wall				55°36′58″N 4°40′16″W	Category B	44715	Upload Photo
67 And 69 High Street, Royal Bank Of Scotland				55°36′51″N 4°40′00″W	Category B	35426	Upload Photo
15 Hill Street				55°36′51″N 4°40′04″W	Category C(S)	35434	Upload Photo
2 Lowgreen Road, Ivybank				55°36′51″N 4°40′13″W	Category B	35438	Upload Photo
111 Montgomery Street With Boundary Walls				55°36′39″N 4°40′38″W	Category B	35416	Upload Photo
11 Annick Road Mayflower, Including Boundary Wall				55°36′46″N 4°39′29″W	Category C(S)	44630	Upload Photo
5 And 7 Bank Street				55°36′54″N 4°40′00″W	Category C(S)	44635	Upload Photo
227 Bank Street Including Boundary Walls And Gatepiers				55°37′28″N 4°38′58″W	Category C(S)	44641	Upload Photo
32-44 (Even Nos) Burns Street				55°37′08″N 4°40′10″W	Category C(S)	44650	Upload Photo
77-83 (Odd Nos) High Street				55°36′52″N 4°39′59″W	Category B	44672	Upload Photo
117 And 119 High Street				55°36′54″N 4°40′04″W	Category C(S)	44674	Upload Photo
9 Kilwinning Road, Including Boundary Walls And Gatepiers				55°37′12″N 4°40′16″W	Category B	44701	Upload Photo
13 West Road				55°36′54″N 4°40′15″W	Category C(S)	44712	Upload Photo
23 West Road Including Boundary Walls				55°36′57″N 4°40′16″W	Category C(S)	44714	Upload Photo
Castle Street, Statue				55°37′01″N 4°40′18″W	Category B	35420	Upload Photo
Golffields, Powder House				55°36′39″N 4°39′46″W	Category B	35422	Upload Photo
Kilwinning Road, Heathfield House				55°37′10″N 4°40′14″W	Category B	35441	Upload Photo
12 Kilwinning Road, Hamilfield, Including Outbuildings, Boundary Walls And Gatepiers				55°37′17″N 4°40′13″W	Category B	35442	Upload Photo
52 And 54 Harbour Street				55°36′31″N 4°40′53″W	Category C(S)	35447	Upload Photo
Bridgegate, Trinity Church, Latterly Community Centre, With Hall, Approach Wall, Piers And Railings				55°36′49″N 4°40′07″W	Category A	35410	Upload another image
West Road, Former Relief United Presbyterian Church				55°36′53″N 4°40′09″W	Category B	35411	Upload Photo
4 Glasgow Vennel, Burn's Lodging House				55°36′51″N 4°39′47″W	Category B	35415	Upload Photo
18, 20 And 22 (Even Nos) Burns Street				55°37′06″N 4°40′09″W	Category C(S)	44648	Upload Photo
Castle Street, 25-29 (Inclusive Nos) Academy Court				55°37′03″N 4°40′11″W	Category B	44653	Upload Photo
65 High Street				55°36′51″N 4°39′58″W	Category B	44670	Upload Photo
71, 73 And 75 High Street				55°36′52″N 4°39′59″W	Category C(S)	44671	Upload Photo
95 And 97 High Street				55°36′53″N 4°40′01″W	Category C(S)	44673	Upload Photo
49 Kirkgate				55°36′47″N 4°40′01″W	Category C(S)	44694	Upload Photo
51 And 53 Kirkgate				55°36′47″N 4°40′01″W	Category B	44695	Upload Photo
30 Kirkgate And 1 Hill Street, Old Manse				55°36′48″N 4°40′02″W	Category B	35431	Upload Photo
7 Hill Street				55°36′50″N 4°40′04″W	Category C(S)	35433	Upload Photo
10 And 12 Harbour Street				55°36′35″N 4°40′46″W	Category B	35444	Upload Photo
14 Harbour Street				55°36′35″N 4°40′47″W	Category B	35445	Upload Photo
174 Harbour Street, Harbour Master's Office, Including Boundary Walls And Outbuildings				55°36′27″N 4°41′21″W	Category C(S)	35448	Upload Photo
25 Bank Street, Templars Hall				55°36′57″N 4°39′55″W	Category C(S)	44638	Upload Photo
2, 4 And 6 Bank Street And 108 High Street				55°36′53″N 4°39′59″W	Category C(S)	44642	Upload Photo
24-30 (Even Nos) Burns Street				55°37′07″N 4°40′09″W	Category C(S)	44649	Upload Photo
32 And 34 Eglinton Street, Turf Hotel				55°37′04″N 4°40′07″W	Category C(S)	44661	Upload Photo
157 High Street				55°36′56″N 4°40′06″W	Category C(S)	44681	Upload Photo
26 And 28 Hill Street				55°36′51″N 4°40′04″W	Category C(S)	44691	Upload Photo
43 Kirkgate				55°36′46″N 4°40′00″W	Category B	44692	Upload Photo
26 Kirkgate Including Boundary Walls				55°36′49″N 4°40′00″W	Category C(S)	44698	Upload Photo
3 Kilwinning Road, Laurelbank, Including Boundary Walls And Gatepiers				55°37′07″N 4°40′13″W	Category C(S)	44699	Upload Photo
14 Kilwinning Road, Campbellfield, Including Boundary Walls And Gatepiers				55°37′19″N 4°40′13″W	Category B	44702	Upload Photo
New Street, Railway Station				55°36′40″N 4°40′28″W	Category C(S)	44705	Upload Photo
24 Seagate With Gatepiers				55°37′01″N 4°40′15″W	Category C(S)	44708	Upload Photo
47 And 49 Townhead				55°36′49″N 4°39′47″W	Category B	44710	Upload Photo
Seagate, Seagate Castle				55°37′01″N 4°40′14″W	Category A	35421	Upload Photo
113 And 115 High Street, King's Arms Hotel				55°36′54″N 4°40′04″W	Category C(S)	35424	Upload Photo
3 And 5 Hill Street				55°36′49″N 4°40′03″W	Category C(S)	35432	Upload Photo
8 Harbour Street				55°36′35″N 4°40′45″W	Category B	35443	Upload Photo
Harbour Pilot House				55°36′20″N 4°41′39″W	Category B	35449	Upload Photo
Stanecastle Gates				55°37′31″N 4°38′33″W	Category B	7646	Upload Photo
56 Harbour Street				55°36′31″N 4°40′54″W	Category C(S)	44665	Upload Photo
18 Annick Road				55°36′48″N 4°39′30″W	Category C(S)	44631	Upload Photo
1, 3 Bank Street And 110 High Street				55°36′54″N 4°40′01″W	Category B	44634	Upload Photo
9, 11 And 13 Bank Street				55°36′54″N 4°40′00″W	Category C(S)	44636	Upload Photo
Harbour Street, Marina Inn, Including Outbuildings And Boundary Walls				55°36′28″N 4°41′09″W	Category C(S)	44667	Upload Photo
127 And 129 High Street				55°36′55″N 4°40′04″W	Category C(S)	44675	Upload Photo
145, 147 And 149 High Street				55°36′56″N 4°40′05″W	Category B	44678	Upload Photo
82-106 (Even Nos) High Street				55°36′53″N 4°39′59″W	Category C(S)	44682	Upload Photo
20 Hill Street				55°36′50″N 4°40′03″W	Category C(S)	44690	Upload Photo
4 Kilwinning Road, Including Boundary Walls And Gatepiers				55°37′14″N 4°40′11″W	Category B	44700	Upload Photo
23 Quarry Road Including Boundary Walls				55°37′09″N 4°40′02″W	Category C(S)	44706	Upload Photo
17 Hill Street				55°36′51″N 4°40′05″W	Category C(S)	35435	Upload Photo
Harbour Street, Scottish Maritime Museum, Sv Carrick				55°36′43″N 4°40′45″W	Category A	35451	Upload Photo
Ayrshire Central Hospital, Administration Building, Maternity Residences And Gatelodge				55°38′05″N 4°40′23″W	Category B	35452	Upload Photo
High Street, Court House With Lamp Standards				55°36′53″N 4°39′56″W	Category B	35414	Upload another image
Academy Road, Old Irvine Academy, Including Outbuildings, Boundary Walls And Gatepiers				55°37′06″N 4°40′17″W	Category B	35417	Upload Photo
Lawthorn Farmhouse And Attached Farm Buildings, Lawthorn				55°37′59″N 4°37′34″W	Category B	7647	Upload Photo
Lawthorn Bank, Perceton				55°37′53″N 4°37′20″W	Category C(S)	7648	Upload Photo
21 And 23 Bank Street				55°36′56″N 4°39′56″W	Category C(S)	44637	Upload Photo
57 Bank Street				55°37′00″N 4°39′46″W	Category C(S)	44639	Upload Photo
20 Bank Street				55°36′54″N 4°39′56″W	Category B	44643	Upload Photo
60 Bank Street				55°36′59″N 4°39′45″W	Category B	44644	Upload Photo
1 And 3 Bridgegate				55°36′53″N 4°40′01″W	Category B	44645	Upload Photo
40 Harbour Street				55°36′33″N 4°40′51″W	Category C(S)	44662	Upload Photo
156 And 158 High Street				55°36′57″N 4°40′03″W	Category C(S)	44686	Upload Photo
162 High Street, The Crown Inn				55°36′58″N 4°40′04″W	Category C(S)	44687	Upload Photo
45 And 47 Kirkgate				55°36′47″N 4°40′01″W	Category B	44693	Upload Photo
57 Kirkgate				55°36′47″N 4°40′02″W	Category C(S)	44697	Upload Photo
17 West Road Including Boundary Walls And Outbuildings				55°36′56″N 4°40′15″W	Category C(S)	44713	Upload Photo
Gottries Road, Linthouse Building, Scottish Maritime Museum				55°36′40″N 4°40′45″W	Category A	35450	Upload another image
West Road, Mure Church (Church Of Scotland), With Adjoining Hall, Gatepiers, Gates, Boundary Walls And Railings				55°36′54″N 4°40′12″W	Category B	35412	Upload Photo
Girdle Cottage, Girdle Toll				55°37′45″N 4°38′14″W	Category C(S)	13664	Upload Photo

== Key ==
The scheme for classifying buildings in Scotland is:

- Category A: "buildings of national or international importance, either architectural or historic; or fine, little-altered examples of some particular period, style or building type."
- Category B: "buildings of regional or more than local importance; or major examples of some particular period, style or building type, which may have been altered."
- Category C: "buildings of local importance; lesser examples of any period, style, or building type, as originally constructed or moderately altered; and simple traditional buildings which group well with other listed buildings."

In March 2016 there were 47,288 listed buildings in Scotland. Of these, 8% were Category A, and 50% were Category B, with the remaining 42% being Category C.

== See also ==
- List of listed buildings in North Ayrshire
