= Irvine Beat FM =

Coordinates: 55°36′27″N 4°40′26″W

Irvine, North Ayrshire; Scotland
- Frequency: 107.2 MHz

Programming
- Format: Popular Music and Local Speech

History
- First air date: 12 August 2013

Links
- Website: http://www.irvinebeatfm.co.uk

Irvine Beat FM is a community radio station based in the North Ayrshire town of Irvine serving the Fullarton, Harbourside, Redburn, Vineburgh and Castlepark areas with a potential audience of 17,000.

The station is a Scottish Registered Charity (SCIO) and is staffed mainly by volunteers with the addition of one full-time employee. The station broadcasts 24 hours a day on 107.2FM and online. The main aim of the station is to increase social conditions and health within the broadcast area, which is listed within the lowest 20% on the Scottish Index of Multiple Deprivation. Irvine Beat FM's playlist is a mix of chart hits from the 1960s through to current chart music.

The station features a mix of presenters who have little radio experience, to various experienced professional presenters of all ages. Some names include Tommy Truesdale, Stuart Rodgers, Dawn Jamison, Chris Houston and Iain Rose. A number of former commercial West Sound Radio presenters are on the schedule.

In August 2018, the station celebrated its first five years and also started a new five year licence. A special show was aired during the station's usual Sunday Talk in slot that week. It was presented by Chris Houston and featured many of the station's presenters.

In March 2020 according to Irvine Beat FM's website, Irvine Beat FM announced their studios would close as a result of the COVID-19 pandemic. Some of their presenters would continue broadcasting from their homes. A major change to the scheduling happened and during lockdown, the majority of presenters remained on air including Lunchtime presenters Chris Houston and Barry Reilly. Stuart Rodgers was temporarily replaced by David Gallacher and Andy Rutherford.

From 6 July 2020, the station's schedule returned to normal with some presenters still broadcasting from their homes and some back in the studio.
