= John Ferguson (Ferguson bequest) =

Scottish businessman and philanthropist (1787 - 1856)

- Born: 28 February 1787; Irvine, Ayrshire
- Died: 8 January 1856 (aged 68)
- Occupation: Ferguson Bequest Fund (founder)
- Parents: William Ferguson (father); Mary Ferguson (mother)

John Ferguson (28 February 1787–8 January 1856), was a Scottish businessman and philanthropist. He was the founder of the Ferguson Bequest Fund.

Ferguson was born at Irvine, Ayrshire, 28 February 1787. His father, William Ferguson, was a shipmaster of that port, and his mother, Mary, was the only daughter of John Service of Holms of Caaf, a small property near Dalry, Ayrshire. The Services were an Ayrshire family, some of whom had been lenders of money. The father of Mary Service followed this profession, and was a man of penurious habits and peevish temper. His sons one after another left him for America, where they were under the shelter of an uncle. Ferguson was educated at Ayr, was for some time in a banker's office, went to America in connection with the affairs of one of his uncles, returned after four years, and in 1810 settled with his mother at Irvine. She succeeded to large sums on the death of her brother George and then of her father. The fortune of the Fergusons was increased by the death in 1828 of another uncle, who left 200,000l., and of a third who died in 1842 and left 400,000l. These brothers seem to have had no aim in life but to amass money.

Ferguson, by his sagacity and knowledge of the money market, increased the fortune, till at his death it amounted to 1,247,514l. 14s. 5d. He was a man of somewhat ordinary character, undecided, was never married, and for the last few years of his life lived in comparative seclusion. After consulting with Mr. John Henderson of Park, a well-known merchant of Glasgow, who was his intimate friend and acted as his private banker, and Mr. Matthew Montgomery of Kelvinside, he devoted the residue of his property, after providing for family legacies and making other provisions, to the objects of what is known as the Ferguson Bequest Fund. The sum available for it was no less than 400,000l. The trustees were instructed to devote the interest 'towards the maintenance and promotion of religious ordinances and education and missionary operations; in the first instance in the county of Ayr, stewartry of Kirkcudbright, and counties of Wigton, Lanark, Renfrew, and Dumbarton.’ This was to be done by means of payments for the erection and support of churches and schools, other than parish churches and schools, in connection with the quoad sacra churches of the established Church of Scotland, the Free Church, the United Presbyterian Church, the Reformed Presbyterian Church, and the congregational or independent church, all in Scotland.

The administration of this fund was committed to a permanent body of trustees, of whom three were to be of the established church, four of the free, four of the united presbyterian, one of the reformed presbyterian, and one of the independent church. Among the purposes to which the Ferguson trustees devoted another part of Ferguson's estate was the founding of scholarships in connection with the Scottish universities. These are six in number, of the annual value of 80l. each, tenable for two years—one for classical, another for mathematical, and the third for philosophical eminence. The scholarships may be competed for by students of any of the Scottish universities who have taken the degree of M.A., or have qualified for that degree within the two years preceding. The administration of the fund is conducted by the permanent trustees under the superintendency of Mathew Stobie Tait, by whom an annual report is prepared and submitted to the trustees.

Ferguson signed his will at Glasgow on 22 September 1855, and soon after his health began to fail. It is said that after this he got a friend to make up a statement of his property, and when the amount was stated at nearly a million and a quarter he could not believe it to be so much. He died on 8 January 1856, having nearly completed his sixty-ninth year.
