= Irvine Townhouse =

Municipal building in Irvine, Scotland

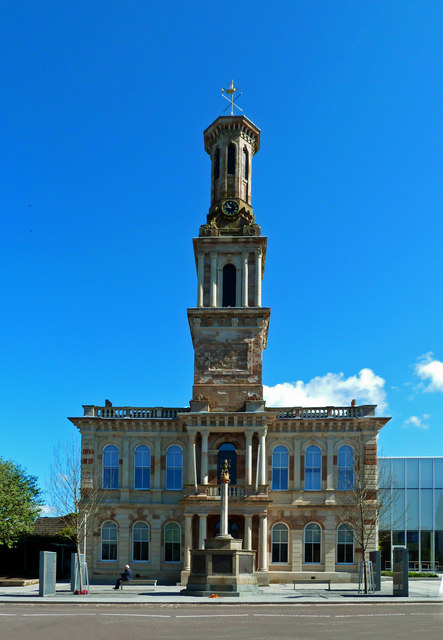
- Irvine Townhouse

- Shown in North Ayrshire
- 55.6144°N 4.6654°W
- Location: High Street, Irvine

History
- Built: 1862

Site notes
- Architect: James Ingram
- Architectural style: Italianate style

Listed Building – Category B
- Official name: High Street, Court House with Lamp Standards
- Designated: 18 April 1971
- Reference no.: LB35414

Irvine Townhouse is a municipal building in the High Street, Irvine, North Ayrshire, Scotland. The townhouse, which was the headquarters of Irvine Burgh Council, is a Category B listed building.

== History ==
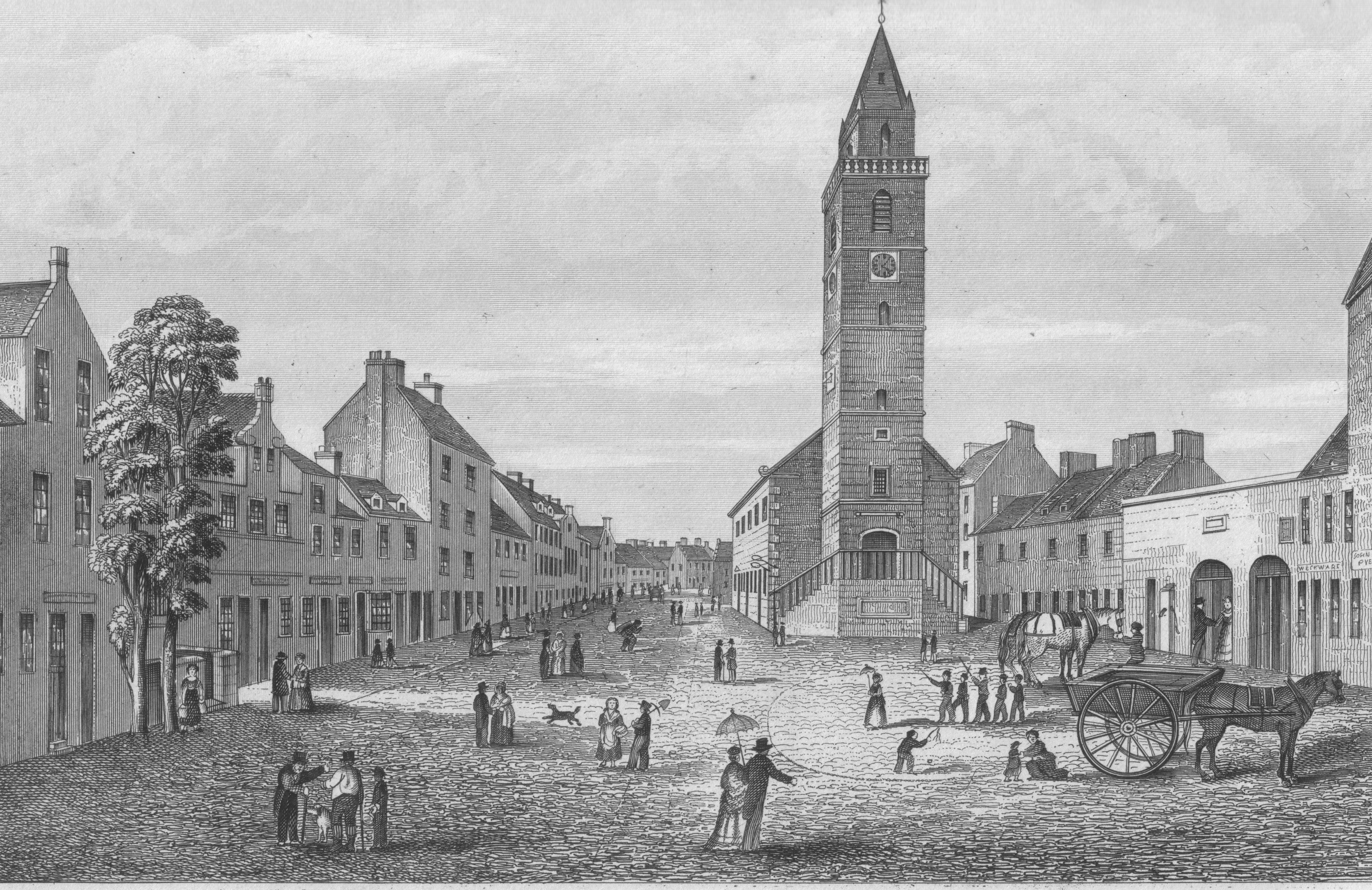
The old tollbooth in Irvine High Street

The townhouse was commissioned to replace an old 14th century tolbooth which had been built in the middle of the High Street on land granted by King Robert II in 1386. In the early 1850s, civic leaders decided that the old building was an obstruction to road traffic and procured a new townhouse on the site of an old flesh market slightly to the northeast of the original building.

The foundation stone for the new building was laid by the bailie, John Niven, in 1860. It was designed by James Ingram of Kilmarnock in the Italianate style, built by Walter McLachlan in ashlar stone at a cost of £4,000 and officially opened in May 1862. The design involved a symmetrical main frontage with seven bays facing onto the High Street; the central bay featured portico with two pairs Doric order columns supporting an entablature; on the first floor there was a balcony and a doorway with a fanlight flanked by two more pairs of Doric order columns supporting a cornice and a balustrade. At roof level there was a four-stage clock tower which was 120 feet (37 m) high. The fourth stage, which consisted of an octagonal roof lantern, supported a weather vane in the form of a sloop which had been recovered from the old tolbooth. Internally, the principal rooms were the council chamber, the courtroom and the library. The foyer featured a tiled floor inlaid with the town's motto Tandem Bona Causa Triumphat (English: Good reason will eventually triumph).

A war memorial in the form of a mercat cross on an octagonal base was installed in front of the town hall in 1920.

Queen Elizabeth II, accompanied by the Duke of Edinburgh, visited the townhouse during a tour of North Ayrshire in July 1956. The building continued to serve as the headquarters of Irvine Burgh Council for much of the 20th century but ceased to be the local seat of government when the enlarged and newly formed Cunninghame District Council moved into Cunninghame House in 1976.

The townhouse was subsequently remodelled and integrated into a new community, cultural and leisure centre known as "The Portal", which was designed by LA Architects, built at a cost of £20 million and officially opened in February 2017. The works included the full restoration of the townhouse to enable it to be used by the public as a centre for the study of family history and genealogy. It also involved the conversion of the courtroom into a reception room suitable for hosting weddings and civil partnership ceremonies. The frieze in the former courtroom, bearing the inscription Lyra Triplex cui Diedama Triplex (English: Triple praise for the one with a triple crown), was also restored. The triple crown recalls an inscription in the old tollbooth which commemorated the Union of the Crowns of 1603.

== See also ==
- List of listed buildings in Irvine, North Ayrshire
