= Marty Hay =

Scottish cricketer and educator

Personal information
- Full name: Martyn James Hay
- Born: 24 May 1976 (age 50); Irvine, Ayrshire, Scotland
- Batting: Right-handed
- Bowling: Right-arm medium

Domestic team information
- Years: Team
- 1999: Scotland

Career statistics
Competition	First-class	List A
Matches	2	2
Runs scored	10	0
Batting average	3.33	–
100s/50s	–/–	–/–
Top score	7	–
Balls bowled	114	108
Wickets	0	2
Bowling average	–	37.00
5 wickets in innings	–	–
10 wickets in match	–	–
Best bowling	–	1/32
Catches/stumpings	–/–	–/–
- Source: Cricinfo, 14 June 2022

Martyn 'Marty' James Hay (born 24 May 1976) is a Scottish former cricketer.

Hay was born at Irvine in May 1976. A club cricketer for Prestwick Cricket Club, Hay played for Scotland in the 1999 season. He made two first-class appearances against a touring South Africa Academy cricket team at Boghall, and Ireland at Ormeau. He also made two List A one-day appearances in the NatWest Trophy against the Nottinghamshire Cricket Board in the 1st round of the competition, followed by Dorset in the 2nd round. Hay took his only senior wickets in these matches, taking a wicket apiece in each. He later briefly played club cricket for Ayr Cricket Club, when he was signed by them in July 2001 for their British Cup match against Dunnington Cricket Club; it was hoped he would be a suitable counter to the presence of West Indians Alvin Kallicharran and Collis King in the Dunnington side.
