= John Keirs =

Scottish footballer

Personal information
- Full name: John Keirs
- Date of birth: 14 August 1947
- Place of birth: Irvine, Scotland
- Date of death: 27 December 1995 (aged 48)
- Place of death: Hastings, England
- Position: Central defender

Senior career*
| Years | Team | Apps | (Gls) |
| 1965–1971 | Charlton Athletic | 78 | (1) |
| 1971–1972 | Cape Town City | ? | (?) |
| 1972–1973 | Stevenage Athletic | 18 | (2) |
| 1973–1976 | Tonbridge | ? | (?) |
| 1976–1977 | Weymouth | ? | (6) |
| 1976–1977 | Margate | 3 | (1) |
| 1977–1978 | Maidstone United | ? | (?) |
| 1977–1978 | Folkestone Town | ? | (?) |
| 1978–1980 | Gravesend & Northfleet | 85 | (6) |
| 1980–1981 | Tonbridge Angels | ? | (?) |

Managerial career
- 1982–1985: Tonbridge Angels
- * Club domestic league appearances and goals

John Keirs (18 August 1947 – 27 December 1995) was a Scottish professional footballer who played in the Football League as a central defender.
