= Elizabeth Gooch =

English writer (1757–1807)

Elizabeth Sarah Gooch (27 June 1757 – June 1807) was an English writer.

== Biography ==
The daughter of William Villa-Real, she was born Elizabeth Sarah Villa-Real in Edwinstowe. Following her father's death, she received a substantial inheritance, but her mother arranged a marriage for her to William Gooch in 1775 before she realized that she was financially independent. Her husband took control of her money and abandoned her in Lille in 1778.

For a time, she was an actress with a theatre company in Portsmouth. She was also involved in liaisons with various princes and military leaders. By the time she published An Appeal to the Public in 1788, she had been imprisoned for debt. In 1792, she published the memoir The Life of Mrs. Gooch. She went on to publish a collection of poetry and a number of novels including The Contrast (1795), Fancied Events (1799), Truth and Fiction (1801), Sherwood Forest (1804) and Can We Doubt It (1806).

She died in Plymouth in 1807.

== External sites ==
- Corvey Women Writers on the Web author page
