= Irvine, North Ayrshire =

Coordinates: 55.6201°N 04.6614°W

Irvine: Scottish Gaelic: Irbhinn; Scots: Irvin
- Administrative centre and new town
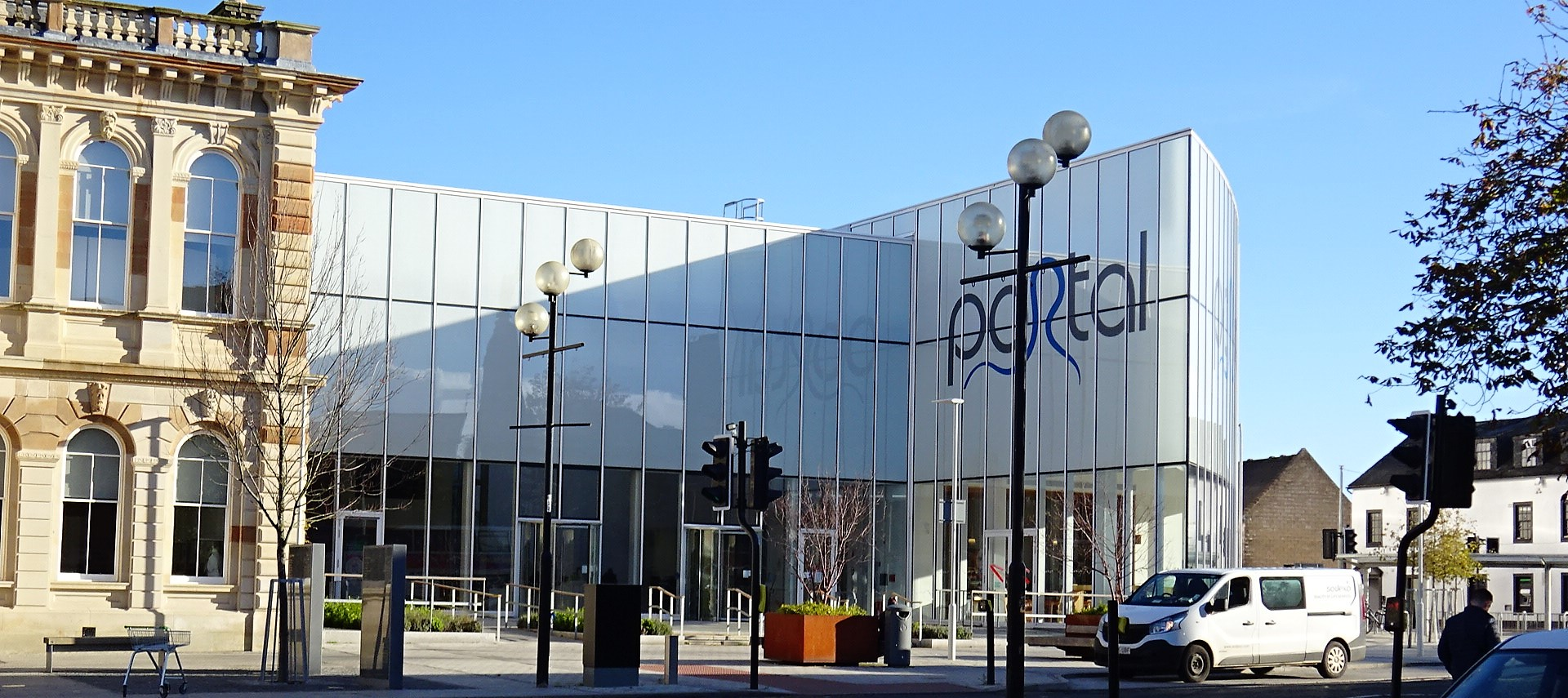
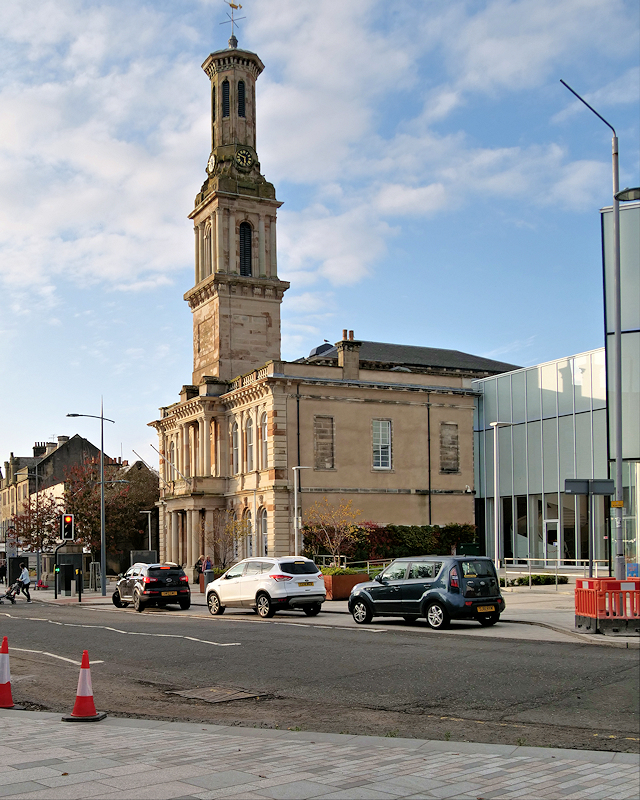
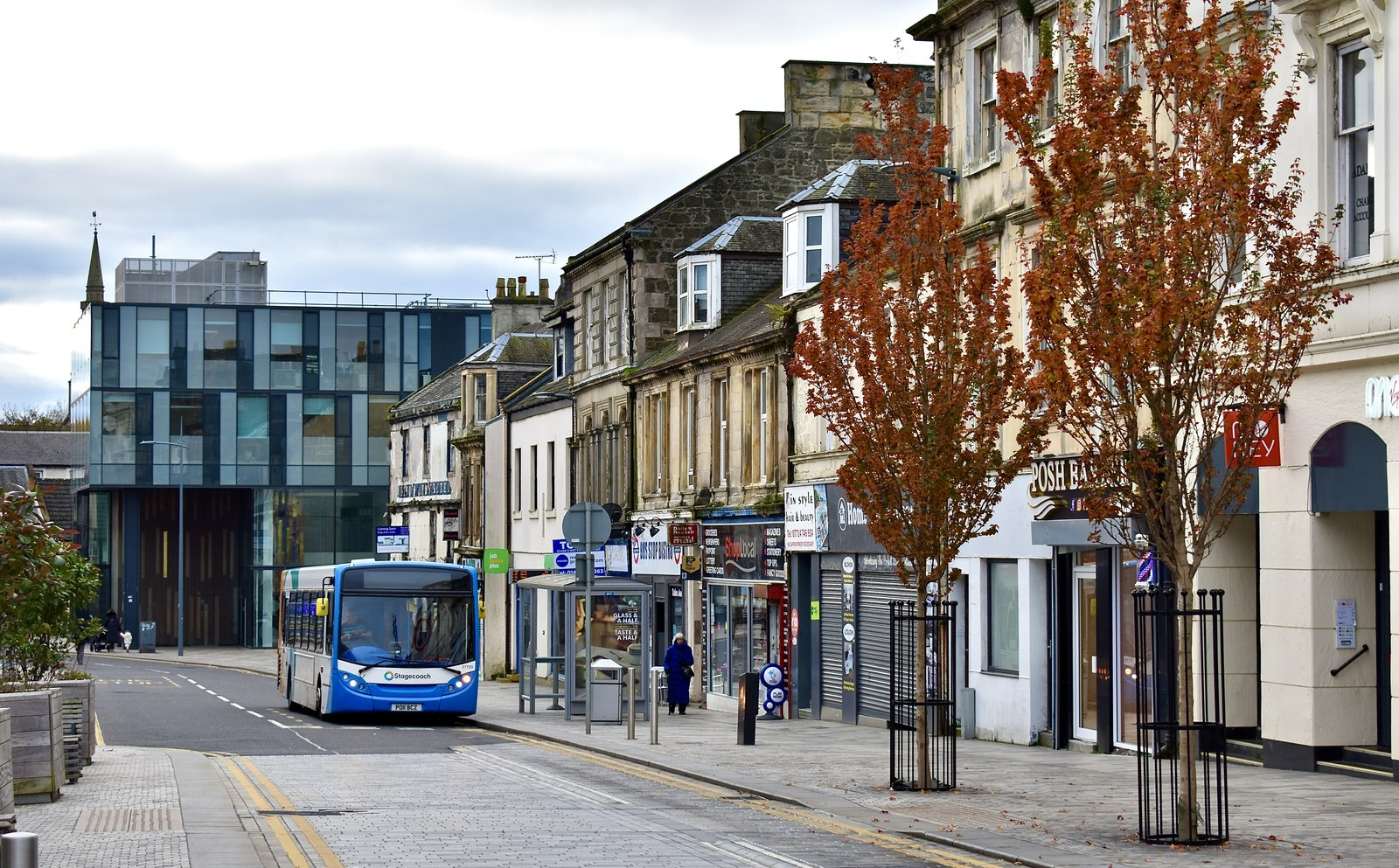
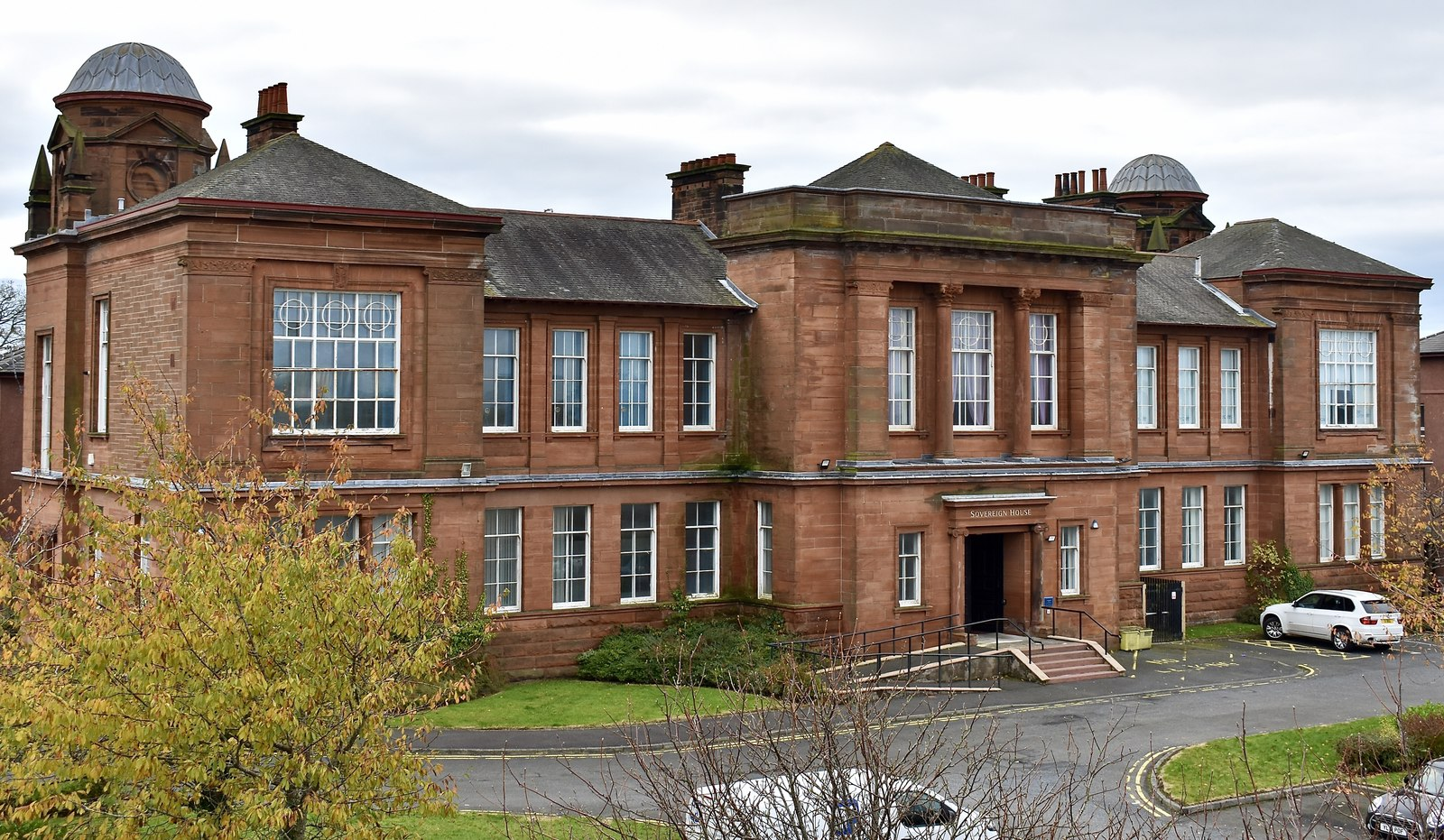
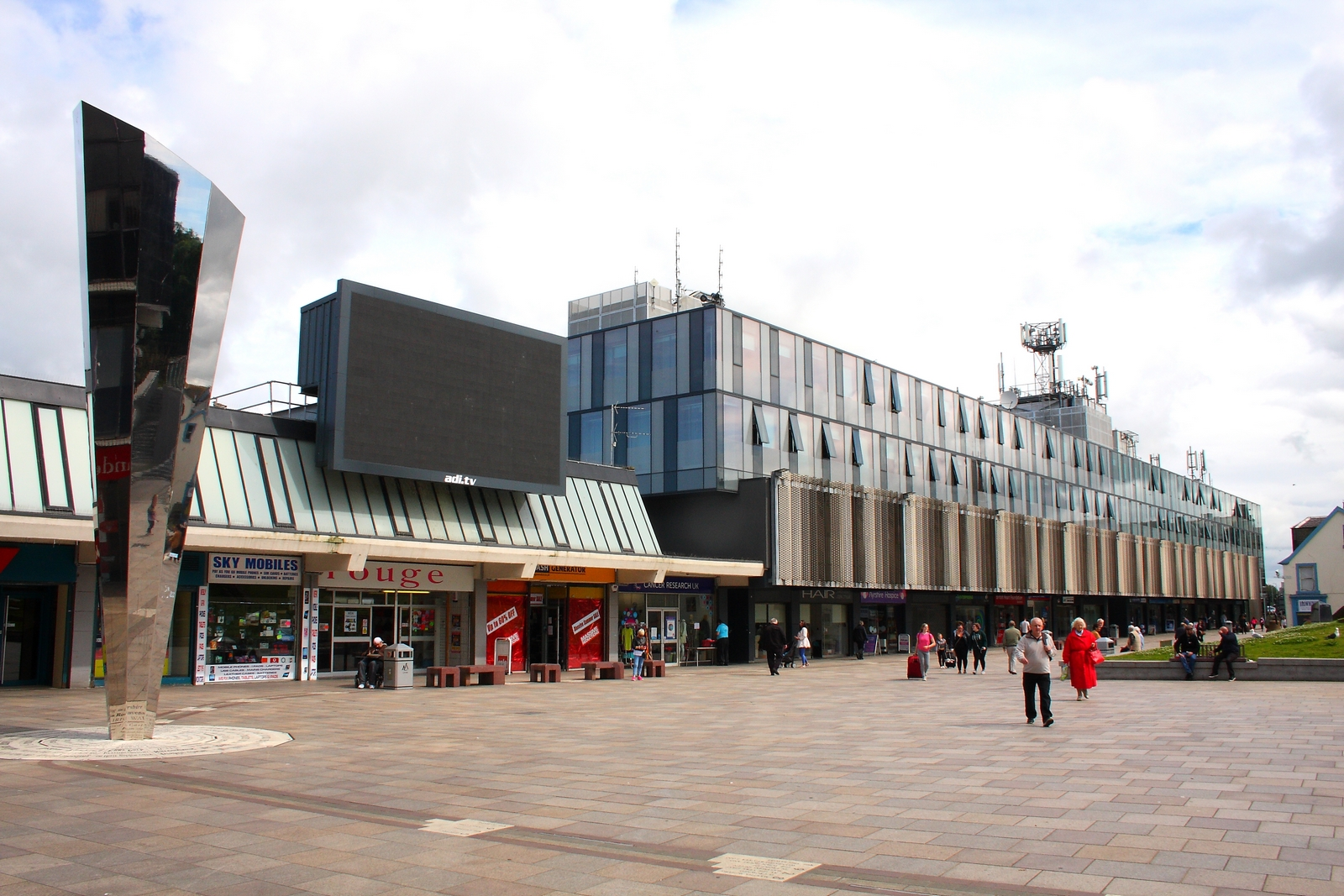
- The Portal Townhouse High Street Sovereign House Bridgegate

- Coat of Arms

- Location within North Ayrshire
- Population: 33,998 (2022)
- OS grid reference: NS325395
  - Edinburgh: 77.7 mi
  - London: 430.9 mi
- Council area: North Ayrshire
- Lieutenancy area: Ayrshire and Arran
- Country: Scotland
- Sovereign state: United Kingdom
- Post town: IRVINE
- Postcode district: KA11 – KA12
- Dialling code: 01294
- Police: Scotland
- Fire: Scottish
- Ambulance: Scottish
- UK Parliament: Central Ayrshire
- Scottish Parliament: Cunninghame South

Irvine (/ˈərvɪn/ UR-vin; Scots: Irvin [ˈɪrvɪn]; Scottish Gaelic: Irbhinn [ˈiɾʲivɪɲ]) is a town and former royal burgh on the coast of the Firth of Clyde in North Ayrshire, Scotland. In 2022, The town had a population of 33,998 inhabitants, making it the largest settlement in North Ayrshire, and 22nd largest settlement in Scotland.

Irvine was designated as the fifth and final Scottish new town in November 1966. Irvine is the administrative centre and the seat of the North Ayrshire Council administration which has its headquarters based at Cunninghame House. Irvine was the site of Scotland's 12th century military capital and former headquarters of the Lord High Constable of Scotland, Hugh de Morville. It also served as the capital of Cunninghame and was, at the time of David I, Robert II and Robert III, one of the earliest capitals of Scotland.

Despite being classed as a new town, Irvine has had a long history stretching back many centuries and was classed as a royal burgh. There are also conflicting rumours that Mary, Queen of Scots, stayed briefly at Seagate Castle. There is still a yearly festival, called Marymass, held in the town. Marymass refers to Mary Queen of Scots and is celebrated for around a week starting from the 15th of August, and was therefore Mary's Mass hence, Marymass. The town became a haunt of Robert Burns, after he briefly worked a flax-dresser in a heckling shop near the Glasgow Vennel. Two streets in the town are named after him: Burns Street and Burns Crescent.

== Etymology ==
One interpretation of the placename is that it means 'green river' as in the Welsh river named Irfon. It has had many variants, such as Irwyn (1322), Ervin (1259) Irewin (1429–30), Irrvin (1528), and Irwin (1537). Another author lists Yrewin, c.1140; Irvin, c.1230; Orewin, c.1295, with a meaning of 'west flowing river.' "Eriwine" and "Erwinne" are also old English first names. A parish in Annandale in Dumfriesshire has the name Irving. In the 12th century a Gilchrist, son of Eruini, witnessed a charter in Galloway and this is the earliest use of the name so far discovered.

== History ==
=== Prehistory ===
Part of modern Irvine contains the oldest continually inhabited village in Europe. Dreghorn, a separate village on the outskirts of Irvine, appears to contain archaeological remains dating back to the first incursions of humanity into Scotland (Mesolithic). Iron Age Hill forts are abundant around Dreghorn.

The Grannie stone (or Granny Stane) is described as "one of Irvine's prehistoric puzzles", this boulder is either left behind from the Ice Age or is the last remaining stone of a stone circle; others were removed, by blasting, after the Irvine weir was constructed in 1895, but popular protests saved this remaining stone. The Grannie Stane is visible when the water is low.

=== Middle Ages ===
The medieval parish of Irvine was one of the most important regions in Scotland. Originally the site of the Military Headquarters of the Lord High Constable of Scotland, and one of the earliest Scottish Capitals, it served as an HQ to no fewer than three kings. King John I of Scotland inherited the lordship of Irvine sometime in the mid-13th century. Robert the Bruce, in an attempt to seize John's lands, made sure that he secured the town. From Bruce, it passed to his grandson Robert the Steward, future King Robert II of Scotland.

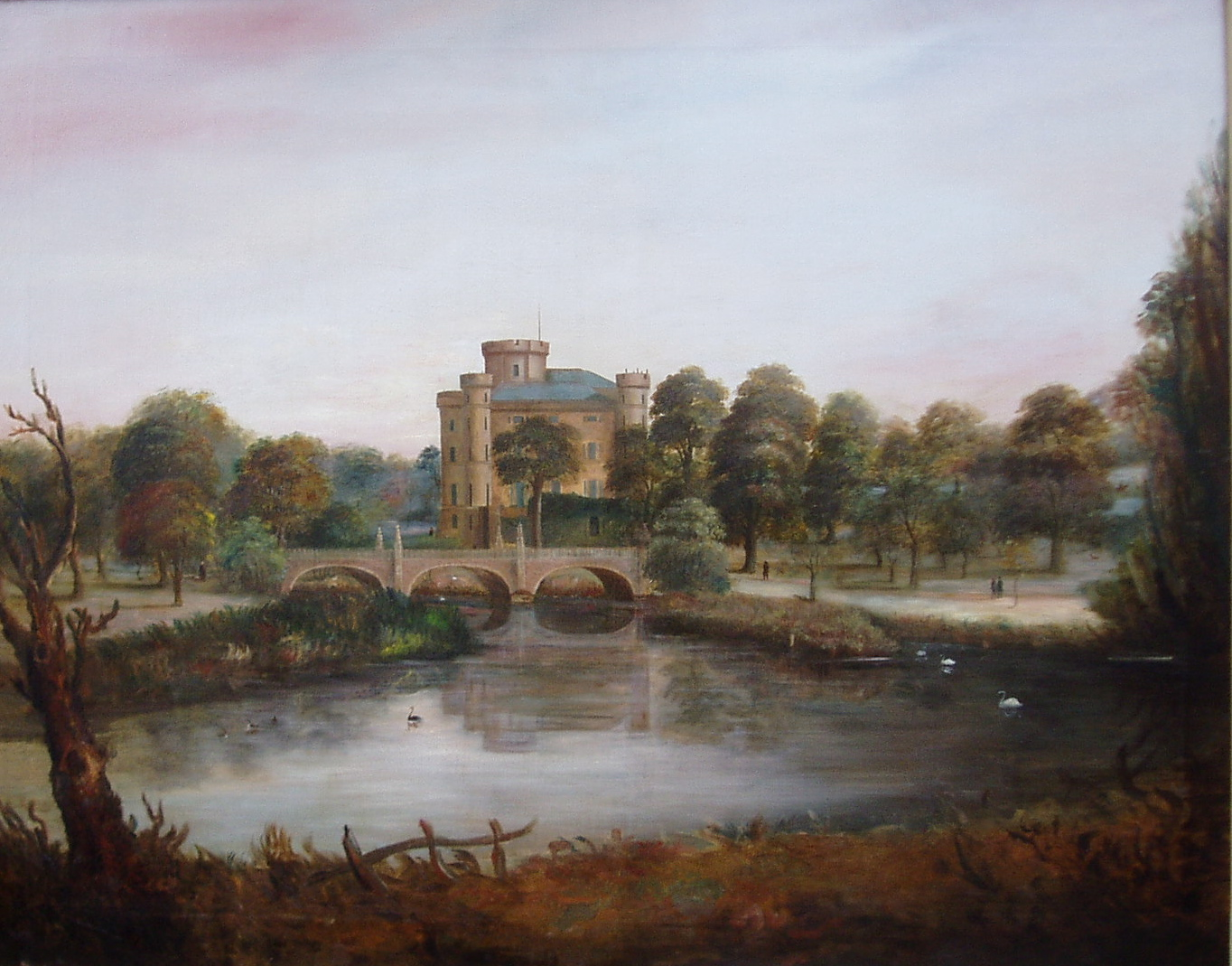
Eglinton Castle, home of the Earls of Eglinton, c. 1830s.

Irvine is the site of an incident in 1296 (during the Scottish Wars of Independence) when an English army marched to Irvine to engage the Scottish army, encamped at Knadgerhill; the English arrived only to find that dissension amongst the Scots leaders was so great that armed conflict would not occur, and many of the leaders would end up changing sides and joining King Edward I. Bourtreehill House, the only major Estate in the parish, was periodically possessed by all three kings, and possibly the Constables of Scotland before them.

In 1618, John Stewart (said to be a vagabond or juggler) and Margaret Barclay, wife of Archibald Dean (a burgess of Irvine), were tried for witchcraft. They were accused of sinking a ship called The Gift of God of Irvine belonging to John Dean, Barclay's brother-in-law. Margaret Barclay was alleged to have wished the crew would be eaten by crabs at the bottom of the sea. Stewart hanged himself, and Barclay was tortured, found guilty by her confession, and executed along with Isobel Scherer, herself accused of the same acts.

=== Trindlemoss Loch ===
Trindlemoss Loch, Scotts Loch, or the Loch of Irvine was situated in a low-lying area running from Ravenspark to near Stanecastle and down to Lockwards, now represented only by the playing fields off Bank Street. The loch was natural, sitting in a hollow created by glaciation. The loch waters were progressively drained and in 1691 this was finally achieved. The loch and its adjacent land was purchased by the Reverend Patrick Warner (minister in Irvine 1688–1702), who had sought refuge in the Netherlands after the Battle of Bothwell Bridge. It has been suggested that it was during this exile that he learned the skill of land reclamation.

=== Irvine Harbour ===
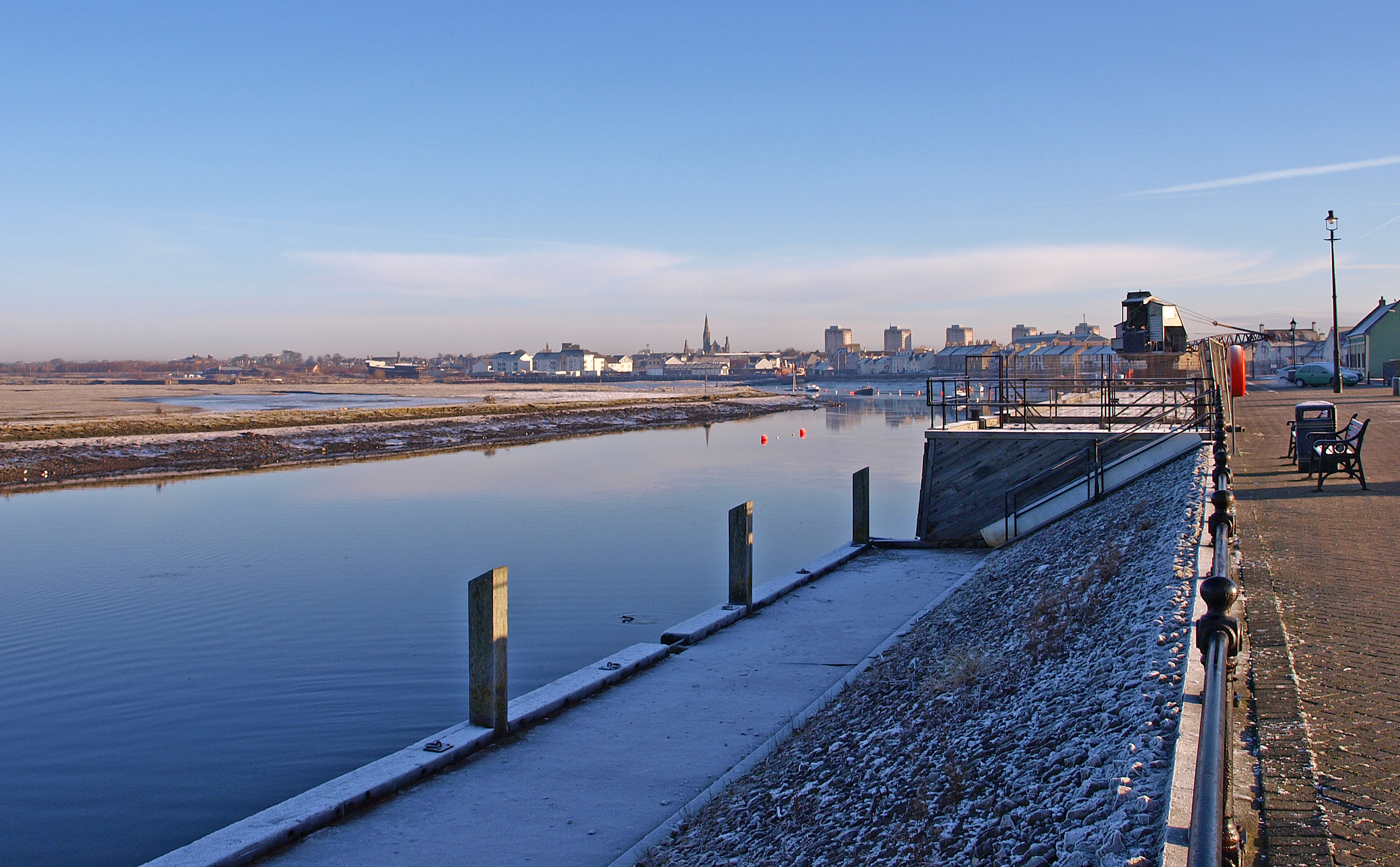
Irvine Harbour with the River Irvine running through it

The harbour for Irvine has a long history and once was one of the most prominent ports in Scotland after Glasgow. Across from the main harbour itself there was a terminal for the ICI-Nobel Explosives plant on the River Garnock. Much of the harbour went into decline in the 19th century when Glasgow, Greenock and Port Glasgow achieved higher prominence as sea ports. Despite this, there was still commercial sea traffic, though the harbour went into further decline in the 20th century. The main shipping in the 20th century was light coastal traffic and vessels destined for the Nobel Explosives facility. This facility had its own quay, which, although now disused, is still visible from Irvine Harbour. A shipyard on the River Irvine, the Ayrshire Dockyard Company, remained active until after World War II, though its last ship was built just prior to the war. Afterwards it was involved in refitting ships and also in the manufacture of fittings for other vessels including the Cunard liner Queen Elizabeth 2. Irvine Harbour is now officially closed as a commercial port and houses a small number of privately owned pleasure craft. It is also home to part of the Scottish Maritime Museum with numerous vessels on display, including the 'Spartan', one of the last surviving Clyde puffers.

Irvine Harbour is home to a unique and distinctive building which marked the tide level. It was built in 1906 and devised by Martin Boyd, the harbourmaster at that time. The Automatic tide signalling apparatus indicated the tide's state in two ways depending on the time of day. During daylight, the level was marked with a ball and pulley system attached to the mast. At night, a number of lamps marked the tidal level. Unfortunately the building fell into some disrepair and the mast partially dismantled. In 2013 an initiative by Coastwatch Scotland, a Voluntary Coastal Monitoring and Safety organisation, got underway in an attempt to turn the building into a watch tower for the benefit of the people of Irvine and visitors. In November 2016 the first stage was completed with an overall roof installed, new windows, a new door, the building re-painted and a radio aerial installed.

The harbour and surrounding area became an area heavily blighted by industrial waste even long after some of the industries were gone. There was a waste bing known by the locals as 'The Blue Billy' due to the colour of the waste there. During World War II a Royal Observer Corps watchtower was sited here giving a wide overall view of the Firth of Clyde. It is also credited with the first visual sighting of Rudolf Hess's Messerschmitt Bf 110 in 1941. The Annual Report of the Fishery Board for 1913 provides an insight into fishing from Irvine in the Firth of Clyde at that time. They caught herrings, mackerel, codlings and flounders.

Fishery Statistics

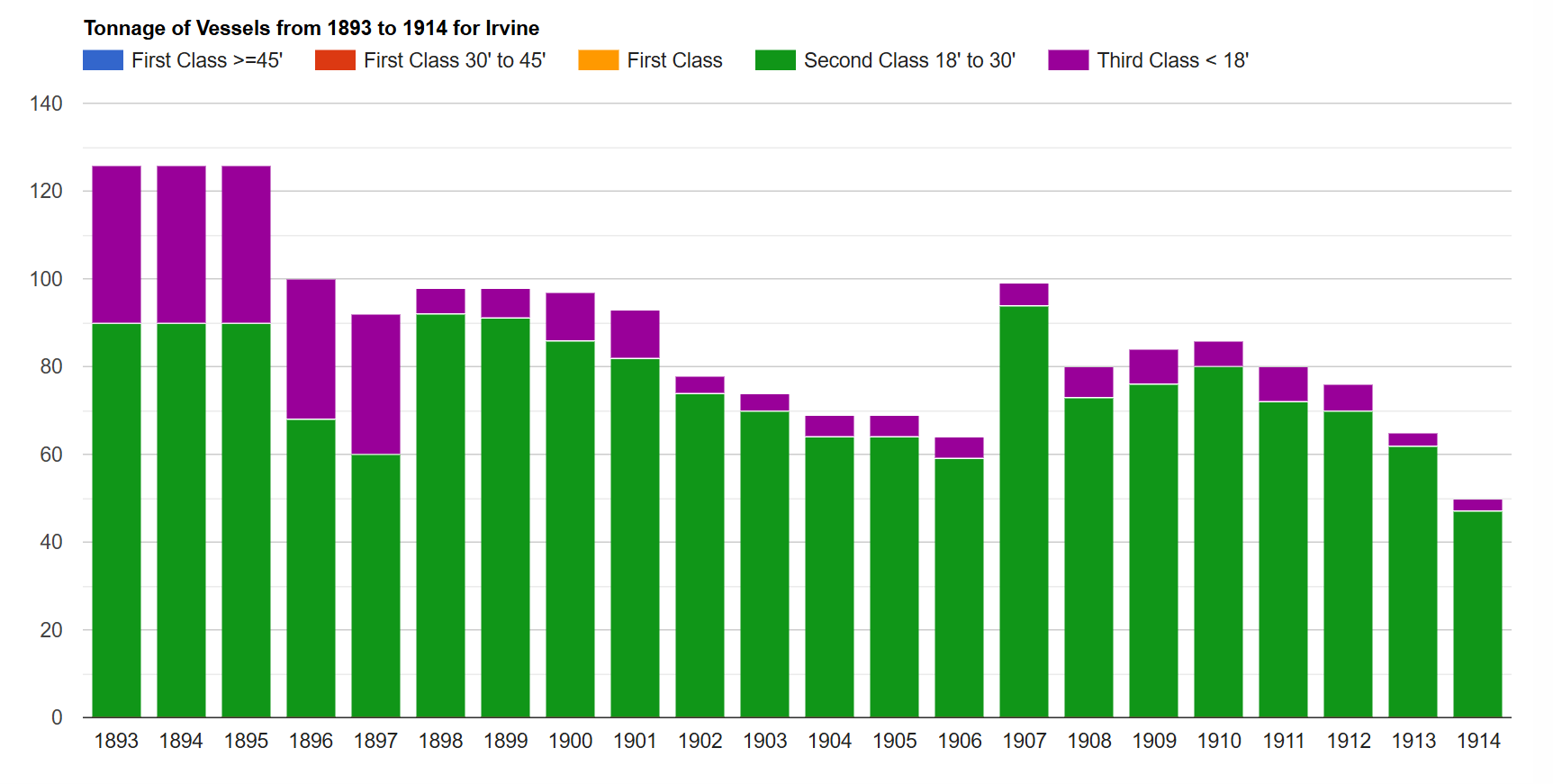
Tonnage of vessels

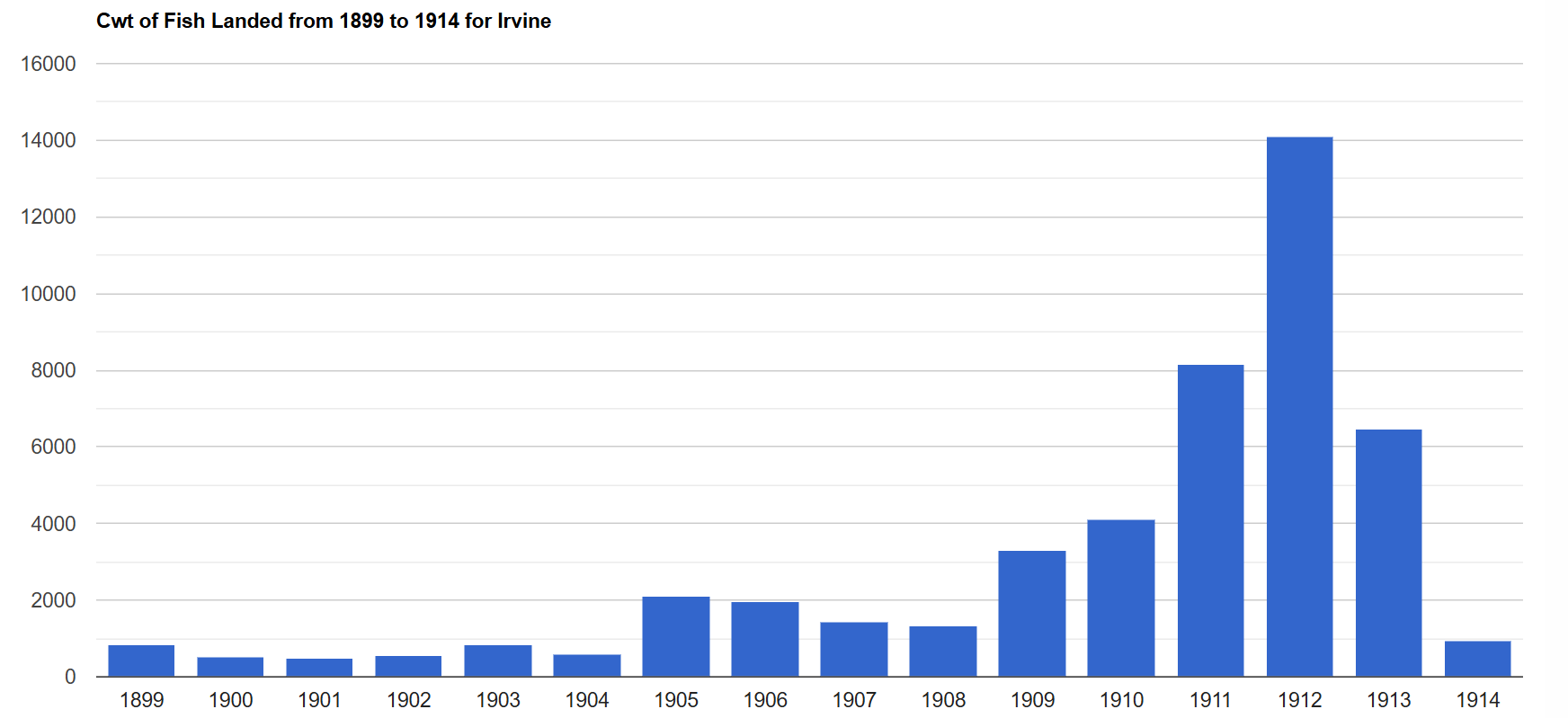
Cwt of fish landed (excluding shellfish)

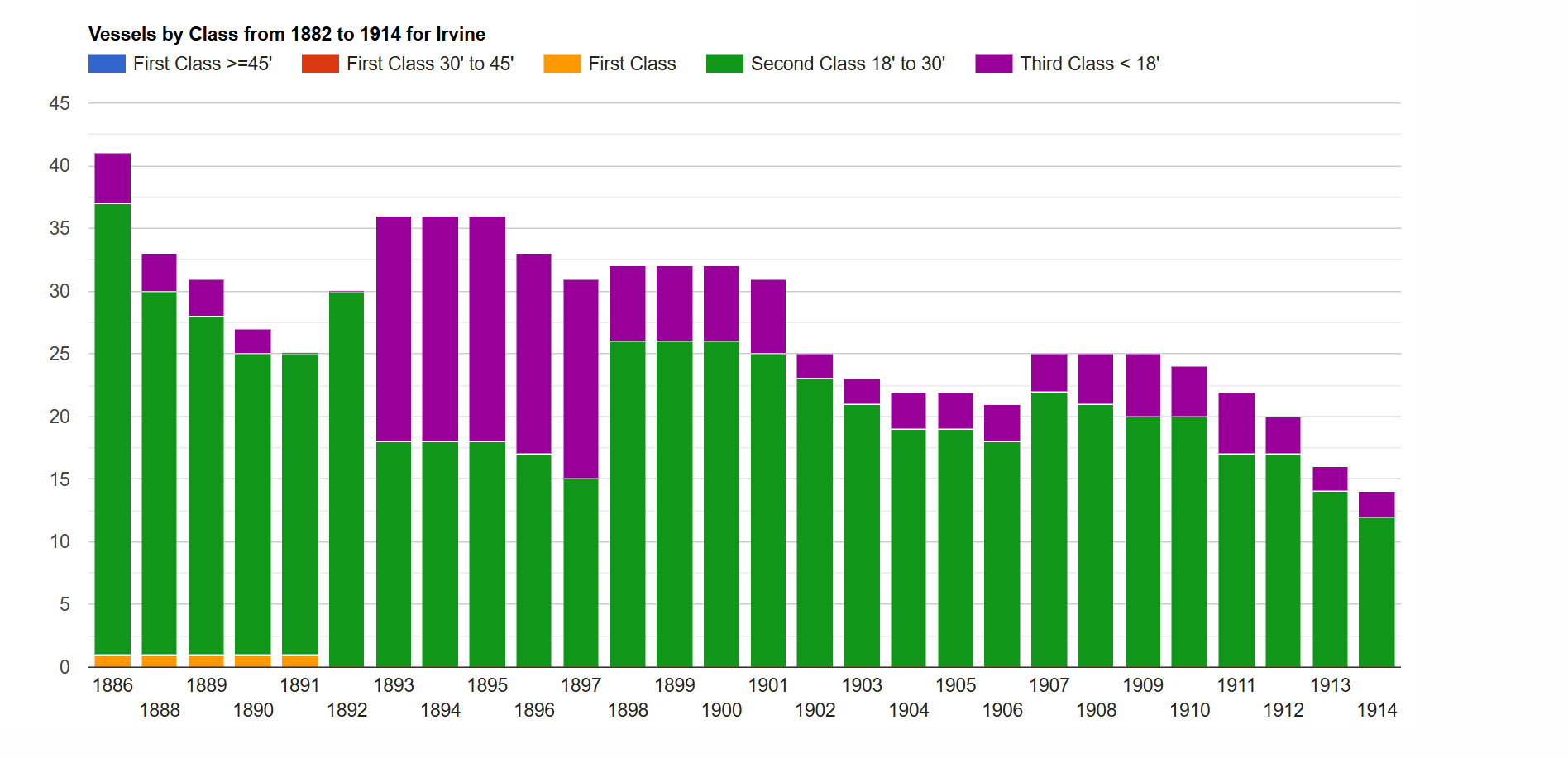
Vessels by class

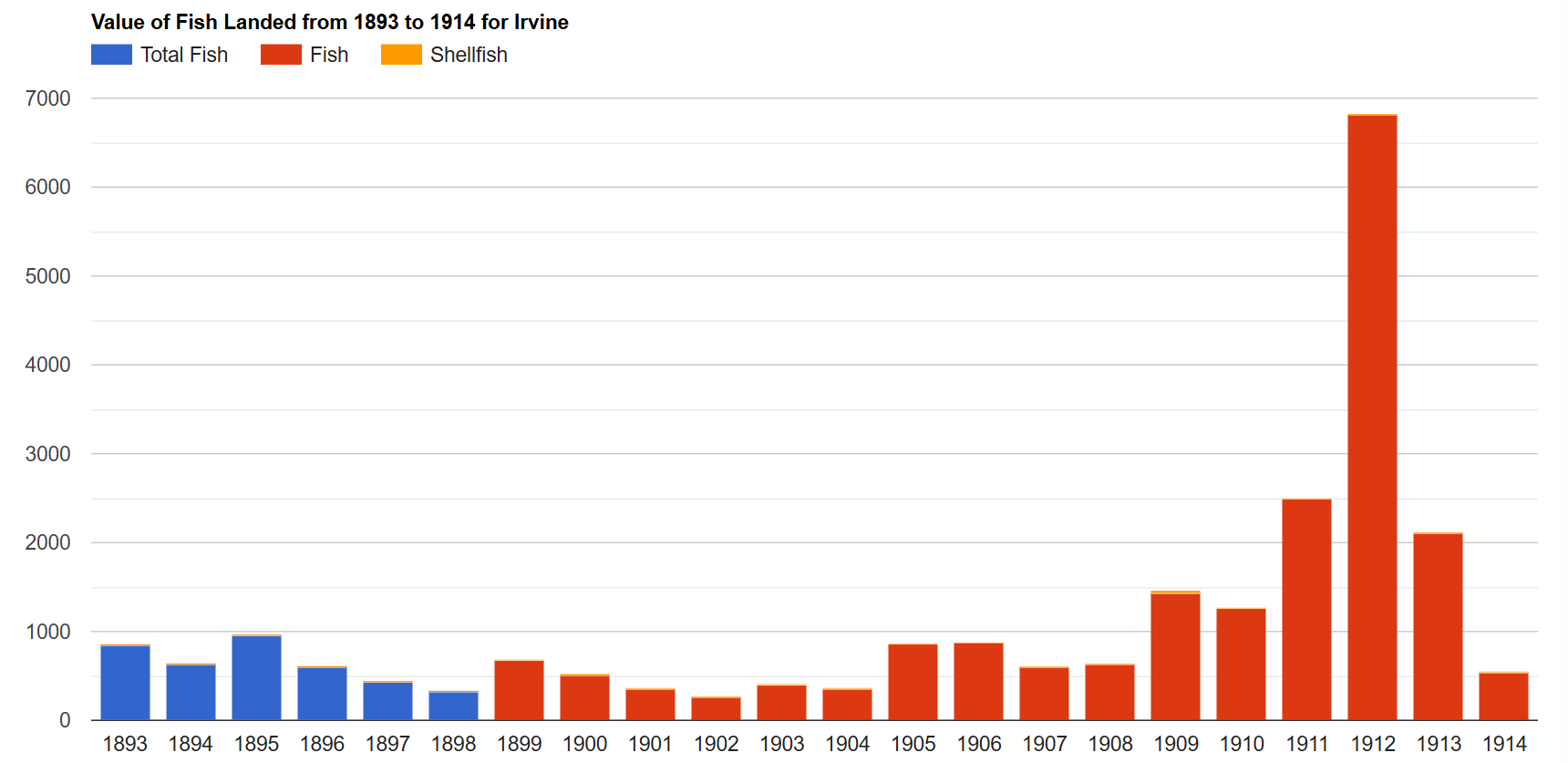
Value (£) of fish landed

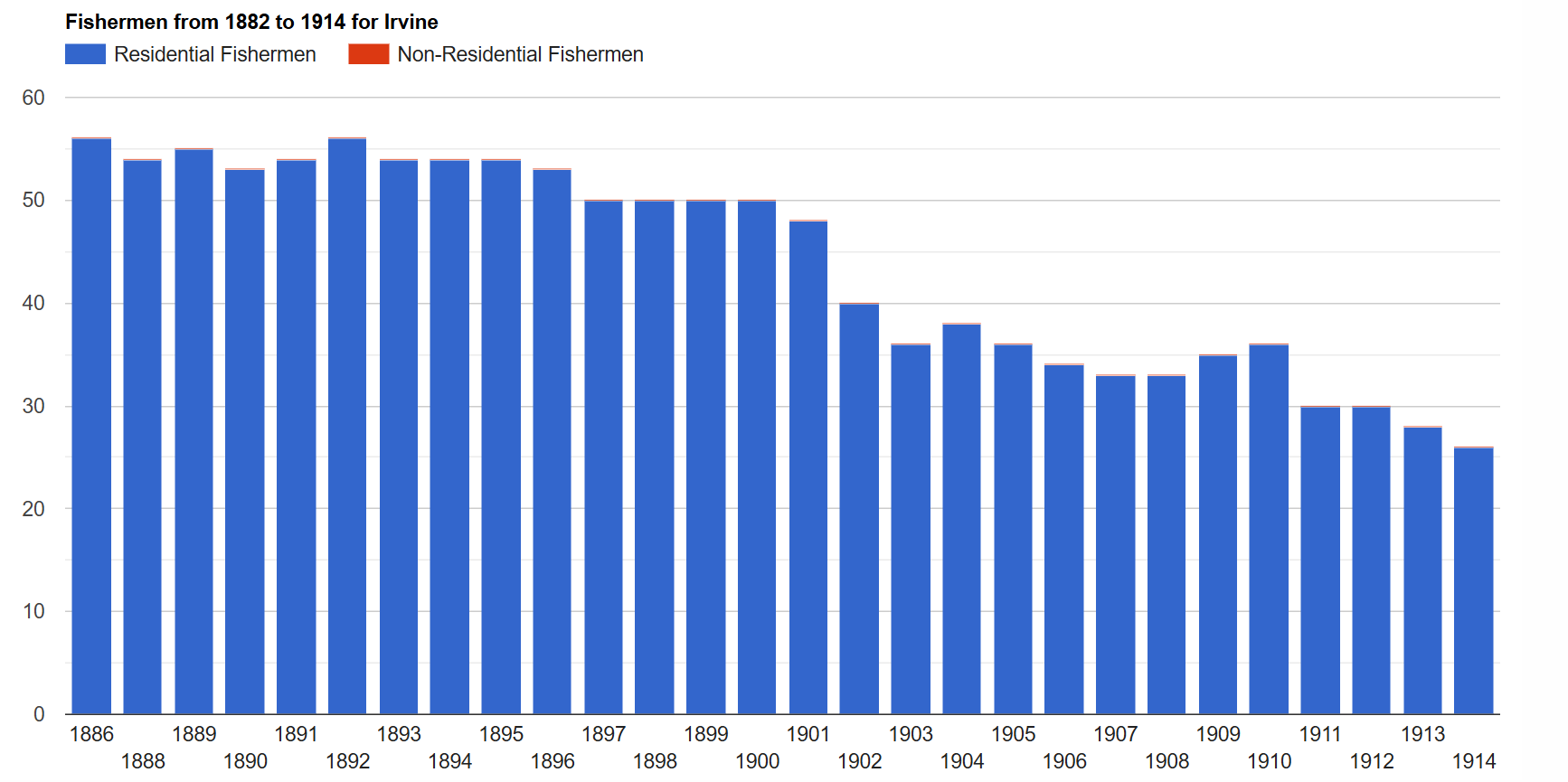
Fishermen

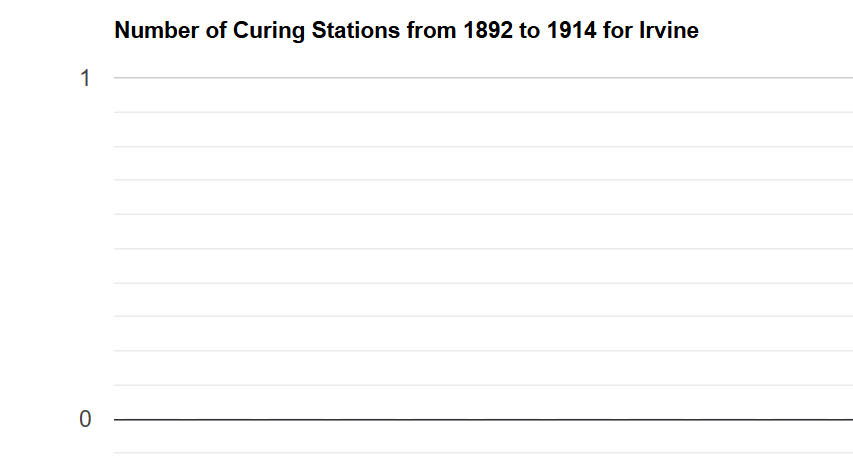
Placeholder - no curing stations

=== Modern history ===
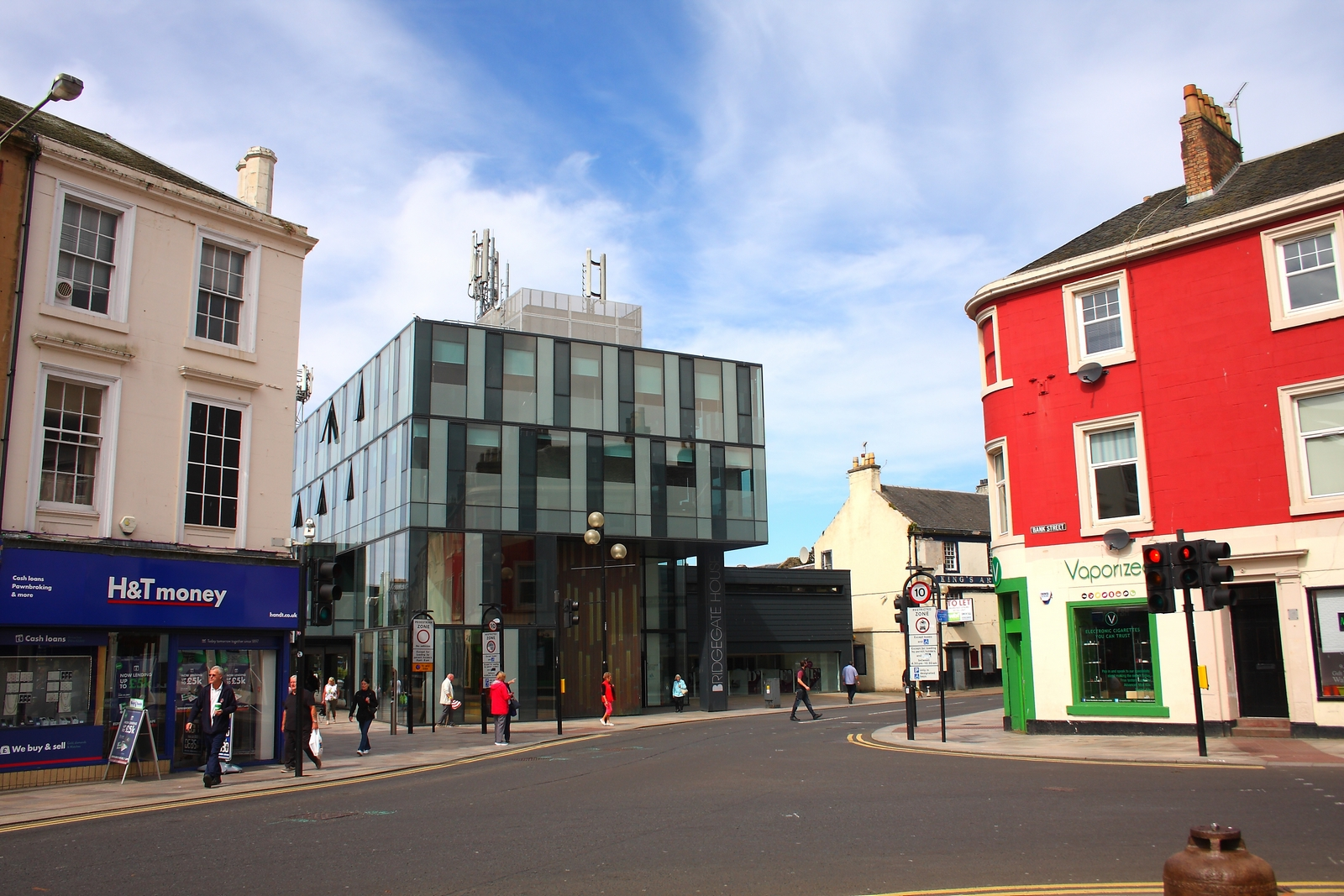
Bridgegate House (centre) at Irvine Cross, alongside older traditional buildings

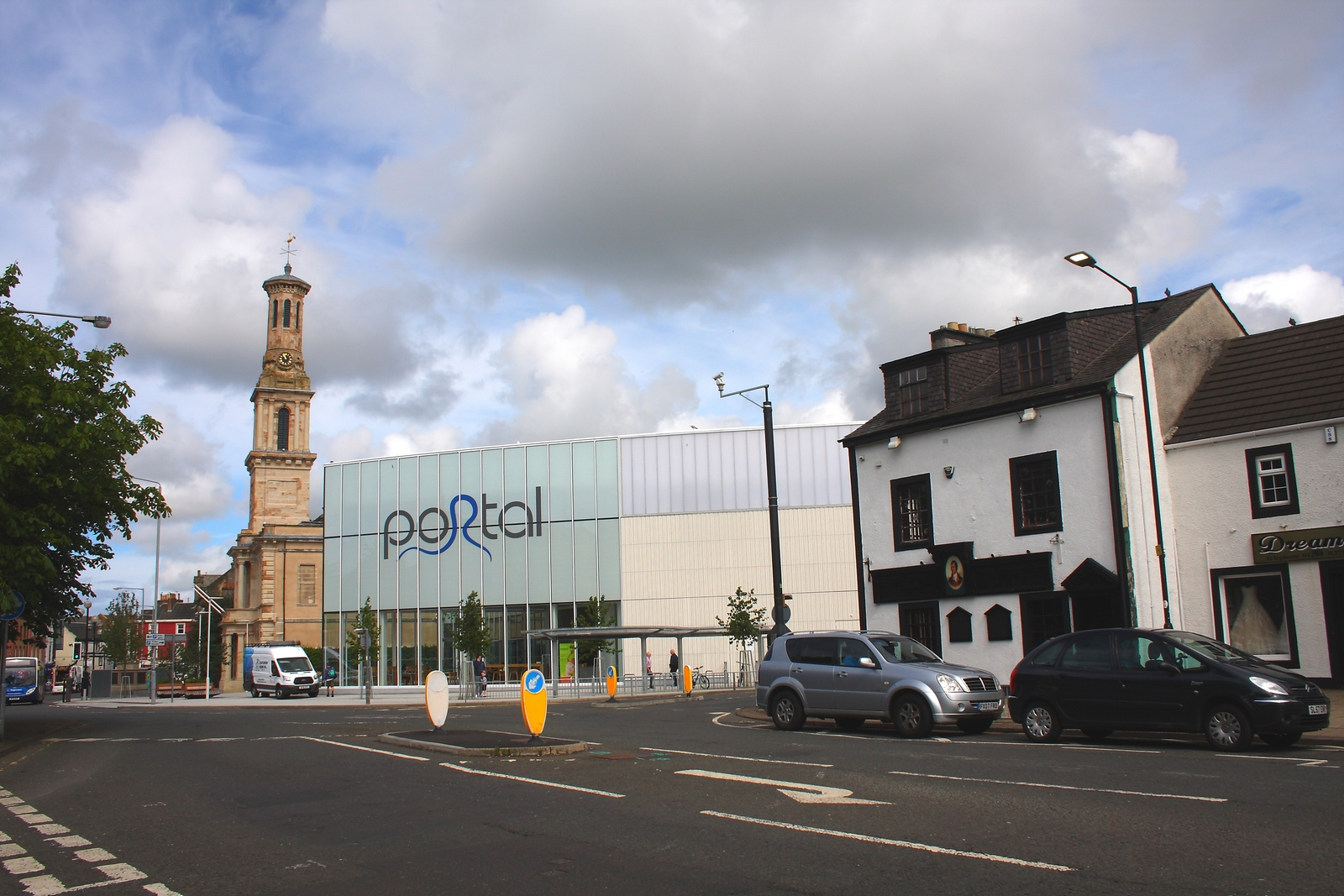
The Portal Leisure Centre replaced The Magnum

Irvine was officially designated, in 1966, the fifth and last new town to be developed in Scotland and the only one to be located on the coast. The other Scottish 'new towns' were East Kilbride, Glenrothes, Cumbernauld and Livingston. Unlike most new towns which were either completely newly built or based around small villages, Irvine was already a sizeable town which had been a Royal Burgh since 1372. A quango, the Irvine Development Corporation (IDC), was set up in the 1960s to oversee the development of Irvine as Scotland's fifth new town. The Corporation subsumed the planning powers of the Royal Burgh of Irvine Town Council, Kilwinning Town Council and the Irvine Landward District Council. This involved massive and sometimes controversial development of the old parts of the town.

In 1976, the Magnum Leisure Centre opened in the town, and at the time of its competition, was the largest leisure centre in Europe. Initially called Irvine Harbour Leisure Centre, it was constructed at a cost of £3.2 million, becoming one of the most popular leisure and entertainment centres in Ayrshire and nationally across Scotland, with an estimated 25,000 people attending the opening of the centre. It closed in 2016, and was replaced by The Portal in the town centre.

The provisions of The New Town (Irvine) Winding Up Order 1993 officially ended the New Town Designation on 31 December 1996. This marked the end of the Irvine Development Corporation and the return of full planning control of the area back to the local authority. The Irvine Bay Regeneration Company was set up in 2006, one of the second generation of Scottish URCs. Irvine is one of the five towns in the area, along with Ardrossan, Saltcoats, Stevenston and Kilwinning. Major development projects in the Irvine area include the redevelopment of Irvine Harbour, creating a residential area with the atmosphere of a Scottish village.

Planning for a new golf course with a hotel and holiday resort is also well under way in the Marine Drive area, and the Riverside Business Park will be revitalised to attract new business into the area. The Bridgegate renovation project was completed in 2017.

== Governance ==
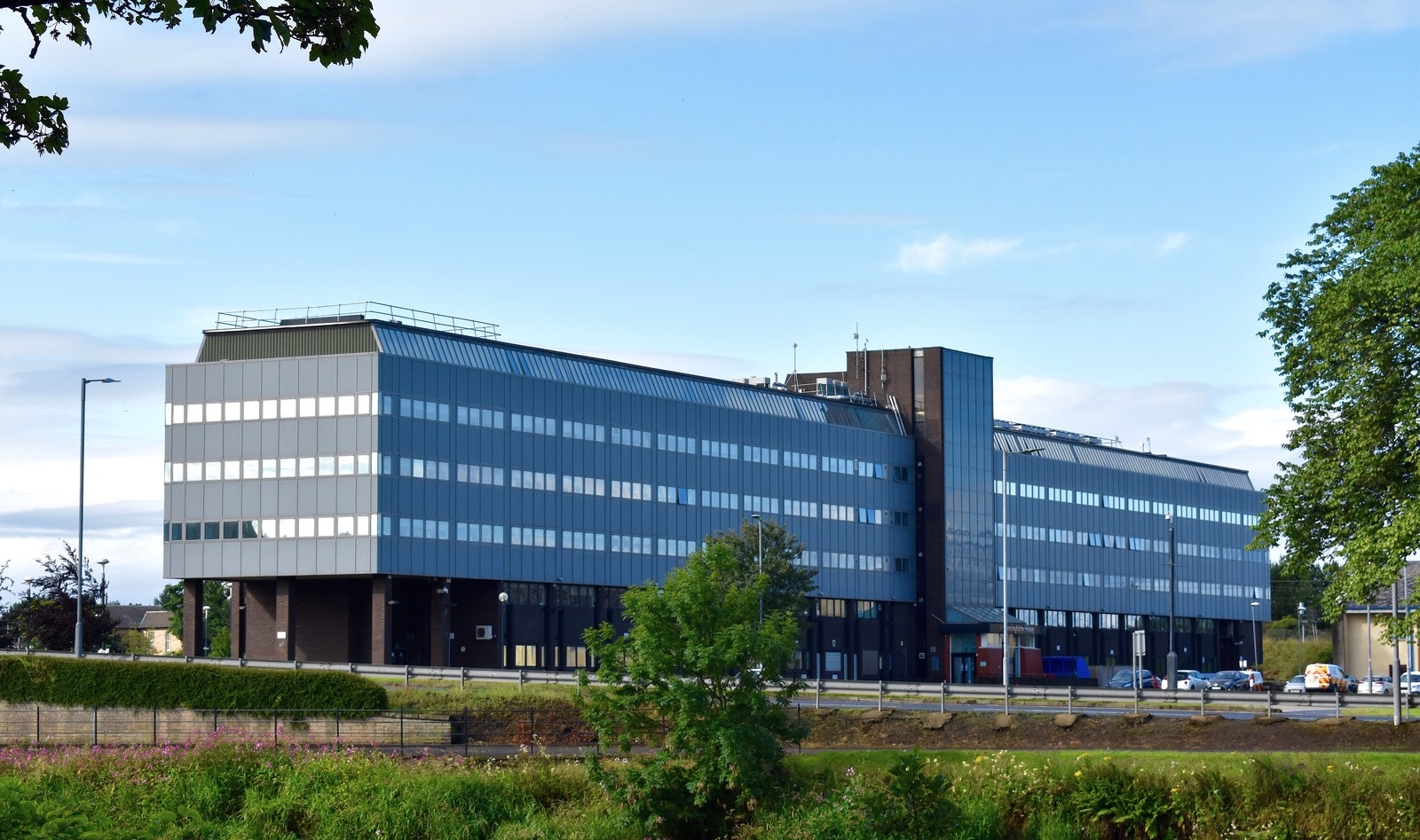
Cunninghame House, the seat of North Ayrshire Council, located in the centre of Irvine

Irvine was granted its first Burgh Charter around 1249. This entitled the town to organise its own affairs under a Town Council. In circa 1372 a dispute arose between Irvine and Ayr as to which of the two burghs had rights to control trade in the Barony of Cunninghame and Barony of Largs. The Burgesses of Irvine were able to produce Royal Charters showing that the town had the right to control trade in the Baronies of Cunninghame and Largs. The dispute was resolved by Robert II's Royal Charter of 8 April 1372 conferring Royal Burgh status.

Originally Fullarton remained outwith the Royal Burgh of Irvine as a distinct village and latterly burgh in its own right in the Parish of Dundonald until the Irvine Burgh Act 1881 extended the town's boundaries.

Irvine continued to administer itself with the usual Royal Burgh administrative arrangements of Provost, Bailies and Burgesses, who were based at Irvine Townhouse. Responsibility for public health, schools and strategic services such as roads passed to Ayr County Council in 1930 when the town was re-classified as a Small Burgh. On 16 May 1975 the Royal Burgh of Irvine Town Council was abolished and its functions were transferred to the now defunct Cunninghame District Council and Strathclyde Regional Council before being transferred from 1 April 1996 onwards to North Ayrshire Council. The bulk of the Royal Burgh records have been made available to the public in Irvine Townhouse.

There is a Community council in Irvine. However, unlike counterparts elsewhere in Scotland, it opts not to use 'Royal Burgh of' in its title. The motto used on the coat of arms of the Royal Burgh is 'Tandem Bona Causa Triumphat.' This means "The Good Cause Triumphs in the end". The Westminster Constituency of Central Ayrshire is currently held by Scottish Labour. The Member of Parliament (MP) is Alan Gemmell. The Scottish Parliament Constituency of Cunninghame South is also held by the Scottish National Party. The Member of the Scottish Parliament (MSP) is Ruth Maguire.

At the 2014 Scottish independence referendum Irvine went against the national trend where 28 out of 32 council areas voted against the proposal for Scotland to become an independent state on a margin of 55.3% No to 44.7% Yes. In the Irvine West electoral ward 6,543 votes were cast in favour of independence compared with 6,397 votes cast against the proposal, with a vote share of 50.56% "Yes" to 49.44% "No". In Irvine East there were 7,111 "Yes" votes and 6,811 "No" votes, on a vote share of 51.08% Yes to 48.92% No. For Irvine as a whole there were 13,654 "Yes" votes and 13,208 "No" votes, breaking down to 50.83% Yes to 49.17% No.

== Geography and climate ==
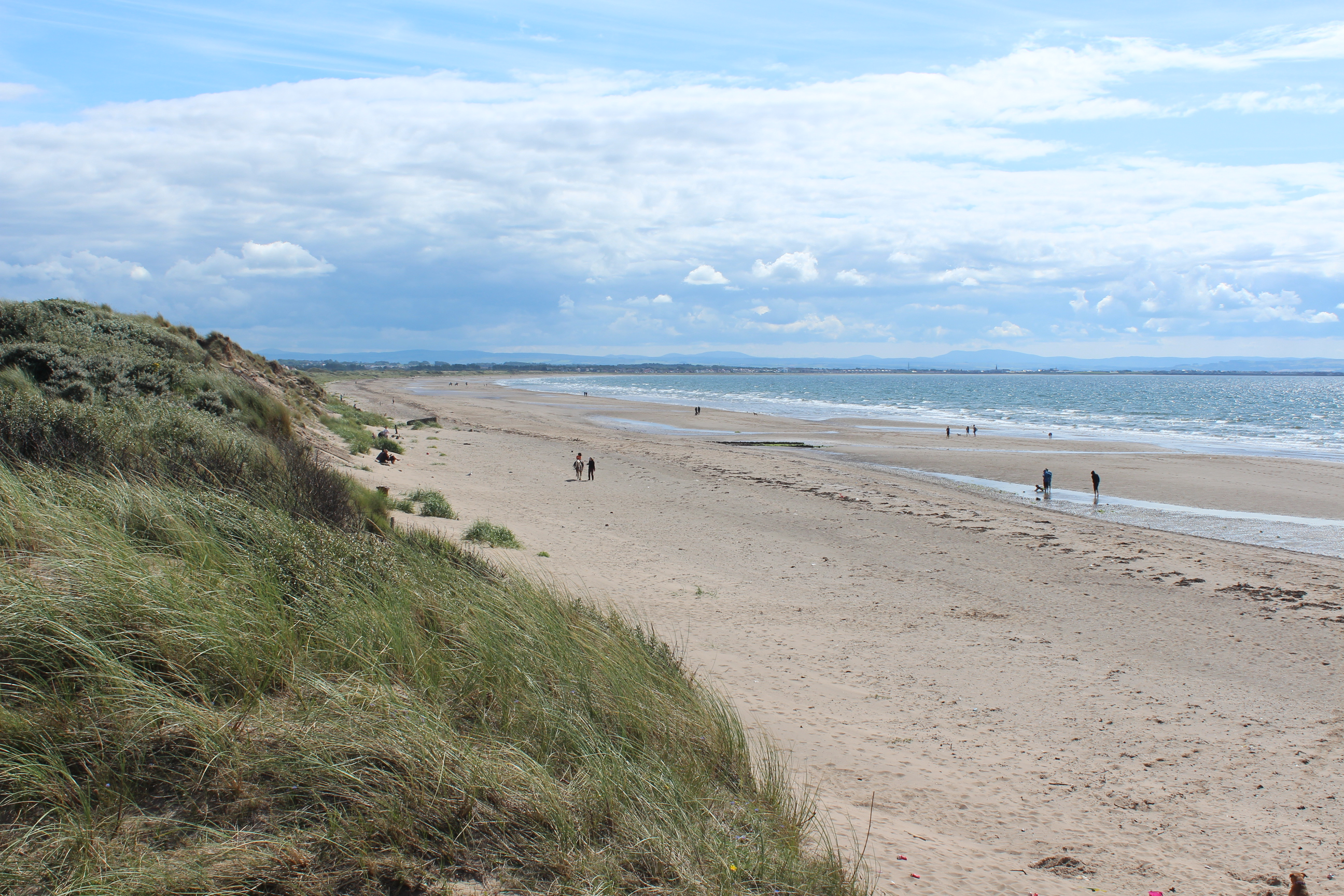
Irvine Beach. The town is located on the Firth of Clyde

Irvine is situated in low lying Ayrshire overlooking Irvine Bay on the Firth of Clyde. It is a coastal town and lies approximately 25 miles (40 km) southwest of Glasgow. Most of the land in and around Irvine is very flat. Two rivers flow through the area, one being the River Irvine and the other being the Annick Water. The Annick Water is very popular for fishing.

The area experiences relatively cool, wet summers and cold, wet winters, although snow in the area is not uncommon. Part of the reason why this part of Scotland is particularly mild is the influence from the sea air, with summer temperatures lower than their continental counterparts and only slightly warmer than their continental counterparts during the winter. Generally, rainfall is plentiful throughout the year due to Atlantic weather systems sweeping in from the west. Snow is not rare in this part of Scotland and in many cases brings the area to a halt, like in 1995 and winter 2009/10.

Surrounding villages and hamlets around the vicinity of Irvine include Bourtreehill, Bourtreehill House, Lands of Broomlands, Cleeves Cove, Dreghorn, Drukken Steps, Eglinton Country Park, Girdle Toll, Irvine Harbour, Irvine New Town Trail, Laigh Milton Viaduct, Springside, Towerlands, The Chapel Well and Tanzie Well.

== Transport ==
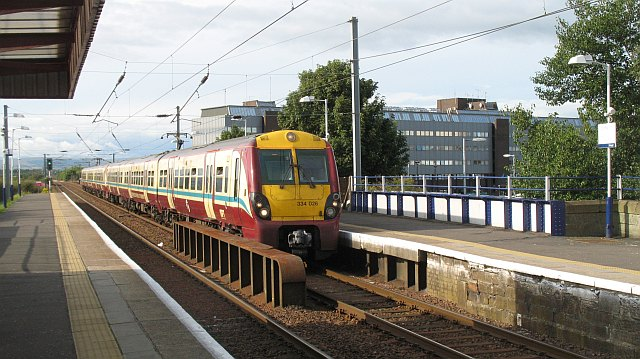
A train approaching Irvine railway station

Irvine is well served with numerous transport links. A railway station, originally built by the Glasgow and South Western Railway Company, is situated at the west end of the town which is on the main line between Stranraer and Glasgow. The railway company responsible for local routes is ScotRail who operate Saltire liveried Diesel and Electric Multiple units of the former Strathclyde Passenger Transport Executive.

A comprehensive local bus network, coupled with frequent services to Ardrossan, Largs, Kilmarnock, Ayr, Troon and Glasgow, is provided by Stagecoach South Scotland.

There are two primary road crossings over the River Irvine, the more southerly of which has been criticised for some years. It is situated on the site of the former Irvine to Kilmarnock railway link which has long since been closed. The bridge over the river there has long been unsuitable for heavy traffic – being of a Bailey bridge design – which was constantly repaired over the years it existed. North Ayrshire Council announced plans to renew the bridge in a £2m investment which started in 2007, and was completed in 2010.

Irvine is also well served by several arterial roads, namely the A78 (Greenock to Prestwick), A71 (Irvine to Kilmarnock and beyond to Edinburgh), A737 (through the Garnock Valley to Glasgow via the M8) and the A736 to Glasgow.

== Culture ==
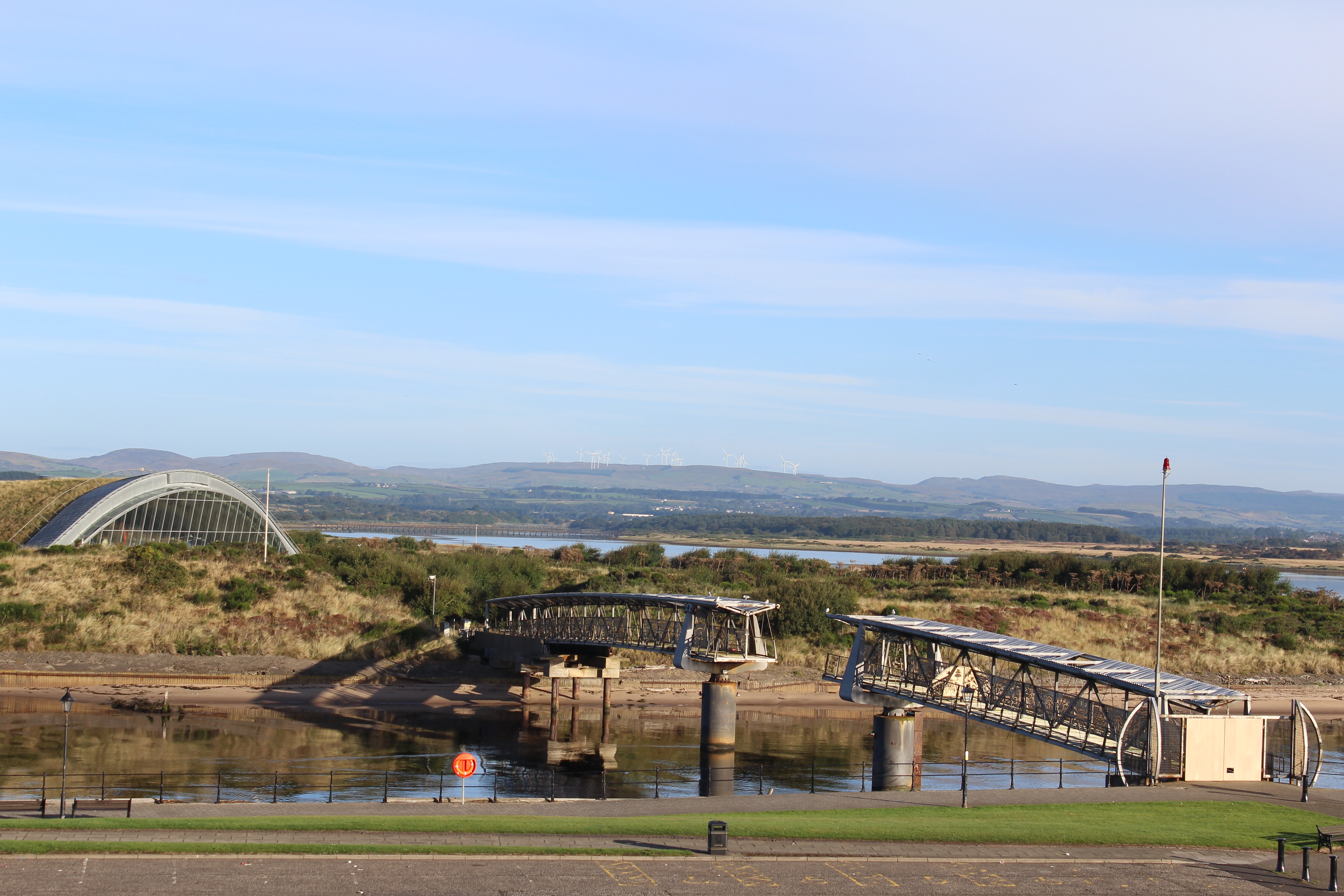
The Big Idea opened as part of Millennium celebrations in 2000, and closed in 2003

As part of the Millennium celebrations, an exhibition known as The Big Idea opened in 2000. It was constructed on the north side of the River Irvine near the former Nobel quay. A footbridge from the harbour area was constructed, although it had to be able to open and close to still allow the small pleasure craft to pass. The Big Idea closed in 2003, due to low visitor numbers.

North Ayrshire's theatre and arts centre was built here in 1966, and plays hosts to touring drama, live music and exhibitions. The hulk of the historic clipper ship, City of Adelaide, was moved to a dry dock near the inner harbour in 1992. There were various proposals for preserving the ship, and in March 2012 preparations were under way to move the ship to Adelaide, South Australia, for conservation and display. On 18 September 2013, the City of Adelaide started its final journey to Adelaide, South Australia.

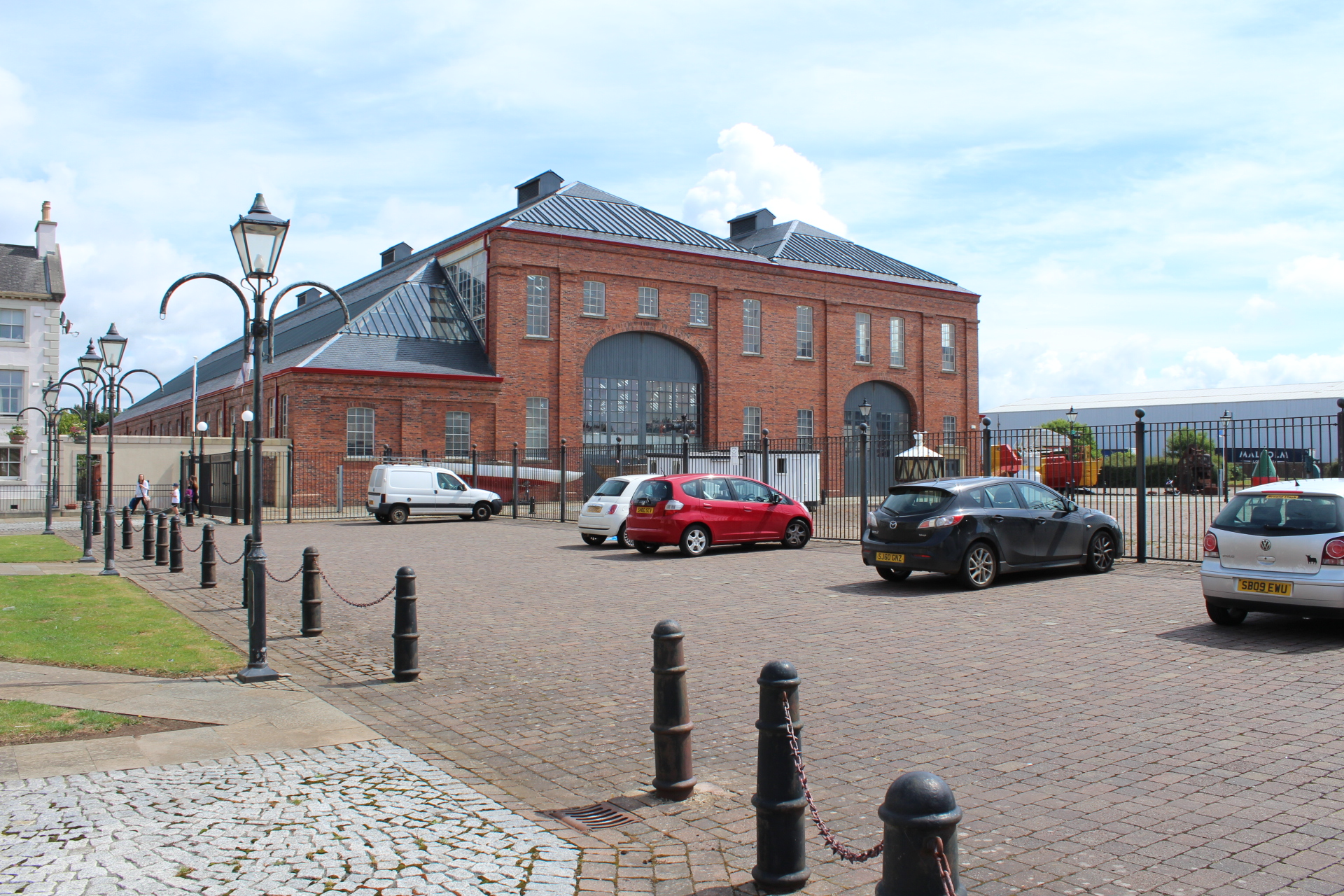
Irvine is home to the Scottish Maritime Museum

Irvine is home to two football teams: Irvine Victoria and Irvine Meadow. The local rugby union team is Irvine RFC. The town used to have two greyhound racing tracks: the Townhead Greyhound Track, closed in 1967 and the Irvine Caledonian Stadium, closed in 1993. The horse racing Bogside Racecourse was closed in 1965.

The Irvine New Town Trail passes through a lot of the surrounding areas of Irvine; it forms part of the British National Cycle Network with routes 7 and 73 forming part of the route. The route forms a ring around the town and passes through Kilwinning, Bourtreehill, Girdle Toll and Dreghorn and passes through the town centre of Irvine.

As a farmer, Robert Burns grew flax, and during 1781 he took work as a flax-dresser in a heckling shop. He lodged in the adjacent vennel (or lane) which led towards Glasgow, used a bookshop in the town, and was encouraged by others to work towards publishing his poetry.

The Irvine Burns Club, originally formed in the Milne's Inn (now The Crown Inn) is now based in Wellwood House, Eglinton Street, and has an unbroken history dating back to 2 June 1826.

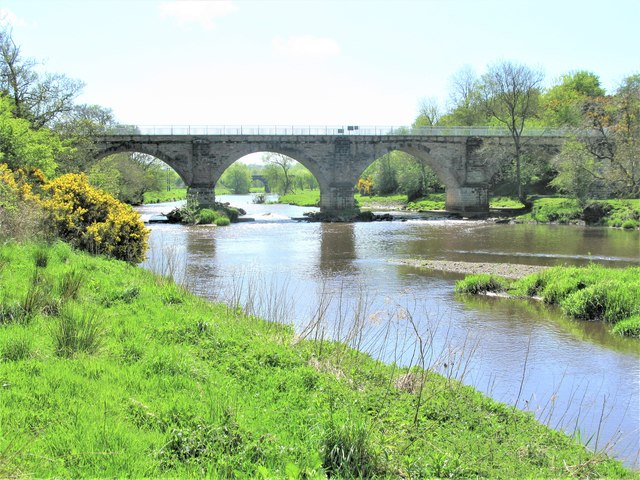
Laigh Milton Viaduct near Gatehead, Ayrshire, the oldest railway viaduct in Scotland

The club had twelve founding members of whom five were known to Robert Burns, and two were once his close friends. The original minute of the meeting reads "The subscribers agree hereby to form, and do now form ourselves into a Committee for the purpose of establishing a Club, or Society for Commemorating the birth of Robert Burns the Ayrshire Poet – and we agree to meet at an early day to get the preliminaries of the Club properly arranged". Dr John Mackenzie, was the first club president. He had been a doctor in Mauchline, attended Burns' dying father at Lochlea in 1784 and married one of the "Mauchline Belles" before moving to Irvine in the capacity of personal physician to the Earl of Eglinton and his family. David Sillar, the first vice-president, had been a friend of Burns since his teenage years, was a member of the Tarbolton Bachelors Club, became a grocer, and finally an Irvine Council Bailie.

The Irvine Burns Club is one of the oldest continually existing Burns Clubs in the World and has an excellent collection of Burns artifacts, including the Kilmarnock Edition and Edinburgh editions of "Poems chiefly in the Scottish dialect", by Robert Burns. The club has six of the original manuscripts which Burns sent to John Wilson, printer, Kilmarnock, for his famous Kilmarnock Edition, published on 31 July 1786, namely – The Twa Dogs, The Author's Earnest Cry and Prayer, The Address to the Deil, Scotch Drink and The Cottar's Saturday Night. The Irvine Burns Club has the oldest continuous record of any Burns club in the World.

== Notable people ==
See Category:People from Irvine, North Ayrshire

=== Sport ===
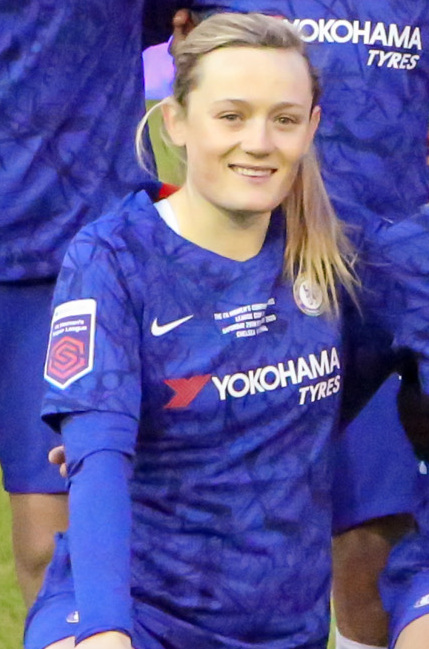
- Erin Cuthbert
  Lucas Blakeley (born 2001), racing driver and esports player
- Kris Boyd (born 1983), footballer
- Joanne Calderwood (born 1985), Scottish mixed martial artist, born in Irvine.
- Robbie Crawford (born 1993), football player for Charleston Battery
- Erin Cuthbert (born 1998), Champions League goal of the season winner and Chelsea football player
- Kris Doolan (born 1986), footballer. Former captain and record goal scorer for Partick Thistle
- Billy Gilmour (born 2001), footballer for Napoli and the Scotland national football team was born in Irvine
- Marty Hay (born 1976), former cricketer
- John Keirs (1947–1995), Scottish professional footballer
- Steven Naismith (born 1986), former footballer with Kilmarnock, Rangers, Everton and Norwich City
- Graeme Obree (born 1965), racing cyclist and former world hour record-holder, lives near Irvine.
- twins Donna Robertson & Fiona Robertson (born 1969), judoka and wrestler
- Terry Taylor (born 2001), Welsh professional footballer for Burton Albion
- Donald Wilkinson (born 1955), former cricketer and educator
- Andrew Wilson (1879–1945), international footballer, scored 199 goals in 501 appearances for Sheffield Wednesday, born and died in Irvine.

=== Literature and arts ===
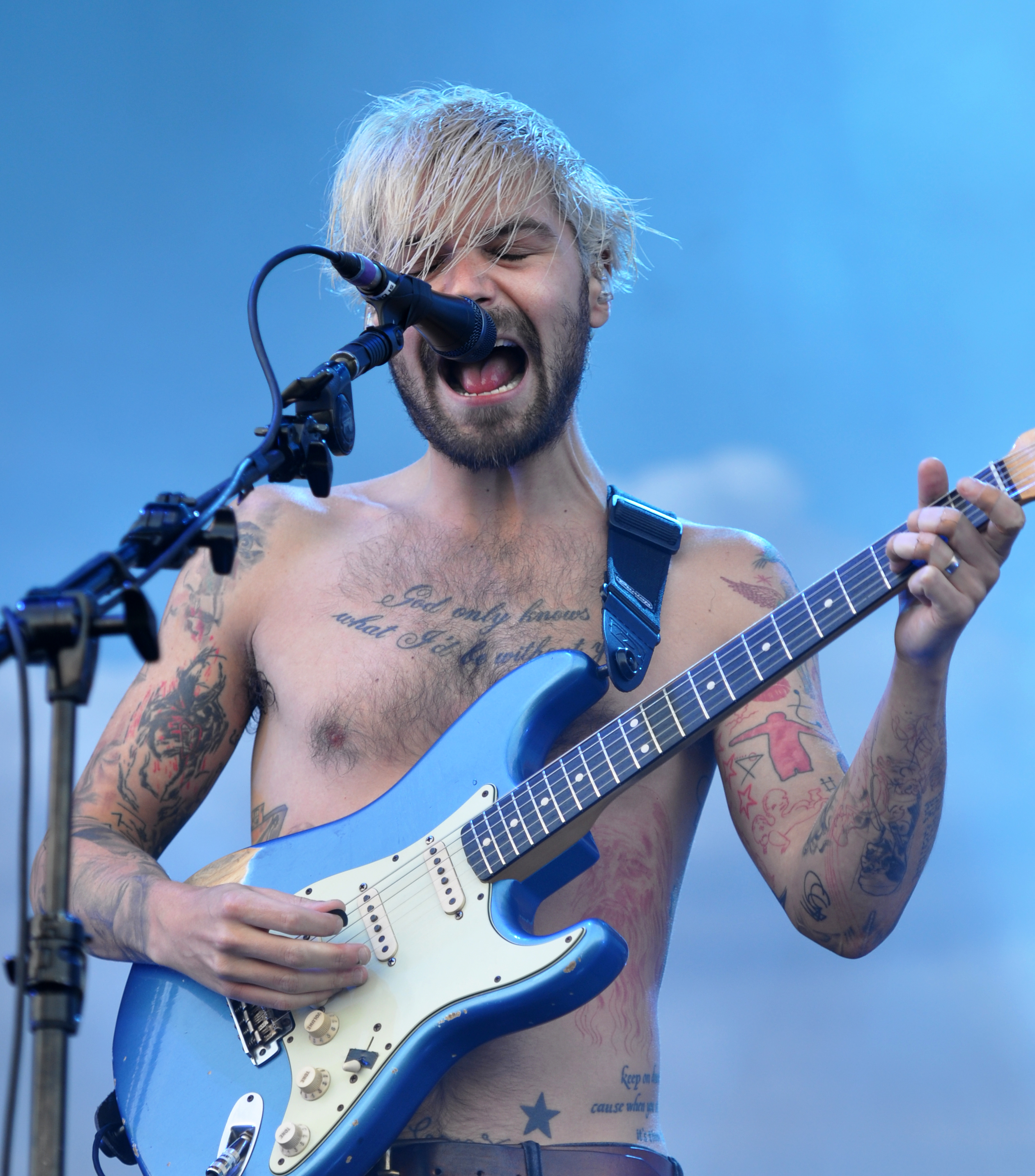
Simon Neil, lead singer of Biffy Clyro was born in Irvine

- Robert Burns (1759–1796), lived in Glasgow Vennel for nine months in 1781–1782 and worked as flax-dresser in a heckling shop.
- Janice Galloway (born 1955), writer and former resident of the town.
- John Galt (1779–1839), novelist.
- Julie Graham (born 1965), actress
- George Henry (1858–1943), prominent painter of the Glasgow School
- Joan Kelly (1828–1898), published her "Miscellaneous Poems" in 1848.
- James Montgomery (1771–1854), hymn writer, poet and editor.
- Simon Neil (born 1979), lead singer of Biffy Clyro
- Agnes Miller Parker (1895–1980), vorticist inspired artist
- Edgar Allan Poe (1809–1849), writer, attended the Old Grammar School in the school's last year (1815–16).
- Eddi Reader, (born 1959), singer-songwriter; lived briefly in Irvine when her family relocated in 1976
- Keith Salmon (born 1959), painter; he has lived in Irvine since 1998.
- Roddy Woomble (born 1976), lead singer of Idlewild, born in Irvine.

=== Public service ===
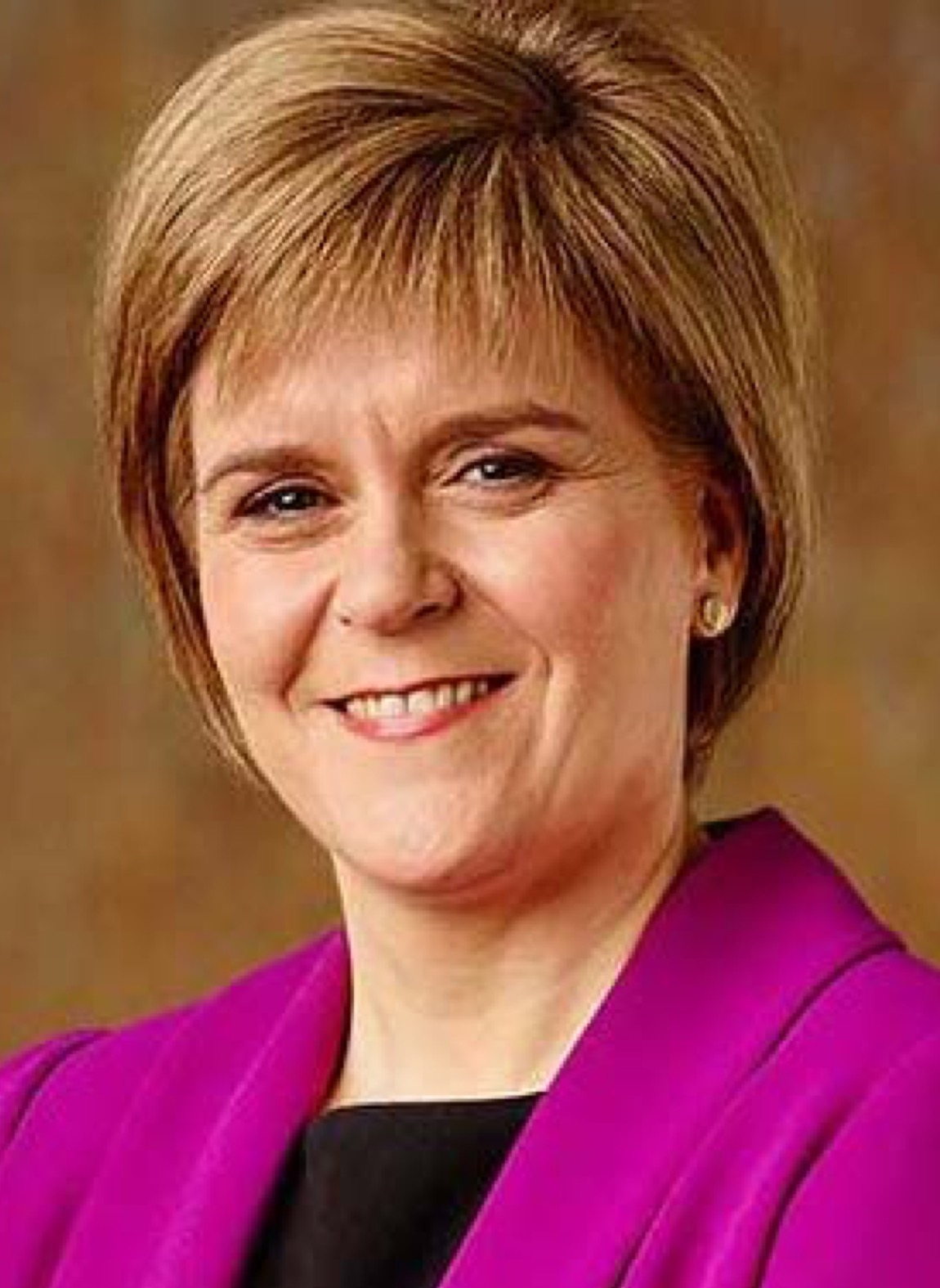
Nicola Sturgeon, former First Minister of Scotland, was born in Irvine and raised in nearby Dreghorn

- David Boyle, Lord Boyle (1772–1853), a British judge.
- John Ferguson (1787–1856), businessman and philanthropist.
- Reverend Lorna Hood (born 1953), Moderator of the General Assembly of the Church of Scotland 2013–14
- James MacKnight (1721-1800), minister and theological author.
- Fiona Hyslop (born 1964), the incumbent Cabinet Secretary for Transport in the Scottish Government
- Jack McConnell (born 1960), former First Minister of Scotland and former leader of the Scottish Labour Party
- Mary, Queen of Scots (1542–1587), is known to have slept at Eglinton Castle in Kilwinning and legend says she stopped at Seagate Castle on her journey the next day. A stone, believed to commemorate the visit, has been found in Irvine. It is inscribed MQ 1560.
- Agnes and Margaret Smith (1843–1926) & (1843–1920), twin sisters born in Irvine, discovered of one of the earliest biblical manuscripts, the Sinaitic palimpsest in 1892
- John Strang (1584–1654), minister and Principal of the University of Glasgow.
- Nicola Sturgeon (born 1970), the former First Minister of Scotland and former leader of the Scottish National Party.
- Ross Tollerton (1890–1931), awarded the Victoria Cross for his actions at the First Battle of the Aisne in 1914.
- William Wallace (ca.1270–1305), a Scottish knight, fought and enjoyed fishing in the River Irvine. Most of his early exploits are firmly placed in the Irvine Valley. He was possibly present at the Capitulation of Irvine.
- John Gray Wilson (1915-1968), lawyer, Sheriff, writer and politician

=== Others ===
- Sandy Davidson (born 1972), a three-year-old child who disappeared after running out of his back garden on the Bourtreehill housing estate and has not been seen since.
- James George Semple Lisle (1759–1815), an adventurer and confidence trickster.
- Sir David Paulin (1847–1930), banker and actuary, the first person within the insurance industry to be knighted

== Twin towns ==
Irvine is twinned with:

- Voisins-le-Bretonneux, Yvelines, France

== See also ==
- Irvine Beat FM
- Jean Gardner
