= Boyd's Automatic tide signalling apparatus =

Architectural structure in North Ayrshire, Scotland

Boyd's Automatic Tide Signalling Apparatus
- Irvine, North Ayrshire, Scotland; UK
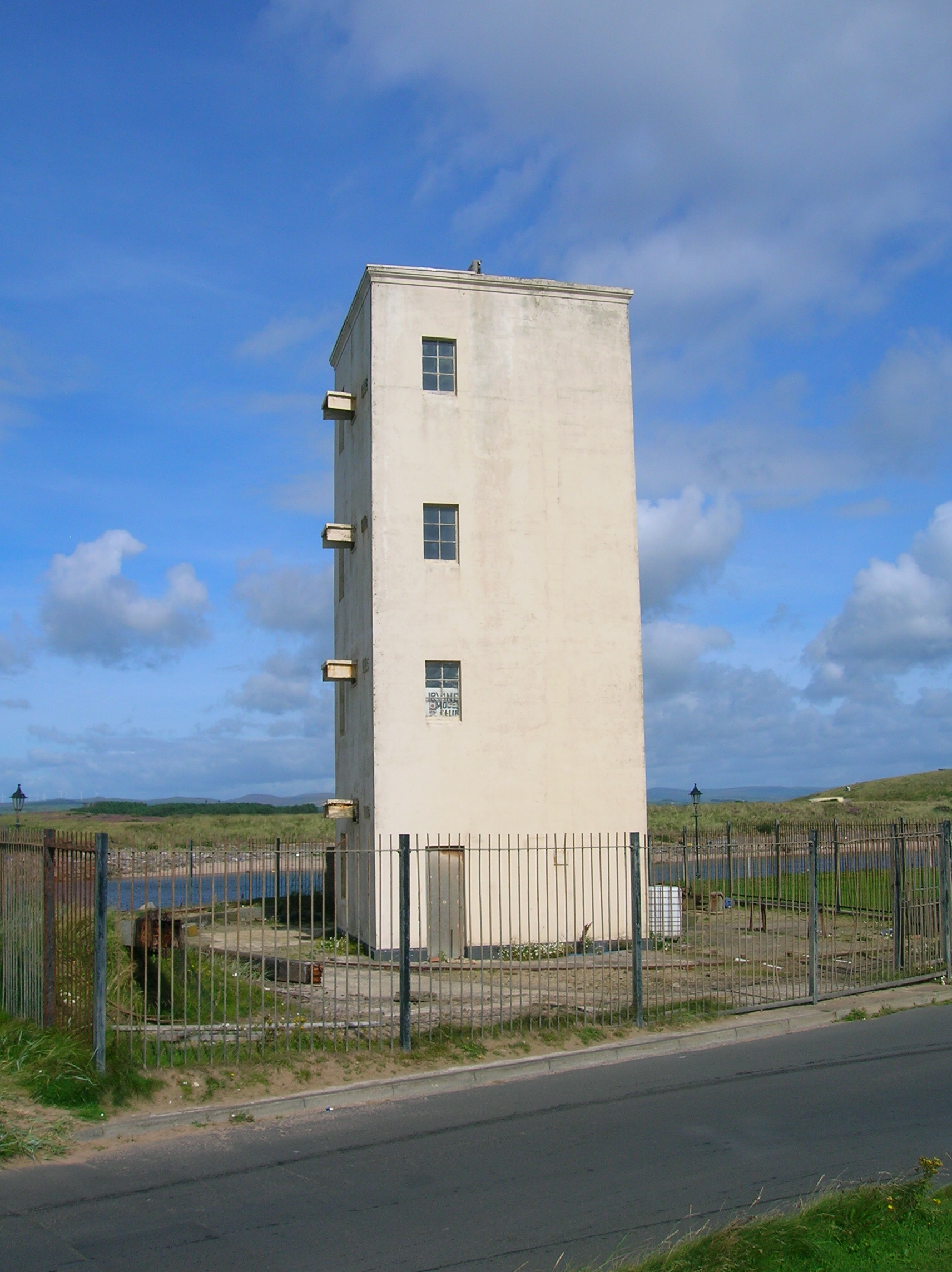
- The Boyd Automatic Tide Signalling Apparatus

Site information
- Owner: North Ayrshire Council
- Controlled by: Port of Irvine
- Open to the public: No
- Condition: Mast removed

Location
- Shown within Scotland
- Coordinates: 55.605778°N 4.694139°W
- Height: 50 foot tower, mast above

Site history
- Built: 1906
- Built by: Martin Boyd
- In use: Until the 1970s
- Materials: Harled brick

The automatic tide signalling apparatus or Pilot House at Irvine harbour in North Ayrshire, Scotland, is a category B listed building, and is probably unique, having been invented and patented by Martin Boyd, the Irvine harbourmaster, in 1905 and opened in 1906.

== Introduction ==
The Port of Irvine is situated on the Clyde Coast, sited next to the River Irvine and dates, in its present location, from circa 1677, although a military report describes a port in 1566 and by inference one was present in 1514 when the Aldermen and Bailies of Irvine were ordered by the Crown to make ships and crews available for a military expedition against Donald of the Isles.

== Irvine Harbour ==
=== Silting of the estuary mouth ===
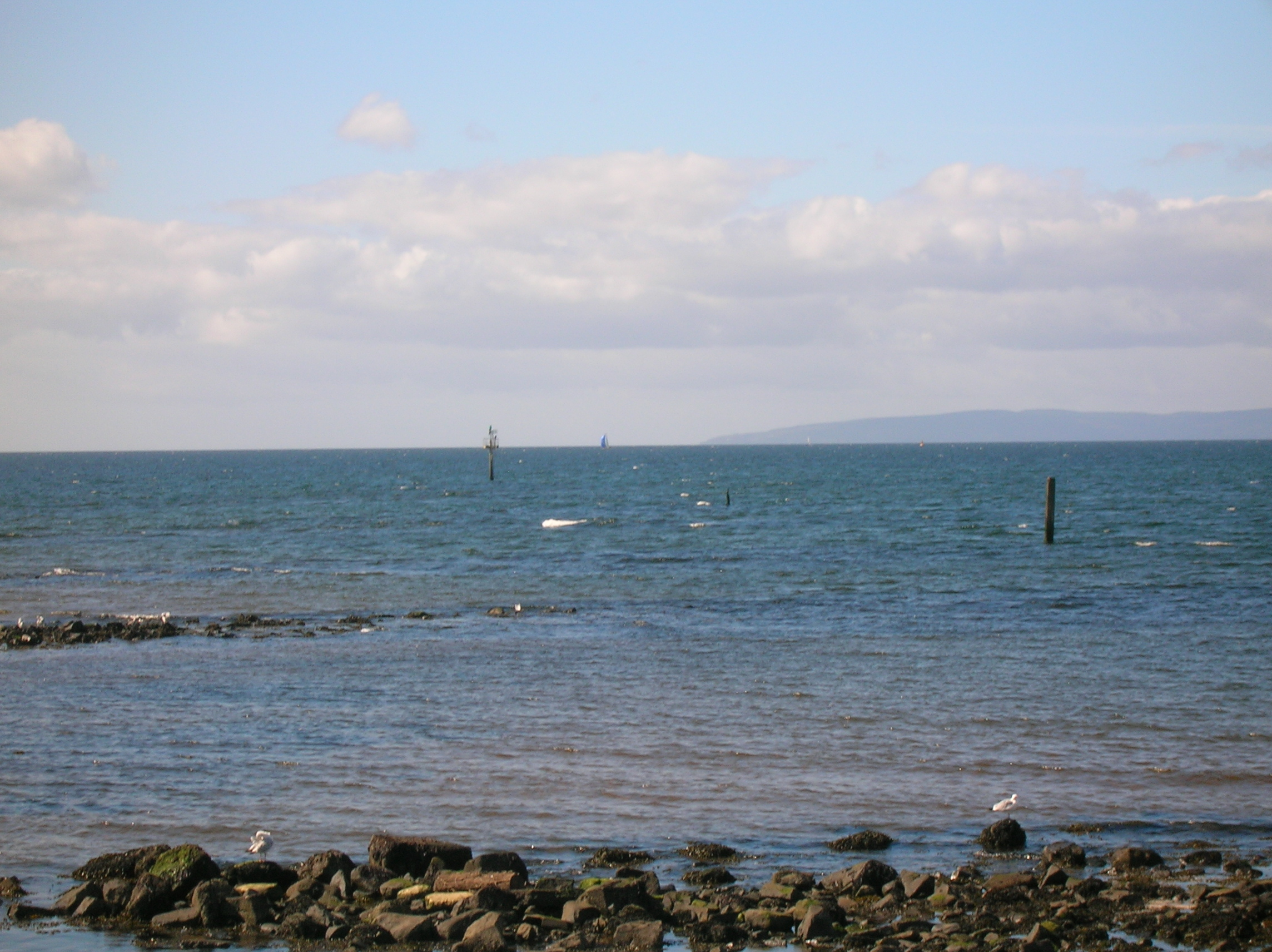
The Irvine bar channel entrance with the Isle of Arran in the distance and one of the old harbour lights on the post to the left.

Since Irvine Harbour is tidal and the confluence of the Rivers Garnock and Irvine is close to the mouth, the bar constrains the harbour's development. In the 18th century the bar compounded the problem of silting to the extent that in 1753 a government report on Irvine Harbour stated that it was "choked up with sand banks" and vessels were sometimes unable to depart for several months.

In addition to acquiring a dredger in the late 1750s, the Irvine Harbour Authorities constructed stone breastworks facing downstream and projecting at an angle into the river, so that the harbour would be self-cleaning. These are still visible today. Dredging could maintain the required depth of water at the bar, but captains of vessels wishing to enter the harbour had no way of knowing the depth of the water in the channel. The Tidal Harbour Commissioners report on Irvine Harbour in 1847 contained the information that there was a signal post upon an eminence close to the harbour upon which balls are raised to indicate the state of the tide. Tugs and other ships also took the news of the depth of water over the bar to ships waiting in the bay.

=== Competition with other Ayrshire ports. ===
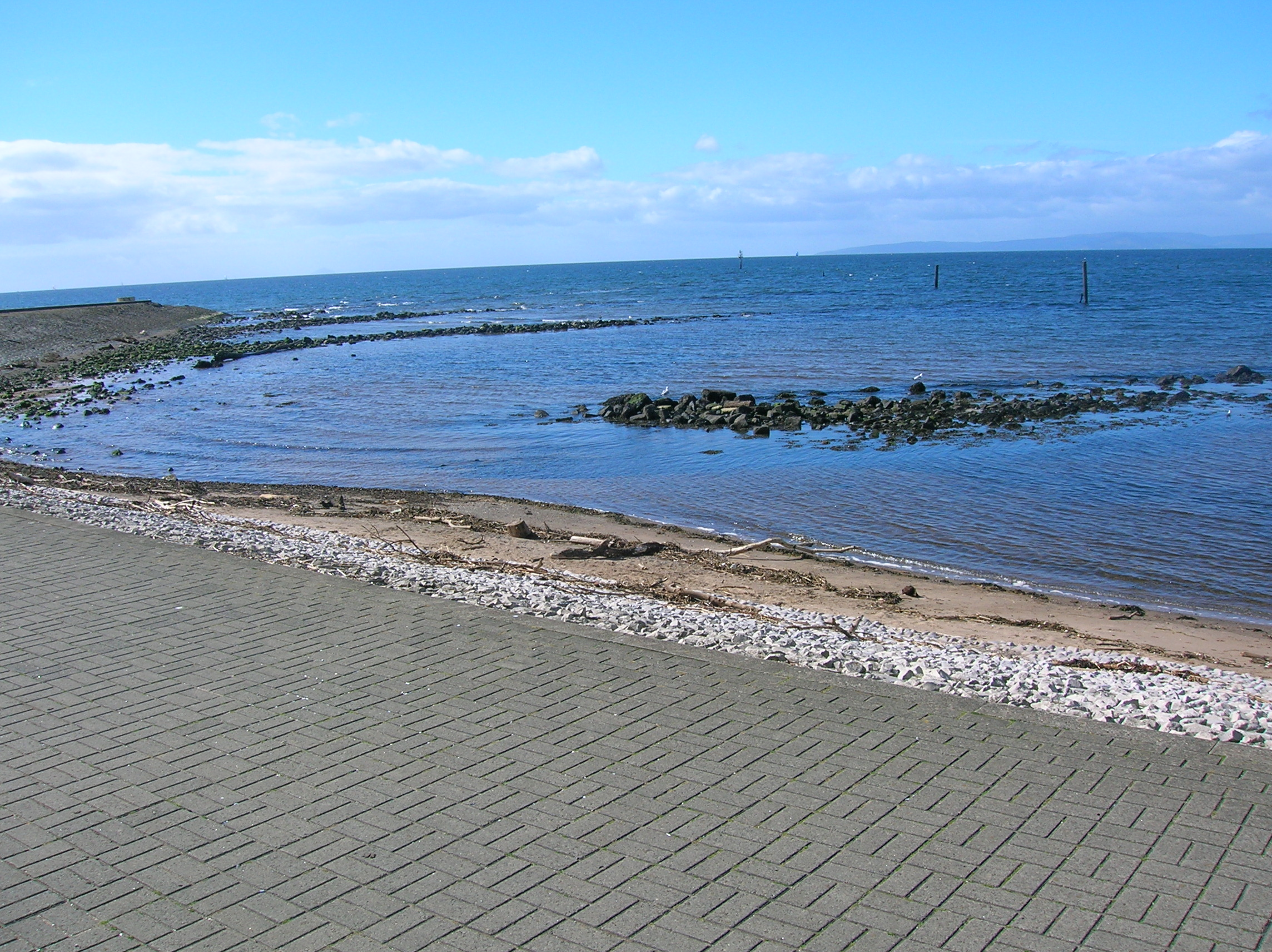
Irvine bar and the 'breastworks'

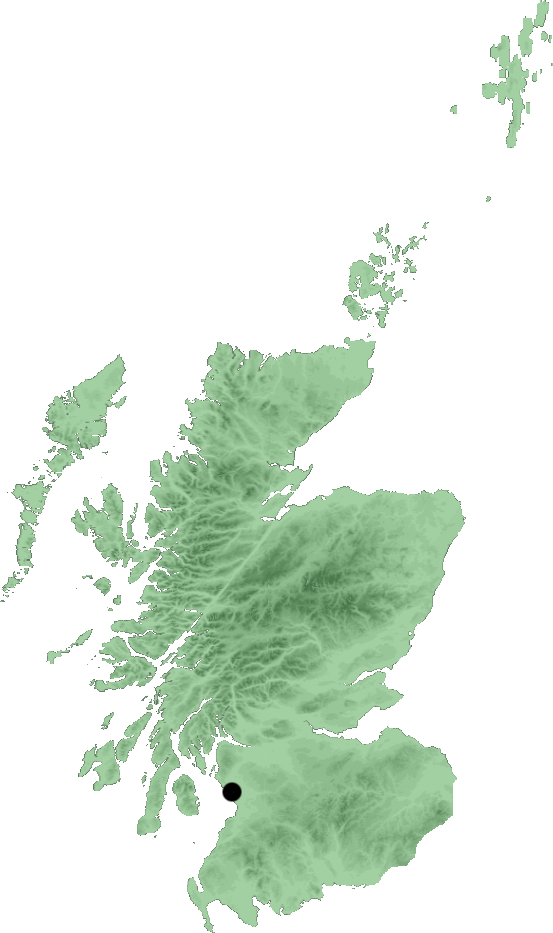
The location of Irvine in Scotland

In the early 1900s Irvine was losing trade to two nearby ports, namely Troon, owned by the Glasgow and South Western Railway Company, and to Ardrossan, another railway owned harbour. It was against this background that the Irvine Harbourmaster, one Martin Boyd, of 56 Harbour Street, set about determining ways to improve the access to the harbour and its facilities.

== Martin Boyd, Harbourmaster ==
Martin Boyd designed and patented an Automatic Tide Marker Station (ATMS) on 7 May 1903. The introduction to his application for a patent for this ATMS, states that it is to be an apparatus for automatically signalling the depth of water at harbours, docks, piers, navigable channels or the like. A postcard of 1906 shows him standing in front of his tower.

In the 1840s, John Wood, a famous Greenock shipbuilder, made a self-registering tide gauge at his Greenock yard that operated from a tidal trench cut from the river up to his office window.

== The Automatic Tide Marker Station ==
The tide marker station, called the 'Automatic Tide Signalling Apparatus' was actuated by the rise or fall of the tide or water level and by means of a float connected via wires to the marker station a code of light signals by night and a code of balls or like signals by day were automatically operated. Boyd was reimbursed by the Harbour Authorities the sum of £60.00 to cover his expenses in building the apparatus.

There was a manual system in the 1830s, Tom Tennant was the operator, based at a signal station on the top of sand hills. Tom hoisted balls to indicate the depth of water on the bar, and also acted as ferryman across the river.

=== How it worked ===
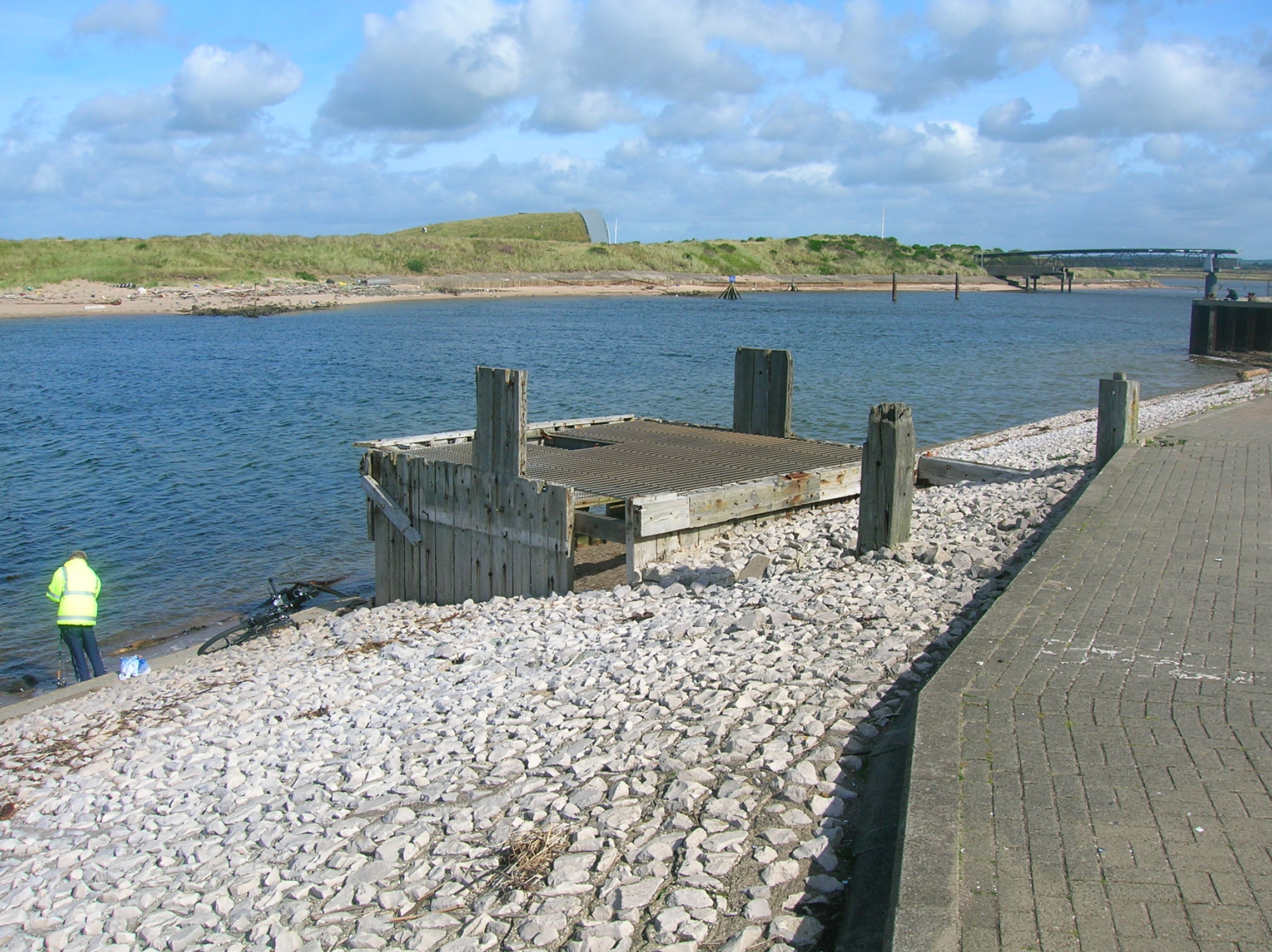
The tank that held the flotation chamber for Boyd's Automatic tide signalling apparatus.

The system entailed the provision of a floating chamber, or 'Tide gauge' (at NS 30369 37993) in this case made of timber, situated at some distance from the structure and calibrated in such a manner as to represent the tide depth at the harbour bar. In the case of Irvine, the bar and the flotation chamber are some distance apart. Within the chamber a wooden float like a raft rose and fell according to the tide. Attached to this float was a cable, which ran through a wooden trough to the building, named the 'Pilot House' by the locals (at NS 30386 37970) which housed the apparatus. Changes in direction, the difference between the actual tide heights and the distance between the balls/lights, was achieved by pulleys and gearing. Within the building the cable was attached to eclipsers, metal frames with wheels which ran on rails attached to the building. The eclipsers, two in number, rose and fell with the tide. As the eclipser rose, it covered apertures through which a gas light had been previously observed. This light, from the main gas supply, was automatically switched off as the eclipser continued up but a by-pass jet always remained alight to maintain a supply to the main jet when the eclipser descended. At night the tide depth was indicated by the use of lights which diminished in number as the tide went out and vice versa.

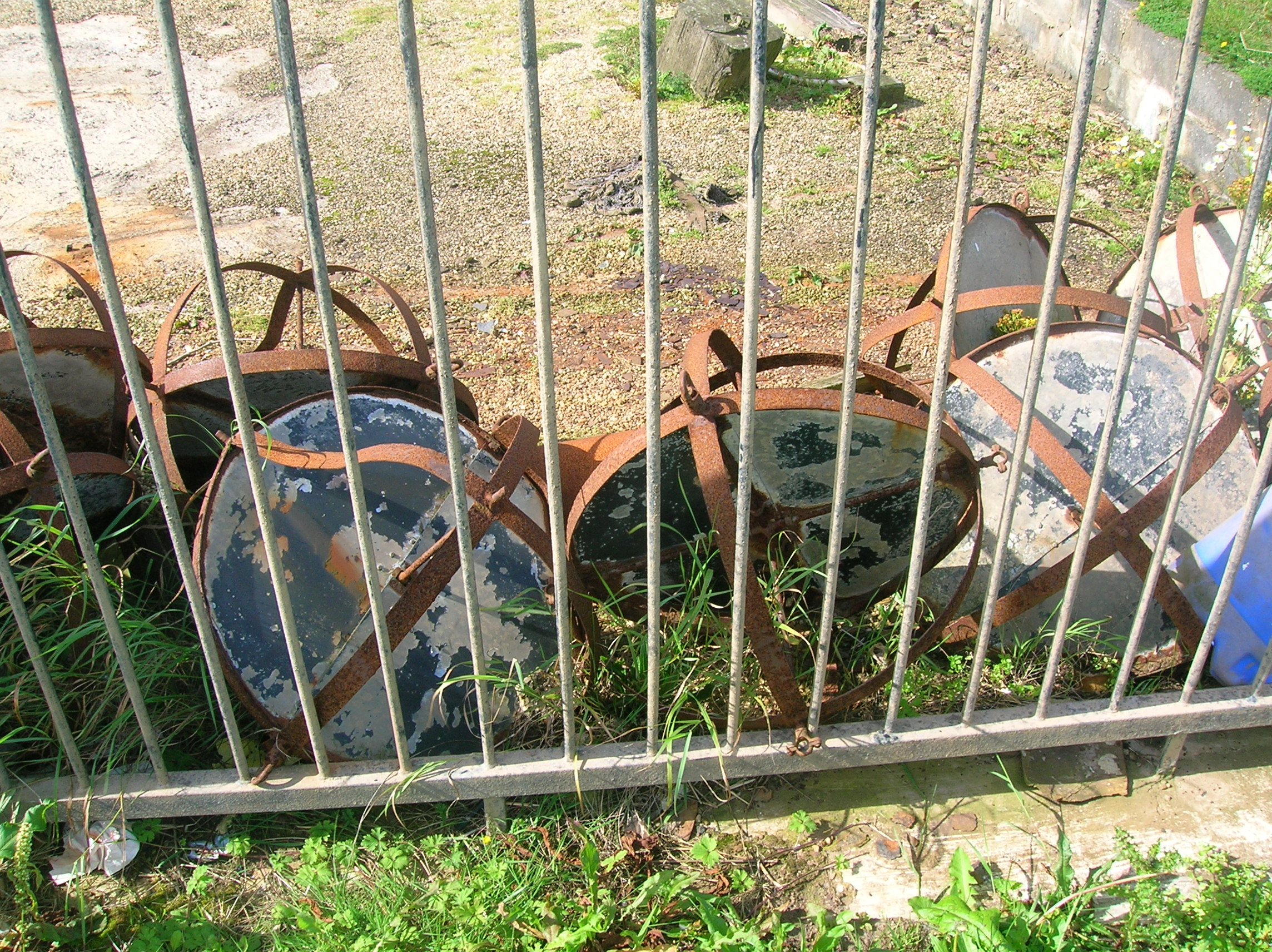
The remains of the black ball indicators in 2007.

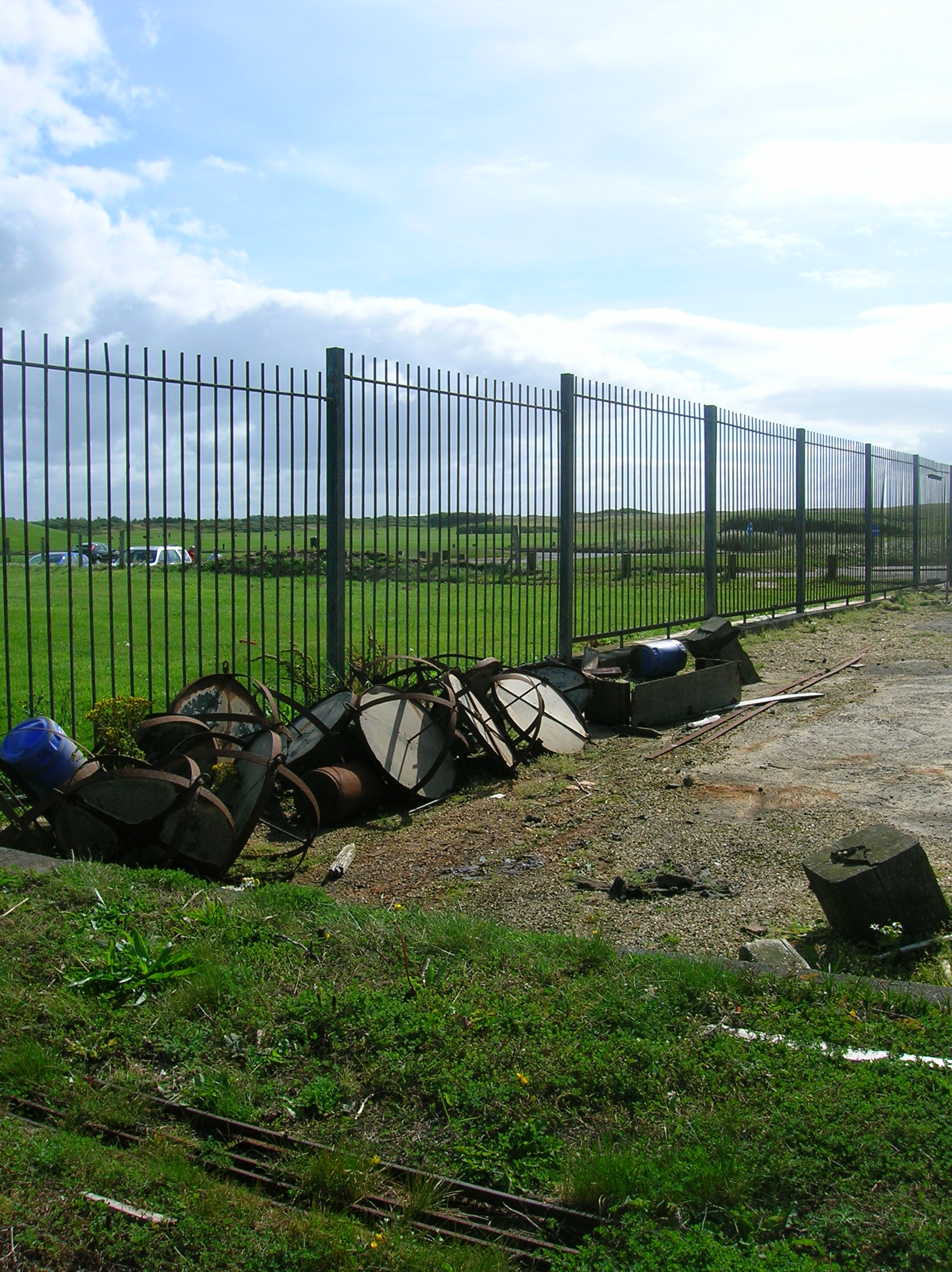
The remains of the black ball indicators in 2007 with the Irvine Model Club's railway trackwork in the foreground.

A code of different colours controlled by the blinds was used. During the hours of daylight, the method of indication was a code of black balls which were fixed to ropes connected to the eclipsers. These ropes were passed over pulleys attached to a cross arm on a staff at the top of the building. The balls were connected at fixed intervals to the rope and, again as the eclipser rose, the rope and the balls fell and disappeared within the building. The distance between each ball was exactly calibrated to tie in with the switching on / off of the lights. To correspond with the change in colour of the lights different shape balls were proposed but never installed. The code of balls / lights indicated by the system involved more balls / lights being displayed as the depth increased, the maximum being twelve balls at 18 feet of depth during the day or four white lights by night.

Adjacent to the Automatic Tide Marker Station building another signal system existed to indicate whether vessels could enter or leave the harbour. On a flag staff, two red lights hung vertically by night or two black balls hung vertically by day, were displayed when a vessel should not enter or leave. At the bar entrance was a white light to the south and northern one which flashed on and off continuously to give skippers their bearings.

=== The Pilot House ===
The fifty foot tower which housed the system was completed in 1906 and the external facings of the brick building are harled and painted white to make it visible for some distance from out at sea. To this day it is a useful landmark for users of small craft. Although the building appears as a simple square four story tower, there is only one floor above ground level and above that is a void, housing the actual signal equipment, the balls originally being made of canvas stretched over a metal frame. Situated at each floor level, on the seaward side, is a small landing with ladders connecting to the one above or below. The ladders allowed access to the working equipment of the system, including the lights. Each landing also had a window. The ground floor was used by the harbour pilots as their mess room. As a result of this, the building became known locally as 'The Pilot House.'

Views of the 'Pilot house' - 2007

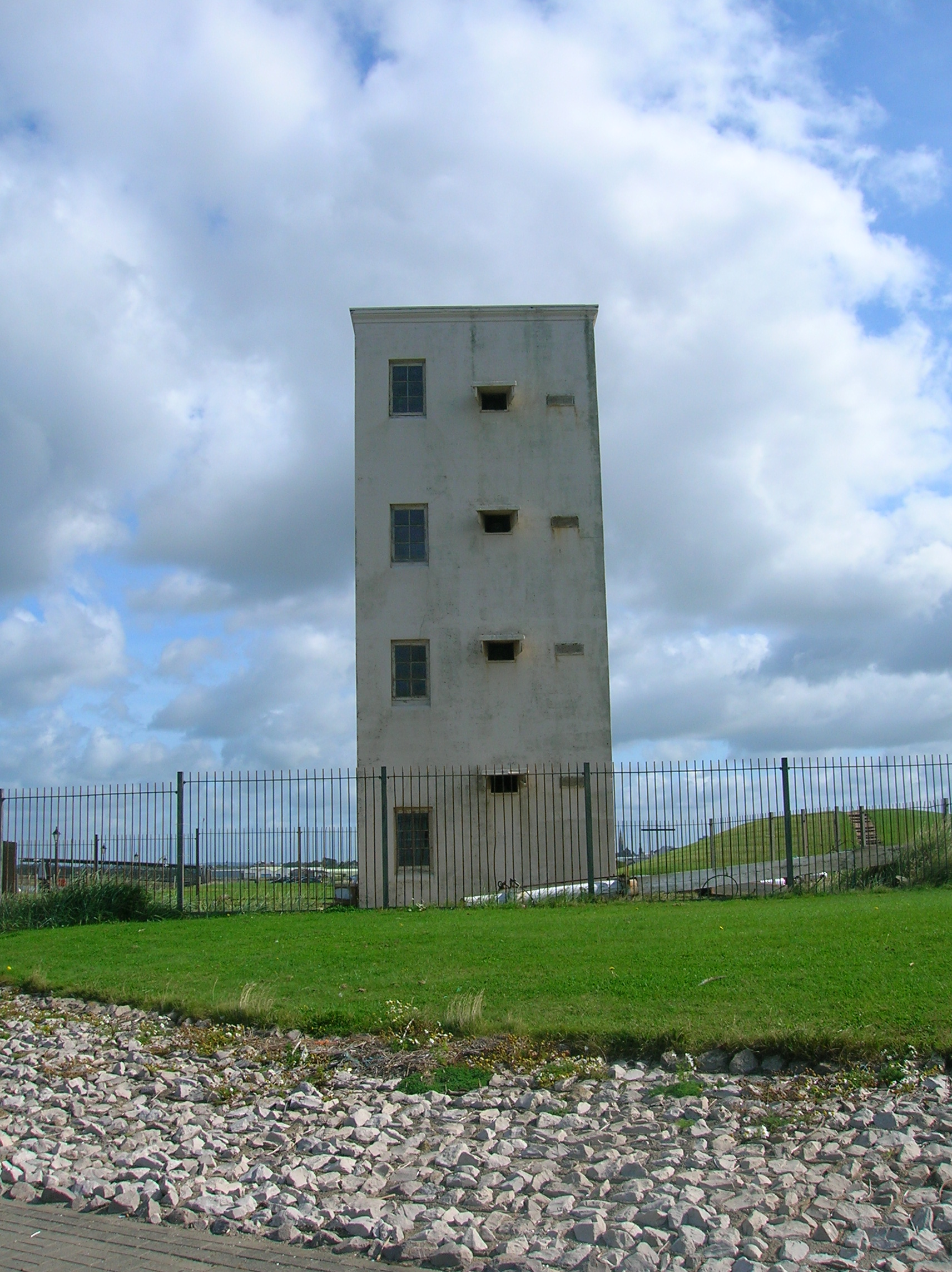
The side facing the sea with the 'hooded' light housings visible.

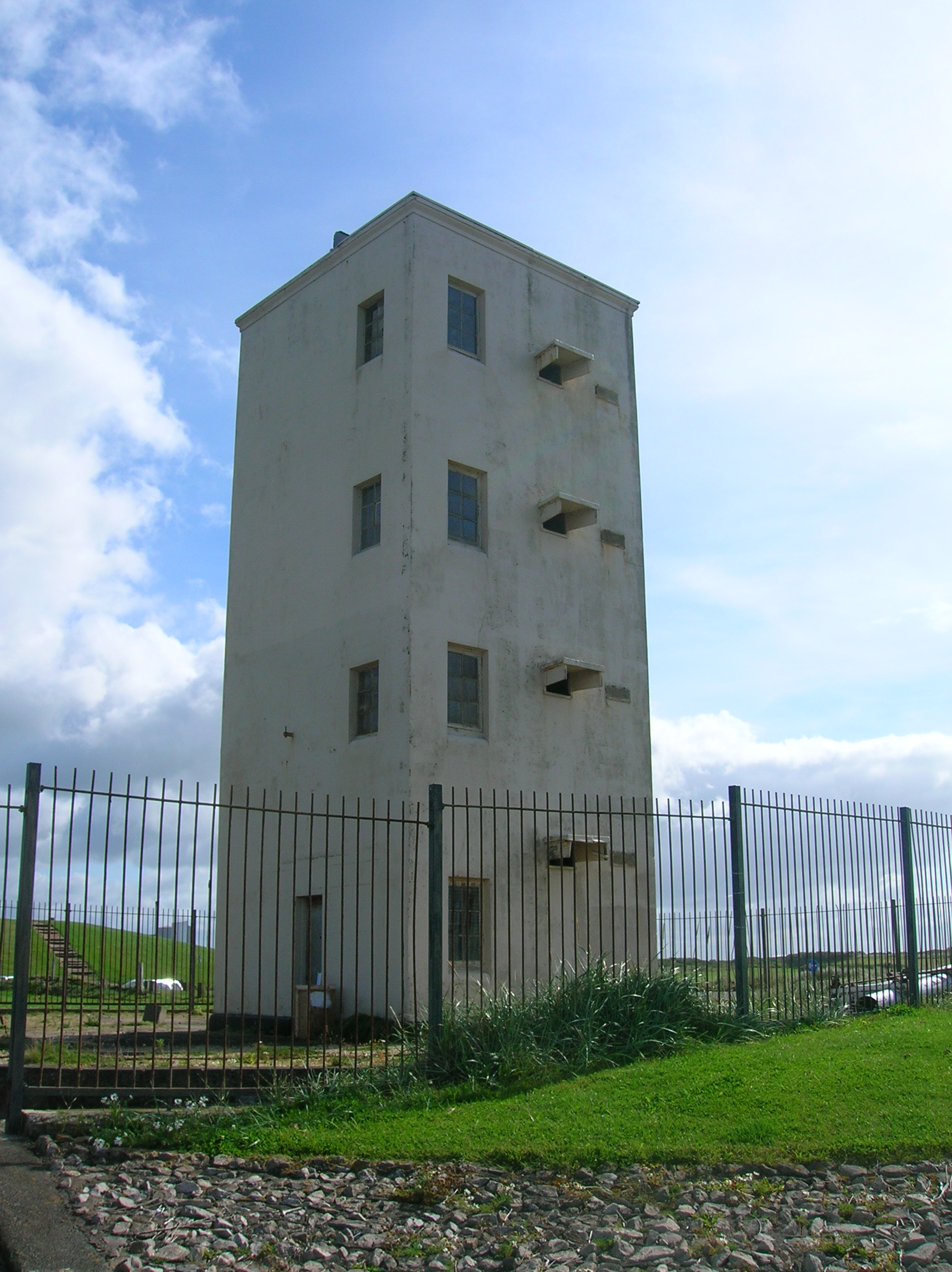
The side facing the sea with the 'hooded' light housings and part of the old 'black balls' mast lying on the ground.

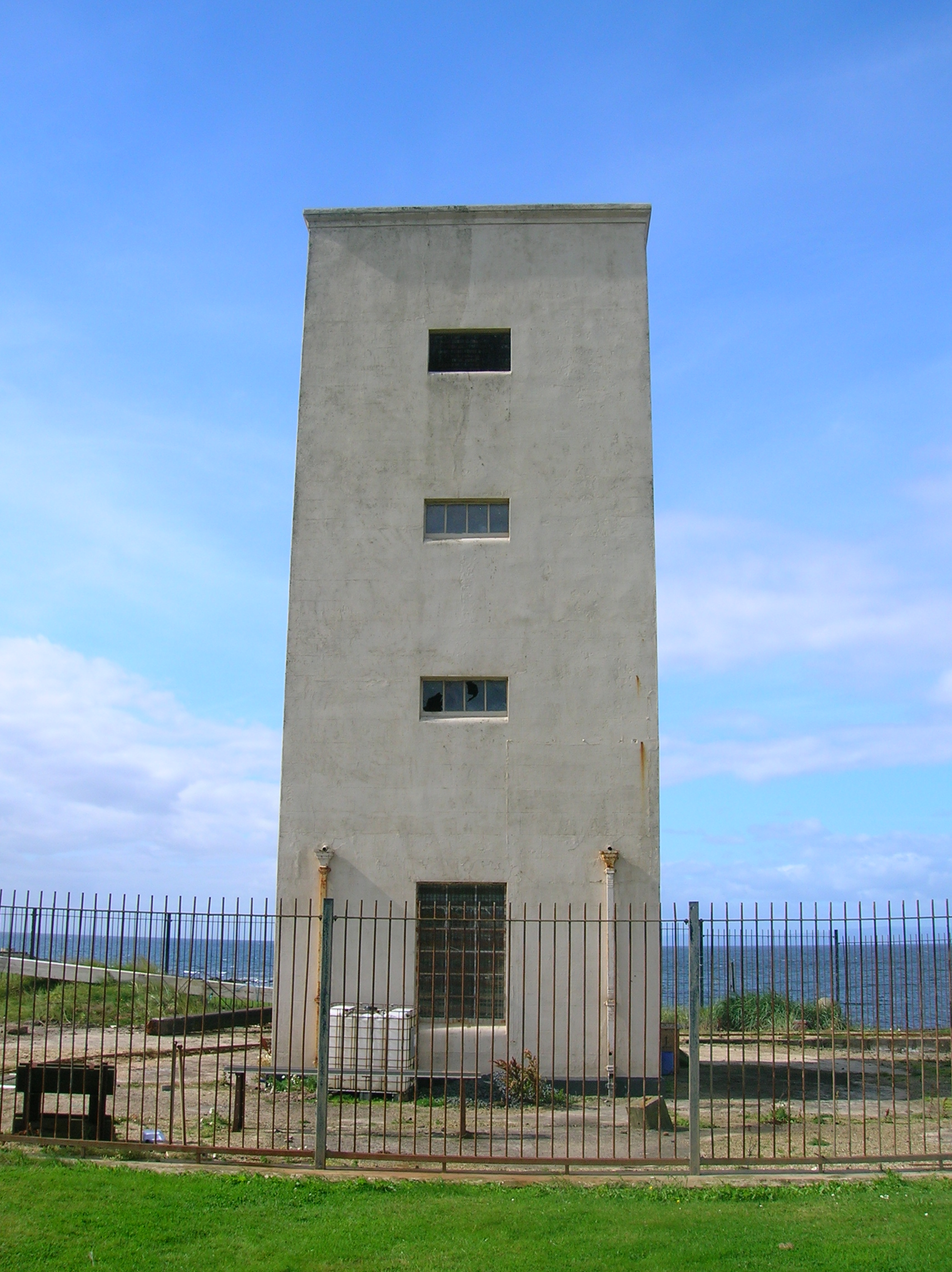
Landward facing side.

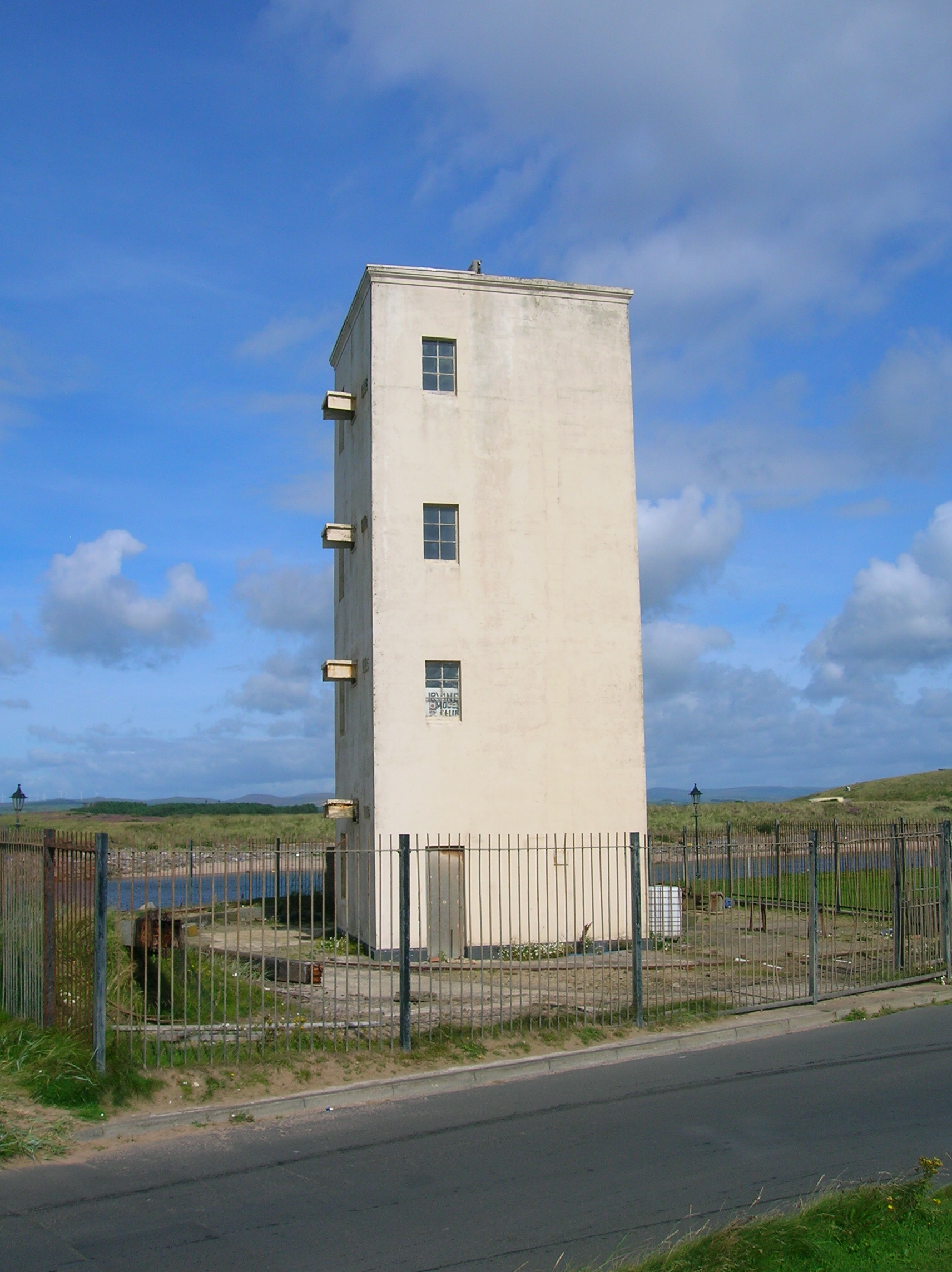
The side facing towards Troon with the 'hooded' light housings visible.

=== Official opening ===
On 23 May 1906 the opening ceremony was attended by the Provost of Irvine, members and officials of the Irvine Harbour Trust, Councillors, other prominent citizens and members of the general public. The usual speeches and presentations took place and afterwards the official party left the harbour by the steam paddle tug George Brown, travelling to Largs further up the Clyde Coast. They returned 'suitably refreshed' at 22.00 hrs to carry out a night inspection of the lights. By 22.15 hrs they had re-entered the harbour and were 'completely satisfied with the Automatic Tide Marker Station'.

A newspaper advertisement at the time stated:

Notice to Mariners - The Irvine Harbour Trustees hereby give notice that they have erected Boyd's patent AUTOMATIC TIDE SIGNALLING APPARATUS, which will be opened on Wednesday 23rd curt., and will from that day exhibit from a tower a code of ball signals. The tower is situated 40 yards or thereby southwards of the present green light.

Views of Irvine harbour - 2007

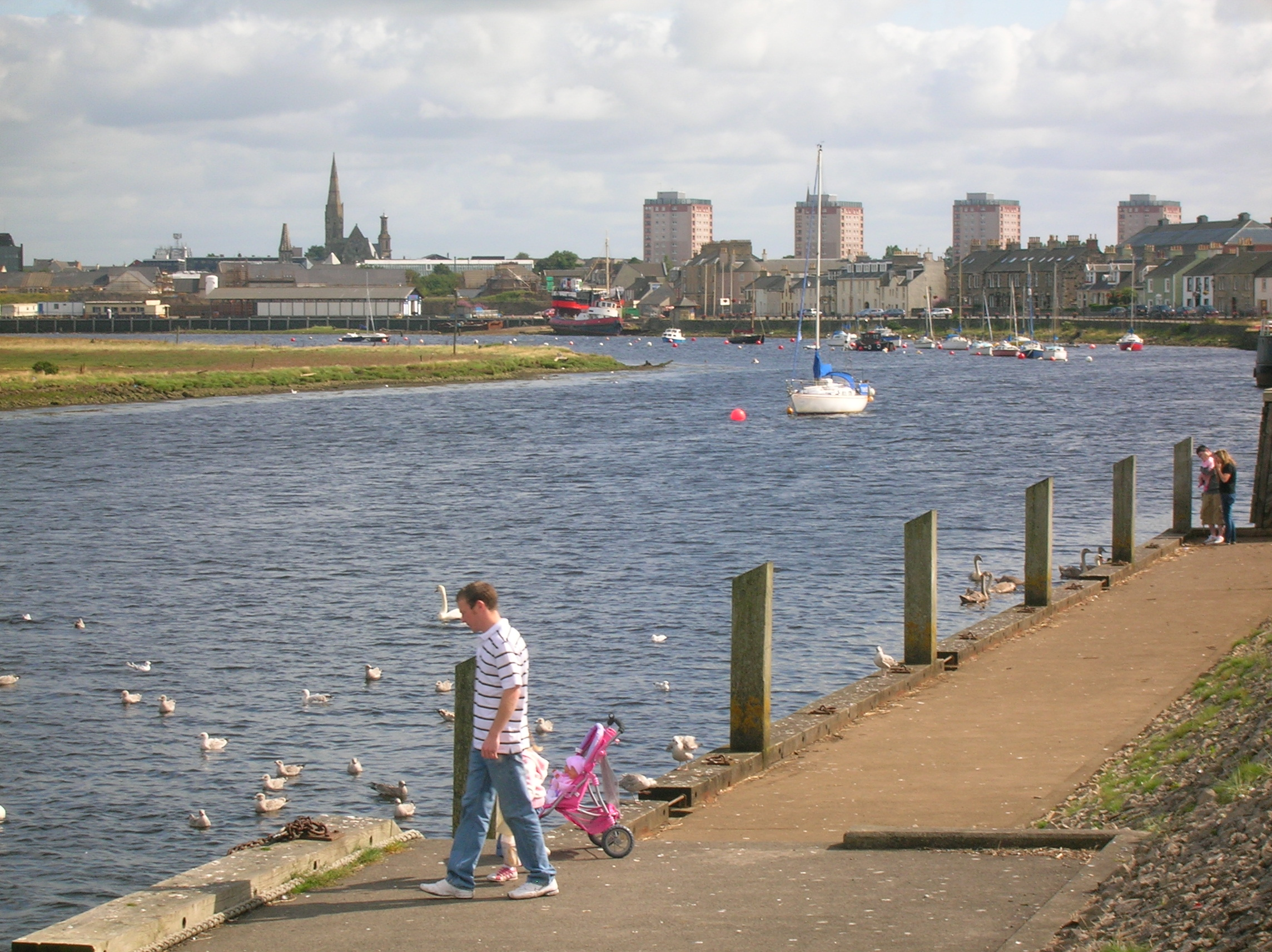
The river Irvine with the town in the background.

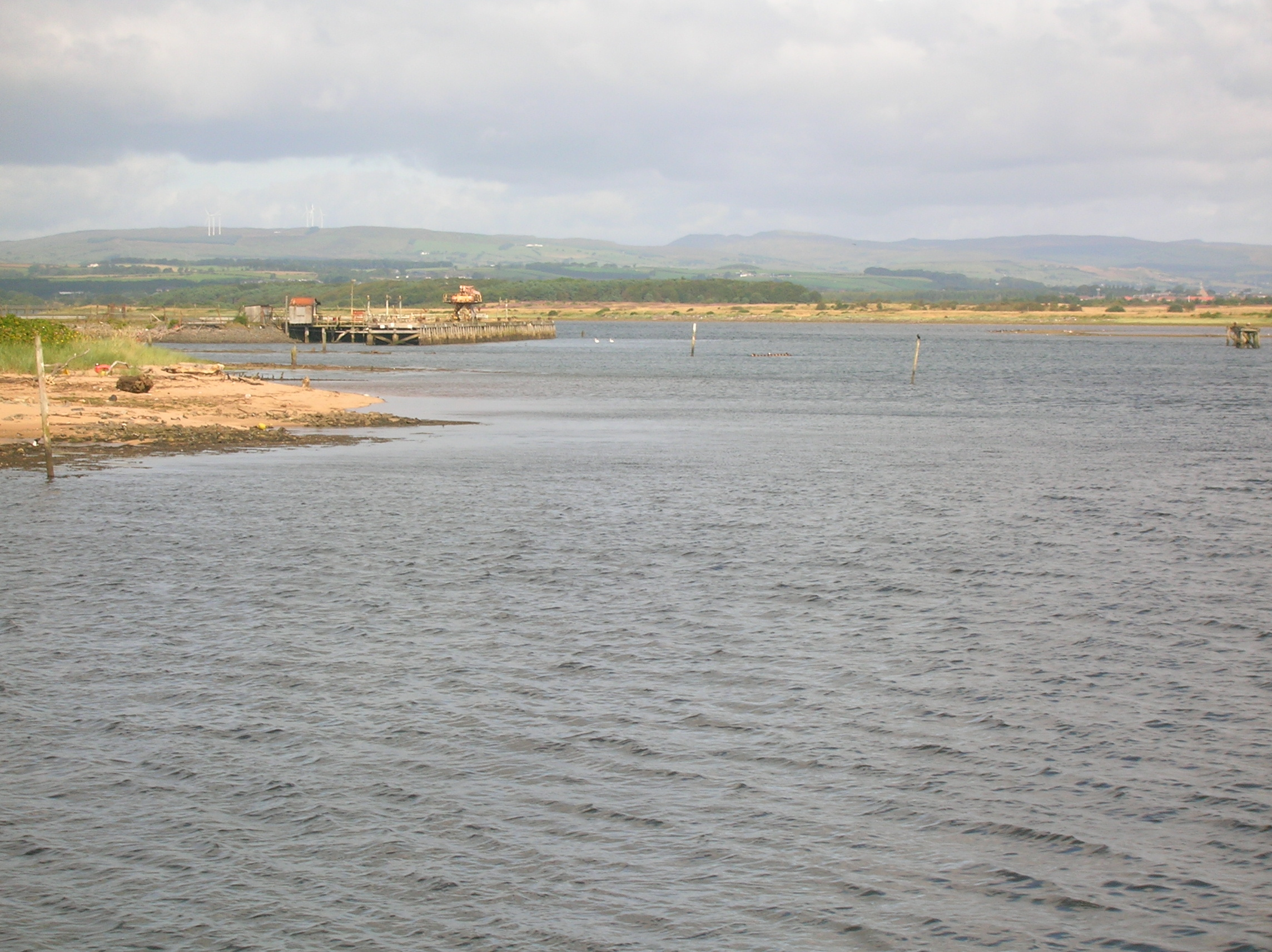
The river Garnock with the old ICI Explosives' jetty to the left.

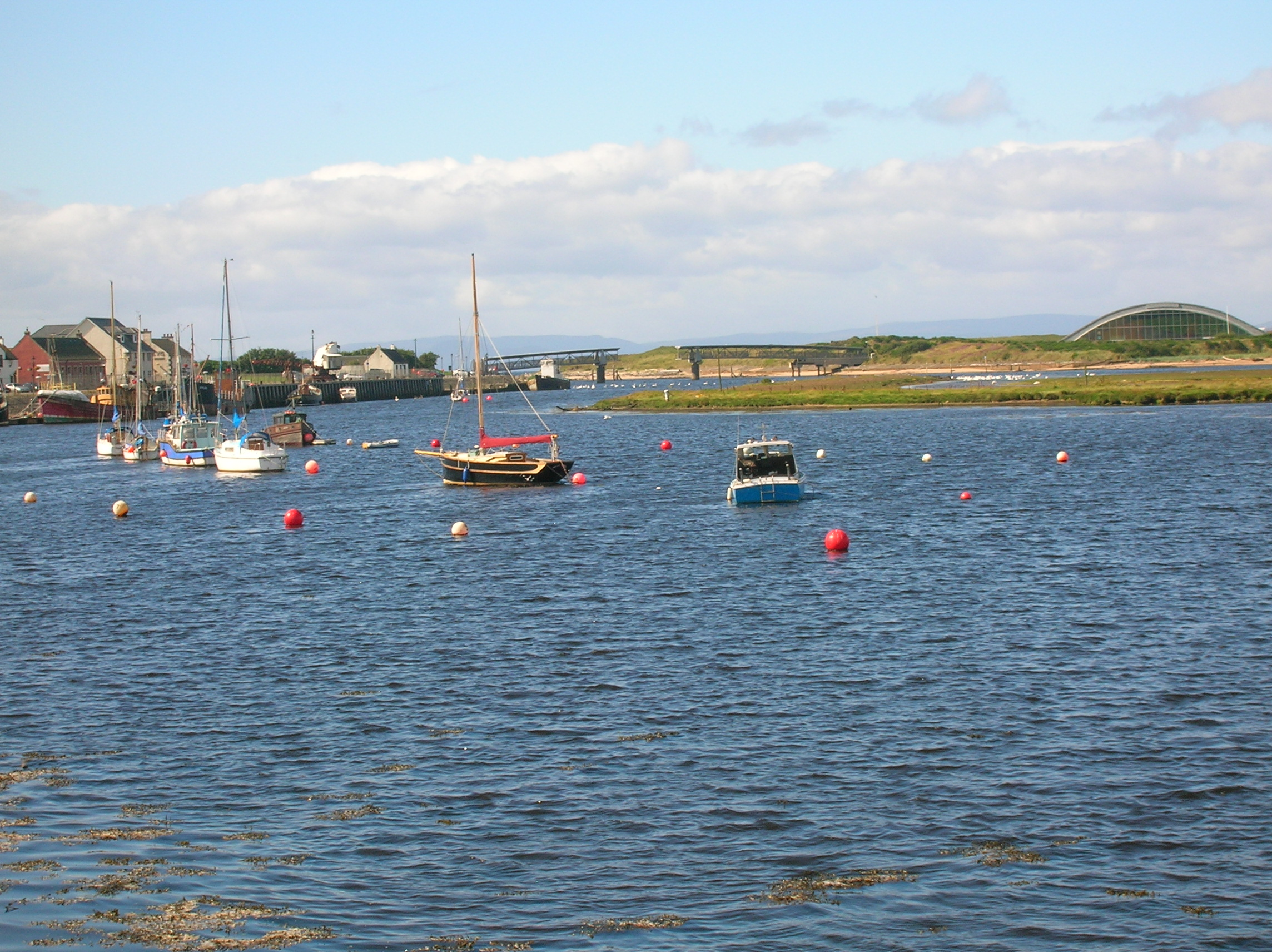
Looking seaward towards the Scottish Maritime Museum's pontoons, with the closed 'Big Idea' building and footbridge in the background.

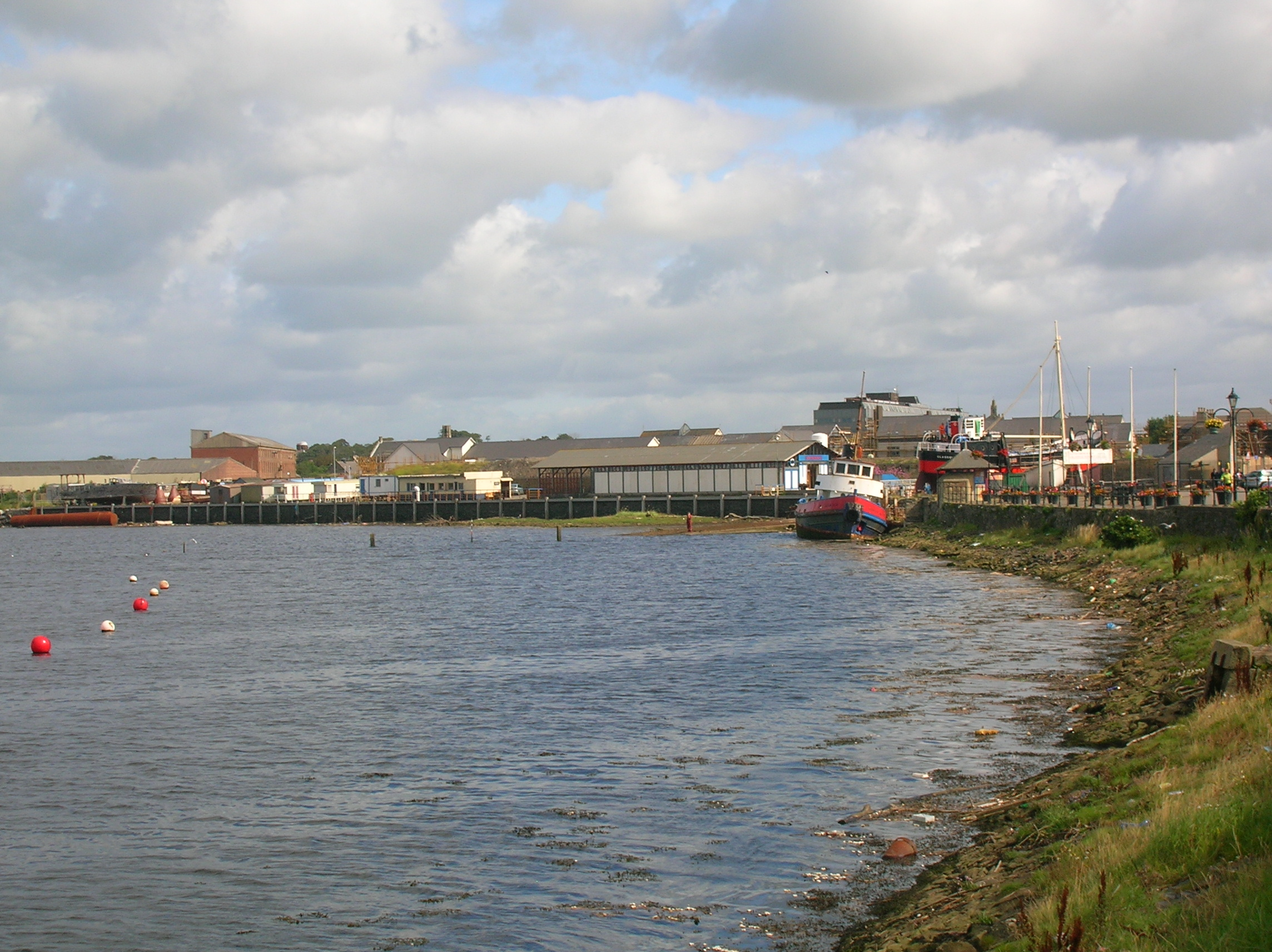
The Scottish Maritime Museum with the old ICI Explosives tug MV Garnock to the right.

== The decline of Irvine harbour ==
The Automatic Tide Marker Station achieved its objectives. However, Irvine harbour's fortunes still declined, partly because of it being a tidal harbour and partly because of intense rivalry from other local ports. Latterly, explosives from the ICI plant were the only cargo handled in the harbour, and this trade ceased in the early 1990s.

=== The abandonment of the automatic tide signalling apparatus ===
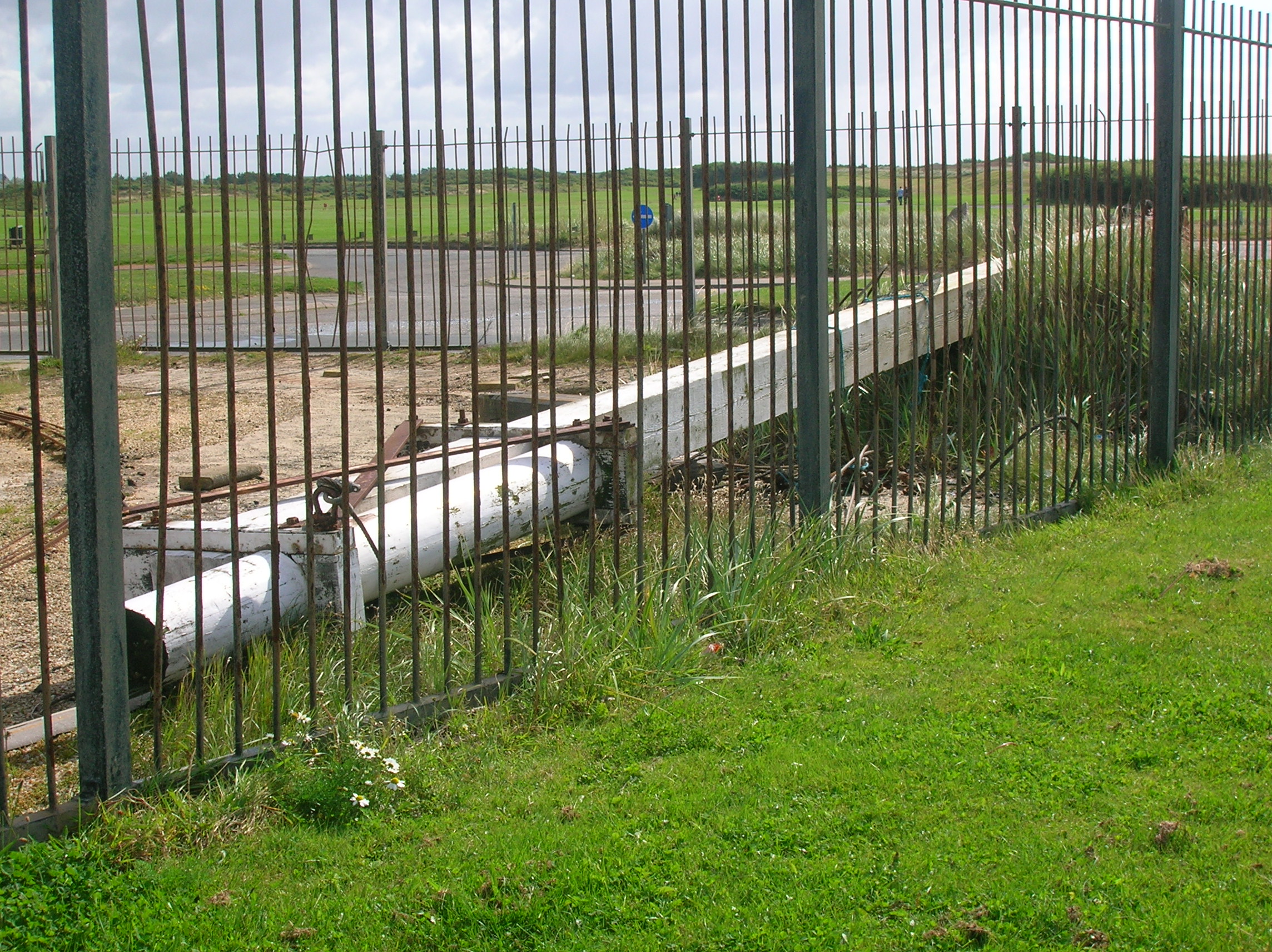
The remains of the 'black balls' mast.

The 'Pilot House' was updated with electric lights, adjustments and re-calibration being made to compensate for the silting up of the riverside tank. The system, however fell into disuse in the early 1970s and the building gradually deteriorated to the extent that rain water was penetrating the structure, leading to rot of the upper landing and structure timbers. Settlement of the building resulted in cracks appearing around the window lintels and sills. The float chamber became totally silted up, the connecting wooden trough for the cables disappeared and the signal equipment gradually decayed within the building.

The building and system have protective listing as a category 'B' structure and in 1989, Irvine Development Corporation (IDC) carried out substantial repairs. Attempts by the Scottish Maritime Museum and others have been made to restore the unique building and system fully (it is thought however that another similar structure may have been built in Northern France). The building was leased to the Irvine Model Boat Club, and a model railway club were very active some years back (datum 2007), laying model railway track on the site and out onto the grass nearby. Since this time most of the mast has been removed and the structure now has an air of total neglect.

== Restoration of the Pilot House ==
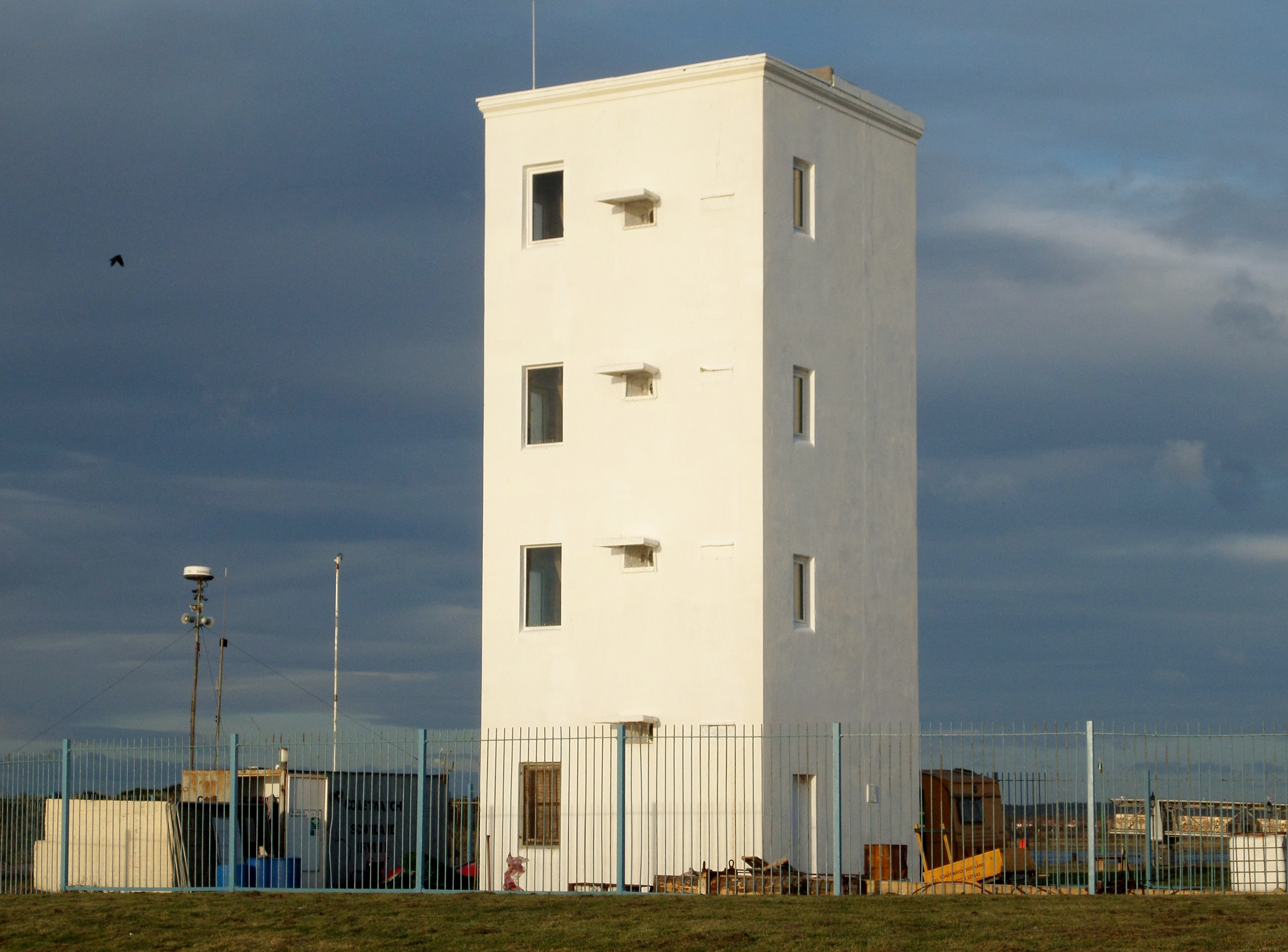
Pilot House restoration as a Coastwatch UK base.

In 2013 an initiative by Coastwatch Scotland, a Voluntary Coastal Monitoring and Safety organisation, got underway in an attempt to turn the building into a watch tower for the benefit of the people of Irvine and visitors. In November 2016 the first stage was completed with an overall roof installed, new windows, a new door, the building re-painted and a radio aerial installed.

== Micro-history ==
A Royal Observer Corps watchtower was based here during WW2 as the building gave a wide panoramic view of the Firth of Clyde. It is credited with the first visual sighting of Rudolf Hess's Messerschmitt Bf 110 in 1941.

In 2014 James Miller, a well known matchstick model builder, constructed a model of the 'Pilot House' using old photographs as a guide and presented this to the Scottish Maritime Museum as an addition to their collections and to assist with the museum's interpretative display regarding this unique structure.
