= Clan Montgomery =

Lowland Scottish clan

- MacGumerait
- Crest: A lady (Judith, of the Bible) dressed in ancient apparel Azure holding in her dexter hand an anchor and in her sinister hand the head of a savage (Holofernes) couped suspended by the hair all Proper
- Motto: Garde bien (Watch well)

Profile
- Region: Lowlands

Chief
- Hugh Archibald William Montgomerie
- The 19th Earl of Eglinton and 7th Earl of Winton
- Seat: Balhomie, Perthshire.
- Historic seat: Eglinton Castle
Clan branches
Earls of Eglinton (chiefs)
Montgomery of Giffen
See also:
Montgomery baronets
Allied clans
Clan Seton
Rival clans
Clan Cunningham
Clan Boyd

Clan Montgomery (also Montgomerie) is a Scottish clan of the Scottish Lowlands.

== History ==
=== Origins of the Clan ===
The Montgomeries (descended from the Norman Earl Roger de Montgomery) emigrated from Wales to Scotland in the 12th century with the FitzAlans. The Cambro-Norman family derives its surname from lands in Wales, likely from the Honour of Montgomery which was located near the Shropshire lands of the FitzAlans. It is disputed, but there is evidence of a direct connection between Clan Montgomery and the family of the Counts de Montgomerie, Earls of Shrewsbury, of Anglo-Norman origin who derived their surname from lands in Calvados, Normandy. The surname was shortened to de Montgomerie after 1015 before becoming de Montgomerie of Eaglesham shortly after 1120.

The earliest member of the clan in Scotland was Robert of Montgomery, and the earliest possessions of the clan (in Scotland) was Eaglesham, in Renfrewshire. Members of the clan are recorded in the late 13th century Ragman Rolls, but it is not until the 14th century when the family rose in prominence, through a dynastic marriage with the Eglinton family. Through this marriage the clan acquired the Eglinton estates; the clan also acquired the lands of the Ardrossan family (which was possibly a branch of the Barclay family).

=== Wars of Scottish Independence ===
In 1296 John de Montgomery and his brother are recorded on the Ragman Rolls rendering homage to Edward I of England. A later Sir John Montgomery was one of the heroes at the Battle of Otterburn in 1388 where the English were defeated. He captured Henry (Hotspur) Percy and the Percy family paid a great ransom for his release. The money enabled Montgomery to build the Polnoon Castle.

=== 15th & 16th century Clan Conflicts ===
Eglinton Castle built around 1800, behind the Tournament Bridge of 1845.

In 1488 Hugh Montgomery, the third Lord Montgomery was on the victors side at the Battle of Sauchieburn, and Alexander Cunningham, 1st Earl of Glencairn slain with the defeated James III. Montgomery was rewarded with the grant for life of the Isle of Arran as well as ballie of Bute and Cunningham. However Cunningham was claimed by the Cunninghams of Glencairn (chiefs of Clan Cunningham), and feud arose between the two clans in which the Cunninghams burnt down Montgomery's Eglinton Castle. Cunningham's Kerelaw Castle was also burned down.

During the 16th century the long-running feud continued. Edward Cunningham of Auchenharvie was slain in 1526 and Archibald Cunningham of Waterstoun in 1528; the Montgomery's Eglinton Castle was burned down by the Cunninghams in the same year. In April 1586, Hugh Montgomery, 4th Earl of Eglinton, aged twenty-four, was travelling to Stirling to join the Court having been commanded to attend by the King, accompanied only by a few domestic servants. He stopped at Lainshaw Castle to dine with his close relative, a Montgomery, the Lord of Lainshaw, whose Lady was a Margaret Cunningham of Aiket Castle, with sisters married to John Cunningham of Corsehill and David Cunninghame of Robertland. It seems that a plot to kill the Earl had been organised and the Lady, or some say a servant girl who was also a Cunningham, climbed to the battlements after the meal to hang out a white table napkin and thereby sprung the trap. Thirty Cunninghames attacked the Earl as he crossed Annick Ford and cut his servants to pieces; the Earl himself was dispatched with a single shot from the pistol of John Cunningham of Clonbeith Castle. His horse carried his dead body along the side of the river, still known as the 'Weeping', 'Mourning' or 'Widows' path. Upon discovering the murder, the Montgomerys killed every Cunningham that they found. A wave of bloody revenge swept over Cunninghame and elsewhere. Cunningham relatives, friends and supporters were killed without mercy. Aiket was killed near his home; Robertland and Corsehill escaped to Denmark. Clonbeith was traced to a house in Hamilton, possibly Hamilton Palace and hacked to pieces by Robert Montgomery and John Pollock. Robert also killed the Earl of Glencairn's brother the Commendator of Kilwinning Abbey, Alexander of Montgreenan, thought to have instigated Hugh's murder. He rode to Montgreenan and shot the Commendator at his own gate.

The government of King James VI of Scotland eventually managed to make the chiefs of the two clans shake hands. In 1661 Lord High Chancellor William Cunningham, 9th Earl of Glencairn, married Margaret Montgomery, daughter of Alexander, 6th Earl of Eglinton, drawing a line under the feud.

The 2nd Earl of Eglinton led the Clan Montgomery in support of Mary, Queen of Scots, at the Battle of Langside in 1568, where the Queen was defeated. The Earl was declared guilty of treason and imprisoned in Doune Castle but was later released upon accepting James VI.

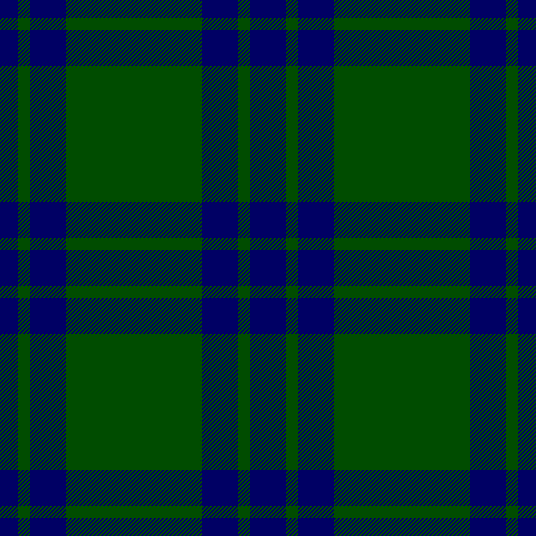
Montegomerye tartan, as published in 1842 in Vestiarium Scoticum.

In 1600 the Clan MacAlister attacked the Clan Montgomery. They seized everything belonging to the Chief John Montgomery of Skelmorlie including £12,000 worth of possessions. Two years later, chief Archibald MacAlister along with Angus Og MacDonald carried out a similar attack on the inhabitants of the Isle of Bute against the Clan Stuart. A year afterwards Archibald MacAlister and Angus Og MacDonald were accused of being rebels, charged with treason and hanged in Edinburgh Tollbooth.

=== 17th century & Civil War ===
When the second Earl of Eglintoun, chief of Clan Montgomery was released after the battle of Langside he had tried to secure the safety and toleration of Catholics in the wake of the Reformation. Ironically his daughter Lady Margaret married Robert Seton of the Clan Seton, the 1st Earl of Winton who was a loyal Covenanter during the Civil War and did not accept the religious policies of Charles I of England. He did however accept Charles II of England and was made a colonel of the King's Lifeguard of Cavalry. He was later captured at Dumbarton and was not released unto after the restoration in 1660.

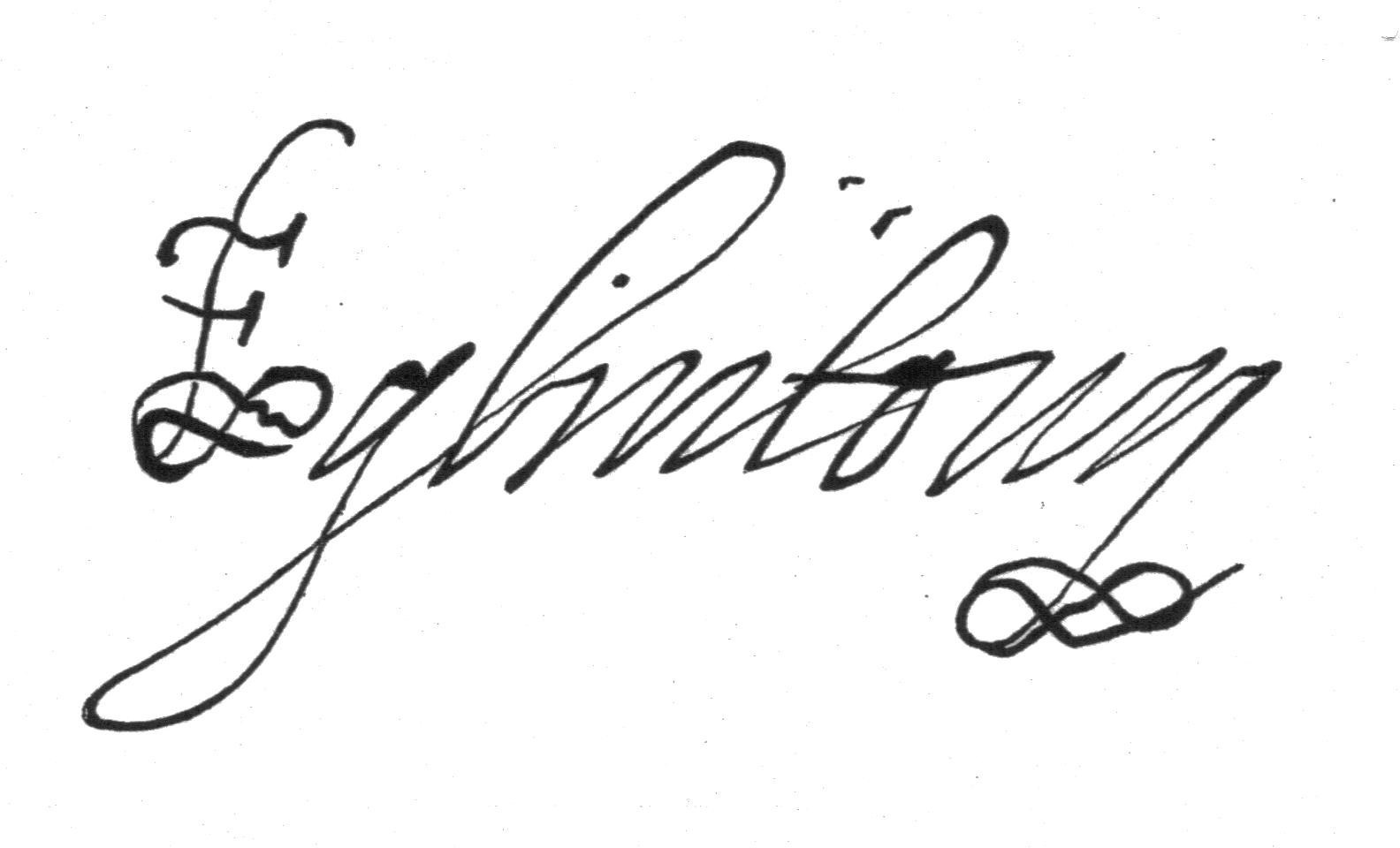
The signature of the Earl of Eglintoun in 1642.

Their son, Alexander Seton took his mother's maiden name of Montgomery and became the 6th Earl of Eglintoun. He was a Protestant supporter of King Charles II. He was imprisoned by General Monck for his Royalist sympathies in 1659.

In 1628 another branch of the Scottish Montgomeries settled in the north of County Donegal in Ulster, Ireland and 1st Viscount Montgomery of Alamein came from this line.

In the seventeenth and eighteenth centuries many Montgomeries served abroad in Continental armies, including those of Sweden, France, Kingdom of Denmark, Russia and Brandenburg-Prussian Army as mercenaries.

=== 18th century & Jacobite Uprisings ===
The 1764 coat of arms of the Montgomerys, Earls of Eglinton.

During the Jacobite Uprisings the Clan Montgomery supported the British government. The clan chief and 9th Earl of Eglinton was on the Privy Council of King William and Queen Anne of the United Kingdom. In 1715 during the first rebellion the chief of Clan Montgomery, 9th Earl was involved in training soldiers for the government.

=== Seven Years' War ===
In 1757 Archibald Montgomerie, 11th Earl and chief of Clan Montgomery raised the British 77th Regiment of Foot from members of the Montgomery clan, along with other clans. This regiment, under General Forbes, built Fort Pitt which eventually developed into Pittsburgh.

=== American Revolutionary War ===
During the American Revolutionary War, General Richard Montgomery fought for the Continental Army, leading part of the Invasion of Quebec. Montgomery's expedition captured Montreal in November. After this, Montgomery joined Benedict Arnold's forces before Quebec City. The combined force assaulted the city on 31 December. The battle was a disastrous defeat for the Continental Army and Montgomery was killed. Many of the places named "Montgomery" in the USA (see Montgomery) are named after Richard Montgomery.

=== World War II ===
Perhaps the most famous of all the Montgomerys was Field Marshal Bernard Montgomery, 1st Viscount Montgomery of Alamein, who was a senior British Army officer during the Second World War.

Bernard Montgomery, nicknamed "Monty", was born into an Ulster Scots 'Ascendancy' family from Inishowen, from a line of Scottish Montgomerys who settled in Ulster in the north of Ireland in 1628.

During the Western Desert campaign of the Second World War, Montgomery commanded the British Eighth Army from August 1942, through the Second Battle of El Alamein and on to the final Allied victory in Tunisia in May 1943.

He subsequently commanded the British Eighth Army during the Allied invasion of Sicily and the Allied invasion of Italy and was in command of all Allied ground forces during the Battle of Normandy (Operation Overlord), from D-Day on 6 June 1944 until 1 September 1944. He then continued in command of the 21st Army Group for the rest of the North West Europe campaign, including Operation Market Garden, the Battle of the Bulge, and Operation Plunder.

By the end of the war, troops under Montgomery's command had taken part in the encirclement of the Ruhr Pocket, liberated the Netherlands, and captured much of north-west Germany. On 4 May 1945, Montgomery accepted the German surrender at Lüneburg Heath.

== Castles and mansions ==
- Annick Lodge
- Ardrossan Castle
- Bourtreehill House
- Caldwell Castle
- Little Cumbrae Castle
- Cunninghamhead Estate
- Dalmore House and Estate
- Eglinton Castle
- Barony and Castle of Giffen
- Hessilhead Castle
- Lainshaw
- The Lands of Montgreenan
- New Park in Moville, Inishowen, County Donegal
- Polnoon Castle
- Seagate Castle
- Skelmorlie Castle, near Largs
- Stanecastle

== See also ==
- Montgomery (name)
- Counts de Montgomerie, Earls of Shrewsbury a noble family of Anglo-Norman origin
- Mac Con Iomaire and Mac an Iomaire – Gaelicised (Irish) forms of the surname Montgomery
- Industry and the Eglinton Castle estate
- Susanna Montgomery, Lady Eglinton
- Robert Burns and the Eglinton Estate
- Eglinton Country Park

== Notes ==
- Grosjean, Alexia; Murdoch, Steve, "ID 3132", The Scotland, Scandinavia and Northern European Database (SSNE), published online by: Saint Andrews University
