= Séamus Mac an Iomaire =

Séamus Mac An Iomaire or Séamus Ridge (1891–1967) was an Irish fisherman, botanist and writer.

== Biography ==
Mac an Iomaire was born at Muighinis in Connemara on 13 January 1891. During 1919–1926, he had a number of stories, essays, songs and lists of terms and proverbs published in the Galway journal An Stoc, edited by Professor Tomás Ó Máille, before emigrating to New York City in the latter year. In New York he taught classes in Irish for the Gaelic Society, and while recovering from tuberculosis in 1927, he wrote Cladaigh Chonamara, or The Shores of Connemara, which was first published in Irish in 1938 and reprinted several times since.

In 1966, he presented a number of his manuscripts to the Irish Folklore Commission, and completed his final work, Conamara Man, before his death on 15 November 1967 and published posthumously.

== Bibliography ==
- Cladaigh Chonamara, Réamh-fhocal ó Tomás Ó Máille, Baile Áth Cliath, 1938.
- Conamara Man, New York, Prentice Hall, 1969.

== See also ==
- Mac an Iomaire
- Mac Con Iomaire
