= Seagate Castle =

Castle and townhouse in Irvine, North Ayrshire, Scotland

- Irvine, North Ayrshire, Scotland; UK
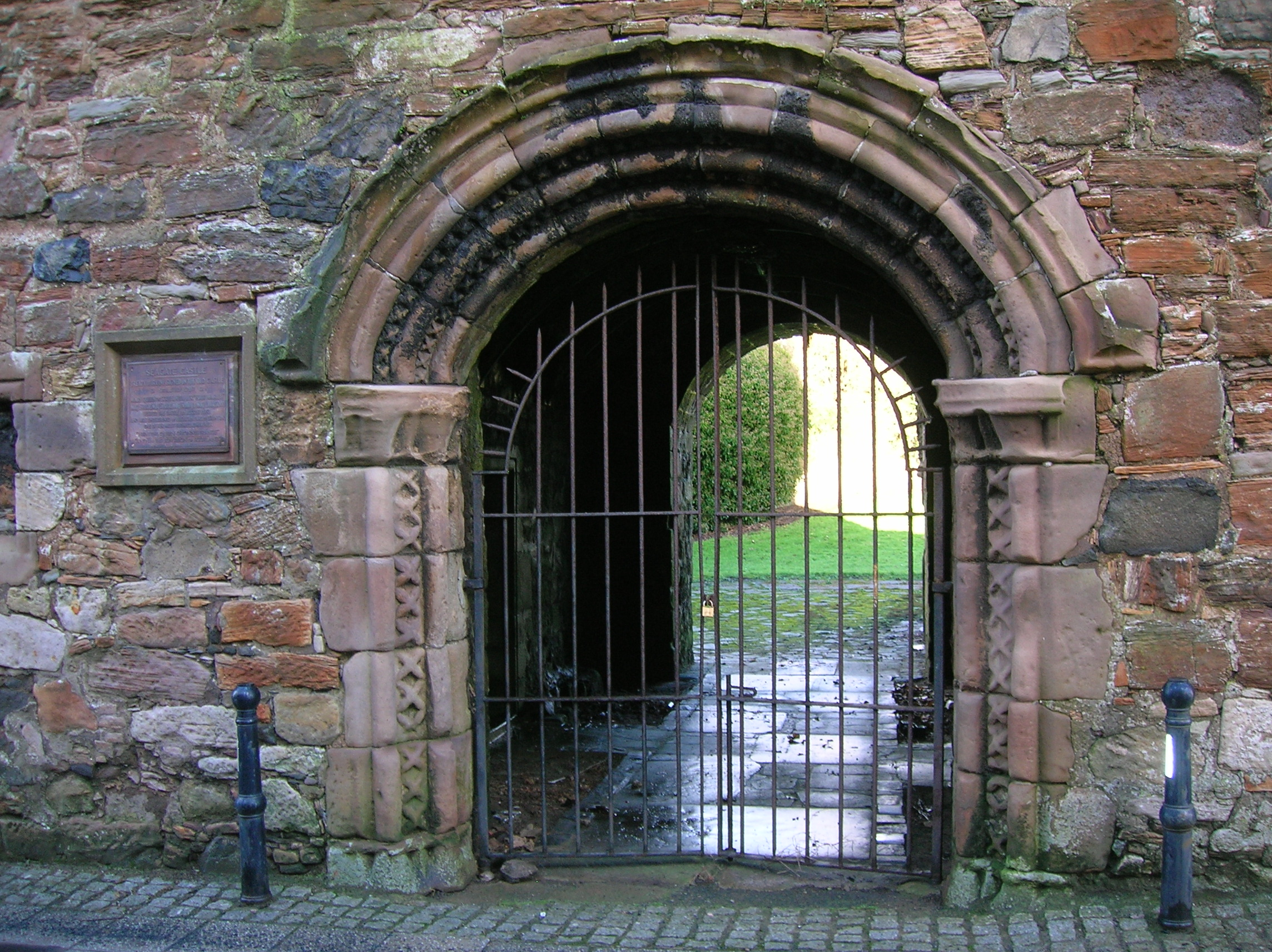
- The castle entrance

Site information
- Owner: Historic Scotland
- Controlled by: Montgomery Clan
- Open to the public: On special occasions
- Condition: Ruin

Location
- Coordinates: 55.616804°N 4.670483°W

Site history
- Built: Sixteenth century
- Materials: Stone

Scheduled monument
- Official name: Seagate Castle
- Type: Secular: castle
- Designated: 23 February 1955
- Reference no.: SM320

Seagate Castle is a castle and fortified town house in North Ayrshire, in the town of Irvine, close to the River Irvine, Scotland. The castle was formerly a stronghold, a town house, and later a dower house of the Montgomery Clan. The castle overlooks the oldest street in Irvine, which was once the main route between the town and the old harbour at Seagatefoot, which by 1606, was useless and abandoned due to silting. The remains of the castle are protected as a scheduled monument.

== History ==
=== The Royal Burgh ===
Etymology
The meaning of Yrewin, c.1140; Irvin, c.1230; Orewin, c.1295 and Irewin, c.1429-30 may be 'west flowing river.' 'Green river' as in the Welsh river named Irfon is also suggested. It has had many other variants, such as Irwyn, c.1322, Irrvin, c.1528, and Irwin, c.1537. Paterson suggests 'clear river'.

The first record of Irvine is in 1163, and the harbour at that time was near the sea-gait or Seagate, the castle being first built to protect it. Progressive silting was recorded by several early authors, who recorded that wind blowing the sand hindered the movement of ships, sometimes stranding them for several months. Irvine was created a Royal Burgh by King Robert II in 1372 and this castle is the last of the town's old civil and ecclesiastical buildings to survive, the Carmelite friary, tollbooth, chapel, bridge, and port having vanished without trace.

=== The castle ===
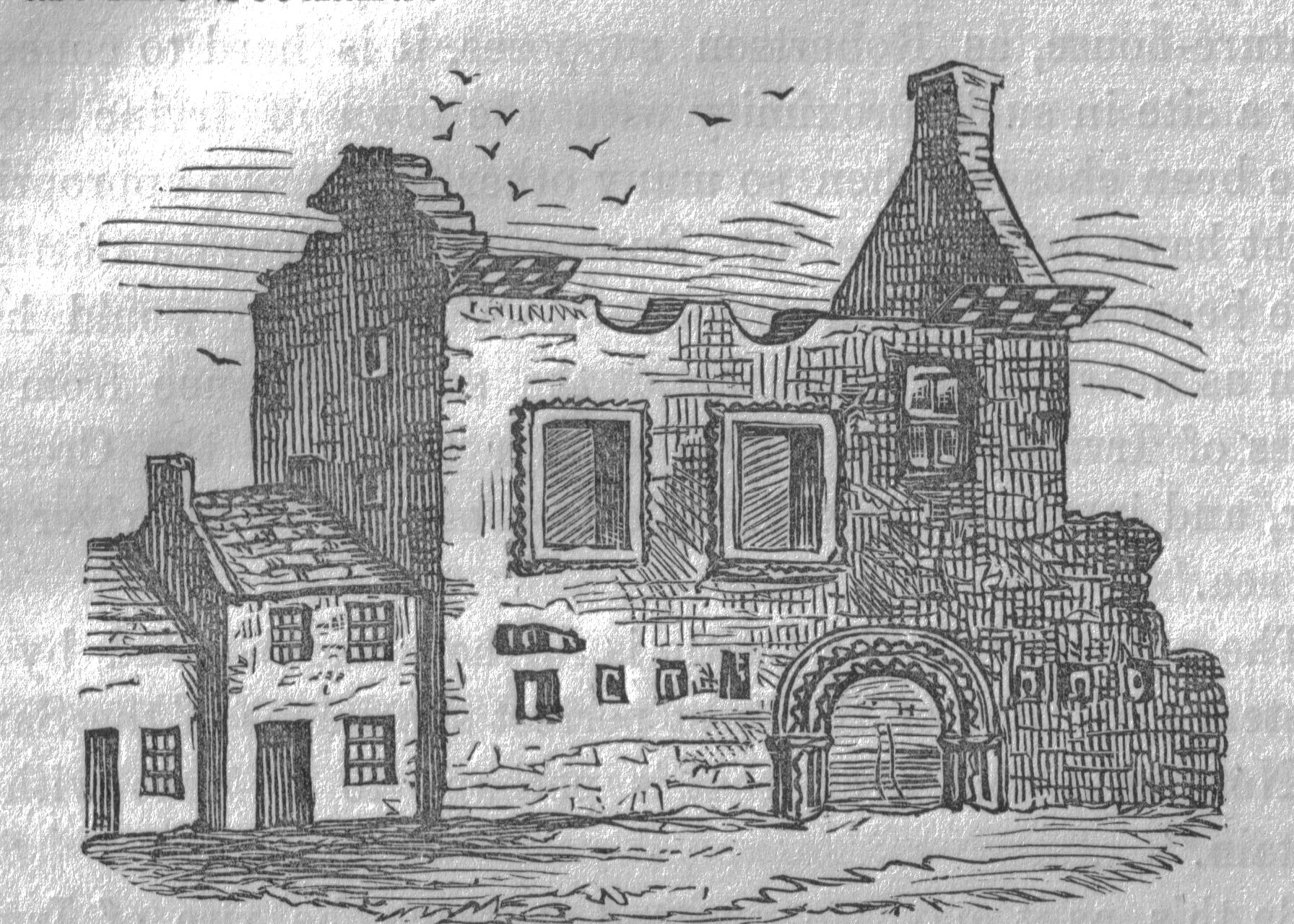
Seagate Castle in the 1850s

Benedict of Peterborough in 1184 records a castle of 'Hirun', which has been taken as referring to Irvine. The original, probably-wooden castle tower or motte, was therefore built some time before 1184, being rebuilt in stone in the 1360s and then remodelled and expanded by Hugh the 3rd Earl of Eglinton, around 1565.

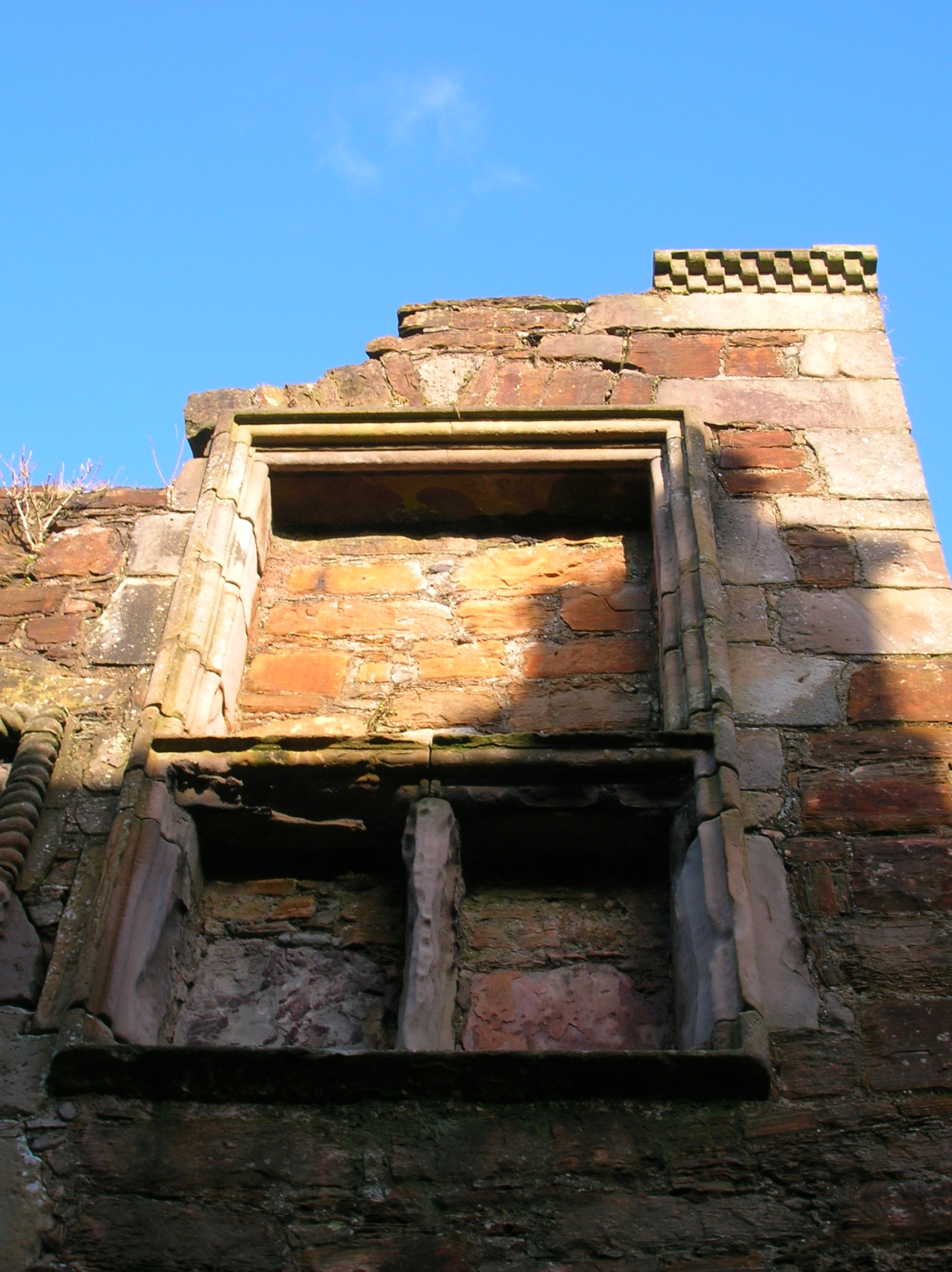
Armorial panelling at the first floor hall level

In the twelfth century the castle of Irvine lay within the lordship of Cunninghame, which had been granted by David I to Hugh de Morville, Lord High Constable of Scotland. In 1196 the lordship passed from the de Morville family, through failure of male heirs, and then descended through various families, among whom were the Balliols. Robert the Bruce granted the lordship to Robert the Steward.

In 1366 the castle passed into the possession of Sir Hugh de Eglintoun, along with the office of chamberlain of Irvine and bailie of the Barony of Cuninghame, granted to him by Robert the Steward, High Steward of Scotland, later Robert II in this year. Sir Hugh, had married the Steward's half-sister, Egidia, by which marriage he had an only child, Elizabeth. Elizabeth de Eglintoun, as sole heiress, married John Montgomerie of Eaglesham, to whom the estates and possessions passed, including the barony of Ardrossan.

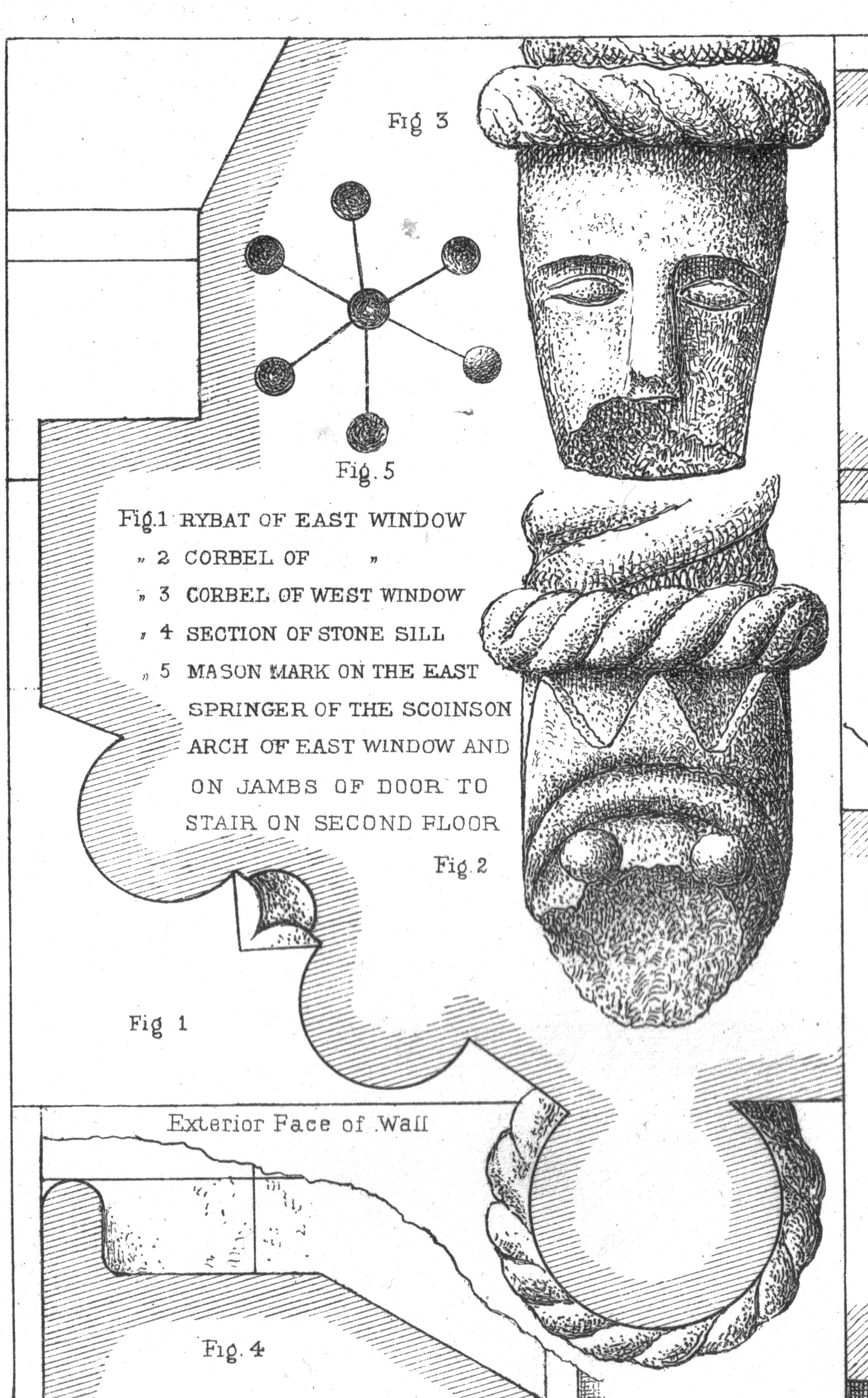
Masons marks, door jambs, face carving, etc. at Seagate Castle

Seagate Castle, probably the third castle in Irvine's historical timeline, is not a typical town lodging, having some of the characteristics of a castle or fortalice, built as a showpiece between 1562–85, in style more a palace, place, or mansion house.

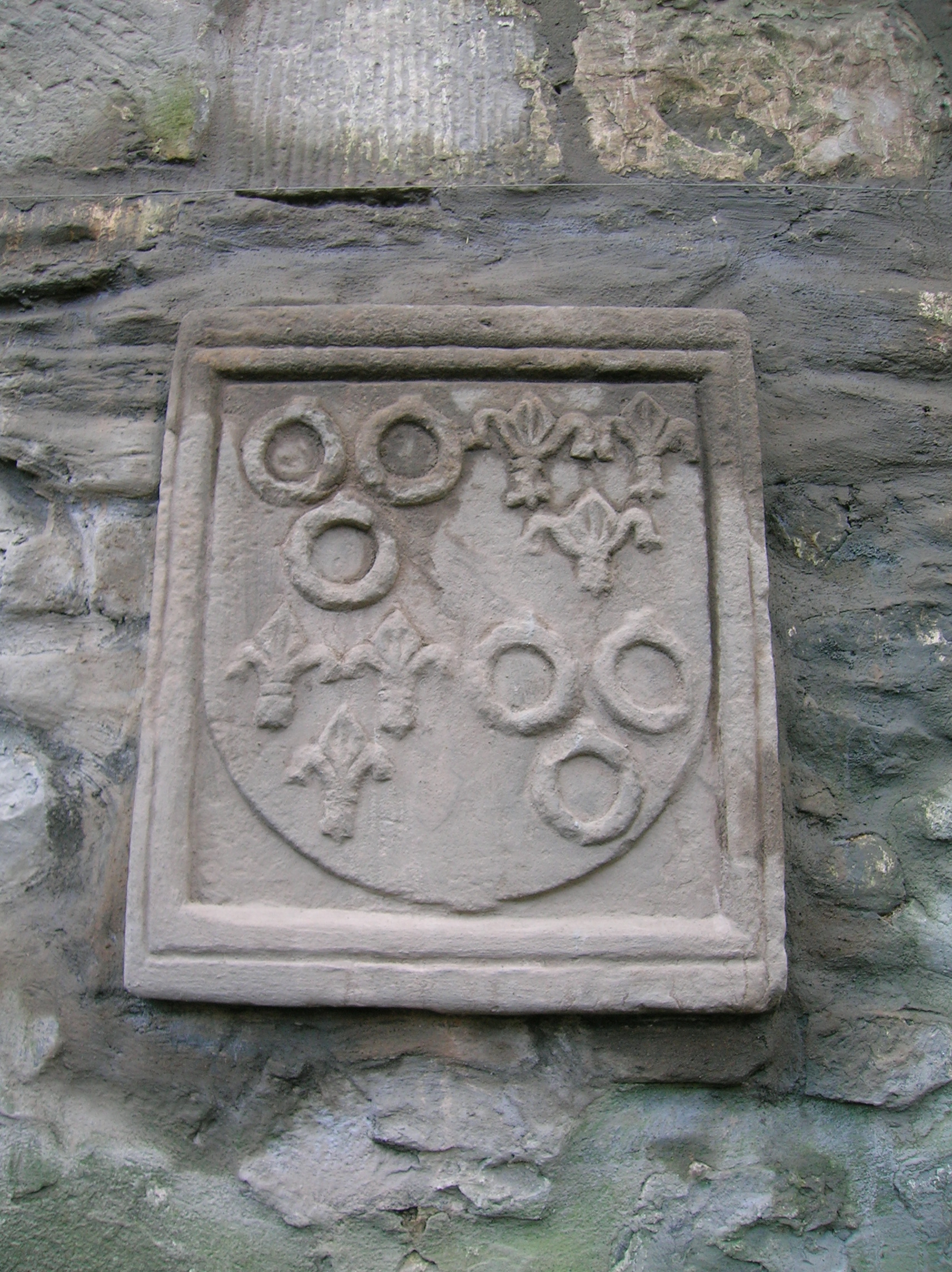
Montgomerie Coat of Arms of the late seventeenth century

The castle is thought by some to incorporate the remnants of the strong twelfth-century castle of 'Irewin', described as being a stronghold of some strength in 1184, however, this has not been verified. The triangular tower in the north-west corner has been suggested as having been part of this earlier castle.

The earliest representation of Seagate Castle was drawn by John Ainslie and is to be found in the Eglinton Estate Book.

In 1945 Seagate Castle was given to the Burgh of Irvine by Mrs. Walker of Castlepark.

Irvine Development Corporation (IDC) funded a trial excavation in October 1992 to locate the medieval castle. It revealed mediaeval deposits to a depth of 2.8m. and a short length of wall, however, no clear dating evidence was unearthed.

The three panelled armorial panel may have carried the full conjoined arms at the top and the standard coat of arms of Montgomerie and Drummond at the bottom.

==== Constables ====
Seagate castle was held by a Constable on behalf of the lord; Irvine muniments records show that Philip de Horssey was constable as son-in-law to Richard de Morville; between 1391 and 1425 the post was held by Thomas de Vauce; in 1428 John de Brakanrig inherited the post through his wife; in 1438 Thomas Spark held the post and sold lands and the post of constable to William Cunningham of Craigends. An annual payment of two merks had been made throughout this time and this ceased with the post's demise in 1596.

==== Architecture ====
The entrance doorway is of the Scottish Renaissance Gothic style, and the building, less defensive and more an elegant mansion, has elegant moulded windows and other ornate embellishments. The castle is entered through a vaulted pend running through the north section of the main block, which has a fine ornamental arched doorway, opening into the courtyard and having similarities with the southern entrance passageway at Linlithgow Palace. A lengthy main block faces the street, to the east of this three towers projected, two were round and one was triangular; probably because of the lie of the land. It has been suggested that this tower is of a much older construction, but other authorities dispute this. A small guardroom and a prison pit may have existed in this area.

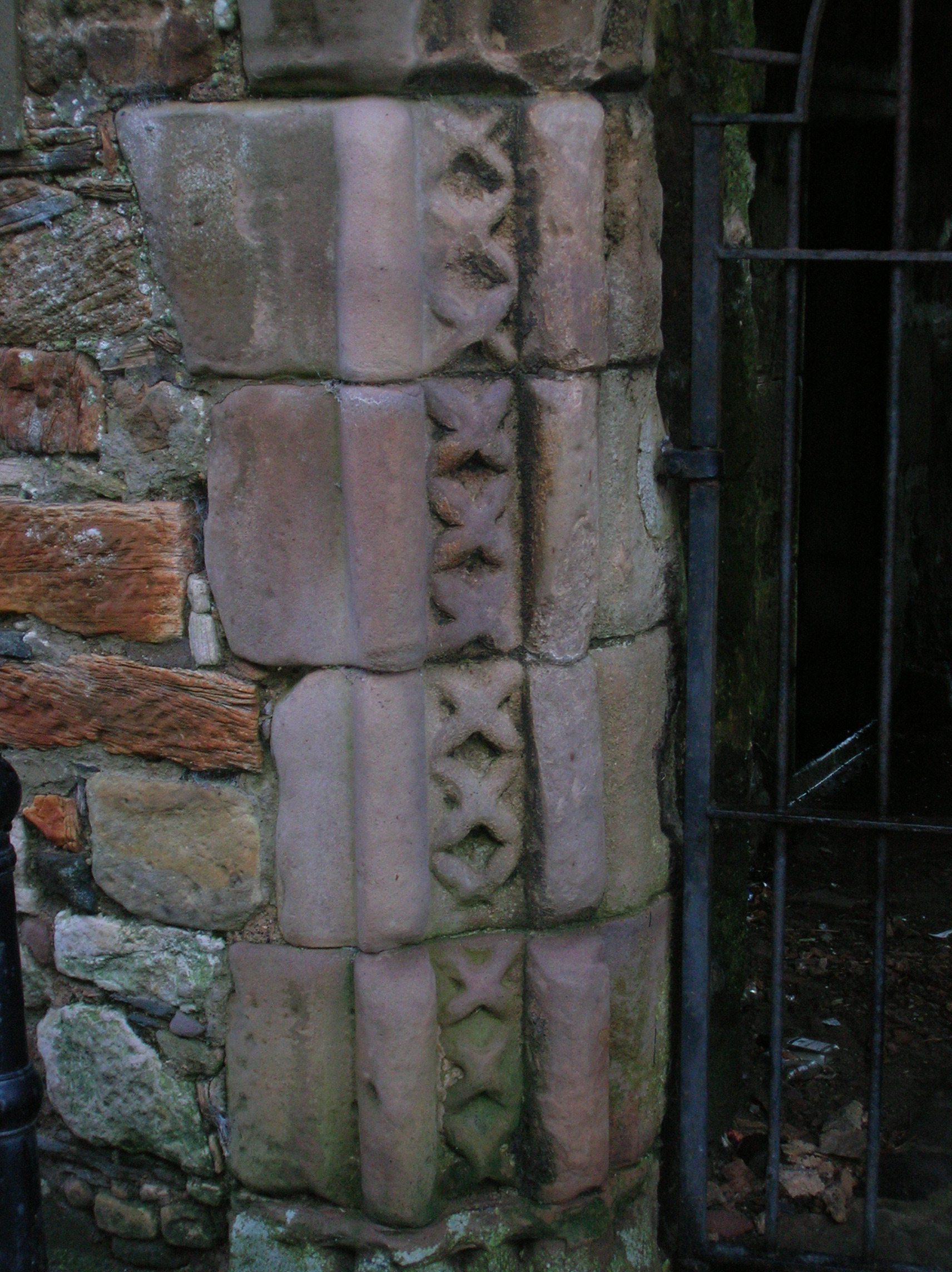
Detail of the entrance doorway

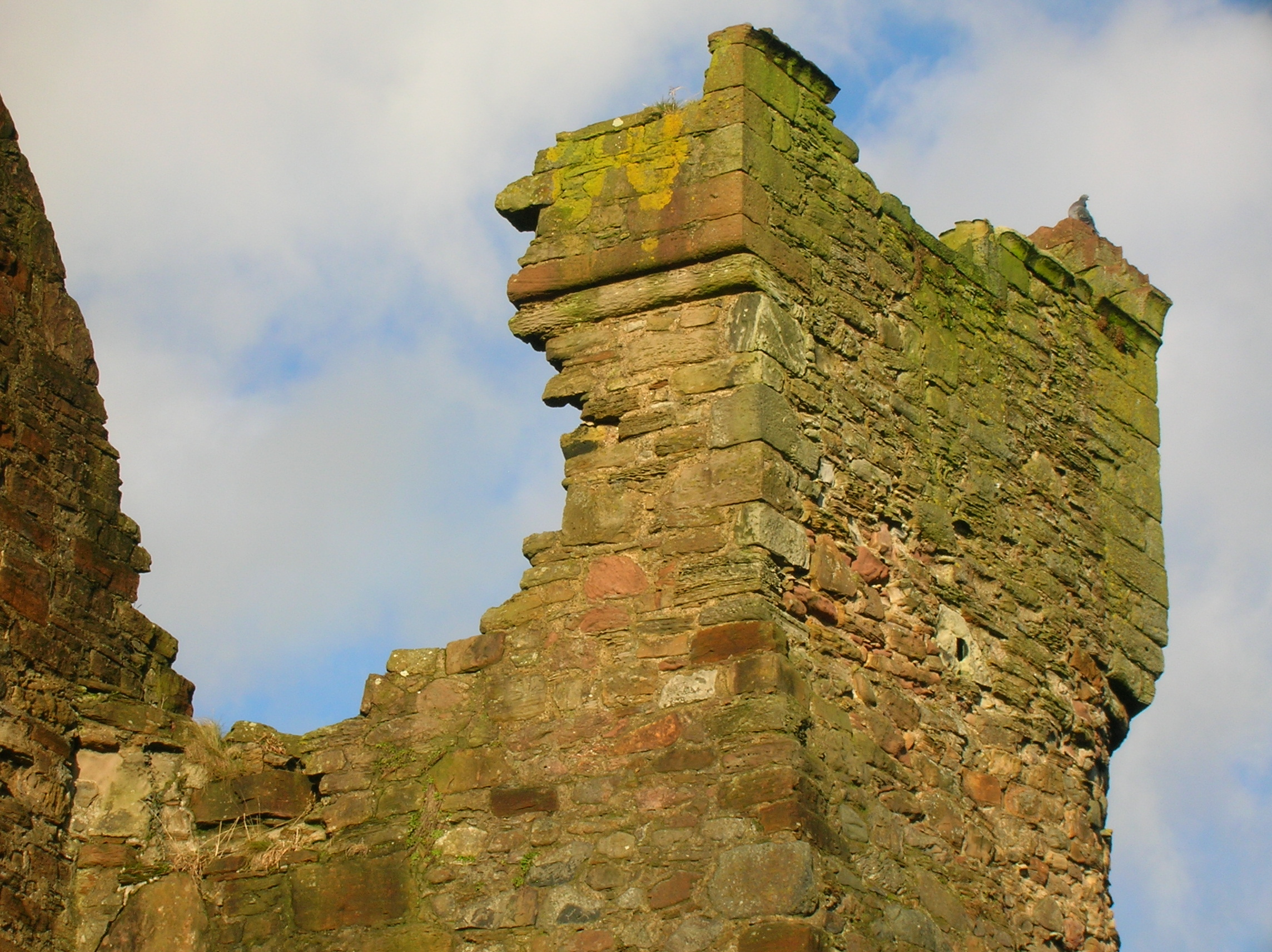
Detail of the old watchtower overlooking the old harbour

The south half of the long main block and one round tower now are reduced to the basement and foundations, but the remainder is fairly entire as far as the wallhead. The courtyard with a curtain wall and subsidiary building existed to the east. The ground floor is fairly complete with vaulted accommodation, with two guard rooms, each having a single door; a typical defensive precaution of the time. The kitchen and fireplace survive, as do the two principal rooms to the south, the southernmost of which was the only room to connect with the upper floor; a private stair leading up from it to what was probably the great hall. The kitchen has an arch, a large window, and aumbries, together with a serving hatch in the adjoining passageway. The upper floors, with their fireplaces and fine moulded windows, were reached via the round tower entered from the courtyard.

The ornate entrance off Seagate has attracted some debate as to its origin, being visually more ecclesiastical than baronial in appearance, variously described as 'Saxon', 'Norman', or 'Scottish Gothic' in style. McGibbon and Ross were of the opinion that the doorway is quite typical of sixteenth and seventeenth century Scottish Renaissance Gothic work as found in several collegiate and parish churches and not necessarily Norman in origin. Kilwinning Abbey was being sacked and progressively demolished at this time and stonework may have been removed to build this doorway and also used for the building of the rest of the structure. The Romanesque mouldings at Seagate have been compared with similar work, circa 1573, found at Blairquhan (old) Castle, possibly Maybole, and several other West of Scotland castles.

A cesspool was conveniently, but unhygienically located just outside the back door of the kitchen in the courtyard, with a channel running to it from the fireplace. Other pipes linked to this channel from garderobes upstairs. A good number of different mason's marks are located on the stonework in the entrance pend and elsewhere. The building may have been harled, a form of roughcast.

==== Smugglers and destruction ====
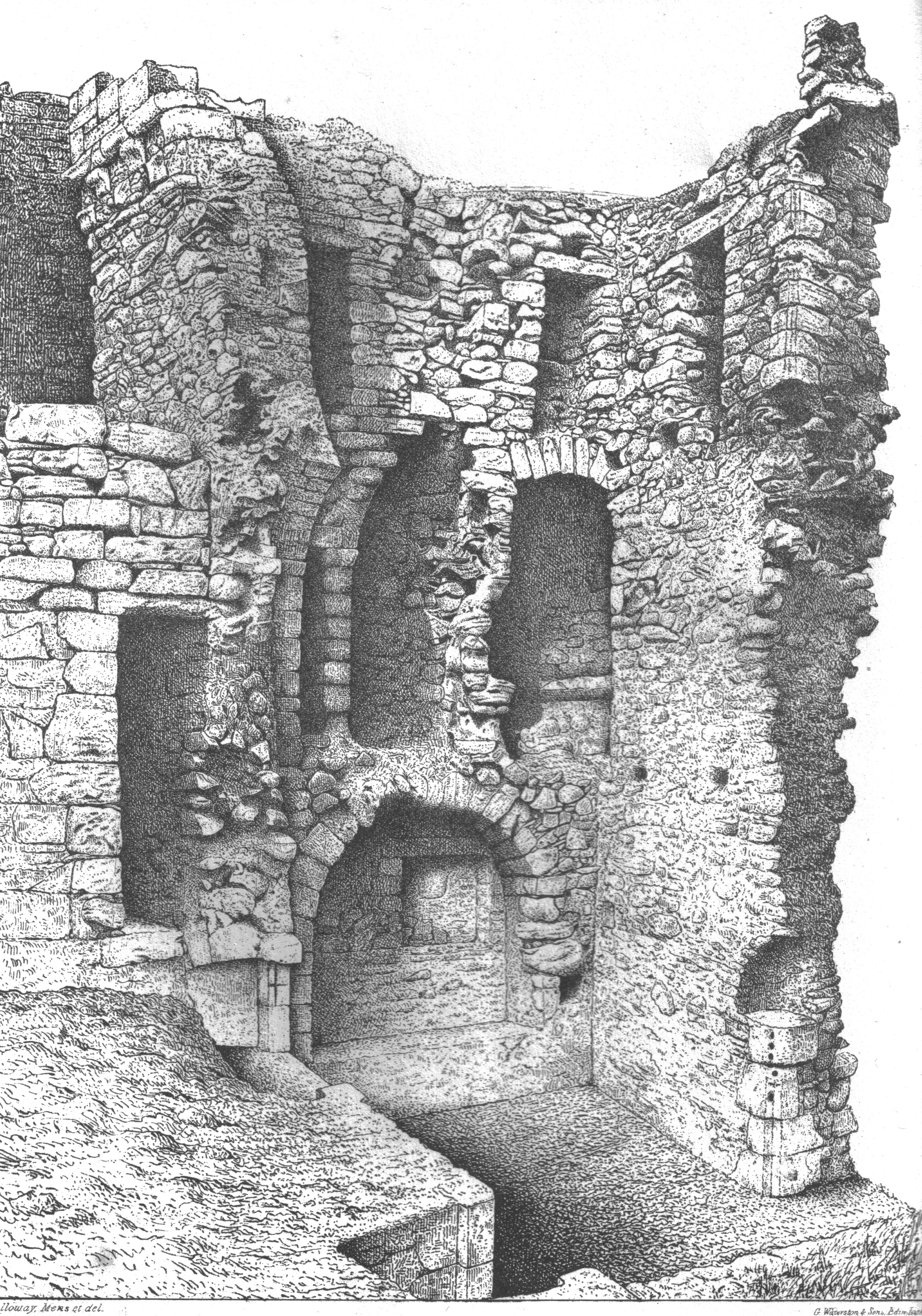
Interior of the 'ancient tower'

After being unroofed in around 1746, Seagate ceased to be inhabited by family retainers, however, the Castle became the haunt of smugglers, thieves and beggars. After nightfall the locals shunned it, and if any property was stolen in the town it was the first place to be searched. In the 1800s people still living could remember seeing the smugglers' " wee still " sitting in the large kitchen fireplace producing illicit spirits.

Locals extensively quarried the building for their own purposes, however in 1810, Earl Hugh (the 12th Earl) made extensive repairs to the building, blocking up the windows, doors, etc. In 1839 a great storm caused considerable collapse of stones into the courtyard. When inspected in 1883 the vaults, kitchen, and other apartments, were found full of rubble, soil, and rubbish of all kinds, much of which was the refuse chiefly of adjoining properties. The Earl of Eglinton had this all removed, which took about a month, the debris being buried in the Low Green.

In 2010 the building, although still roofless and ruinous, exhibits the high status of its former status as a town house; council minutes record that some restoration works were carried out by Enterprise Ayrshire in the 1990s, the town council having had some repairs carried out in 1971.

== The Montgomeries ==
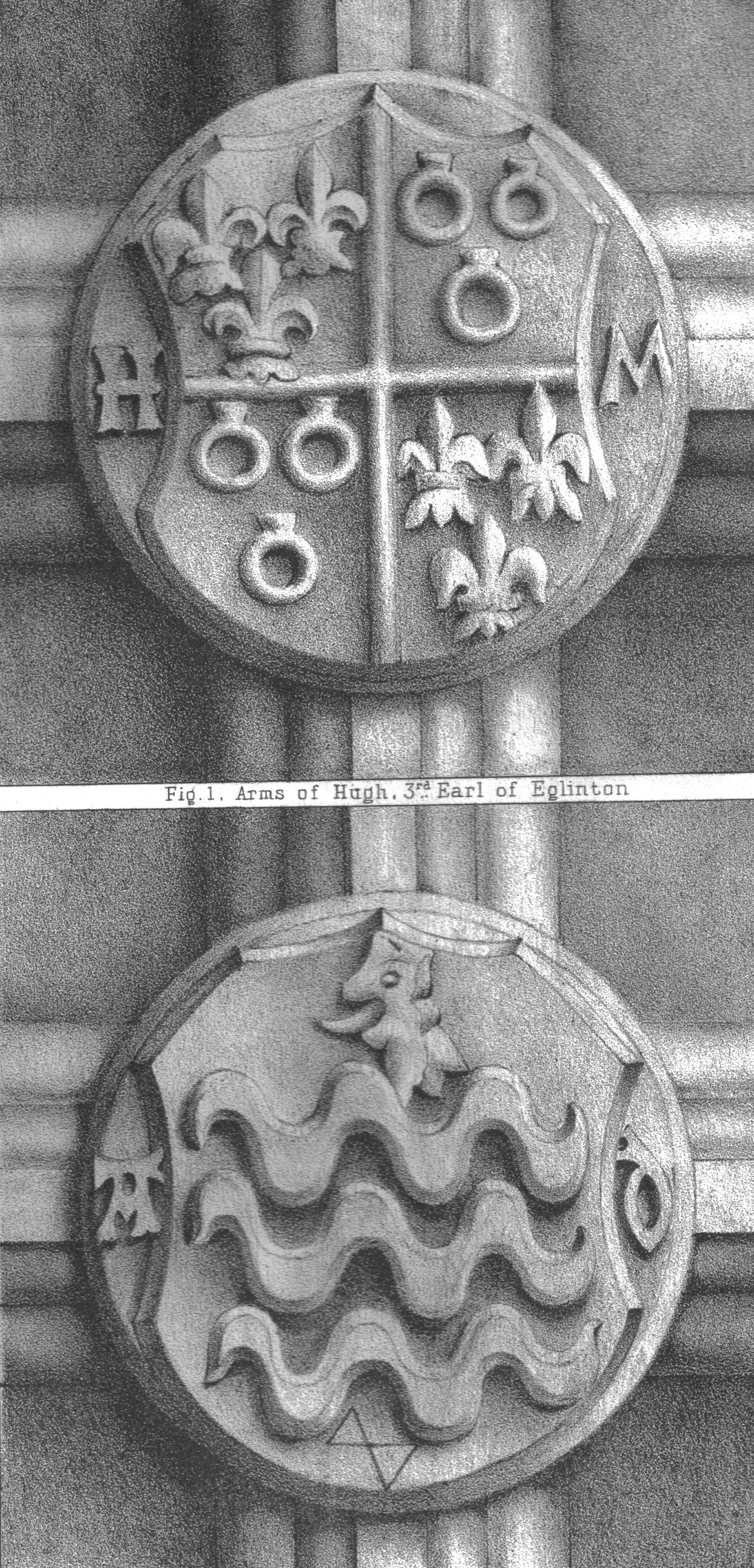
The coat of arms of the Montgomerie and Drummond families

The Montgomerie family may have built the castle as their town house and as a jointure house for the dowager countesses. The coat of arms of one owner, probably the builder, Hugh Montgomerie, 3rd Earl of Eglinton, are on a roof boss in the entrance pend, together with his 'HM' initials and the arms of his wife, Agnes Drummond, with 'AD' incised; he married her in 1562. Sir Hugh he died in 1585.

Love gives Hugh's wife's name as Margaret Drummond of Innerpeffray; however, a Dame Agnes Drummond (Lady Loudoun) was the daughter of Sir John Drummond of Innerpeffray and widow of Sir Hugh Campbell of Loudoun. Hugh had previously married, Lady Jean Hamilton, a daughter of the Earl of Arran, however, this ended in a divorce in 1562.

Over the centuries Seagate Castle, the Garden, or Easter Chambers in Kilwinning, Kilmaurs House, Auchans Castle, and Redburn House all have been used as dower houses by the family.

=== Abandonment ===
Seagate Castle was inhabited until approximately 1746 when its roof was removed by the Alexander Montgomerie, 10th Earl of Eglinton (1723–1769) and used in the construction of a new church in Ardrossan parish that the earl was building; Pocoke on his journeys through Scotland in 1760, visited Irvine and described the castle as ruinous.

== Mary Queen of Scots and Marymass ==
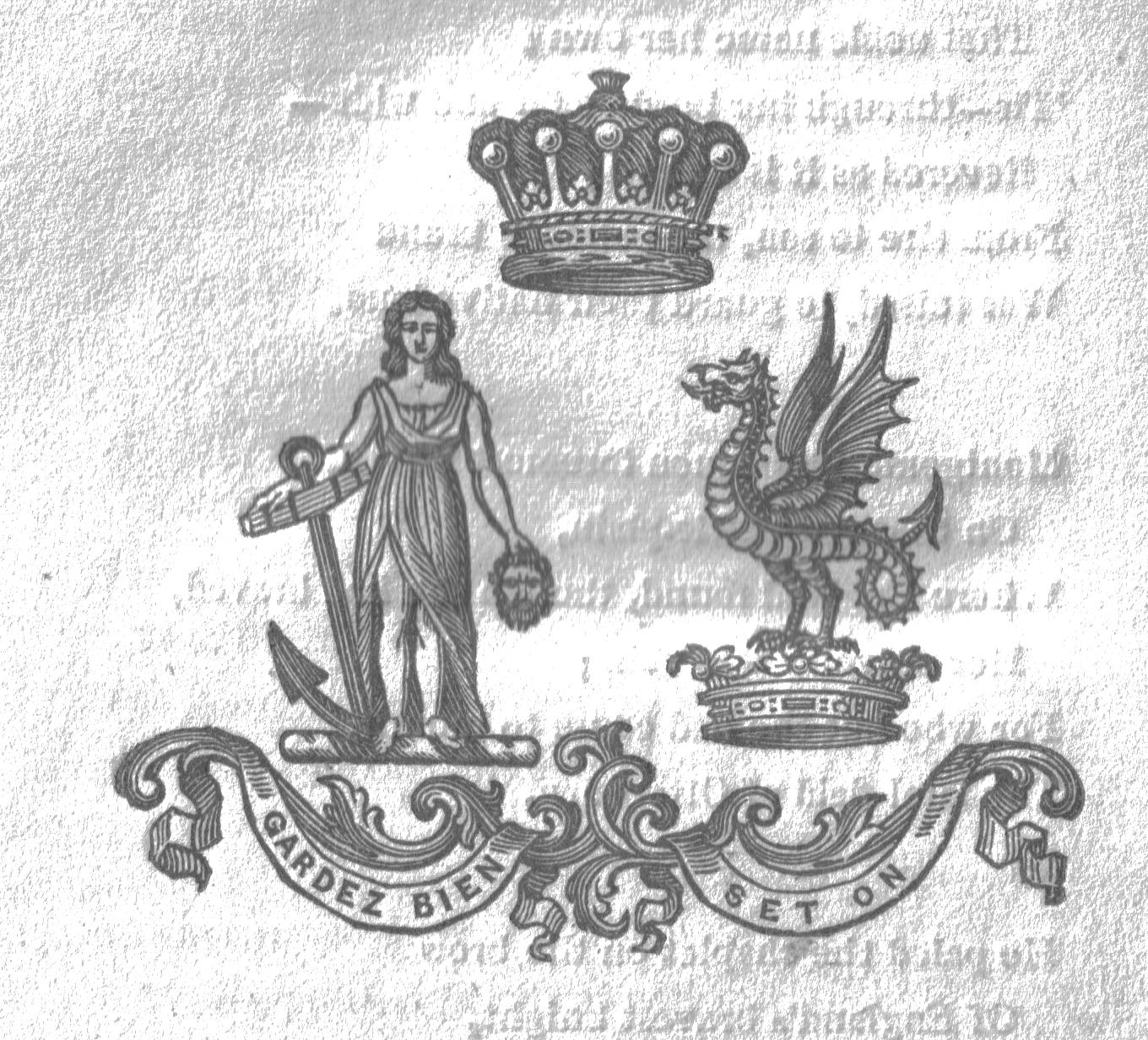
Lady Mary of Eglinton on the Montgomerie family crest

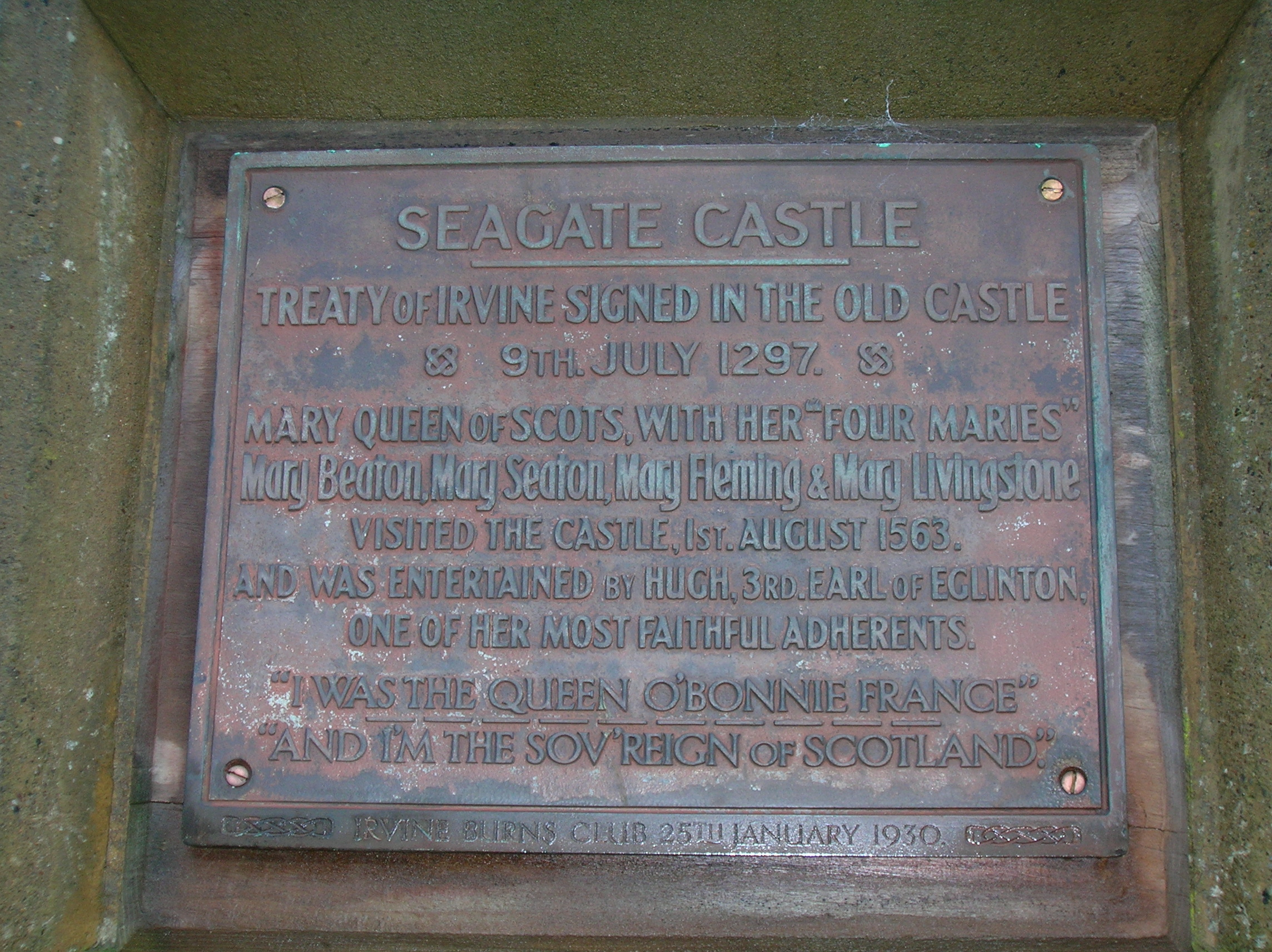
The commemorative plaque on the castle wall

It is recorded on the plaque at the entrance that Mary, Queen of Scots, stayed at the castle in 1563. The 3rd earl was a great supporter and he is said to have entertained the queen and her four Marys; Mary Seton; Mary Beaton; Mary Fleming; and Mary Livingston at the castle. This visit to the castle is said to be the origin of the town’s Marymass celebrations, held in August of each year; however, it is more likely that Marymass has its origins in the dedication of the church to the Blessed Virgin Mary whose festival of Assumption is on 15 August. Saint Inan's festival was on 18 August. It has even been suggested that the festival was named after Lady Mary of Eglinton, from the family crest, who decapitated a Viking who had tried to kidnap her. This one of several versions of the story.

In the 1880s at the Marymass Fair, the carters, freemasons, and others on their return from the parade on the racecourse, came back via the Seagate, stopped and arranged themselves in front of the old Castle to sing " Auld Lang Syne." The Carter's continue that tradition to this day.

== Treaty of Irvine ==
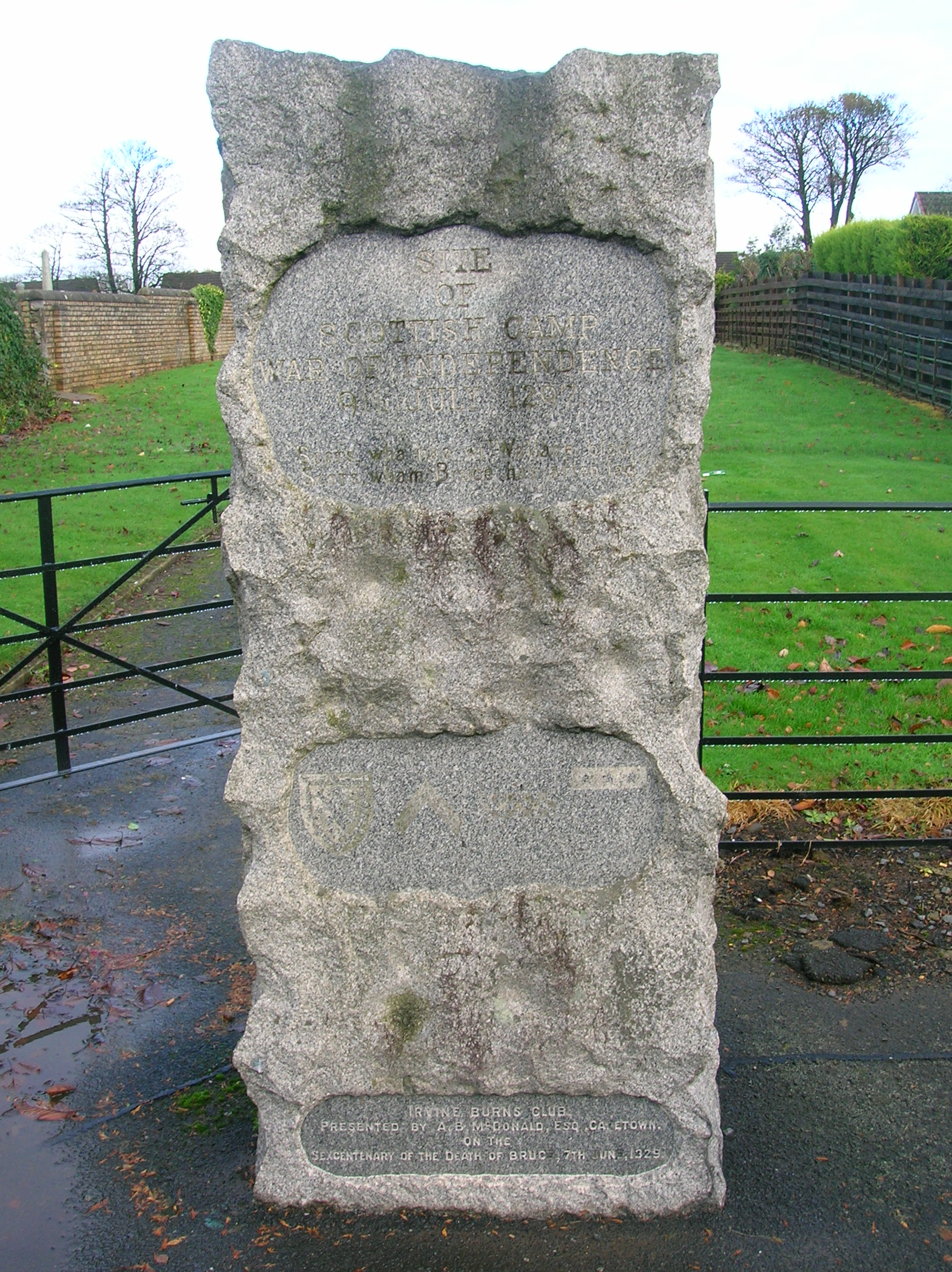
The memorial to the Scottish Army Campsite at Knadgerhill; a battle that never happened

The castle information plaque records that the 'Treaty of Irvine' between Scotland and England was signed at Seagate Castle on 9 July 1297; this would have been in the earlier castle. In 1297 Edward I had sent a punitive expedition under Sir Henry Percy to Irvine to quash an armed uprising against his dethronement of John Balliol. The Earl of Carrick, Robert Bruce, Bishop Wishart and others led the Scottish army, however, after much argument they decided to submit without a fight. The armies had been encamped in sight of each other, the English at Tarryholme and the Scots at Knadgerhill, with the old Trindlemoss or Scotts Loch between them. Rodolph de Eglinton is said to have hosted the negotiations at Seagate Castle. The Bruce never accepted the surrender conditions and Edward I did not confirm it.

The story became embellished with a purely fanciful involvement of William Wallace in a brave action here. The original treaty survives and is to be found in the Public Record Office, London. Through this treaty certain of the Scottish leaders submitted to the English; the treaty also is known as the 'Capitulation of Irvine'.

== Major General Robert Montgomerie ==
Robert Montgomerie was a son of the sixth Earl and lived in Irvine, probably at the Seagate Castle townhouse. In February 1682 an odd case of witchcraft occurred in the general's household. An Irish serving-maid was accused of stealing some silverware, however, she declared herself to be innocent and in a fit of anger offered to raise the Devil, who would reveal the identity of the real thief. She was not taken seriously, however, she set about this task, entering the cellar and drawing a circle around herself and performing a complex ritual with a Bible, riddle, and a black cock's feathers. The result was that she conjured up the Devil and obtained the details of the theft. The silverware was duly located, however, the General reported her to the authorities who imprisoned her in the Irvine tolbooth.

She admitted having learnt the ritual from a Dr. Colvin in Ireland, a man skilled in the use of medicinal herbs and incantations. Her ultimate fate is not recorded. Whilst the ritual was being performed the general and his wife had been struck with an inexplicable sense terror and the dogs of the town had been barking in fear.

Views of Seagate Castle

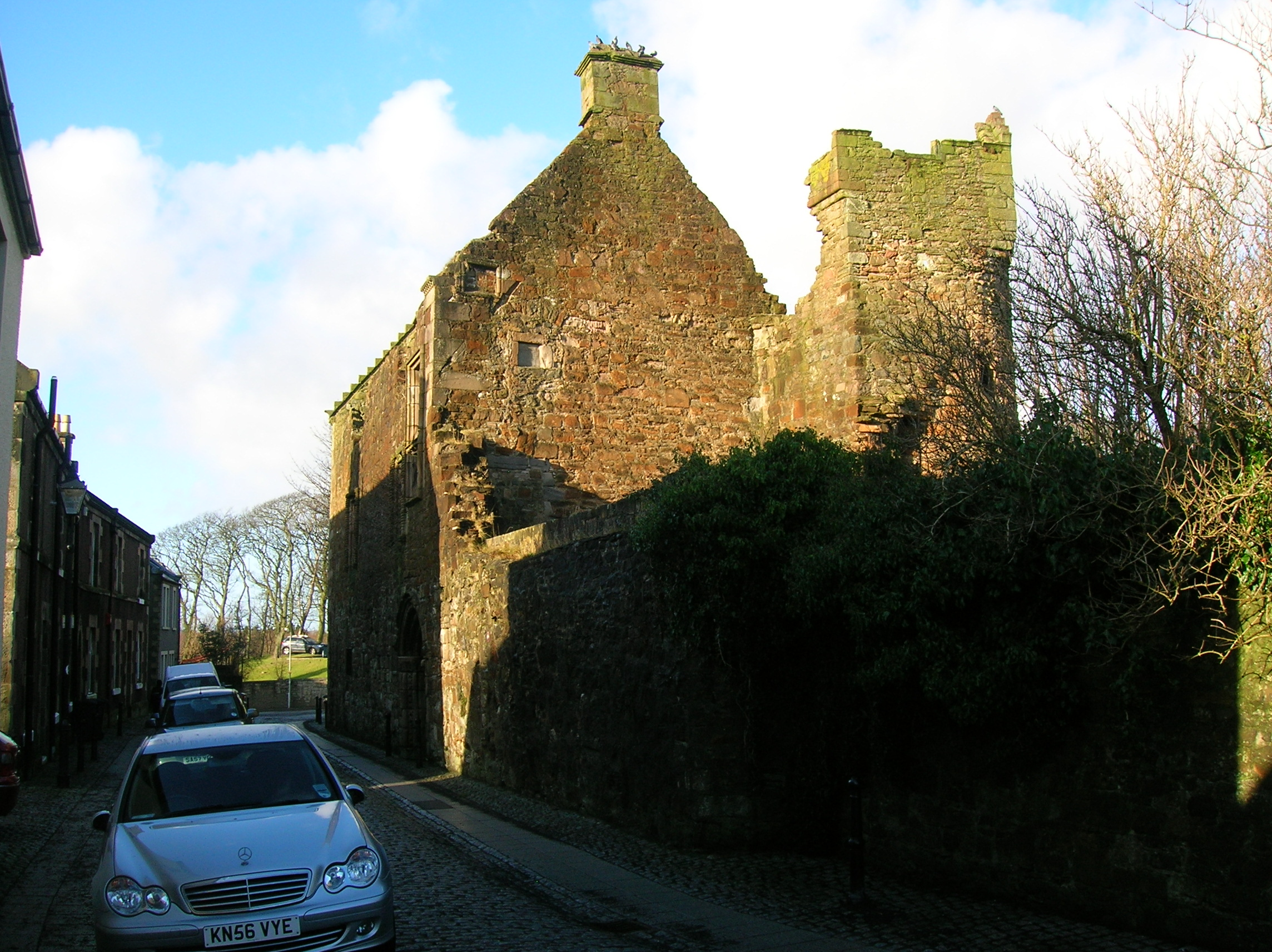
The castle from the East

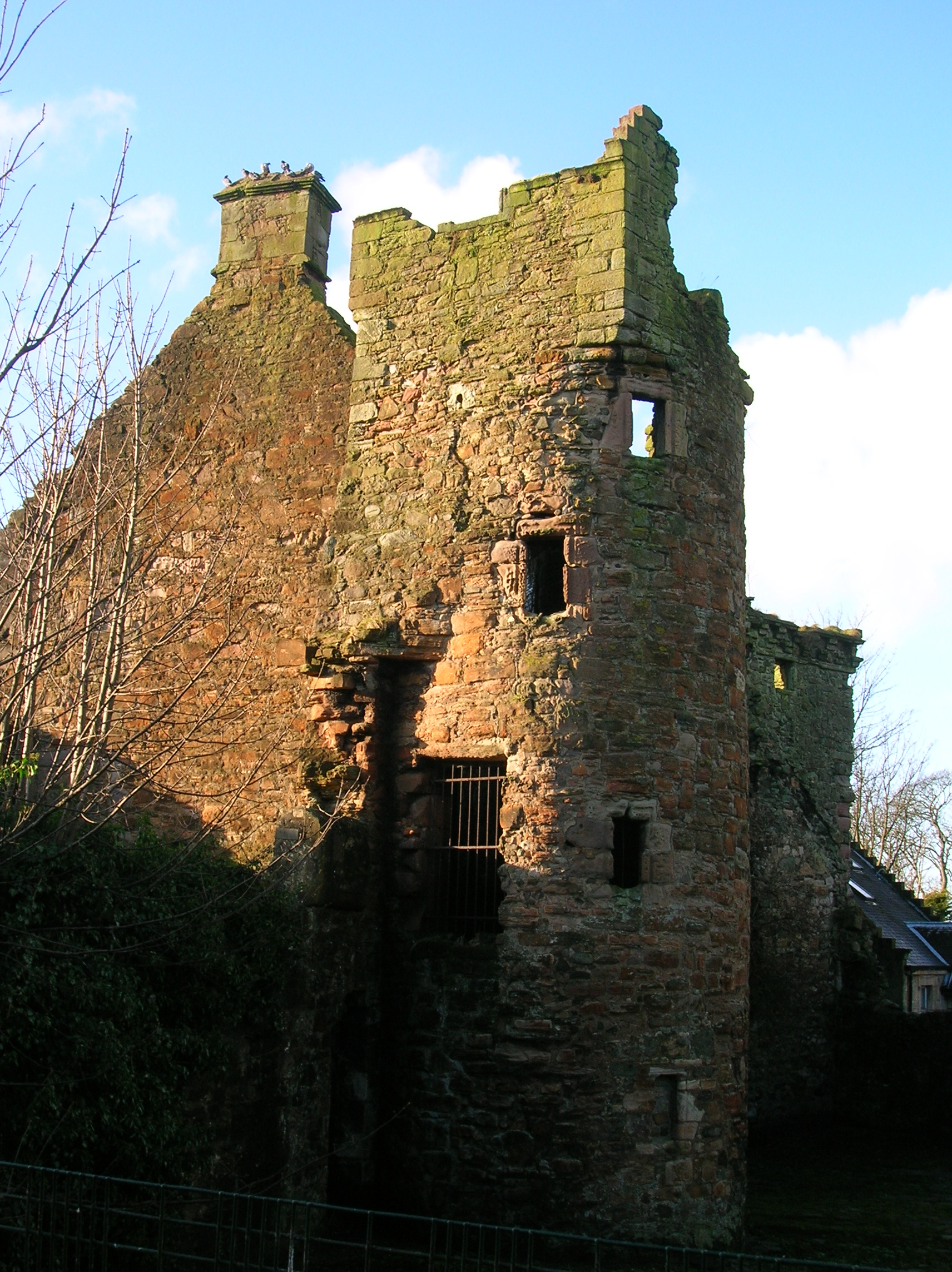
A view from the North

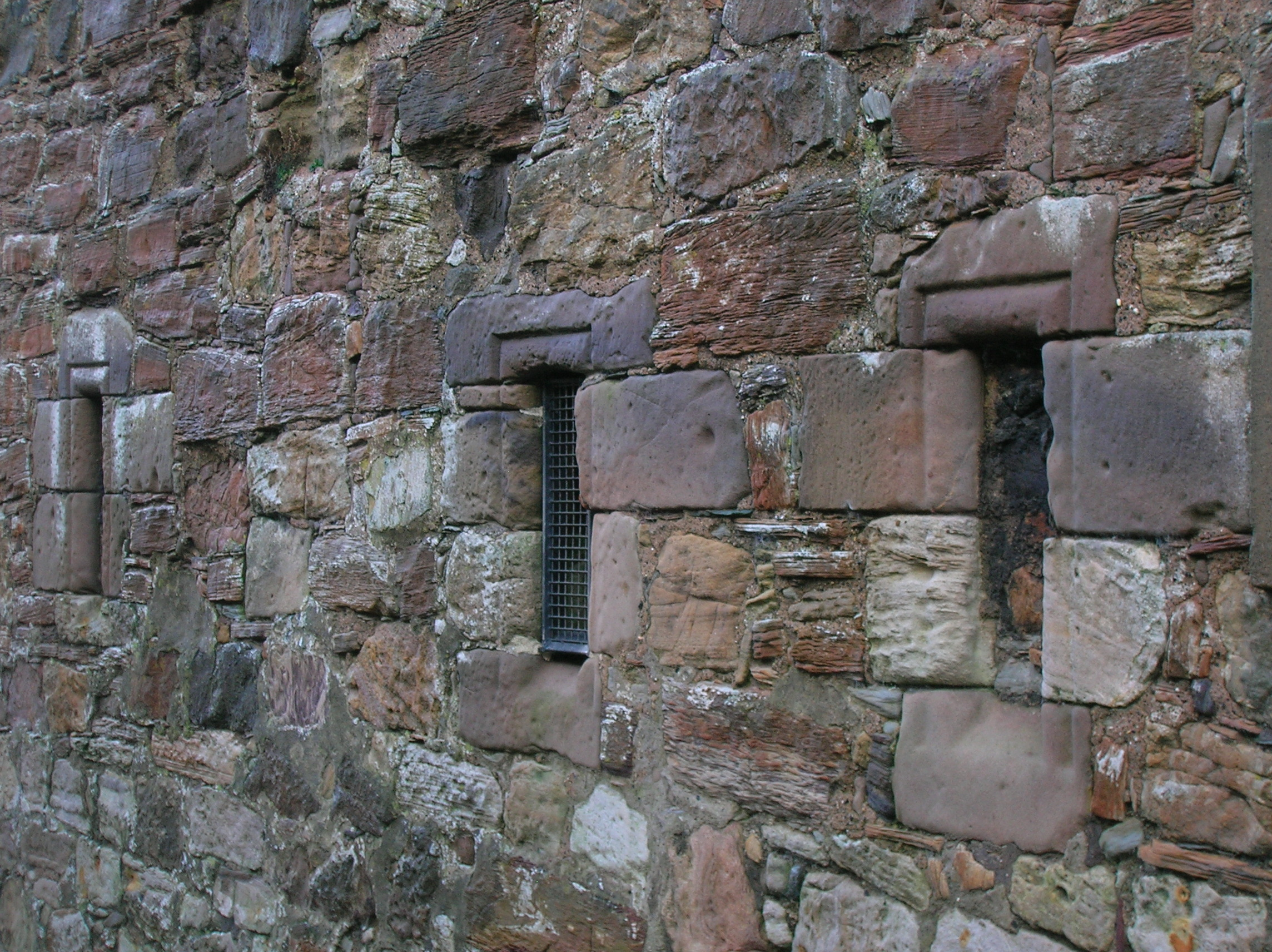
Windows looking onto Seagate

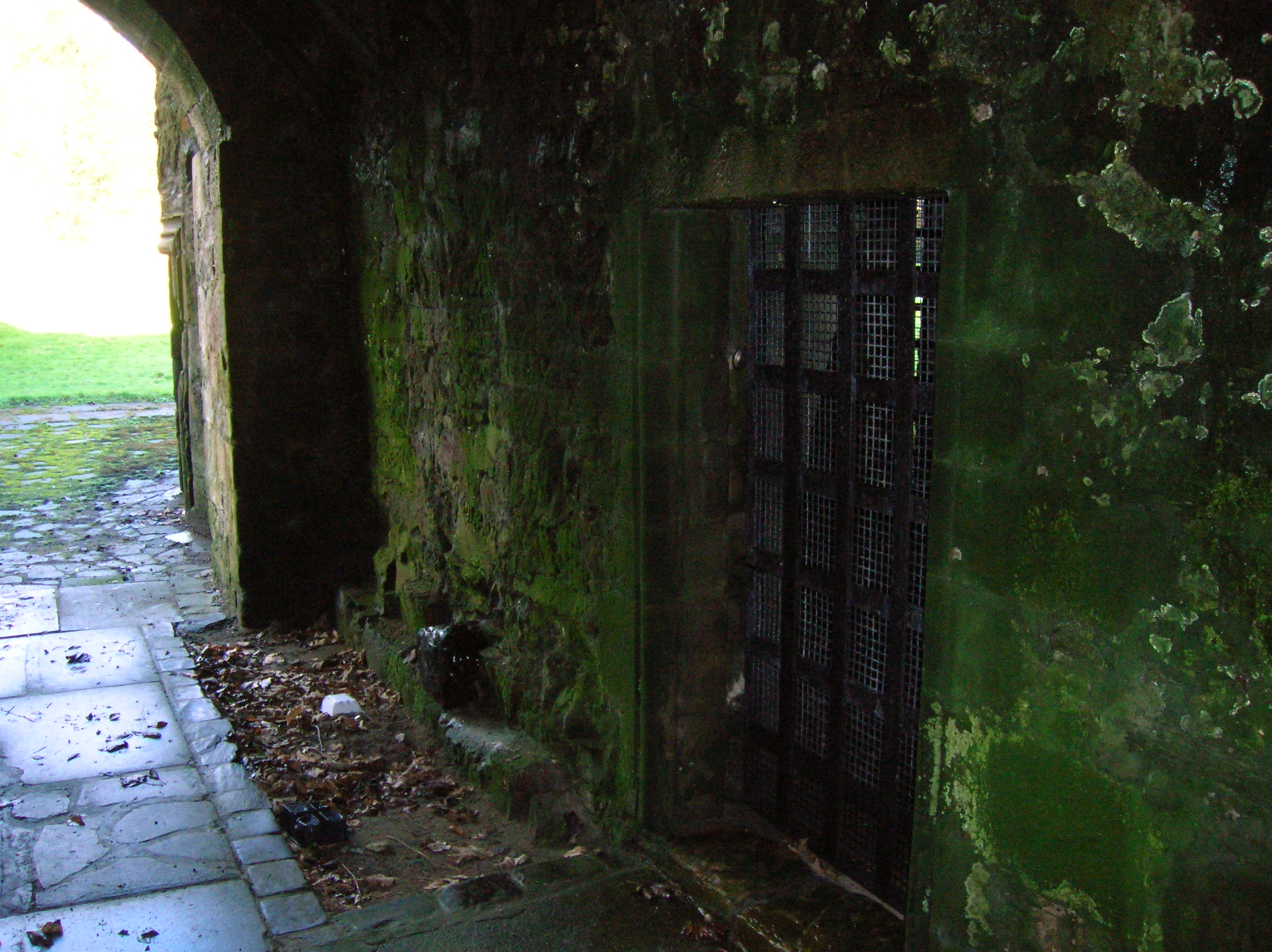
The East guardroom

== Micro-history ==
Seagate was found to be in danger of partial collapse in 2010 and in 2011 North Ayrshire Council carried out repair works to consolidate the structure of the castle.

George Gemmell of Craigfoot was a notable royalist prosecutor of the Covenanters; he is said to have lived at Seagate Castle in the seventeenth century.

The Earls of Eglinton also had a house called Castlepark in Eglinton Street.

Ley tunnels are said to run from Seagate Castle to Stanecastle and to Dundonald Castle.

In 1859 the crowds at the Robert Burns Centenary celebrations had sung 'Auld Lang Syne' outside the castle walls.

== Castle details from 1890 ==
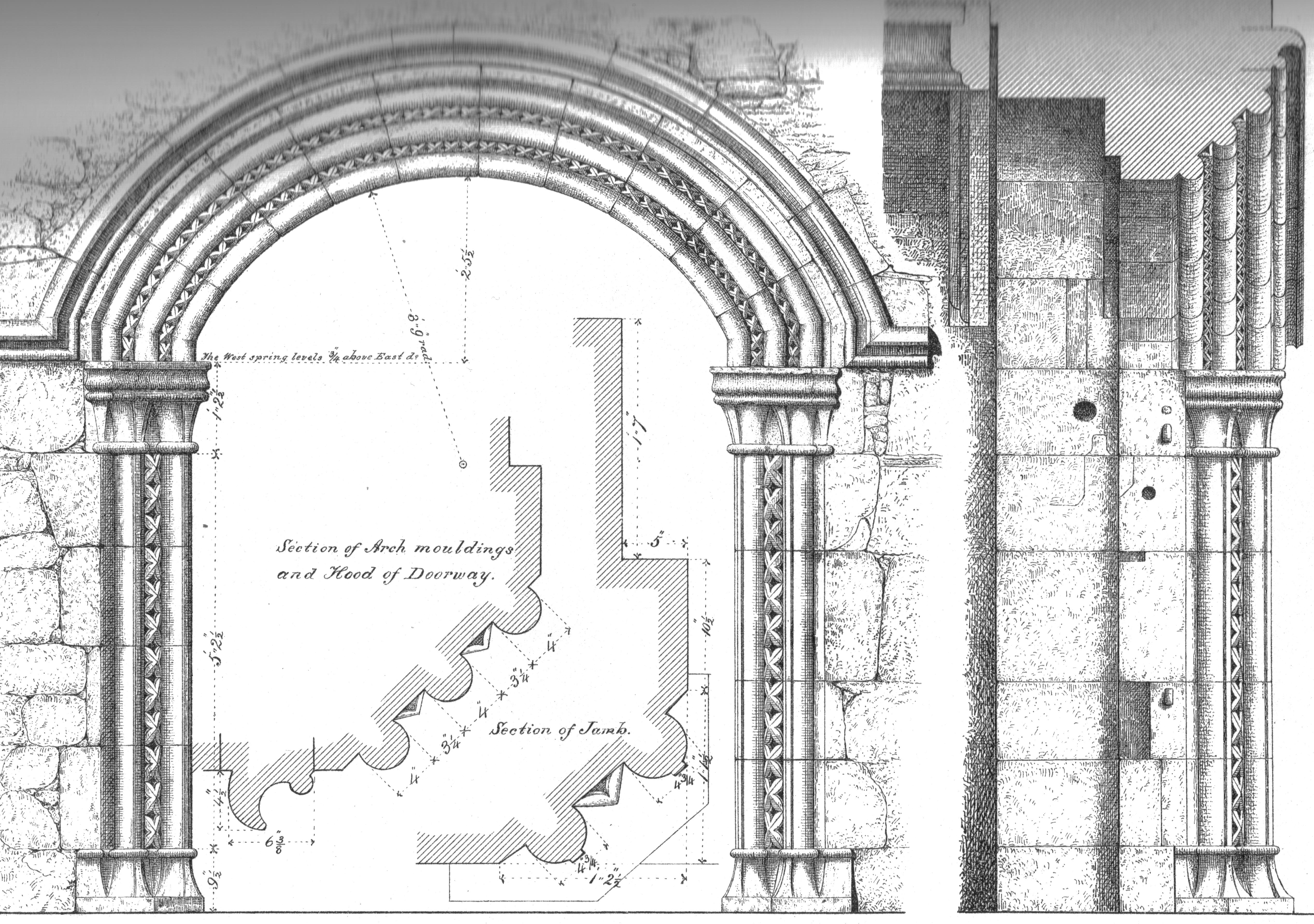
The Seagate Castle entrance doorway

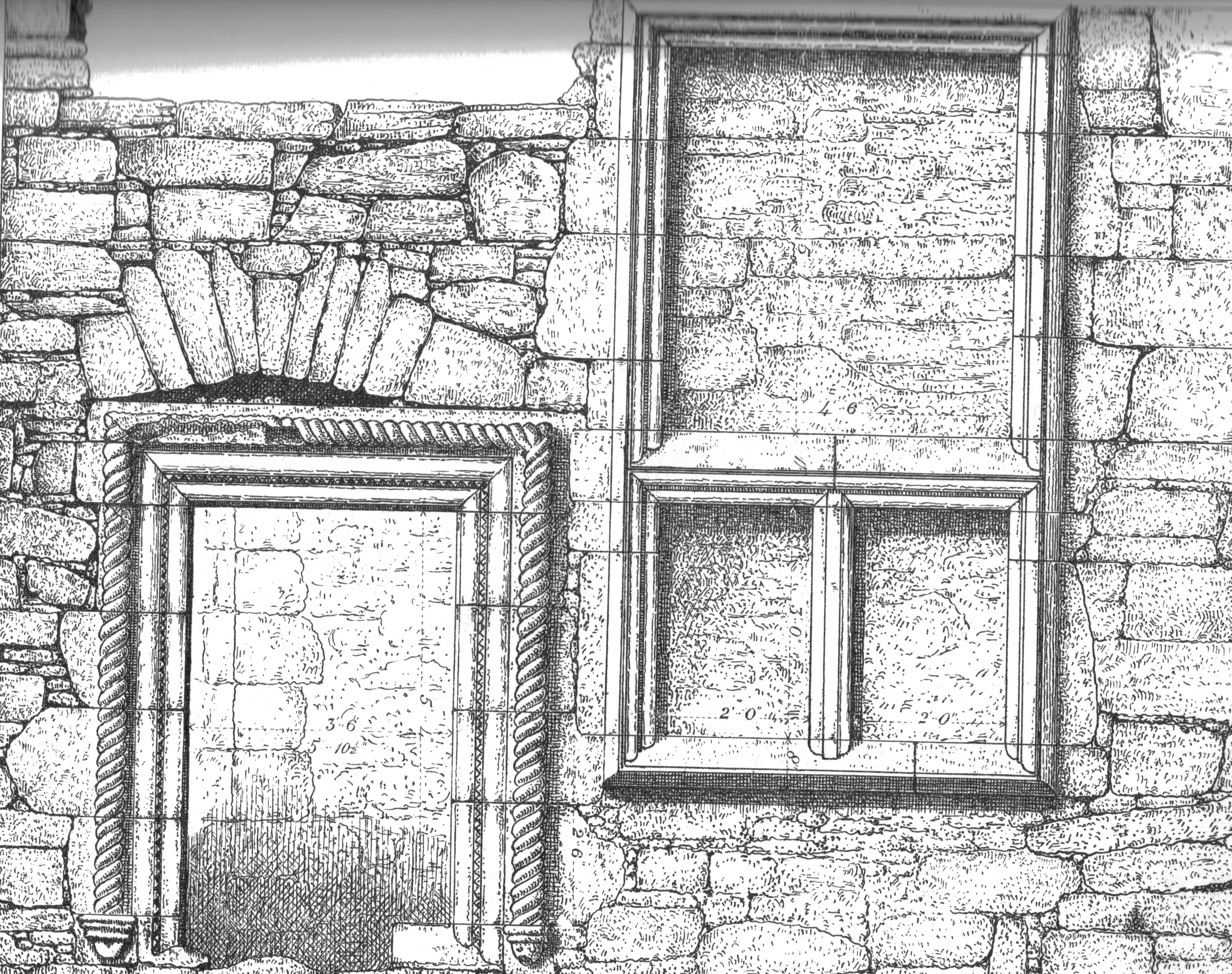
Window and armorial panelling over the entrance doorway

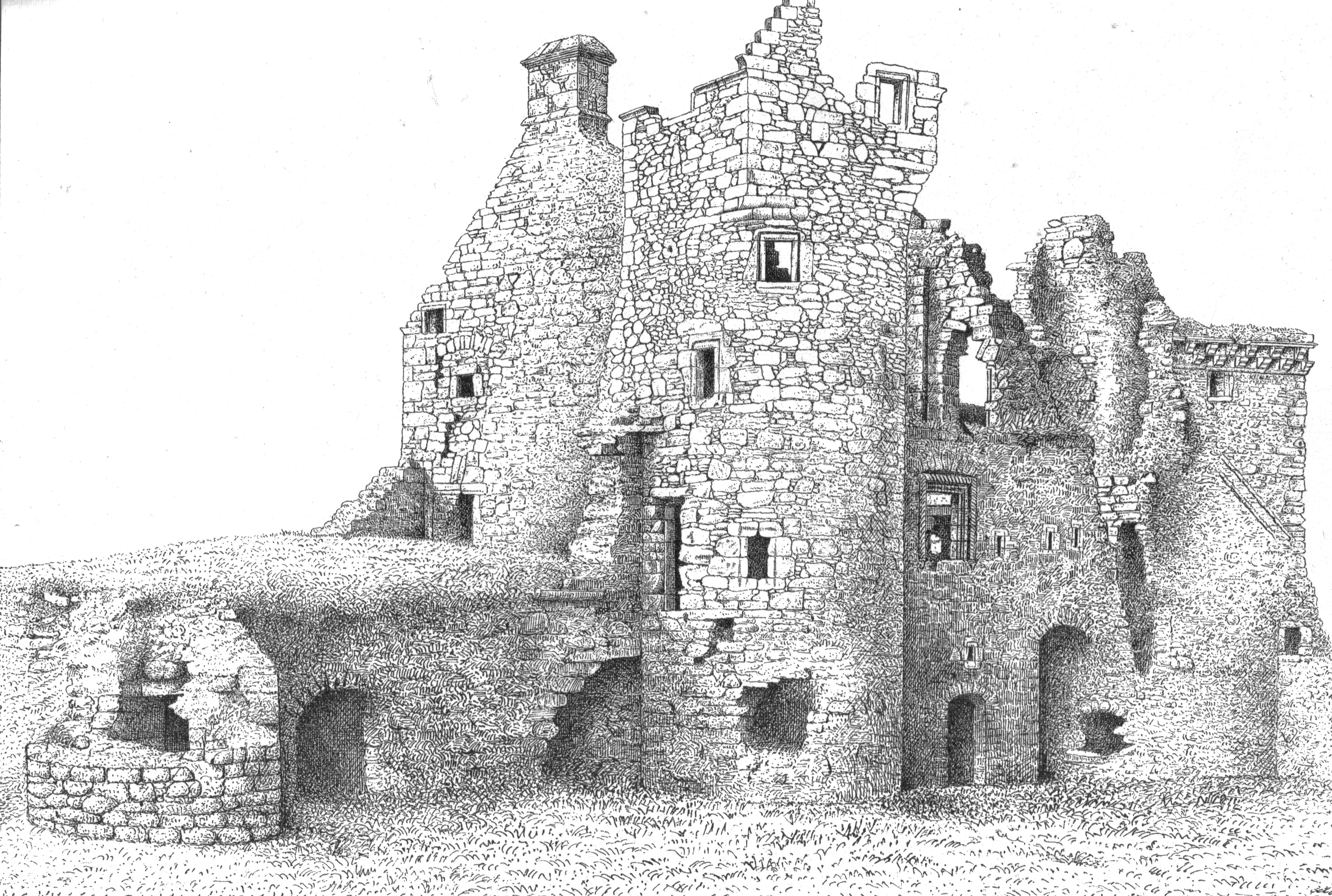
Seagate Castle from the north-east

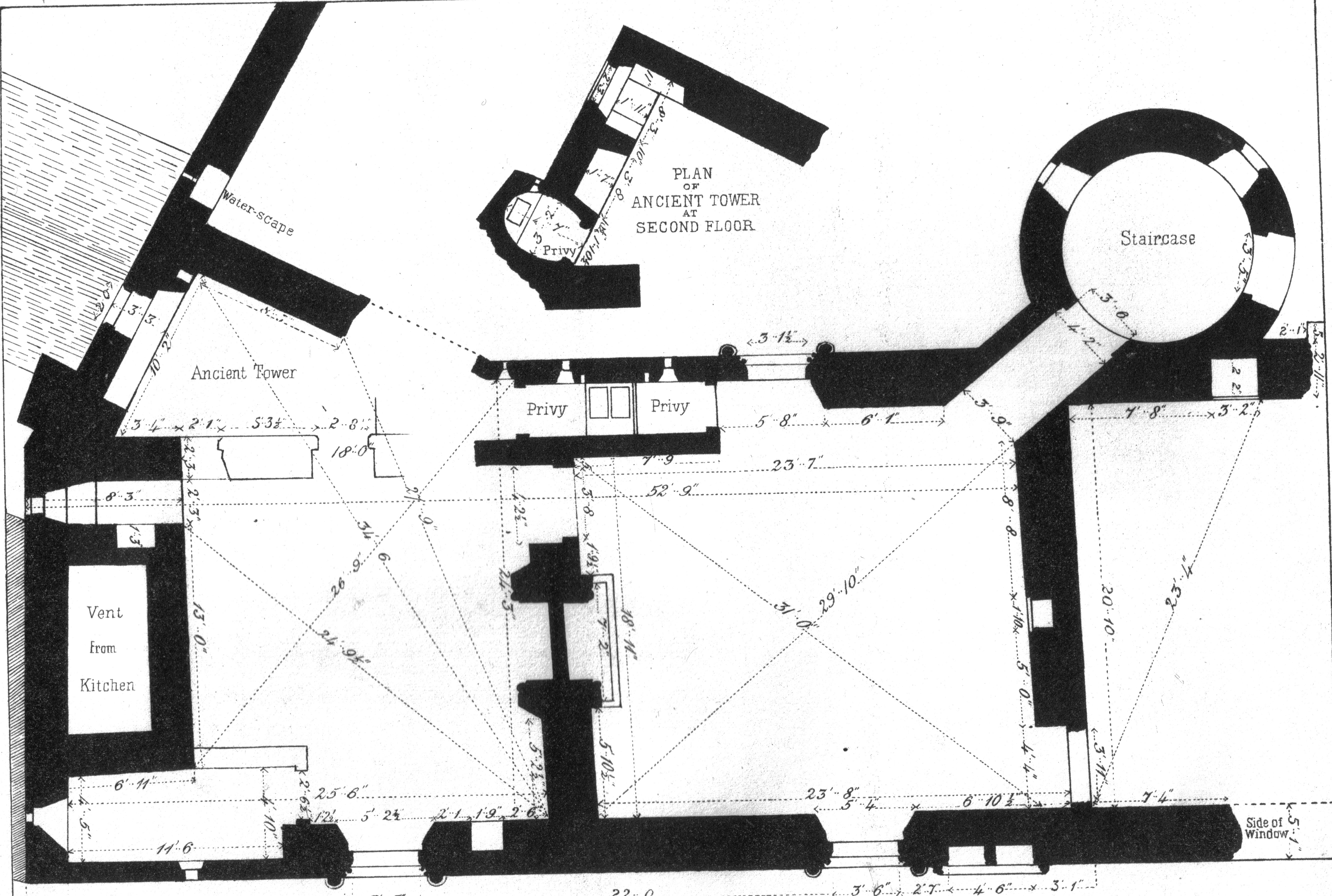
Seagate's first floor plan
