= Nuala Nic Con Iomaire =

Nuala Nic Con Iomaire (died 16 July 2010) was an Irish playwright, producer, translator, artist and poet.

A native of An Cheathrú Rua Connemara, County Galway, Nic Con Iomaire was a daughter of Liam and Bairbre Mac Con Iomaire. She was married to Pádraic Harvey, with whom she had a daughter, Iseult.

Nic Con Iomaire wrote two plays, An tUisceadán (Andrews Lane Theatre), and Páid (a radio play). Best known as a producer, she also worked as arts officer with An Béal Binn, a theatre company and a singing club in Bray, Co. Wicklow.

== See also ==
- Mac Con Iomaire
