= Tomás Mac Con Iomaire =

- Occupations: Radio producer; journalist

Tomás Mac Con Iomaire, Irish radio producer and journalist.

== Biography ==
A native of Casla, Connemara, County Galway, Mac Con Iomaire worked with Raidió na Gaeltachta for over 30 years. During this time he was also one of the pioneers of local news in the west of Ireland. After a few failed attempts to break into the Irish press, in 1974 he became was one of three people selected by Raidió na Gaeltachta to set up a local news service in Connemara.

In 2000, he became the first Galwegian to become Director of the Raidió na Gaeltachta. Six years later, he left the position to return to broadcasting. Since then, he has produced a number of radio series, including a history of Ireland and a documentary series on the Gaeltacht Civil Rights Movement, Pobal ar Aire: Gluaiseacht Chearta Sibhialta na Gaeltachta 1969-2009.

He lives in Carraroe with his wife. He has one daughter, Síle, who works in the education, and two sons, Rónán and Donncha Mac Con Iomaire. Both sons work in the media industry.
