= Ridge (surname) =

Ridge is an English surname. Additionally, as an Anglo-Irish surname, Ridge may translate Mac an Iomaire or Mac Con Iomaire.

Notable people with the surname include:

- Alan Ridge (born 1934), Australian politician
- Albert Alphonso Ridge (1898–1967), American judge
- Antonia Ridge (1895–1981), Dutch-British writer and broadcaster
- Ben Ridge (born 1989), Australian rugby league footballer
- John Ridge or Yellow Bird (1802–1839), member of the Cherokee Tribe, son of Major Ridge
- John Rollin Ridge or Cheesquatalawny (1827–1867), member of the Cherokee tribe, first Native American novelist
- Major Ridge or Pathkiller II (1771–1839), Cherokee Indian leader
- Matthew Ridge (born 1968), New Zealand rugby footballer
- Sophy Ridge (born 1984), English journalist
- Sterling Ridge (1936–2012), American politician
- Stuart Ridge (born 1961), English cricketer
- Tom Ridge (born 1945), American politician and author
