= Mac an Iomaire =

Mac an Iomaire is a Gaelic-Irish surname.

== Overview ==
Mac an Iomaire is a gaelicisation of the Anglo-Irish surname Ridge, which is recorded in County Roscommon in the early 17th century. Some thirty householders named Ridge were located in Connemara, County Galway, according to Griffith's Valuation of 1847-64.

Some use the form Mac Con Iomaire which is, however, a gaelicisation of the surname Montgomery.

== People with the surname ==
- Séamus Mac an Iomaire (1891–1967), botanist and writer
- Tom Ridge, Pennsylvania governor and first Director of Homeland Security
