= Mac Con Iomaire =

Mac Con Iomaire, Gaelic-Irish surname

== Overview ==
In Ireland, the surname Montgomery has in some cases undergone gaelicisation, with Montgomery translated into Mac Con Iomaire. It is also used to translate the surname Ridge. It is found mainly in Gaeltacht areas such as County Donegal and County Galway, but also in urban areas such as Dublin.

It is quite distinct from the very similar surname Mac an Iomaire.

== People with the surname ==
- Colm Mac Con Iomaire, musician with Irish band The Frames
- Darach Mac Con Iomaire, actor and director
- Liam Mac Con Iomaire, biographer, journalist and broadcaster
- Mairtin Mac Con Iomaire, professional chef
- Nuala Nic Con Iomaire, playwright, died 2010
- Pádraic Mac Con Iomaire, seanchai
- Rónán Mac Con Iomaire, journalist and Deputy Head RnaG
- Tomás Mac Con Iomaire, radio producer
