= Rónán Mac Con Iomaire =

Irish author, broadcaster, director at Údarás na Gaeltachta (born 1975)

- Education: Dublin City University (BA in Journalism), Imperial College London (MBA)
- Occupations: Director of Regional & Community Development & Language, Údarás na Gaeltachta
- Writing career
- Genres: Non-fiction, sports history
- Notable works: The Man Who Was Never Knocked Down, Rocky Ros Muc, An Ghluaiseacht
- Notable awards: ESB National Media Award, Oireachtas Journalist of the Year, An tOireachtas New Writer of the Year, Celtic Media Festival Sports Documentary of the Year

Rónán Mac Con Iomaire is the Director of Regional & Community Development & Language with Údarás na Gaeltachta and is an Irish author and broadcaster.

== Early life ==
Mac Con Iomaire was raised in the Connemara Gaeltacht village of An Cheathrú Rua, the eldest of three children of Tomás Mac Con Iomaire and Mairéad.

=== Career ===
Mac Con Iomaire was educated at Scoil Chuimsitheach Chiaráin, and studied BA in Journalism in Dublin City University (DCU). While at university, he was editor of the college newspaper and contributed to a number of other university publications.

He began his journalistic career as a news feature writer with the Evening Herald and also worked for the Irish Independent.

In 1996, with the opening of Teilifís na Gaeilge, Mac Con Iomaire took up a role as video journalist with Nuacht TnaG. Two years later, he returned to Independent News & Media as a freelancer, while also working as Dublin Correspondent for the Irish language newspaper Foinse, and as an editor for the Telecom Éireann (now eircom) online publication Cumasc. He was also a contributor to various publications such as Magill and The Irish Times during this period.

In 1999, he co-founded the communications company, meas media, along with Breandán Ó hEaghra, and became managing director of the company, focussing mostly on the expanding web industry and the Irish language sector.

In 2002, he was appointed Local Government correspondent for Nuacht RTÉ and Nuacht TG4, where we won a number of awards for his journalism. In 2004, he won an ESB National Media Award for his investigation of planning irregularities. In 2006, he was awarded the Oireachtas Journalist of the Year award following his revelations regarding a personal fund-raising dinner in Manchester for the then Taoiseach, Bertie Ahern.

While working for RTÉ, he worked on a number of documentaries. The well-reviewed UEFA sa Ghaeltacht, which saw Mac Con Iomaire as presenter and writer, told the story of a UEFA Cup soccer match being played on a Gaelic football pitch in rural Connemara. "Trálaer" looked at life aboard a deep-sea pelagic fishing trawler from the Aran Islands, which was again presented and written by Mac Con Iomaire. Saighdiúr looked at the role of Irish citizens in the British army during World War II, where Mac Con Iomaire used the case of his grand-uncle, Paddy Ridge, to illustrate the story. Ridge was killed while serving in the Irish Guards in Tunisia in 1943. Mac Con Iomaire shot, co-directed, wrote and presented Saighdiúr.

He was appointed Leascheannaire (deputy head) of Ireland's national Irish-language radio broadcaster, RTÉ Raidió na Gaeltachta, in 2011.

In 2014, he was appointed RTÉ's first ever Group Head of Irish Language.

In 2019, he became Director of Regional & Community Development & Language with Údarás na Gaeltachta.

=== Writing ===
Mac Con Iomaire is the author of three books. Rocky Ros Muc (Cló Iar-Chonnachta), a biography of Irish boxer Seán Mannion, who fought for the light-middleweight world championship in Madison Square Garden, New York in 1984, earned Mac Con Iomaire the New Writer of the Year Award at the Oireachtas Literary Awards in 2013. The book looks at how Mannion, who won the US light-middleweight title in 1983, escaped a future as one of Whitey Bulger's henchmen and climbed his way to the top of the rankings in what was one of the most competitive weight divisions in boxing history, and how drink and depression put an end to his ambitions of glory.

US publishers Rowman & Littlefield published Mac Con Iomaire's second book, The Man Who Was Never Knocked Down, in 2018, an English-language telling of Seán Mannion's story. The book, which was well-reviewed, was initially launched into the North American market before being released in Ireland and the UK.

In 2024, Mac Con Iomaire published An Ghluaiseacht: Scéal Chearta Sibhialta na Gaeltachta (Cló Iar-Chonnachta), the story of the radical generation who stood their ground for the rights of the Gaeltacht people, and the Civil Rights Movement they founded that transformed the Gaeltacht from the ground up. Among the positive reviews for the book, it has been highlighted as one of the best Irish-language books of 2025.

Rocky Ros Muc was developed as a feature-length documentary by Below the Radar TV in 2017, and has won awards at the Boston Irish Film Festival, the Galway Film Fleadh, and the Celtic Media Festival, among other awards. Mac Con Iomaire was associate producer and contributor.

Along with being the first Irish-language documentary to be long-listed for the Oscars, and achieving a cinema release in both the US and Ireland, Rocky Ros Muc received numerous positive reviews.

He is a contributor to Scéal Scéil, an insight into the way the modern Irish journalist operates. Scéal Scéil, edited by Breandán Delap (Cois Life, 2014)., as well as Comhrá Cosáin, a compilation of agallaimh beirte and lúibíní (see below) edited by Fearghas Mac Lochlainn.

Mac Con Iomaire is also a writer and performer of agallaimh beirte (a usually humorous conversation in verse between two people) and lúibíní (the same as an agallamh beirte, except that the verses are sung), and has won a number of awards at Oireachtas na Gaeilge. In 2024, he won the Oireachtas's Comórtas na nAmhrán Nuachumtha.
