= List of listed buildings in Dalry, North Ayrshire =

This is a list of listed buildings in the parish of Dalry in North Ayrshire, Scotland.

== List ==
Name	Location	Date listed	Grid ref. (Note: Sometimes known as OSGB36, the grid reference (where provided) is based on the British national grid reference system used by the Ordnance Survey. • "Guide to National Grid". Ordnance Survey. • "Get-a-map". Ordnance Survey.)	Geo-coordinates	Notes	LB number (Note: Historic Environment Scotland assign a unique alphanumeric identifier to each designated site in Scotland, for listed buildings this always begins with "LB", for example "LB12345".)	Image
Ryefield House Stables				55°42′59″N 4°43′37″W	Category C(S)	1252	Upload Photo
Ryefield House and Garden Walls				55°42′54″N 4°43′45″W	Category B	1253	Upload Photo
83 New Street Dalry				55°42′26″N 4°43′00″W	Category C(S)	1259	Upload Photo
31, 33 Sharon Street Dalry				55°42′32″N 4°43′24″W	Category C(S)	1266	Upload Photo
5, 7 Blair Road Dalry				55°42′21″N 4°42′29″W	Category B	1186	Upload Photo
81 New Street Dalry				55°42′26″N 4°43′01″W	Category C(S)	1194	Upload Photo
Blair Estate North Bridge Over Bombo Burn				55°42′06″N 4°41′36″W	Category C(S)	1199	Upload Photo
Blair Estate South Lodge				55°41′20″N 4°41′49″W	Category C(S)	1202	Upload Photo
7 Aitken Street Dalry				55°42′25″N 4°43′08″W	Category B	1209	Upload Photo
4 Kilwinning Road, Dalry				55°42′12″N 4°43′29″W	Category C(S)	1218	Upload Photo
6 Townend Street Dalry				55°42′26″N 4°43′11″W	Category B	1237	Upload Photo
Pitcon House and Walled Garden				55°43′10″N 4°42′33″W	Category B	1251	Upload Photo
Swindridgemuir				55°42′46″N 4°40′35″W	Category A	1254	Upload Photo
Aitken Street, St Palladius' RC Church & Presbytery Dalry				55°42′25″N 4°43′05″W	Category C(S)	1184	Upload another image
Baidland Manor				55°42′56″N 4°45′29″W	Category C(S)	1195	Upload Photo
Brownhill House				55°43′37″N 4°41′15″W	Category B	1204	Upload Photo
9 Aitken Street, Chapelhill, Dalry				55°42′24″N 4°43′07″W	Category B	1210	Upload Photo
14-16 The Cross Former Town House (Now Dalry Co-Operative Society Ltd Showrooms), Dalry				55°42′31″N 4°43′10″W	Category B	1214	Upload Photo
10 Garnock Street, Dalry				55°42′24″N 4°43′04″W	Category C(S)	1215	Upload Photo
12 Garnock Street, Dalry				55°42′24″N 4°43′04″W	Category C(S)	1216	Upload Photo
31, 33, 35, 37 Main Street Dalry				55°42′31″N 4°43′17″W	Category C(S)	1222	Upload Photo
18, 20, 22 Main Street				55°42′31″N 4°43′16″W	Category C(S)	1227	Upload Photo
28, 30, 32 Main Street/Corner Kirk Close				55°42′30″N 4°43′17″W	Category C(S)	1229	Upload Photo
1, 3, 5, 7 New Street Dalry				55°42′29″N 4°43′11″W	Category C(S)	1231	Upload Photo
Hillside Cottages Mr Macdonald (Building to Left)				55°42′18″N 4°42′10″W	Category C(S)	1245	Upload Photo
Munnoch Farm				55°41′53″N 4°46′56″W	Category B	1250	Upload Photo
69 New Street, Dalry				55°42′26″N 4°43′02″W	Category B	1193	Upload Photo
Blair Estate Forester's Cottage				55°42′03″N 4°41′37″W	Category C(S)	1197	Upload Photo
Blair Estate Garden Walls				55°41′46″N 4°42′05″W	Category B	1198	Upload Photo
Blair Estate North Lodge & Gatepiers				55°42′11″N 4°41′55″W	Category C(S)	1200	Upload Photo
The Cross Trinity Church, Dalry				55°42′31″N 4°43′12″W	Category B	1211	Upload another image
17, 19, 21 Main Street (Corner North Street), Dalry				55°42′32″N 4°43′16″W	Category B	1220	Upload Photo
43, 45 New Street, Dalry				55°42′27″N 4°43′08″W	Category B	1233	Upload Photo
Dykes Farm				55°43′57″N 4°44′06″W	Category C(S)	1240	Upload Photo
Hillside Cottages Mr Macewan (left) Mrs Craig (centre) Mr Harkins (right)				55°42′17″N 4°42′11″W	Category C(S)	1246	Upload Photo
2, 4, 6 North Street, Dalry				55°42′32″N 4°43′17″W	Category C(S)	131	Upload Photo
2 Townend Street, Dalry				55°42′26″N 4°43′10″W	Category C(S)	119	Upload Photo
Swindridgemuir Stables				55°42′48″N 4°40′35″W	Category B	1255	Upload Photo
Courthill, The Old Tavern, Dalry				55°42′32″N 4°43′10″W	Category C(S)	1257	Upload Photo
The Cross St Margaret's Church and Halls, Dalry				55°42′30″N 4°43′15″W	Category B	1258	Upload Photo
24, 26, 28 New Street, Dalry				55°42′29″N 4°43′09″W	Category C(S)	1263	Upload Photo
Braehead Templand, Dalry				55°42′41″N 4°43′24″W	Category B	1188	Upload Photo
Blair Estate Smithy				55°41′27″N 4°41′32″W	Category C(S)	1201	Upload Photo
3 Aitken Street, Public Halls, Dalry				55°42′26″N 4°43′08″W	Category C(S)	1207	Upload Photo
47-51 (Odd) New Street, Dalry				55°42′27″N 4°43′07″W	Category C(S)	1234	Upload Photo
Hillside Cottages, Mr Macdonald (Building to Right)				55°42′18″N 4°42′10″W	Category C(S)	1244	Upload Photo
Giffen House				55°42′43″N 4°38′19″W	Category B	120	Upload another image
43 Sharon Street Dalry				55°42′32″N 4°43′26″W	Category C(S)	1267	Upload Photo
12, 14, 16 Main Street				55°42′31″N 4°43′16″W	Category C(S)	1226	Upload Photo
34, 36, 38 Main Street Dalry				55°42′29″N 4°43′18″W	Category C(S)	1230	Upload Photo
33, 35, 37 New Street Dalry				55°42′28″N 4°43′10″W	Category C(S)	1232	Upload Photo
Doggartland House And Bridge				55°42′59″N 4°43′29″W	Category C(S)	1239	Upload Photo
28, 30 North Street Dalry				55°42′33″N 4°43′17″W	Category C(S)	1265	Upload Photo
Blair Road Garnock Bridge, Dalry				55°42′27″N 4°42′50″W	Category C(S)	1185	Upload Photo
Bridgend Textile Mills And Millhouse, Dalry				55°42′29″N 4°42′43″W	Category B	1189	Upload Photo
Courthill Dalry Mission Halls Dalry				55°42′32″N 4°43′11″W	Category B	1191	Upload Photo
Blair House				55°41′46″N 4°41′57″W	Category A	1196	Upload Photo
Blair Estate Stables				55°41′41″N 4°41′55″W	Category B	1203	Upload Photo
1 Aitken Street Dalry				55°42′27″N 4°43′09″W	Category C(S)	1206	Upload Photo
5 Aitken Street Dalry				55°42′25″N 4°43′09″W	Category B	1208	Upload Photo
9,10,11 The Cross Dalry				55°42′31″N 4°43′11″W	Category C(S)	1212	Upload Photo
13 The Cross Clydesdale Bank Building Dalry				55°42′31″N 4°43′11″W	Category C(S)	1213	Upload Photo
4, 6 Main Street Dalry				55°42′31″N 4°43′15″W	Category C(S)	1223	Upload Photo
8 Main Street				55°42′31″N 4°43′15″W	Category C(S)	1224	Upload Photo
10 Main Street				55°42′31″N 4°43′15″W	Category C(S)	1225	Upload Photo
Muirhouse Farm				55°43′32″N 4°40′00″W	Category C(S)	1249	Upload Photo
Swinlees				55°44′17″N 4°43′06″W	Category B	1256	Upload Photo
85 New Street Dalry				55°42′26″N 4°42′59″W	Category C(S)	1260	Upload Photo
16, 18 New Street Dalry				55°42′30″N 4°43′09″W	Category B	1262	Upload Photo
62 New Street Dalry				55°42′27″N 4°43′05″W	Category C(S)	1264	Upload Photo
Bleeze Farm Dalry				55°42′40″N 4°43′27″W	Category C(S)	1187	Upload Photo
Carsehead Bridge				55°42′40″N 4°42′23″W	Category B	1205	Upload Photo
24 Main Street				55°42′30″N 4°43′16″W	Category C(S)	1228	Upload Photo
4 Townend Street Dalry				55°42′26″N 4°43′11″W	Category B	1236	Upload Photo
Giffen Stables				55°42′42″N 4°38′33″W	Category C(S)	1241	Upload Photo
Hillend House				55°43′09″N 4°43′10″W	Category B	1243	Upload Photo
11, 13,15 Main Street Dalry				55°42′32″N 4°43′15″W	Category C(S)	118	Upload Photo
Dalry, Courthill Street, Hotel De Croft				55°42′37″N 4°42′50″W	Category C(S)	6407	Upload Photo
10, 12 New Street Dalry				55°42′30″N 4°43′10″W	Category C(S)	1261	Upload Photo
Courthill Fountain Dalry				55°42′33″N 4°43′10″W	Category C(S)	1190	Upload Photo
67 New Street Royal Hotel Dalry				55°42′26″N 4°43′04″W	Category B	1192	Upload Photo
16 Garnock Street Amulree, Dalry				55°42′23″N 4°43′04″W	Category C(S)	1217	Upload Photo
9 Main Street "The Auld Hoose Bar" Dalry				55°42′32″N 4°43′15″W	Category B	1219	Upload Photo
23, 25, 27, 29 Main Street Dalry				55°42′31″N 4°43′16″W	Category B	1221	Upload Photo
Townend Street Post Office Annexe Dalry				55°42′27″N 4°43′11″W	Category C(S)	1235	Upload Photo
West Kilbride Road Cemetery Lodge And Gatepiers				55°42′31″N 4°43′48″W	Category C(S)	1238	Upload Photo
Giffordland				55°42′10″N 4°45′38″W	Category C(S)	1242	Upload Photo
Kersland Farm				55°43′07″N 4°41′57″W	Category B	1247	Upload Photo
Maulside Mains				55°44′00″N 4°39′38″W	Category B	1248	Upload Photo
Courthill Parkhill House Dalry				55°42′33″N 4°42′54″W	Category C(S)	130	Upload Photo

== Key ==
The scheme for classifying buildings in Scotland is:

- Category A: "buildings of national or international importance, either architectural or historic; or fine, little-altered examples of some particular period, style or building type."
- Category B: "buildings of regional or more than local importance; or major examples of some particular period, style or building type, which may have been altered."
- Category C: "buildings of local importance; lesser examples of any period, style, or building type, as originally constructed or moderately altered; and simple traditional buildings which group well with other listed buildings."

In March 2016 there were 47,288 listed buildings in Scotland. Of these, 8% were Category A, and 50% were Category B, with the remaining 42% being Category C.

== See also ==
- List of listed buildings in North Ayrshire
- Scheduled monuments in North Ayrshire
