= List of listed buildings in Kilmory, North Ayrshire =

This is a list of listed buildings in the parish of Kilmory (western half of the Isle of Arran) in North Ayrshire, Scotland.

== List ==
Name	Location	Date Listed	Grid Ref. (Note: Sometimes known as OSGB36, the grid reference (where provided) is based on the British national grid reference system used by the Ordnance Survey. • "Guide to National Grid". Ordnance Survey. • "Get-a-map". Ordnance Survey.)	Geo-coordinates	Notes	LB Number (Note: Historic Environment Scotland assign a unique alphanumeric identifier to each designated site in Scotland, for listed buildings this always begins with "LB", for example "LB12345".)	Image
Isle Of Arran, Bennecarrigan, Free Church Of Scotland, Including Boundary Wall				55°26′58″N 5°15′19″W	Category B	13633	Upload Photo
Isle Of Arran, Dougarie Lodge, Game Larder				55°34′58″N 5°21′31″W	Category B	13045	Upload Photo
Isle Of Arran, Shiskine, Torbeg, Former Manse				55°31′10″N 5°19′37″W	Category B	12882	Upload Photo
Lagg Hotel				55°26′45″N 5°14′02″W	Category C(S)	7641	Upload Photo
Lochranza Church And Graveyard				55°42′05″N 5°17′05″W	Category B	7634	Upload another image See more images
Row Of Cottages Nos. 1-12, Catacol And Front Garden Walls				55°41′43″N 5°19′34″W	Category B	7637	Upload another image See more images
Hazelwood Farm, Imachar, Near Pirnmill, Including Outbuildings				55°36′40″N 5°23′26″W	Category C(S)	49537	Upload Photo
Isle Of Arran, Shiskine, Torbeg, Nicol Memorial				55°31′08″N 5°19′32″W	Category C(S)	13632	Upload Photo
Bridgend Cottage				55°26′43″N 5°14′00″W	Category C(S)	13663	Upload Photo
Kildonan, Project House (Former Church Of Scotland) Including Gatepiers And Boundary Wall				55°26′51″N 5°07′58″W	Category C(S)	13452	Upload Photo
Kildonan, Drimla Cottage, Including Gatepiers, Gates And Railings				55°26′37″N 5°07′30″W	Category C(S)	13453	Upload Photo
Lochranza, Barking House				55°42′08″N 5°17′06″W	Category B	13456	Upload Photo
Kilmory Manse				55°26′52″N 5°13′16″W	Category C(S)	7640	Upload Photo
St. Molio's Church Shiskine				55°30′49″N 5°18′43″W	Category A	7635	Upload another image
Lochranza, Former Free Church				55°42′15″N 5°17′34″W	Category C(S)	13457	Upload Photo
Isle Of Arran, Dippen, Dippen Lodge				55°27′21″N 5°05′10″W	Category C(S)	13043	Upload Photo
Isle Of Arran, Shiskine, War Memorial				55°30′23″N 5°19′09″W	Category C(S)	12881	Upload Photo
Lochranza Castle				55°42′19″N 5°17′28″W	Category A	7636	Upload another image
Pirnmill, Former Church Of Scotland, Including Gatepiers And Boundary Walls				55°38′43″N 5°22′55″W	Category B	13489	Upload Photo
Isle Of Arran, Blackwaterfoot, Victoria Lodge				55°30′11″N 5°19′55″W	Category B	13635	Upload Photo
Isle Of Arran, Dippen, Dippen Lodge, Stable Court And Offices				55°27′23″N 5°05′13″W	Category C(S)	13044	Upload Photo
Isle Of Arran, Dougarie Lodge, The Towers, (Stables And Kennels)				55°34′58″N 5°21′31″W	Category B	13046	Upload Photo
Isle Of Arran, Machrie, Machrie Farmhouse				55°33′09″N 5°19′37″W	Category B	12880	Upload Photo
Dougarie Lodge Boathouse				55°34′47″N 5°21′38″W	Category B	7639	Upload Photo
Kildonan, Drimla Lodge, Including Gatepiers, Gates And Railings				55°26′36″N 5°07′28″W	Category B	13454	Upload Photo
Kildonan, Mansfield				55°26′39″N 5°07′54″W	Category C(S)	13455	Upload Photo
Kilmory Church And Graveyard				55°26′53″N 5°13′19″W	Category C(S)	7633	Upload Photo
Dougrie Lodge				55°34′53″N 5°21′34″W	Category B	7638	Upload Photo
Isle Of Arran, Bennecarrigan, War Memorial				55°26′58″N 5°15′20″W	Category C(S)	13634	Upload Photo
Pirnmill, Former Church Of Scotland, Memorial To Rev John Kennedy				55°38′43″N 5°22′55″W	Category B	13479	Upload Photo
Isle Of Arran, Dougarie Lodge, Walled Garden				55°34′56″N 5°21′32″W	Category B	12879	Upload Photo
Burnside Cottage				55°26′42″N 5°14′01″W	Category C(S)	7642	Upload Photo
Lime Kiln, Clauchog				55°26′28″N 5°14′35″W	Category C(S)	7643	Upload Photo
Pirnmill, Church Of Scotland (Former Free Church)				55°38′59″N 5°22′50″W	Category C(S)	49535	Upload another image See more images

== Key ==
The scheme for classifying buildings in Scotland is:

- Category A: "buildings of national or international importance, either architectural or historic; or fine, little-altered examples of some particular period, style or building type."
- Category B: "buildings of regional or more than local importance; or major examples of some particular period, style or building type, which may have been altered."
- Category C: "buildings of local importance; lesser examples of any period, style, or building type, as originally constructed or moderately altered; and simple traditional buildings which group well with other listed buildings."

In March 2016 there were 47,288 listed buildings in Scotland. Of these, 8% were Category A, and 50% were Category B, with the remaining 42% being Category C.

== See also ==
- List of listed buildings in North Ayrshire
