= List of listed buildings in Largs, North Ayrshire =

This is a list of listed buildings in the parish of Largs in North Ayrshire, Scotland.

== List ==
Name	Location	Date Listed	Grid Ref. (Note: Sometimes known as OSGB36, the grid reference (where provided) is based on the British national grid reference system used by the Ordnance Survey. • "Guide to National Grid". Ordnance Survey. • "Get-a-map". Ordnance Survey.)	Geo-coordinates	Notes	LB Number (Note: Historic Environment Scotland assign a unique alphanumeric identifier to each designated site in Scotland, for listed buildings this always begins with "LB", for example "LB12345".)	Image
Halkshill House, Summer House (To West)				55°47′38″N 4°51′19″W	Category B	37173	Upload Photo
4 John Street, Curling Hall Lodge				55°47′18″N 4°51′56″W	Category B	37175	Upload Photo
2 May Street Sherwood Hotel				55°47′12″N 4°51′45″W	Category B	37189	Upload Photo
67 Nelson Street				55°47′47″N 4°51′54″W	Category C(S)	37191	Upload Photo
28 Nelson Street Rondelle				55°47′47″N 4°52′01″W	Category B	37195	Upload Photo
Skelmorlie Aisle And Cemetery Wall And Gate Piers				55°47′41″N 4°52′07″W	Category A	37198	Upload another image See more images
Knock Castle West Lodge And Gatepiers				55°49′25″N 4°53′18″W	Category B	7273	Upload Photo
Quarter House				55°49′04″N 4°53′01″W	Category C(S)	7279	Upload Photo
Skelmorlie Measured Mile Marker Poles				55°52′02″N 4°53′28″W	Category B	7286	Upload Photo
Skelmorlie Village 5 Montgomery Terrace Glendower House And Gatepiers To East And To West				55°52′14″N 4°53′17″W	Category B	7289	Upload Photo
Fairlie Village Fairlie Parish Church Hall (Former Free Church)				55°45′26″N 4°51′16″W	Category C(S)	7291	Upload Photo
Fairlie Village Fairlie School And Gatepiers				55°45′27″N 4°51′13″W	Category B	7292	Upload Photo
Kelburn Monument To John, 3Rd Earl Of Glasgow				55°46′15″N 4°50′27″W	Category A	7295	Upload Photo
Kelburn Former Stables And Cottages (Visitor Centre)				55°46′09″N 4°50′43″W	Category B	7296	Upload Photo
Kelburn Cottages And Former Cartshed To North West Of Mansion House				55°46′17″N 4°50′46″W	Category B	7297	Upload Photo
Kelburn Sundial To West Of House				55°46′15″N 4°50′39″W	Category A	7298	Upload Photo
Knock Castle North Lodge And Gatepiers				55°49′43″N 4°52′59″W	Category C(S)	7309	Upload Photo
Fairlie Village 8 Burnfoot Road Burnside				55°45′09″N 4°51′16″W	Category B	7314	Upload Photo
Skelmorlie, 7-9 Eglinton Terrace, St Margaret's With Boundary Wall And Garden Steps				55°51′46″N 4°53′12″W	Category C(S)	50038	Upload Photo
Aubery Crescent St Columba's Episcopal Church				55°48′10″N 4°52′20″W	Category B	37148	Upload Photo
Bath Street, St John's Church				55°47′35″N 4°52′14″W	Category B	37153	Upload Photo
Broomfield Place Elderslie Hotel (Building To North; Formerly Priory Lodge)				55°47′19″N 4°51′57″W	Category B	37161	Upload Photo
124 Greenock Road St Columba's College (Formerly Northfield)				55°48′28″N 4°52′38″W	Category B	37168	Upload Photo
Greenock Road/ 1-9 (Odd Nos) Nelson Street, Nardini Lounge, Cafe And Restaurant				55°47′49″N 4°52′08″W	Category B	37170	Upload another image See more images
Hailie House				55°47′11″N 4°51′27″W	Category C(S)	37171	Upload Photo
21 Main Street				55°47′40″N 4°52′09″W	Category C(S)	37180	Upload Photo
23 Main Street				55°47′40″N 4°52′08″W	Category C(S)	37181	Upload Photo
Makerston Place, Public Fountain				55°47′27″N 4°52′11″W	Category C(S)	37188	Upload Photo
Union Street Dunn Memorial Hall				55°47′35″N 4°52′13″W	Category C(S)	37196	Upload Photo
Skelmorlie Aisle, Brisbane Aisle				55°47′41″N 4°52′08″W	Category A	37199	Upload Photo
Skelmorlie Village Skelmorlie Parish Church Lamp Near Main Door				55°52′20″N 4°53′24″W	Category A	7270	Upload another image
Noddsdale House				55°48′55″N 4°51′06″W	Category B	7277	Upload Photo
Skelmorlie Castle And Courtyard Buildings				55°51′07″N 4°53′05″W	Category B	7281	Upload Photo
Knock Castle Walled Garden And Glass Houses				55°49′42″N 4°53′04″W	Category B	7308	Upload Photo
Fairlie Village The Causeway Rockhaven				55°45′22″N 4°51′21″W	Category C(S)	7316	Upload Photo
Skelmorlie, 31 The Lane				55°52′04″N 4°53′03″W	Category C(S)	50047	Upload Photo
8-22 Aubery Crescent Carlton Terrace (Even Nos)				55°48′10″N 4°52′23″W	Category B	37149	Upload Photo
21 Bath Street, The Cottage (Entered Through Pend)				55°47′38″N 4°52′12″W	Category C(S)	37151	Upload Photo
Bath Street, Clark Memorial Church And Gatepiers				55°47′37″N 4°52′12″W	Category A	37152	Upload another image
30 Bath Street, Library (Former Bath House)				55°47′37″N 4°52′16″W	Category B	37155	Upload Photo
67 Brisbane Street Fernes Villa And Gatepiers				55°48′07″N 4°51′55″W	Category C(S)	37158	Upload Photo
5 Broomfield Crescent Littleraith				55°47′15″N 4°51′48″W	Category B	37159	Upload Photo
Greenock Road Brooksby Convalescent Home And Gatepiers				55°47′52″N 4°52′04″W	Category A	37165	Upload another image See more images
Greenock Road, Netherhall House & Gatehouse				55°48′20″N 4°52′12″W	Category B	37167	Upload Photo
1 Main Street/2 Galowgate Street				55°47′41″N 4°52′11″W	Category C(S)	37178	Upload Photo
25-29 Main Street (Odd Nos)				55°47′40″N 4°52′08″W	Category C(S)	37182	Upload Photo
11 Nelson Street				55°47′49″N 4°52′05″W	Category C(S)	37190	Upload Photo
Skelmorlie Village, Inchgower House, 16 Shore Road				55°52′05″N 4°53′21″W	Category B	7272	Upload Photo
Manor Park Hotel Former Stable Block				55°50′06″N 4°53′01″W	Category C(S)	7276	Upload Photo
Skelmorlie Village 15 The Crescent Croftmohr House And Gatepiers				55°52′03″N 4°53′09″W	Category B	7284	Upload Photo
Skelmorlie Long Hill Moreland Garden Flats 1 And 2 House, Flats 1, 2 And 3				55°52′22″N 4°53′18″W	Category B	7288	Upload Photo
Kelburn Castle Walled Courtyard To North And Gatepiers				55°46′15″N 4°50′38″W	Category A	7294	Upload another image
Kelburn Sundial In Kitchen Garden				55°46′20″N 4°50′48″W	Category B	7299	Upload Photo
Kelburn Bridge Over Kelburn Water Near Former Stable Block				55°46′11″N 4°50′46″W	Category C(S)	7300	Upload Photo
Kelburn West Lodge And Gatepiers				55°46′27″N 4°51′14″W	Category B	7304	Upload Photo
Skelmorlie, 5 Eglinton Terrace, Wilmar, With Garden Steps, Boundary Walls And Gatepiers				55°51′51″N 4°53′11″W	Category C(S)	50037	Upload Photo
Skelmorlie, 12 Montgomerie Terrace, Oakhill With Garage, Boundary Wall, Gatepiers, Garden Terraces And Steps				55°52′06″N 4°53′21″W	Category C(S)	50044	Upload Photo
Skelmorlie, 15 Shore Road, Thorndale, With Boundary Wall				55°51′51″N 4°53′25″W	Category B	50045	Upload Photo
Skelmorlie, 10 Shore Road, Redesdale Including Former Service Wing, Boundary Wall And Gatepiers				55°52′19″N 4°53′26″W	Category C(S)	50046	Upload Photo
Bankhead Farm				55°48′42″N 4°52′35″W	Category C(S)	37150	Upload Photo
Bath Street/Promenade War Memorial				55°47′32″N 4°52′17″W	Category C(S)	37156	Upload Photo
Greenock Road, Moorburn House				55°47′56″N 4°52′03″W	Category B	37166	Upload Photo
Halkshill				55°47′36″N 4°51′14″W	Category B	37172	Upload Photo
33-45 Main Street Royal Bank Building (Odd Nos)				55°47′39″N 4°52′07″W	Category B	37183	Upload Photo
47 Main Street Mill Knitwear				55°47′39″N 4°52′07″W	Category C(S)	37184	Upload Photo
2 Nelson Street				55°47′48″N 4°52′06″W	Category B	37194	Upload Photo
Skelmorlie Village 11 The Crescent The Birkenward				55°52′06″N 4°53′09″W	Category B	7283	Upload Photo
Skelmorlie Village 3 Montgomery Terrace Manse And Gatepiers				55°52′16″N 4°53′17″W	Category C(S)	7287	Upload Photo
Kelburn Gatepiers On South Drive (At A78)				55°46′14″N 4°51′15″W	Category B	7302	Upload Photo
Knock Castle And Garden Pavilion Block And Gatepiers To East				55°49′35″N 4°53′05″W	Category A	7306	Upload Photo
Brisbane Mains Meridian Pillar				55°48′52″N 4°51′40″W	Category B	7312	Upload Photo
Fairlie Village Fairlie Castle				55°45′15″N 4°50′58″W	Category B	7315	Upload Photo
Skelmorlie, 38 Montgomerie Terrace, Stroove With Boundary Walls, Gatepiers, Bridge, Waterfalls And Garden Steps				55°51′58″N 4°53′21″W	Category C(S)	49905	Upload Photo
Skelmorlie, 4 Eglinton Terrace, Beechwood With Ancillary Building, Garden Terraces And Steps				55°51′50″N 4°53′16″W	Category C(S)	50039	Upload Photo
Skelmorlie, 7 Montgomerie Terrace, The Beeches With Former Stable And Coach House, Garden Steps, Boundary Wall, Gates And Gatepiers				55°52′13″N 4°53′17″W	Category C(S)	50041	Upload Photo
Skelmorlie, 11A Montgomerie Terrace With Ancillary Building				55°52′09″N 4°53′16″W	Category C(S)	50042	Upload Photo
Skelmorlie, 13 Montgomerie Terrace And 16 And 16A Eglinton Gardens, Tigh Geal With Gates, Gatepiers, Boundary Wall, Garden Terrace, Steps And Drainage Channel				55°52′05″N 4°53′17″W	Category B	50043	Upload Photo
2-10 Bath Street (Even Nos)				55°47′39″N 4°52′13″W	Category C(S)	37154	Upload Photo
32, 34 Boyd Street				55°47′46″N 4°52′00″W	Category C(S)	37157	Upload Photo
Broomfield Place/John St Elderslie Hotel (Building To South) And Gatepiers				55°47′19″N 4°51′57″W	Category B	37160	Upload Photo
Greenock Road, Danefield House, Stables, Lodge And Gatepiers				55°48′37″N 4°52′49″W	Category B	37169	Upload Photo
Kilbirnie Road, Cemetery Lodge And Walls				55°47′07″N 4°51′15″W	Category B	37176	Upload Photo
Waterside Street "Three Sisters" Meridian Pillars				55°47′38″N 4°51′40″W	Category B	37197	Upload another image See more images
Knock Castle Stable Block And Gatepiers				55°49′34″N 4°52′57″W	Category C(S)	7274	Upload Photo
The Crescent Croftmohr Lodge (Formerly Gardener's Cottage)				55°52′01″N 4°53′11″W	Category C(S)	7285	Upload Photo
Skelmorlie Village Montgomery Terrace Craig Memorial Home And Gatepiers				55°52′06″N 4°53′17″W	Category B	7290	Upload Photo
Fairlie Village Fairlie Village Hall				55°45′24″N 4°51′16″W	Category B	7293	Upload Photo
Kelburn Gatepiers On Original Main West Drive (At A78)				55°46′13″N 4°51′15″W	Category C(S)	7303	Upload Photo
69, 71, 73 Nelson Street				55°47′47″N 4°51′54″W	Category C(S)	37192	Upload Photo
Whittlieburn Bridge Over Noddsdale Water (On Constablewood Road)				55°49′42″N 4°50′57″W	Category B	7271	Upload Photo
Brisbane Mains				55°49′13″N 4°51′37″W	Category B	7311	Upload Photo
Skelmorlie, 1 Halketburn Road, Balvonie With Former Laundry And Former Stable / Coachhouse				55°51′56″N 4°53′07″W	Category B	50040	Upload Photo
Gallowgate Street St Columba's Parish Church				55°47′47″N 4°52′08″W	Category B	37163	Upload another image See more images
11 Gateside Street				55°47′41″N 4°52′01″W	Category B	37164	Upload Photo
Harbour				55°47′42″N 4°52′20″W	Category C(S)	37174	Upload another image See more images
72, 74 Main Street				55°47′37″N 4°52′07″W	Category B	37186	Upload Photo
1 Makerston Place/1 Burnlea Road				55°47′30″N 4°52′09″W	Category C(S)	37187	Upload Photo
75 Nelson Street				55°47′47″N 4°51′53″W	Category C(S)	37193	Upload Photo
Skelmorlie Village Skelmorlie Parish Church, Hall And Quadrant Wall				55°52′19″N 4°53′24″W	Category B	7269	Upload Photo
Skelmorlie Village 9 The Crescent Tudor House And Gatepiers				55°52′08″N 4°53′08″W	Category B	7282	Upload Photo
Kelburn Foot Former Lodge				55°46′14″N 4°51′19″W	Category C(S)	7305	Upload Photo
Bridgend Old Bridge Over Skelmorlie Water				55°51′01″N 4°53′08″W	Category B	7310	Upload Photo
1 Anthony Road, Warriston				55°47′08″N 4°51′42″W	Category B	37147	Upload Photo
Charles Street, Whitelodge Hotel (Formerly Blackdales)				55°47′27″N 4°51′50″W	Category B	37162	Upload Photo
Largs Battle Monument ("The Pencil")				55°46′45″N 4°51′34″W	Category B	37177	Upload another image
5-11 Main Street (Odd Nos)				55°47′41″N 4°52′11″W	Category C(S)	37179	Upload Photo
20 Main Street Bank Of Scotland Building				55°47′40″N 4°52′11″W	Category C(S)	37185	Upload Photo
Manor Park Hotel				55°50′03″N 4°53′08″W	Category B	7275	Upload Photo
Noddsdale House Power House				55°48′55″N 4°51′06″W	Category C(S)	7278	Upload Photo
St Phillans Lodge				55°49′57″N 4°53′20″W	Category C(S)	7280	Upload Photo
Kelburn Gatepiers On North Drive (At A760)				55°47′00″N 4°51′10″W	Category C(S)	7301	Upload Photo
Knock Old Castle				55°49′38″N 4°53′09″W	Category B	7307	Upload Photo
Brisbane Mains Driveway Bridge Over Noddsdale Water				55°49′05″N 4°51′22″W	Category C(S)	7313	Upload Photo
Fairlie Village Fairlie Parish Church				55°45′38″N 4°51′17″W	Category B	7317	Upload Photo
Fairlie, 59 Main Road, Fairlie Lodge, Including Boundary Wall				55°45′29″N 4°51′19″W	Category C(S)	51722	Upload Photo

== Key ==
The scheme for classifying buildings in Scotland is:

- Category A: "buildings of national or international importance, either architectural or historic; or fine, little-altered examples of some particular period, style or building type."
- Category B: "buildings of regional or more than local importance; or major examples of some particular period, style or building type, which may have been altered."
- Category C: "buildings of local importance; lesser examples of any period, style, or building type, as originally constructed or moderately altered; and simple traditional buildings which group well with other listed buildings."

In March 2016 there were 47,288 listed buildings in Scotland. Of these, 8% were Category A, and 50% were Category B, with the remaining 42% being Category C.

== See also ==
- List of listed buildings in North Ayrshire
