= List of listed buildings in Cumbrae, North Ayrshire =

This is a list of listed buildings in the parish of Cumbrae in North Ayrshire, Scotland.

== List ==
Name	Location	Date Listed	Grid Ref. (Note: Sometimes known as OSGB36, the grid reference (where provided) is based on the British national grid reference system used by the Ordnance Survey. • "Guide to National Grid". Ordnance Survey. • "Get-a-map". Ordnance Survey.)	Geo-coordinates	Notes	LB Number (Note: Historic Environment Scotland assign a unique alphanumeric identifier to each designated site in Scotland, for listed buildings this always begins with "LB", for example "LB12345".)	Image
New Lighthouse on Little Cumbrae				55°43′16″N 4°58′01″W	Category B	852	Upload another image
Little Cumbrae Castle				55°43′13″N 4°56′35″W	Now scheduled monument SM2195	853	Upload another image
Millport, Bute Terrace, Cumbrae Parish Church (Church Of Scotland), including Boundary Wall and Gatepiers				55°45′12″N 4°55′58″W	Category C(S)	50968	Upload Photo
Monument, Tomont End				55°47′33″N 4°54′07″W	Category B	850	Upload another image
Old Lighthouse on Little Cumbrae				55°43′15″N 4°57′29″W	Now scheduled monument SM418	851	Upload another image

== Key ==
The scheme for classifying buildings in Scotland is:

- Category A: "buildings of national or international importance, either architectural or historic; or fine, little-altered examples of some particular period, style or building type."
- Category B: "buildings of regional or more than local importance; or major examples of some particular period, style or building type, which may have been altered."
- Category C: "buildings of local importance; lesser examples of any period, style, or building type, as originally constructed or moderately altered; and simple traditional buildings which group well with other listed buildings."

In March 2016 there were 47,288 listed buildings in Scotland. Of these, 8% were Category A, and 50% were Category B, with the remaining 42% being Category C.

== See also ==
- List of listed buildings in North Ayrshire
- Scheduled monuments in North Ayrshire
