= List of listed buildings in Dreghorn, North Ayrshire =

This is a list of listed buildings in the parish of Dreghorn in North Ayrshire, Scotland.

== List ==
Name	Location	Date Listed	Grid Ref. (Note: Sometimes known as OSGB36, the grid reference (where provided) is based on the British national grid reference system used by the Ordnance Survey. • "Guide to National Grid". Ordnance Survey. • "Get-a-map". Ordnance Survey.)	Geo-coordinates	Notes	LB Number (Note: Historic Environment Scotland assign a unique alphanumeric identifier to each designated site in Scotland, for listed buildings this always begins with "LB", for example "LB12345".)	Image
The Vault, Perceton				55°37′51″N 4°37′15″W	Category B	835	Upload Photo
Chapeltoun Bridge				55°39′50″N 4°33′17″W	Category C(S)	839	Upload Photo
Mid-Buiston				55°39′27″N 4°30′53″W	Category C(S)	846	Upload Photo
Buistonhead				55°39′34″N 4°30′16″W	Category C(S)	847	Upload Photo
Gateway, Annick Lodge				55°38′30″N 4°36′22″W	Category B	114	Upload Photo
West Lambroughton				55°39′20″N 4°33′26″W	Category C(S)	838	Upload Photo
Holmsford Bridge				55°36′17″N 4°36′39″W	Category C(S)	841	Upload Photo
Overton				55°38′00″N 4°35′34″W	Category B	843	Upload Photo
Annick Lodge				55°38′33″N 4°36′34″W	Category A	836	Upload Photo
Springside				55°37′02″N 4°35′31″W	Category B	842	Upload Photo
Townhead Of Lambroughton				55°39′46″N 4°32′23″W	Category B	848	Upload Photo
Session House At Gate Of Churchyard				55°36′35″N 4°37′05″W	Category B	868	Upload Photo
Bridge, Near Annick Lodge Mains				55°38′32″N 4°36′20″W	Category C(S)	837	Upload Photo
Parish Church And Graveyard				55°36′35″N 4°37′06″W	Category B	867	Upload Photo
Stables, Perceton Housing Manager, Irvine Development Corporation				55°37′54″N 4°36′58″W	Category C(S)	834	Upload Photo
Perceton House Irvine Development Corporation				55°37′51″N 4°36′56″W	Category A	833	Upload another image
Cunninghamhead, Stables				55°38′36″N 4°35′39″W	Category B	840	Upload Photo
Cunninghamhead Bridge				55°38′52″N 4°35′03″W	Category C(S)	845	Upload Photo
Perceton Row, Near Dreghorn, K6 Telephone Kiosk				55°37′13″N 4°36′26″W	Category B	849	Upload Photo
Cunninghamhead Mill				55°38′48″N 4°35′04″W	Category C(S)	844	Upload Photo

== Key ==
The scheme for classifying buildings in Scotland is:

- Category A: "buildings of national or international importance, either architectural or historic; or fine, little-altered examples of some particular period, style or building type."
- Category B: "buildings of regional or more than local importance; or major examples of some particular period, style or building type, which may have been altered."
- Category C: "buildings of local importance; lesser examples of any period, style, or building type, as originally constructed or moderately altered; and simple traditional buildings which group well with other listed buildings."

In March 2016 there were 47,288 listed buildings in Scotland. Of these, 8% were Category A, and 50% were Category B, with the remaining 42% being Category C.

== See also ==
- List of listed buildings in North Ayrshire
