= List of listed buildings in West Kilbride, North Ayrshire =

This is a list of listed buildings in the parish of West Kilbride in North Ayrshire, Scotland.

== List ==
Name	Location	Date Listed	Grid Ref. (Note: Sometimes known as OSGB36, the grid reference (where provided) is based on the British national grid reference system used by the Ordnance Survey. • "Guide to National Grid". Ordnance Survey. • "Get-a-map". Ordnance Survey.)	Geo-coordinates	Notes	LB Number (Note: Historic Environment Scotland assign a unique alphanumeric identifier to each designated site in Scotland, for listed buildings this always begins with "LB", for example "LB12345".)	Image
Hunterston House				55°43′31″N 4°52′49″W	Category B	14286	Upload another image
St Andrews (Formerly St Bride's) Church Of Scotland				55°41′46″N 4°51′18″W	Category B	14307	Upload another image
Ruin Of Old Abbey Southannan, Fairlie				55°44′41″N 4°51′16″W	Category B	14311	Upload Photo
Hunterston Gate (North Pillars)				55°43′44″N 4°51′57″W	Category B	14314	Upload Photo
Hunterston Gate (South Pillars)				55°42′41″N 4°52′01″W	Category B	14315	Upload Photo
73 Main Street And 1 Hunterston Road				55°41′44″N 4°51′23″W	Category C(S)	50774	Upload Photo
Carlung House				55°42′05″N 4°52′22″W	Category B	19686	Upload Photo
Law Castle				55°41′46″N 4°50′53″W	Category A	14279	Upload another image
Chapelton Farm				55°40′41″N 4°51′16″W	Category C(S)	14284	Upload Photo
Sea Mill				55°41′03″N 4°51′41″W	Category B	14285	Upload Photo
Walled Garden, Hunterston				55°43′22″N 4°52′48″W	Category C(S)	14288	Upload Photo
Sundial, Kirktonhall				55°41′41″N 4°51′26″W	Category A	14309	Upload Photo
Monument In Cemetery To Dr. Robert Simpson				55°41′56″N 4°51′19″W	Category C(S)	14310	Upload another image
Harbours, Portencross				55°41′58″N 4°54′17″W	Category B	13899	Upload another image
Seamill Centre, Formerly Seamill House, With Lodge, Boundary Walls And Gatepiers				55°41′07″N 4°51′28″W	Category A	43209	Upload Photo
Lawoodhead				55°42′09″N 4°50′42″W	Category B	14283	Upload Photo
Kirktonhall (Offices Of Ayr County Council)				55°41′42″N 4°51′27″W	Category B	14308	Upload another image
West Kilbride Station				55°41′47″N 4°51′06″W	Category B	14312	Upload another image
Hunterston Castle				55°43′22″N 4°52′44″W	Category A	14313	Upload another image
Portencross Castle				55°41′58″N 4°54′18″W	Category A	14280	Upload another image
Well In Front Of Mansion				55°43′32″N 4°52′50″W	Category C(S)	14287	Upload Photo
West Kilbride Barony Parish Church And Graveyard				55°41′43″N 4°51′20″W	Category C(S)	14306	Upload another image
Crosbie Towers				55°42′40″N 4°50′16″W	Category B	14282	Upload another image
West Cottage And Castle Cottage, Portencross				55°41′56″N 4°54′16″W	Category C(S)	14281	Upload Photo
Ritchie Street, Overton Church (Church Of Scotland), Including Boundary Wall, Gatepiers And Gates				55°41′36″N 4°51′38″W	Category B	51402	Upload another image

== Key ==
The scheme for classifying buildings in Scotland is:

- Category A: "buildings of national or international importance, either architectural or historic; or fine, little-altered examples of some particular period, style or building type."
- Category B: "buildings of regional or more than local importance; or major examples of some particular period, style or building type, which may have been altered."
- Category C: "buildings of local importance; lesser examples of any period, style, or building type, as originally constructed or moderately altered; and simple traditional buildings which group well with other listed buildings."

In March 2016 there were 47,288 listed buildings in Scotland. Of these, 8% were Category A, and 50% were Category B, with the remaining 42% being Category C.

== See also ==
- List of listed buildings in North Ayrshire
