= List of listed buildings in Stevenston, North Ayrshire =

This is a list of listed buildings in the parish of Stevenston in North Ayrshire, Scotland.

== List ==
Name	Location	Date Listed	Grid Ref. (Note: Sometimes known as OSGB36, the grid reference (where provided) is based on the British national grid reference system used by the Ordnance Survey. • "Guide to National Grid". Ordnance Survey. • "Get-a-map". Ordnance Survey.)	Geo-coordinates	Notes	LB Number (Note: Historic Environment Scotland assign a unique alphanumeric identifier to each designated site in Scotland, for listed buildings this always begins with "LB", for example "LB12345".)	Image
Kerelaw Castle, Bridge				55°38′55″N 4°45′10″W	Category B	41059	Upload Photo
Hullerhirst And Gatepiers				55°39′08″N 4°44′26″W	Category B	14398	Upload Photo
Parish Church (High) Including Graveyard Gateway				55°38′31″N 4°45′24″W	Category B	41048	Upload Photo
Glencairn Street, Obelisk				55°38′34″N 4°45′40″W	Category B	41056	Upload Photo
Schoolwell Street Manse				55°38′32″N 4°45′26″W	Category B	41049	Upload Photo
Old High Road Mayville				55°38′31″N 4°45′41″W	Category B	41052	Upload Photo
Old High Road, Outbuildings And Byres, Mayville				55°38′30″N 4°45′42″W	Category C(S)	41054	Upload Photo
Hawkhill Farm				55°38′46″N 4°44′17″W	Category C(S)	41062	Upload Photo
Broomhouse				55°38′32″N 4°43′46″W	Category B	19696	Upload Photo
No 21 Schoolwell Street				55°38′31″N 4°45′26″W	Category C(S)	41050	Upload Photo
Main Street Champion Shell Inn				55°38′27″N 4°45′26″W	Category B	41051	Upload Photo
Old High Road, Mayville, Sundial				55°38′30″N 4°45′40″W	Category B	41053	Upload Photo
Old High Road, Gatepiers, Mayville				55°38′29″N 4°45′42″W	Category B	41055	Upload Photo
Ardeer, ICI Plant, "South African Pavilion" (Former ICI Staff Restaurant)				55°37′31″N 4°43′47″W	Category B	19136	Upload another image
Millhill (R Begbie)				55°38′31″N 4°45′19″W	Category C(S)	41057	Upload Photo
Kerelaw Castle				55°38′54″N 4°45′09″W	Category B	41058	Upload Photo
Shore Road Ardeer Parish Church				55°37′59″N 4°45′00″W	Category C(S)	41060	Upload Photo
Mayfield, House Courtyard And Farm Cottage				55°38′41″N 4°46′02″W	Category C(S)	14360	Upload Photo
Haycocks Road, Ardchoille, Formerly Known As Haycocks				55°38′51″N 4°44′40″W	Category C(S)	41061	Upload Photo
Ardeer Mains				55°38′29″N 4°44′18″W	Category C(S)	14397	Upload Photo

== Key ==
The scheme for classifying buildings in Scotland is:

- Category A: "buildings of national or international importance, either architectural or historic; or fine, little-altered examples of some particular period, style or building type."
- Category B: "buildings of regional or more than local importance; or major examples of some particular period, style or building type, which may have been altered."
- Category C: "buildings of local importance; lesser examples of any period, style, or building type, as originally constructed or moderately altered; and simple traditional buildings which group well with other listed buildings."

In March 2016 there were 47,288 listed buildings in Scotland. Of these, 8% were Category A, and 50% were Category B, with the remaining 42% being Category C.

== See also ==
- List of listed buildings in North Ayrshire
