= List of listed buildings in Millport, North Ayrshire =

This is a list of listed buildings in the parish of Millport in North Ayrshire, Scotland.

== List ==
Name	Location	Date listed	Grid ref. (Note: Sometimes known as OSGB36, the grid reference (where provided) is based on the British national grid reference system used by the Ordnance Survey. • "Guide to National Grid". Ordnance Survey. • "Get-a-map". Ordnance Survey.)	Geo-coordinates	Notes	LB number (Note: Historic Environment Scotland assign a unique alphanumeric identifier to each designated site in Scotland, for listed buildings this always begins with "LB", for example "LB12345".)	Image
Devenport Place 14-25 (Odd And Even Numbers)				55°45′18″N 4°55′06″W	Category C(S)	37839	Upload another image See more images
Kelburn Street, Nos. 10, 11, 12 And 13				55°45′17″N 4°55′07″W	Category C(S)	37840	Upload another image See more images
Kelburn Street, Nos. 8 And 9				55°45′17″N 4°55′08″W	Category C(S)	37841	Upload another image See more images
Nos. 12-28 Crighton Street (Even Numbers)				55°44′59″N 4°56′08″W	Category B	37831	Upload Photo
Nos. 4, 6, 8 And 10 Cardiff Street				55°45′05″N 4°56′01″W	Category C(S)	37832	Upload Photo
Nos. 1-7 Clyde Street				55°45′02″N 4°55′59″W	Category C(S)	37833	Upload Photo
Kelburn Street, Nos. 6 And 7				55°45′16″N 4°55′09″W	Category C(S)	37842	Upload another image See more images
Episcopal Cathedral With Collegiate Buildings And Cloister				55°45′20″N 4°55′28″W	Category A	37824	Upload another image See more images
Strahoun Bute Terrace				55°45′09″N 4°56′01″W	Category C(S)	37838	Upload Photo
The Garrison, Including Walled Garden And Entrance Gateways				55°45′13″N 4°55′37″W	Category B	37825	Upload another image See more images
Old Harbour				55°45′07″N 4°55′43″W	Category B	37826	Upload Photo
Springfield, Bute Terrace				55°45′12″N 4°55′55″W	Category B	37836	Upload another image See more images
Seaview, Bute Terrace				55°45′13″N 4°55′53″W	Category C(S)	37837	Upload another image See more images
9, 10 Marine Parade, Eastwood				55°45′19″N 4°54′49″W	Category B	37843	Upload another image See more images
Kirkton House				55°45′19″N 4°56′19″W	Category B	37829	Upload Photo
Bute Terrace, Former United Presbyterian Manse				55°45′16″N 4°55′51″W	Category C(S)	37823	Upload another image See more images
Old Graveyard, Kirkton				55°45′17″N 4°56′15″W	Category B	37827	Upload Photo
Millburn House				55°45′05″N 4°56′08″W	Category B	37830	Upload Photo
No. 9 Quayhead				55°45′03″N 4°55′58″W	Category B	37834	Upload Photo
Fairlie Bank, Bute Terrace				55°45′11″N 4°55′56″W	Category C(S)	37835	Upload another image See more images
Mid-Kirkton				55°45′16″N 4°56′13″W	Category B	37828	Upload Photo

== Key ==
The scheme for classifying buildings in Scotland is:

- Category A: "buildings of national or international importance, either architectural or historic; or fine, little-altered examples of some particular period, style or building type."
- Category B: "buildings of regional or more than local importance; or major examples of some particular period, style or building type, which may have been altered."
- Category C: "buildings of local importance; lesser examples of any period, style, or building type, as originally constructed or moderately altered; and simple traditional buildings which group well with other listed buildings."

In March 2016 there were 47,288 listed buildings in Scotland. Of these, 8% were Category A, and 50% were Category B, with the remaining 42% being Category C.

== See also ==
- List of listed buildings in North Ayrshire
