= List of listed buildings in Kilbride, North Ayrshire =

This is a list of listed buildings in the parish of Kilbride (eastern half of the Isle of Arran) in North Ayrshire, Scotland.

== List ==
Name	Location	Date Listed	Grid Ref. (Note: Sometimes known as OSGB36, the grid reference (where provided) is based on the British national grid reference system used by the Ordnance Survey. • "Guide to National Grid". Ordnance Survey. • "Get-a-map". Ordnance Survey.)	Geo-coordinates	Notes	LB Number (Note: Historic Environment Scotland assign a unique alphanumeric identifier to each designated site in Scotland, for listed buildings this always begins with "LB", for example "LB12345".)	Image
Brodick, 1-8 (Inclusive Nos) Alma Terrace				55°34′32″N 5°08′43″W	Category B	13412	Upload Photo
Brodick, Ormidale Hotel, Including Converted Stable Offices And Gatepiers				55°34′30″N 5°09′19″W	Category C(S)	13424	Upload Photo
Corrie, Free Church, Including Gatepiers And Boundary Wall				55°38′22″N 5°08′21″W	Category B	13436	Upload Photo
Lamlash, Piers And Slipway				55°32′05″N 5°07′26″W	Category B	13449	Upload Photo
Lamlash, Sea Gate, Part Of Former Steamer Pier Complex				55°32′10″N 5°07′22″W	Category C(S)	13450	Upload Photo
Lamlash 1-27 (Inclusive Nos) Hamilton Terrace Including Garden Enclosures				55°32′00″N 5°07′44″W	Category A	13234	Upload another image
Lamlash 1A-24A (Inclusive Nos )Hamilton Terrace				55°32′02″N 5°07′44″W	Category B	13235	Upload Photo
Isle Of Arran, Corrie, Corrie Hotel				55°38′35″N 5°08′22″W	Category B	12883	Upload Photo
Isle Of Arran, Whiting Bay, Arnhall, Including Stable Block				55°29′38″N 5°05′43″W	Category B	12887	Upload Photo
Brodick Castle Estate, Walled Garden, Terraces, Garden Gates, Sundial And Commemorative Gates				55°35′38″N 5°08′56″W	Category A	7508	Upload another image See more images
Isle Of Arran, Brodick, Rosa Bridge, Road Bridge Over Rosa Burn				55°35′05″N 5°09′55″W	Category B	6781	Upload Photo
Brodick, Invercloy, Invercloy House				55°34′39″N 5°08′56″W	Category C(S)	13420	Upload Photo
Brodick, Invercloy, Wooleys Bakers				55°34′38″N 5°08′53″W	Category B	13422	Upload Photo
Brodick, Rosaburn, Arran Heritage Museum, Former School, Including Telephone Kiosk				55°35′01″N 5°09′41″W	Category B	13428	Upload Photo
Lamlash, Former Pier House And Clock Tower				55°32′11″N 5°07′22″W	Category B	13439	Upload Photo
Lamlash, Monamore Bridge, Millhouse				55°31′27″N 5°08′18″W	Category C(S)	13448	Upload Photo
Isle Of Arran, Lamlash, Bellhaven, (Next To Parish Church)				55°31′56″N 5°07′47″W	Category C(S)	12885	Upload Photo
Brodick Castle Estate, South Gates				55°35′07″N 5°09′53″W	Category C(S)	51788	Upload Photo
Brodick, Strabane, Including Stablecourt And Outbuilding				55°35′10″N 5°09′32″W	Category B	13434	Upload Photo
Lamlash, Lamlash And Kilbride Parish Church, Church Hall				55°31′56″N 5°07′49″W	Category B	13447	Upload Photo
Brodick, Cladoch				55°35′31″N 5°09′25″W	Category B	11730	Upload Photo
The Bay Hotel, Lamlash				55°32′15″N 5°07′28″W	Category C(S)	7511	Upload Photo
Brodick, Douglas Row, Douglas Place				55°34′49″N 5°09′37″W	Category B	7512	Upload Photo
Isle Of Arran, Whiting Bay, Silverbank				55°29′02″N 5°05′41″W	Category C(S)	6791	Upload Photo
Isle Of Arran, Whiting Bay, Stewart Memorial Church				55°30′01″N 5°05′35″W	Category B	6792	Upload another image
Isle Of Arran, Whiting Bay, Auchencairn, Rose Cottage				55°30′18″N 5°06′08″W	Category B	6773	Upload Photo
Isle Of Arran, Whiting Bay, Burlington House (Hotel), Including House To Rear, Gatepiers And Boundary Walls				55°29′50″N 5°05′40″W	Category C(S)	6774	Upload Photo
Isle Of Arran, Brodick, Carrick Lodge, (Former Manse)				55°34′21″N 5°08′18″W	Category C(S)	6779	Upload Photo
Isle Of Arran, Brodick, Rosa Bridge, Drinking Fountain				55°35′03″N 5°09′58″W	Category C(S)	6780	Upload Photo
Isle Of Arran, Corrie, Craegard, Including Cottage/Stable/Slaughterhouse And Boundary Wall				55°37′58″N 5°08′17″W	Category B	6783	Upload Photo
Brodick, Near Glensburig Bridge, Arran Estates, (Former Manse)				55°35′07″N 5°10′05″W	Category B	13416	Upload Photo
Brodick, Invercloy, Pharmacy (Former Post Office), Including Gates And Railings				55°34′38″N 5°09′04″W	Category C(S)	13421	Upload Photo
Brodick, Rosaburn, Arran Heritage Museum, Rosaburn House				55°35′00″N 5°09′39″W	Category B	13429	Upload Photo
Brodick, War Memorial, Including Railings				55°34′39″N 5°09′14″W	Category C(S)	13435	Upload Photo
Lamlash, Glenkiln Farmhouse, Including Adjoining Cottages				55°31′34″N 5°08′41″W	Category C(S)	13440	Upload Photo
Lamlash, Whitehouse Lodge				55°31′55″N 5°07′47″W	Category C(S)	13451	Upload Photo
Corrie Harbour				55°38′39″N 5°08′22″W	Category C(S)	7487	Upload Photo
Cromla House, Corrie				55°38′30″N 5°08′23″W	Category C(S)	7504	Upload Photo
High Corrie, Seaview And Bothy, Langstane, Nia-Roo, Goatfell Cottage, The Bothy, Burnbank, Finlay's Cottage, Mclellan's Cottage				55°38′02″N 5°08′35″W	Category B	7505	Upload Photo
Monument To Duke Of Hamilton In Front Of School, Brodick				55°34′54″N 5°09′31″W	Category B	7506	Upload Photo
Kilmichael House				55°34′03″N 5°10′10″W	Category B	7510	Upload Photo
Isle Of Arran, Whiting Bay, Stewart Memorial Church, War Memorial				55°30′00″N 5°05′36″W	Category C(S)	6788	Upload Photo
Brodick Castle Estate, Main Gates And Entrance Drive				55°35′39″N 5°08′45″W	Category B	51787	Upload Photo
Mid-Sannox				55°39′55″N 5°09′35″W	Category B	13651	Upload Photo
The Lodge, Lochranza				55°42′19″N 5°16′57″W	Category C(S)	13652	Upload Photo
Brodick, Arran Library And Brodick Hall				55°34′40″N 5°09′09″W	Category B	13413	Upload Photo
Brodick, Brodick Old Quay				55°35′31″N 5°09′01″W	Category B	13414	Upload Photo
Brodick, Invercloy, Bank Of Scotland, Including Bank House And Boundary Wall				55°34′39″N 5°09′02″W	Category C(S)	13418	Upload Photo
Brodick, Invercloy, The Brodick Bazaar				55°34′38″N 5°08′55″W	Category C(S)	13419	Upload Photo
Brodick, Invercloy, Shop And Flat Adjoining Wooleys Bakers				55°34′38″N 5°08′53″W	Category B	13423	Upload Photo
Brodick, Roman Catholic Church				55°34′31″N 5°08′28″W	Category C(S)	13427	Upload Photo
Corrie, Heathfield				55°38′21″N 5°08′24″W	Category C(S)	13437	Upload Photo
Lamlash 'Crafts Made In Arran' Shop				55°32′07″N 5°07′30″W	Category B	13310	Upload Photo
Lamlash, Park Road, Dalgorm Including Boundary Wall				55°31′59″N 5°07′52″W	Category B	13236	Upload Photo
Lamlash, Former St George's Uf Church				55°32′23″N 5°07′13″W	Category B	12994	Upload Photo
Isle Of Arran, Corrie, Villa To North Of Corrie Hotel, Including Boundary Wall And Gatepiers				55°38′37″N 5°08′22″W	Category B	12884	Upload Photo
Brodick Castle Estate, Ice House				55°35′34″N 5°09′17″W	Category C(S)	6775	Upload Photo
Isle Of Arran, Brodick, Rosaburn, Greyholme				55°34′57″N 5°09′28″W	Category B	6782	Upload Photo
Isle Of Arran, Whiting Bay, Invermay Hotel, Including Gatepiers And Boundary Walls				55°29′50″N 5°05′40″W	Category C(S)	6786	Upload Photo
Brodick Castle Estate, Bavarian Summerhouse				55°35′34″N 5°08′56″W	Category A	47599	Upload another image
Brodick Castle Estate, Sylvania				55°35′31″N 5°09′29″W	Category C(S)	51789	Upload Photo
Brodick, Parish Church, Including Church Hall And Railings				55°34′35″N 5°09′23″W	Category B	13425	Upload Photo
Brodick, Primary School				55°34′55″N 5°09′33″W	Category B	13426	Upload another image
Brodick, Rosaburn, Arran Heritage Museum, Cottage				55°35′00″N 5°09′39″W	Category C(S)	13431	Upload Photo
Lamlash, Park Road, Rose Cottage (Formerly Nurses Cottage) Including Boundary Wall				55°31′59″N 5°07′51″W	Category B	13237	Upload Photo
Kilbride Chapel And Graveyard				55°32′39″N 5°07′14″W	Category B	7484	Upload Photo
Isle Of Arran, Whiting Bay, Stewart Memorial Church, Manse				55°30′01″N 5°05′34″W	Category C(S)	6793	Upload Photo
Isle Of Arran, Whiting Bay, Arnhall Lodge				55°29′36″N 5°05′41″W	Category C(S)	6772	Upload Photo
Brodick Castle Estate, The Nursery (Lower Walled Garden), Gardener's Cottage And Ancillary Buildings Attached To Nursery Walls				55°35′30″N 5°09′17″W	Category C(S)	6777	Upload Photo
Brodick Castle Estate, Cnocan Burn Road Bridge				55°35′37″N 5°09′58″W	Category B	6778	Upload Photo
Isle Of Arran, Whiting Bay, Cameronia Hotel, Including Gatepiers And Boundary Walls				55°29′49″N 5°05′40″W	Category C(S)	6784	Upload Photo
Isle Of Arran, Whiting Bay, Grange House (Hotel), Including Boundary Walls				55°29′46″N 5°05′39″W	Category B	6785	Upload Photo
Isle Of Arran, Whiting Bay, Former Parish Church				55°29′42″N 5°05′39″W	Category C(S)	6787	Upload Photo
Isle Of Arran, Whiting Bay, Village Hall				55°29′23″N 5°05′47″W	Category C(S)	6789	Upload Photo
Lamlash, The Lookout, Including Boundary Walls, Gatepiers And Railings				55°32′08″N 5°07′32″W	Category C(S)	49200	Upload Photo
Lamlash, Lamlash Community Centre				55°31′51″N 5°08′05″W	Category C(S)	49536	Upload Photo
Brodick, Near Glensburig Bridge, Graveyard				55°35′02″N 5°10′11″W	Category C(S)	13417	Upload Photo
Brodick, Rosaburn, Arran Heritage Museum, Roadside Cottage				55°35′00″N 5°09′39″W	Category B	13430	Upload Photo
Lamlash, Lamlash And Kilbride Parish Church, Including Cross And Baptismal Font, Former Closet, Boundary Wall, Piers And Railings				55°31′56″N 5°07′48″W	Category A	13441	Upload Photo
Corrie Church				55°38′48″N 5°08′32″W	Category B	7485	Upload Photo
Congregational Chapel, Sannox				55°39′48″N 5°09′17″W	Category B	7486	Upload Photo
Brodick Castle Estate, Castle Cottage And Greenhyde Cottage				55°35′42″N 5°09′08″W	Category C(S)	6795	Upload Photo
Brodick, Douglas Hotel				55°34′33″N 5°08′29″W	Category C(S)	13415	Upload Photo
Brodick, Rosaburn, Arran Heritage Museum, Stable				55°35′00″N 5°09′39″W	Category C(S)	13432	Upload Photo
Brodick, Royal Bank Of Scotland				55°34′37″N 5°08′50″W	Category C(S)	13433	Upload Photo
Lamlash, Former Manse Of St George's United Free Church, Including Boundary Wall				55°32′24″N 5°07′12″W	Category B	13438	Upload Photo
Isle Of Arran, Lamlash, Seafield, Including Boundary Walls And Gateposts				55°32′31″N 5°06′59″W	Category B	12886	Upload Photo
Brodick Castle Estate, Brodick Castle				55°35′38″N 5°09′03″W	Category A	7507	Upload another image
Isle Of Arran, Whiting Bay, St Columba's				55°29′40″N 5°05′40″W	Category B	6790	Upload Photo
Brodick Estate, The Kennels Including House And Outbuildings				55°35′38″N 5°09′49″W	Category B	6776	Upload Photo

== Key ==
The scheme for classifying buildings in Scotland is:

- Category A: "buildings of national or international importance, either architectural or historic; or fine, little-altered examples of some particular period, style or building type."
- Category B: "buildings of regional or more than local importance; or major examples of some particular period, style or building type, which may have been altered."
- Category C: "buildings of local importance; lesser examples of any period, style, or building type, as originally constructed or moderately altered; and simple traditional buildings which group well with other listed buildings."

In March 2016 there were 47,288 listed buildings in Scotland. Of these, 8% were Category A, and 50% were Category B, with the remaining 42% being Category C.

== See also ==
- List of listed buildings in North Ayrshire
