= List of listed buildings in Kilwinning, North Ayrshire =

This is a list of listed buildings in the parish of Kilwinning in North Ayrshire, Scotland.

== List ==
Name	Location	Date listed	Grid ref. (Note: Sometimes known as OSGB36, the grid reference (where provided) is based on the British national grid reference system used by the Ordnance Survey. • "Guide to National Grid". Ordnance Survey. • "Get-a-map". Ordnance Survey.)	Geo-coordinates	Notes	LB number (Note: Historic Environment Scotland assign a unique alphanumeric identifier to each designated site in Scotland, for listed buildings this always begins with "LB", for example "LB12345".)	Image
Kilwinning Abbey				55°39′12″N 4°41′54″W	Category A	36237	Upload Photo
Groatholm Bridge				55°40′18″N 4°42′38″W	Category C(S)	13660	Upload Photo
Walled Garden, Monkcastle				55°41′10″N 4°43′07″W	Category C(S)	7600	Upload Photo
By Kilwinning, Mid Auchenmade Farm And Outbuildings				55°41′56″N 4°37′37″W	Category C(S)	49229	Upload Photo
Detached Church Tower				55°39′12″N 4°41′57″W	Category B	36236	Upload Photo
Monk Castle				55°41′22″N 4°43′10″W	Category B	13661	Upload Photo
Montgreenan				55°39′57″N 4°38′08″W	Category A	7577	Upload Photo
Mains, Montgreennan				55°40′06″N 4°38′07″W	Category B	7578	Upload Photo
Erskine Church				55°39′16″N 4°41′57″W	Category C(S)	36238	Upload Photo
Dalgarven Mill				55°40′34″N 4°42′37″W	Category B	13659	Upload Photo
Abbey Church And Churchyard				55°39′12″N 4°41′54″W	Category B	36235	Upload Photo
Eglinton Castle				55°38′40″N 4°40′00″W	Category C(S)	7569	Upload Photo
Dovecot, Home Farm				55°38′18″N 4°39′27″W	Category B	7572	Upload Photo
Rose Bank And Townfoot Cottages, Dalgarven				55°40′38″N 4°42′50″W	Category C(S)	7576	Upload Photo
Eglinton Country Park, Racquet Hall				55°38′31″N 4°40′20″W	Category B	7582	Upload Photo
Stables, Monkcastle				55°41′10″N 4°43′10″W	Category C(S)	7599	Upload Photo
Clonbeith Castle				55°40′30″N 4°38′39″W	Category B	7602	Upload Photo
Kilwinning Gates				55°38′42″N 4°41′08″W	Category B	7575	Upload Photo
West Lodge				55°39′41″N 4°38′05″W	Category B	7579	Upload Photo
Mercat Cross				55°39′14″N 4°41′47″W	Category A	47598	Upload another image
Kilwinning Bridge				55°39′15″N 4°41′41″W	Category C(S)	36239	Upload Photo
Nos 24, 26 And 28 Main Street				55°39′15″N 4°41′47″W	Category B	36240	Upload Photo
Monkredding House				55°40′24″N 4°40′00″W	Category B	7567	Upload Photo
Stables, Eglinton Castle				55°38′36″N 4°40′17″W	Category B	7571	Upload Photo
Walled Kitchen Gardens				55°38′38″N 4°40′36″W	Category C(S)	7574	Upload Photo
Garden Cottage				55°38′42″N 4°40′54″W	Category B	13658	Upload Photo
Summerhouse, Monkredding				55°40′23″N 4°40′06″W	Category C(S)	7568	Upload Photo
Park Bridge				55°38′38″N 4°40′27″W	Category B	7573	Upload Photo
Monkcastle				55°41′08″N 4°43′06″W	Category B	7598	Upload Photo
Lodge, Monkcastle				55°40′59″N 4°42′55″W	Category C(S)	7601	Upload Photo
Tournament Bridge				55°38′41″N 4°40′12″W	Category B	7570	Upload Photo
East Lodge				55°40′03″N 4°37′36″W	Category B	7580	Upload Photo
Boat House				55°39′47″N 4°38′07″W	Category B	7581	Upload Photo

== Key ==
The scheme for classifying buildings in Scotland is:

- Category A: "buildings of national or international importance, either architectural or historic; or fine, little-altered examples of some particular period, style or building type."
- Category B: "buildings of regional or more than local importance; or major examples of some particular period, style or building type, which may have been altered."
- Category C: "buildings of local importance; lesser examples of any period, style, or building type, as originally constructed or moderately altered; and simple traditional buildings which group well with other listed buildings."

In March 2016 there were 47,288 listed buildings in Scotland. Of these, 8% were Category A, and 50% were Category B, with the remaining 42% being Category C.

== See also ==
- List of listed buildings in North Ayrshire
