= List of listed buildings in North Ayrshire =

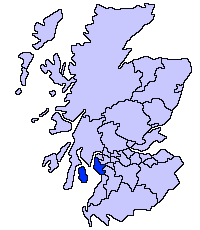
North Ayrshire shown within Scotland

This is a list of listed buildings in North Ayrshire. The list is split out by parish.

- List of listed buildings in Ardrossan, North Ayrshire
- List of listed buildings in Beith, North Ayrshire
- List of listed buildings in Cumbrae, North Ayrshire
- List of listed buildings in Dalry, North Ayrshire
- List of listed buildings in Dreghorn, North Ayrshire
- List of listed buildings in Dundonald, North Ayrshire
- List of listed buildings in Irvine, North Ayrshire
- List of listed buildings in Kilbirnie, North Ayrshire
- List of listed buildings in Kilbride, North Ayrshire
- List of listed buildings in Kilmory, North Ayrshire
- List of listed buildings in Kilwinning, North Ayrshire
- List of listed buildings in Largs, North Ayrshire
- List of listed buildings in Millport, North Ayrshire
- List of listed buildings in Saltcoats, North Ayrshire
- List of listed buildings in Stevenston, North Ayrshire
- List of listed buildings in West Kilbride, North Ayrshire

== See also ==
- Scheduled monuments in North Ayrshire
