= Beith Townhouse =

Municipal building in Beith, Scotland

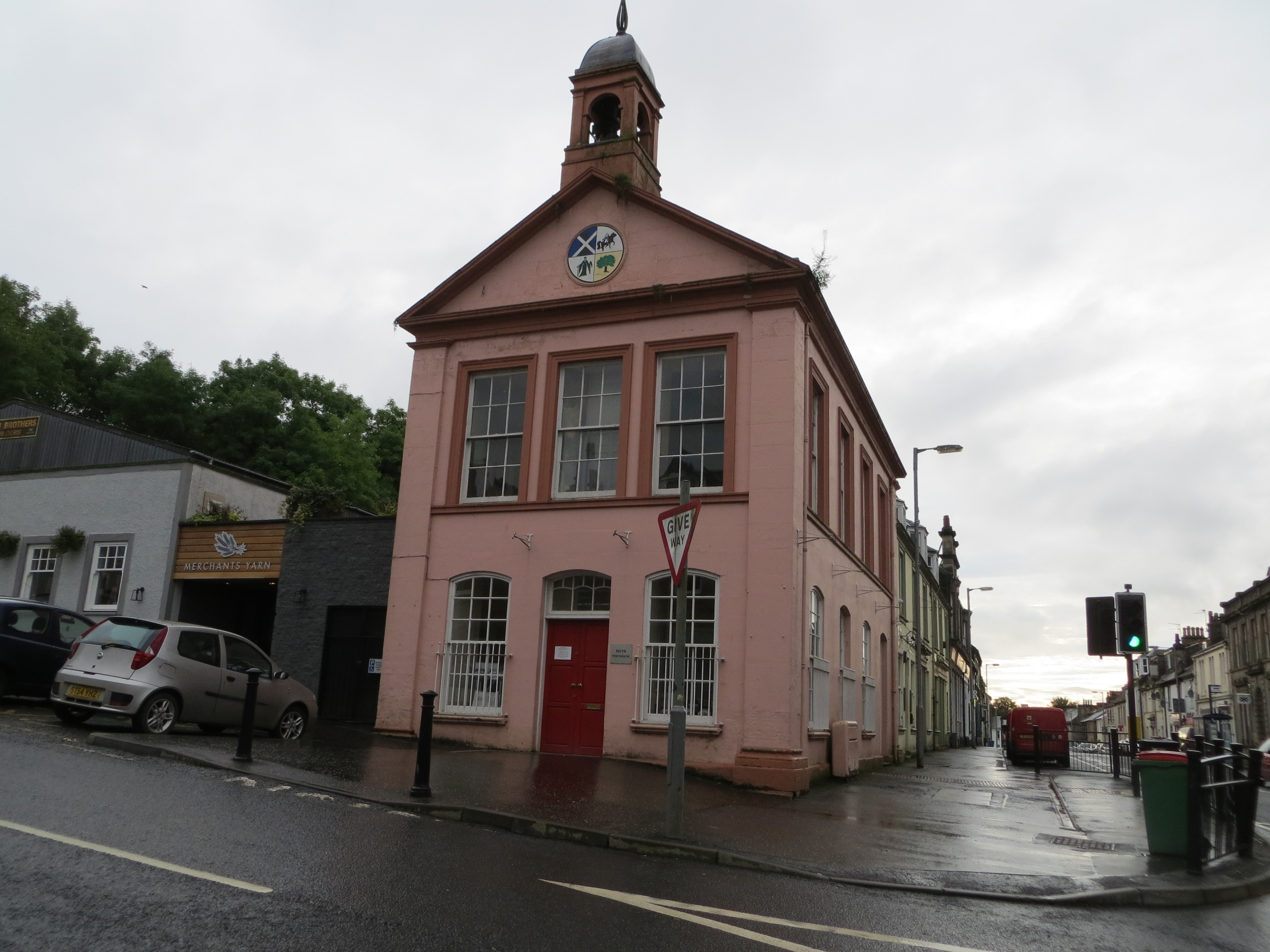
- Beith Townhouse

- Shown in North Ayrshire
- 55.7501°N 4.6334°W
- Location: The Strand, Beith

History
- Built: 1817

Site notes
- Architect: William Dobie
- Architectural style: Neoclassical style

Listed Building – Category B
- Official name: 2 The Strand, Former Town House
- Designated: 14 April 1971
- Reference no.: LB937

Beith Townhouse is a municipal building in The Strand, Beith, North Ayrshire, Scotland. The structure, which is currently used as an information and heritage centre, is a Category B listed building.

== History ==
The first municipal building in Beith was a tolbooth in The Strand which was completed in 1636. It accommodated prison cells on the ground floor and the parish school on the first floor. Both the prisoners and the schoolchildren were transferred to Braehead in 1768 and the building was subsequently used as stabling for the horses of customers staying at the Saracen's Head Hotel. By the early 19th century, the tolbooth was in such a dilapidated state that a group of local merchants led by William Wilson decided to raise money by public subscription with a view to erecting a new building on the same site.

The foundation stone for the new building was laid on 22 May 1817. It was designed by William Dobie in the neoclassical style, built in painted ashlar sandstone and was completed later that year. The design involved a symmetrical main frontage of three bays facing onto The Strand. The ground floor featured a segmental headed doorway with a fanlight, flanked by a pair of segmental headed windows, while the first floor was fenestrated by three square headed sash windows. Pilasters were erected at the edges of the outer bays to support a pediment with a coat of arms in the tympanum. At roof level, there was a central bellcote with a ogive-shaped roof and a weather vane. Internally, the principal room on the first floor was the assembly hall, while the ground floor accommodated two shops, one of which was let as an ironmonger's shop from 1862 until the end of the century. There was a prison cell for incarcerating petty criminals under the stairs.

A bell for the bellcote was donated by George Sheddon, a partner in the firm of the trading firm of Robert Sheddon & Sons: it was cast by Thomas Mears of Whitechapel Bell Foundry and installed in the bellcote in 1823. The building remained in the ownership of the subscribers and was managed a committee of magistrates and local gentry until 1838.

The building subsequently fell under the management of the local parish council. However, following the re-organisation of local government in 1975, the building came into the ownership of the newly-formed Cunninghame District Council which used it as offices for the delivery of local services. That use ceased in the late 1980s and the building fell vacant for the remainder of the 20th century. In the early 21st century, it was used as temporary offices for local businesses undergoing refurbishment. Following the introduction of unitary authorities in 1996, ownership passed to North Ayrshire Council. The Beith Cultural and Heritage Society, a charity founded in 2006, took a lease on the building from North Ayrshire Council in 2010. After completion of an extensive programme of refurbishment works, the ground floor of the building was re-opened as an information and heritage centre in April 2011. Further works to make to building fully watertight were then completed in 2014.

== See also ==
- List of listed buildings in Beith, North Ayrshire
