= List of listed buildings in Beith, North Ayrshire =

This is a list of listed buildings in the parish of Beith in North Ayrshire, Scotland.

== List ==
Name	Location	Date Listed	Grid Ref. (Note: Sometimes known as OSGB36, the grid reference (where provided) is based on the British national grid reference system used by the Ordnance Survey. • "Guide to National Grid". Ordnance Survey. • "Get-a-map". Ordnance Survey.)	Geo-coordinates	Notes	LB Number (Note: Historic Environment Scotland assign a unique alphanumeric identifier to each designated site in Scotland, for listed buildings this always begins with "LB", for example "LB12345".)	Image
25-31 (Odd Nos) Eglinton Street, former Post Office				55°45′00″N 4°38′02″W	Category C(S)	911	Upload another image
10 and 12 Eglinton Street, Saracen's Head				55°45′02″N 4°38′00″W	Category B	921	Upload another image
14 and 16 Eglinton Street				55°45′01″N 4°38′01″W	Category C(S)	922	Upload Photo
2-6 (Even Nos) Reform Street				55°45′05″N 4°37′57″W	Category B	934	Upload Photo
2 and 2A Barrmill Road, Knockbuckle and Knockbuckle Cottage, including Boundary Walls and Gatepiers				55°44′56″N 4°37′53″W	Category B	938	Upload Photo
Wilson Street, Beith Trinity Church (Church Of Scotland), including Hall, Boundary Walls, Railings and Gatepiers				55°45′16″N 4°37′43″W	Category C(S)	942	Upload another image
Woodside Farm, formerly Stables to Woodside House				55°45′54″N 4°38′03″W	Category B	945	Upload Photo
Wester Highgate Farm and Highgate House, including Original Outbuildings and Walled Garden				55°44′06″N 4°33′54″W	Category B	962	Upload Photo
Barrmill, Dunlop Road, Giffen Mill and Millhouse				55°43′41″N 4°35′51″W	Category B	876	Upload Photo
29 Braehead				55°45′01″N 4°37′57″W	Category C(S)	880	Upload Photo
Bigholm Road, Hamilfield, including Walled Garden and Boundary Walls				55°45′19″N 4°37′39″W	Category B	881	Upload Photo
Cuff Farm, including Boundary Walls, Gatepiers and Gates				55°45′22″N 4°35′17″W	Category C(S)	49728	Upload Photo
Janefield Place, War Memorial				55°45′16″N 4°38′07″W	Category C(S)	49738	Upload another image
Gateside, Bog Hall, including former Farm Buildings to Rear				55°45′07″N 4°36′42″W	Category C(S)	49732	Upload another image
66 Eglinton Street				55°44′59″N 4°38′11″W	Category C(S)	894	Upload Photo
Hazelhead				55°44′34″N 4°34′36″W	Category C(S)	905	Upload Photo
53 and 55 Main Street, The Smugglers Tavern				55°45′07″N 4°37′53″W	Category B	931	Upload Photo
Mitchell Street Roman Catholic Church (Former United Free), Including Gates, Gatepiers And Boundary Walls				55°45′08″N 4°37′50″W	Category C(S)	933	Upload another image
5-9 (Odd Nos) The Strand				55°45′00″N 4°37′59″W	Category C(S)	935	Upload Photo
35 Wilson Street				55°45′10″N 4°37′50″W	Category C(S)	940	Upload Photo
Easter Highgate including Boundary Walls, Railings and Gatepiers				55°44′02″N 4°33′48″W	Category B	958	Upload Photo
31 Braehead, Clydesdale Bank, including Boundary Walls				55°45′00″N 4°37′56″W	Category B	879	Upload another image
35A Wilson Street, Newton House				55°45′11″N 4°37′49″W	Category C(S)	117	Upload Photo
64 Eglinton Street, including Outbuilding				55°44′59″N 4°38′11″W	Category B	893	Upload Photo
Geilsland Road, Geilsland Church of Scotland School				55°44′50″N 4°37′24″W	Category B	901	Upload Photo
Hessilhead				55°44′34″N 4°34′27″W	Category C(S)	906	Upload Photo
1 Glebe Road, The Old Manse, including Boundary Walls, Gatepiers and Railings				55°44′54″N 4°38′09″W	Category B	918	Upload Photo
1620 (Even Nos) Main Street				55°45′05″N 4°37′55″W	Category C(S)	924	Upload Photo
22 and 24 Main Street				55°45′05″N 4°37′55″W	Category C(S)	925	Upload Photo
57-61 (Odd Nos) Main Street				55°45′07″N 4°37′53″W	Category C(S)	932	Upload Photo
12 The Strand, Including Boundary Walls				55°44′59″N 4°37′59″W	Category B	936	Upload Photo
2 The Strand, former Townhouse				55°45′00″N 4°38′01″W	Category B	937	Upload another image
Balgray Barn				55°44′16″N 4°35′31″W	Category B	875	Upload another image
24-28 (Even Nos) The Cross				55°45′02″N 4°37′59″W	Category B	884	Upload Photo
44 Eglinton Street				55°45′00″N 4°38′05″W	Category B	888	Upload Photo
Arran Crescent, The Meadows, including Meadows Cottage (Former Service Wing)				55°45′20″N 4°37′47″W	Category B	49725	Upload Photo
Gateside, Main Street, Patrick Memorial Hall				55°44′53″N 4°36′28″W	Category C(S)	49735	Upload Photo
32 and 34 Main Street, Blackwood The Butchers'				55°45′05″N 4°37′54″W	Category C(S)	49740	Upload Photo
63 Wilson Street, Dunlop Cottage, including Boundary Walls				55°45′14″N 4°37′47″W	Category C(S)	49742	Upload Photo
65 Wilson Street, Barrington House, including Former Coachhouse, Boundary Walls, Gatepiers and Gates				55°45′15″N 4°37′47″W	Category B	49743	Upload Photo
74 Eglinton Street				55°44′58″N 4°38′13″W	Category B	897	Upload Photo
Threepwood Road, The Courtyard, (Former Grangehill Stables And Kennels)				55°45′22″N 4°37′15″W	Category B	903	Upload Photo
13-17 (Odd Nos) Eglinton Street, Anderson Hotel				55°45′00″N 4°38′02″W	Category B	910	Upload another image
33 And 35 Eglinton Street				55°44′59″N 4°38′03″W	Category B	912	Upload Photo
43 Eglinton Street				55°45′00″N 4°38′05″W	Category C(S)	915	Upload Photo
45 Eglinton Street				55°44′59″N 4°38′05″W	Category C(S)	916	Upload Photo
26-30 (Even Nos) Main Street				55°45′05″N 4°37′54″W	Category B	926	Upload Photo
Middleton				55°44′16″N 4°33′25″W	Category C(S)	960	Upload Photo
The Cross, Old Parish Church and Burial Ground, including Vault and Boundary Walls				55°45′03″N 4°37′59″W	Category C(S)	882	Upload another image
18-22 (Even Nos) Eglinton Street, Irvine's The Baker				55°45′01″N 4°38′01″W	Category C(S)	885	Upload Photo
76 Eglinton Street, Including Boundary Walls And Ancillary Buildings				55°44′57″N 4°38′15″W	Category B	116	Upload Photo
Balgray Cottage				55°44′16″N 4°35′34″W	Category C(S)	49726	Upload Photo
Barrmill Road, Gatepiers, Railings And Boundary Walls To Former Spier's School				55°44′40″N 4°37′36″W	Category C(S)	49727	Upload Photo
Gateside, 49 Main Street, Drissaig				55°44′53″N 4°36′27″W	Category C(S)	49734	Upload Photo
Gateside, 23 Main Street				55°44′52″N 4°36′34″W	Category C(S)	49733	Upload Photo
19-23 (Odd Nos) Eglinton Street				55°45′00″N 4°38′02″W	Category B	4851	Upload Photo
72 Eglinton Street				55°44′58″N 4°38′13″W	Category B	896	Upload Photo
9 Eglinton Street and 1, 3 The Strand				55°45′01″N 4°37′59″W	Category C(S)	909	Upload Photo
37 Eglinton Street, including Stairs, Boundary Walls, Railings and Gatepiers to Rear				55°45′00″N 4°38′04″W	Category B	913	Upload Photo
2 and 4 Eglinton Street				55°45′02″N 4°37′59″W	Category C(S)	919	Upload Photo
6 and 8 Eglinton Street				55°45′02″N 4°38′00″W	Category C(S)	920	Upload Photo
4 Barrmill Road, Taynish, including Boundary Walls Railings and Gatepiers				55°44′55″N 4°37′52″W	Category B	939	Upload Photo
20 and 22 The Cross				55°45′02″N 4°38′00″W	Category B	883	Upload Photo
40 and 42 Eglinton Street				55°45′01″N 4°38′04″W	Category C(S)	887	Upload Photo
70 Eglinton Street				55°44′58″N 4°38′13″W	Category C(S)	895	Upload Photo
Drumbuie Farm				55°43′11″N 4°37′10″W	Category B	899	Upload Photo
Drumbuie House and Detached Barn, including adjacent Byre				55°43′12″N 4°37′07″W	Category B	900	Upload Photo
39 and 41 Eglinton Street				55°45′00″N 4°38′04″W	Category C(S)	914	Upload Photo
35-45 (Odd Nos) Main Street, Beith Library				55°45′06″N 4°37′55″W	Category B	930	Upload Photo
Woodside House, including Boundary Walls and Gatepiers				55°45′49″N 4°38′07″W	Category A	943	Upload another image See more images
Woodside South Lodge				55°45′34″N 4°38′20″W	Category C(S)	944	Upload Photo
32 Eglinton Street, Bank Of Scotland				55°45′01″N 4°38′03″W	Category B	886	Upload another image
41 Laigh Road and 43 Woodside Road, Victoria Villa, including Boundary Walls and Gatepiers				55°45′15″N 4°38′00″W	Category B	49739	Upload another image
60 Eglinton Street				55°44′59″N 4°38′09″W	Category C(S)	891	Upload Photo
62 Eglinton Street, Whang House, including Ruined Chapel to Rear, Boundary Walls and Gatepiers				55°44′59″N 4°38′10″W	Category B	892	Upload another image
Head Street, former United Free Church, including Boundary Walls, Railings, Gates and Gatepiers				55°45′03″N 4°37′39″W	Category B	898	Upload another image
Threepwood Road, Grangehill Walled Garden and Doocot				55°45′24″N 4°37′11″W	Category C(S)	902	Upload Photo
30 The Cross				55°45′02″N 4°37′59″W	Category B	908	Upload Photo
87 Eglinton Street, including Boundary Walls and Outbuilding to Rear				55°44′54″N 4°38′14″W	Category B	917	Upload Photo
Kirk Road, High Church, including Boundary Walls, Gatepiers and Gates				55°44′58″N 4°37′53″W	Category B	923	Upload another image See more images
58-62 (Even Nos) Main Street				55°45′07″N 4°37′52″W	Category C(S)	927	Upload Photo
15-19 (Odd Nos) Main Street, including Return to Reform Street and Former Bakery Buildings to Rear				55°45′05″N 4°37′56″W	Category C(S)	929	Upload Photo
Gatend Byre, Gatend Farm				55°43′16″N 4°37′00″W	Category B	49731	Upload Photo
High Orchard				55°44′13″N 4°33′00″W	Category C(S)	959	Upload Photo
Willowyard				55°44′48″N 4°39′16″W	Category B	963	Upload another image See more images
46 Eglinton Street				55°45′00″N 4°38′06″W	Category B	889	Upload Photo
10 Dalry Road				55°44′54″N 4°38′20″W	Category C(S)	49730	Upload Photo
12 Glebe Road, Craigallan				55°44′50″N 4°38′12″W	Category B	49736	Upload Photo
31 Head Street, including Former Byre to Rear				55°45′05″N 4°37′44″W	Category C(S)	49737	Upload Photo
17 and 19 Wilson Street				55°45′09″N 4°37′51″W	Category C(S)	49741	Upload Photo

== Key ==
The scheme for classifying buildings in Scotland is:

- Category A: "buildings of national or international importance, either architectural or historic; or fine, little-altered examples of some particular period, style or building type."
- Category B: "buildings of regional or more than local importance; or major examples of some particular period, style or building type, which may have been altered."
- Category C: "buildings of local importance; lesser examples of any period, style, or building type, as originally constructed or moderately altered; and simple traditional buildings which group well with other listed buildings."

In March 2016 there were 47,288 listed buildings in Scotland. Of these, 8% were Category A, and 50% were Category B, with the remaining 42% being Category C.

== See also ==
- List of listed buildings in North Ayrshire
- Scheduled monuments in North Ayrshire
