= List of listed buildings in Kilbirnie, North Ayrshire =

This is a list of listed buildings in the parish of Kilbirnie in North Ayrshire, Scotland.

== List ==
Name	Location	Date Listed	Grid Ref. (Note: Sometimes known as OSGB36, the grid reference (where provided) is based on the British national grid reference system used by the Ordnance Survey. • "Guide to National Grid". Ordnance Survey. • "Get-a-map". Ordnance Survey.)	Geo-coordinates	Notes	LB Number (Note: Historic Environment Scotland assign a unique alphanumeric identifier to each designated site in Scotland, for listed buildings this always begins with "LB", for example "LB12345".)	Image
Redheugh				55°45′52″N 4°40′55″W	Category B	7502	Upload Photo
Kilbirnie 49, 51, 53 Main Street				55°45′17″N 4°41′07″W	Category B	7514	Upload Photo
Kilbirnie 63 Main Street Garnock Labour Club				55°45′16″N 4°41′08″W	Category C(S)	7516	Upload Photo
Kilbirnie 81, 83, 85 Main Street				55°45′15″N 4°41′08″W	Category C(S)	7518	Upload Photo
Auchencloigh				55°45′27″N 4°42′53″W	Category C(S)	7488	Upload Photo
Redheugh Lodge & Gatepiers				55°45′42″N 4°40′53″W	Category B	7503	Upload Photo
Kilbirnie Main Street Memorial Statue To William Walker				55°45′18″N 4°41′08″W	Category B	7513	Upload Photo
Kilbirnie 55, 57 Main Street				55°45′17″N 4°41′08″W	Category C(S)	7515	Upload Photo
Kilbirnie 80, 82, 84 Main Street				55°45′15″N 4°41′09″W	Category C(S)	7522	Upload Photo
Kilbirnie Maybole Street Stoneyholm Mill And Gate Piers				55°45′19″N 4°41′00″W	Category B	7523	Upload Photo
Ladyland Castle And Garden Walls				55°47′07″N 4°40′33″W	Category B	7531	Upload Photo
Birtlebog				55°45′23″N 4°43′55″W	Category B	7489	Upload Photo
Kilbirnie Auld Kirk And Cemetery Walls				55°44′48″N 4°41′11″W	Category A	7492	Upload Photo
Kilbirnie 34, 36 Bridgend				55°45′21″N 4°41′02″W	Category C(S)	7494	Upload Photo
Kilbirnie 67, 69, 71 Main Street				55°45′16″N 4°41′07″W	Category B	7517	Upload Photo
Kilbirnie 50-52 Main Street Royal Bank Building				55°45′17″N 4°41′09″W	Category C(S)	7520	Upload Photo
Kilbirnie Newton Street/Montgomerieston Street Eglinton Inn				55°45′13″N 4°41′09″W	Category C(S)	7526	Upload Photo
Kilbirnie 7, 9 Townhead				55°45′27″N 4°41′11″W	Category C(S)	7529	Upload Photo
Kilbirnie, Bridgend, Radio City, Including Gatepiers, Boundary Walls, Railings, Gatepiers And Archway				55°45′22″N 4°41′06″W	Category C(S)	47121	Upload Photo
Glengarnock Castle				55°46′48″N 4°41′45″W	Category B	7491	Upload Photo
Kilbirnie 28 Cochrane Street				55°45′19″N 4°41′23″W	Category B	7495	Upload Photo
Ladyland Garden Sundial				55°47′08″N 4°40′33″W	Category B	7498	Upload Photo
Moorpark				55°45′34″N 4°41′36″W	Category B	7501	Upload Photo
Kilbirnie 5, 7 Newton Street				55°45′13″N 4°41′08″W	Category C(S)	7525	Upload Photo
Kilbirnie 2 School Wynd				55°45′23″N 4°41′11″W	Category B	7528	Upload Photo
Ladyland House And Gatepiers				55°47′05″N 4°40′39″W	Category A	7532	Upload Photo
Kilbirnie 3, 5 Bridge Street				55°45′21″N 4°41′09″W	Category C(S)	7493	Upload Photo
Kilbirnie Castle Or Place				55°45′02″N 4°42′16″W	Category B	7530	Upload Photo
Fernbank				55°45′16″N 4°41′59″W	Category B	7490	Upload Photo
Kilbirnie 37, 39 Main Street Strathclyde Regional Offices				55°45′18″N 4°41′07″W	Category B	7497	Upload Photo
Ladyland House Sundial				55°47′06″N 4°40′38″W	Category A	7499	Upload another image See more images
Kilbirnie 89, 91 Main Street				55°45′15″N 4°41′08″W	Category C(S)	7519	Upload Photo
Kilbirnie 54, 56, 58 Main Street				55°45′17″N 4°41′09″W	Category C(S)	7521	Upload Photo
Kilbirnie 21, 23 Main Street Knox Institute				55°45′19″N 4°41′07″W	Category B	7496	Upload Photo
Ladyland Stables				55°47′06″N 4°40′33″W	Category B	7500	Upload Photo
Kilbirnie 1, 3 Newton Street				55°45′13″N 4°41′08″W	Category C(S)	7524	Upload Photo
Kilbirnie School Road, Beechgrove				55°45′19″N 4°41′23″W	Category B	7527	Upload Photo

== Key ==
The scheme for classifying buildings in Scotland is:

- Category A: "buildings of national or international importance, either architectural or historic; or fine, little-altered examples of some particular period, style or building type."
- Category B: "buildings of regional or more than local importance; or major examples of some particular period, style or building type, which may have been altered."
- Category C: "buildings of local importance; lesser examples of any period, style, or building type, as originally constructed or moderately altered; and simple traditional buildings which group well with other listed buildings."

In March 2016 there were 47,288 listed buildings in Scotland. Of these, 8% were Category A, and 50% were Category B, with the remaining 42% being Category C.

== See also ==
- List of listed buildings in North Ayrshire
