= Geoffrey Pyke =

English inventor, journalist, and educator (1893–1948)

- Born: Geoffrey Nathaniel Joseph Pyke; 9 November 1893; Kensington, London, United Kingdom
- Died: 21 February 1948 (aged 54); Hampstead, London, United Kingdom
- Occupations: Journalist, educationalist and inventor
- Spouse: Margaret Amy Chubb
- Scientific career
- Known for: Pykrete, Project Habakkuk
- Fields: Military technology

Signature
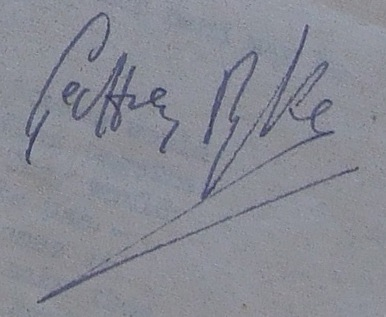

Geoffrey Pyke (9 November 1893 – 21 February 1948) was an English journalist, educationalist, and inventor.

Pyke came to public attention when he escaped from internment in Germany during World War I. He had travelled to Germany under a false passport, and was soon arrested and interned.

During the Second World War, Pyke proposed the newly invented material, pykrete, for the construction of the ship Habakkuk.

== Early life ==
Geoffrey Nathaniel Joseph Pyke was born on 9 November 1893 in Kensington to Lionel Edward Pyke QC, a barrister, and Mary Rachel Pyke (née Lucas). Pyke was the cousin of Magnus Pyke.

From 1907 to 1909, Pyke was educated at Wellington College. At his mother's insistence, Pyke maintained the dress and habits of an Orthodox Jew. He became an atheist when he was thirteen. The persecution he suffered instilled in him a hatred of and contempt for "The Establishment". After two years at Wellington, he was withdrawn, tutored privately and then admitted to Pembroke College, Cambridge, to study law.

== First World War ==
At the outbreak of the First World War, Pyke quit his studies to become a war correspondent. He persuaded the editor of the Daily Chronicle to send him to Berlin. He used the passport obtained from an American sailor by travelling via Denmark. In Germany, he conversed with local Germans, and eavesdropped on other people's conversations, witnessing the mobilisation of Germans for war with the Russian Empire.

In early October, 1914, after six days in Germany, Pyke was arrested in his bed-sitting room, and was taken away leaving a letter written in English on his desk. Confined to a small cell in solitary confinement, he believed that he might not be executed after all; remarking that "the German government was not going to waste 4d on my keep if it was going to be faced with burial expenses on the fifth day". During captivity, he reflected on hunger:

Hunger – real hunger – not your going without afternoon tea, or no-eggs-at-breakfast sort of affair – can, when a man is utterly without occupation, make life one continual aching weary desire. If the desire is not satisfied, or does not abate of its own accord (as it very often does), it can have disastrous effects on a man's mind. It has been known to make men think very seriously about the rights of property, and a few have become so unbalanced as to become socialists.

During confinement, Pyke longed for books, writing material and socialising. When allowed out for exercise, he moved around the yard and exchanged words with other inmates. He pieced together poems from memory – If by Rudyard Kipling and Jabberwocky by Lewis Carroll – and recited them loudly in the darkness. During this time, Pyke questioned his sanity.

In January 1915, he was transferred to another prison where he was able to mix with other prisoners and buy newspapers, learning that thousands of foreigners had passed through this prison for a period of quarantine before being transferred to the internment camp at Ruhleben. Five days later, he was transferred to a third prison in Moabit, and then to the internment camp at Ruhleben. (Note: Lampe gives very few details of Pyke's time in prison, although he mentions a period of 112 days of solitary confinement – 16 weeks. This is longer than Pyke's 13 weeks to which might be added a further 10 days at other prisons.)

At Ruhleben, Pyke met fellow graduates from Oxford and Cambridge. They supplied him with extra clothes, food, books and other amenities. Pyke soon became ill and he nearly died of double pneumonia and food poisoning, but recovered in summer. Despite illness, he thought about the possibility of escape and repeatedly questioned fellow inmates. Most were pessimistic about escape, but an Englishman, Edward Falk, agreed despite the low success rate of other attempts. Pyke compiled statistical data on previous escapes, and together with Falk, made a decision to escape, following a regime of calisthenic exercise to prepare. On the afternoon of 9 July 1915, Pyke and Falk crept into a hut and hid under tennis nets, using glare from the sunset to blind the patrolling guard. Successful, they waited until dark and climbed over the perimeter fences. (Note: These details only appear in the 2002 reprint, Pyke did not reveal his escape method in the original work published during the war.)

Pyke and Falk took a tram into Berlin, buying clothes and camping equipment and then traveled west. Within 80 miles (130 km) of the Dutch border, they decided to walk, traversing barbed wire fences and quagmire. Approaching the border, they consumed what remained of their food and discarded their equipment apart from some rope made from string, deciding to cross the Dutch frontier. As they rested, they were discovered by a soldier and tried to talk their way out of the encounter, only to discover the soldier was Dutch and they were already 50 yards (46 m) inside the Netherlands. From here, made their way to England. Pyke visited his news editor to confess that his mission had failed. However, the editor told Pyke that the story of his escape, based on a long telegraph report Pyke had sent from Amsterdam, had become one of the biggest Fleet Street scoops of the war. Pyke was the first Englishman to get into Germany and out again, and he was encouraged to write a series of articles for the Chronicle. Pyke refused, citing lost interest in being a war correspondent. He divided his time between lecturing on his experiences and writing for the Cambridge Magazine, edited by Charles Kay Ogden.

Pyke arranged for some food parcels to be sent to friends in Ruhleben; the boxes contained details of his method of escape concealed in false bottoms. Although his parcels arrived, no prisoner attempted to repeat his methods. As an escaped prisoner of war, he was exempt from conscription and his views had begun to drift towards pacifism. He wrote a memoir of his experiences, To Ruhleben – And Back, and published in 1916. Because the war was still on at that time, Pyke omitted some details of his escape from his account. To Ruhleben – And Back was republished in 2002. In March 1918, Pyke met Margaret Amy Chubb, they were married within three months of meeting. (Note: Margaret was the daughter of a Hampshire doctor, studied history at Oxford University and would later serve as chairman of the Family Planning Association and receive an OBE. She died on 19 June 1966.)

== Between the wars ==
=== Money-making schemes ===
Between the First and Second World Wars, Pyke attempted a number of money-making schemes, speculating on the commodity market, using his own system of financial management and working through a number of different stockbrokers to avoid attention and higher stock broking charges.

=== Malting House School ===
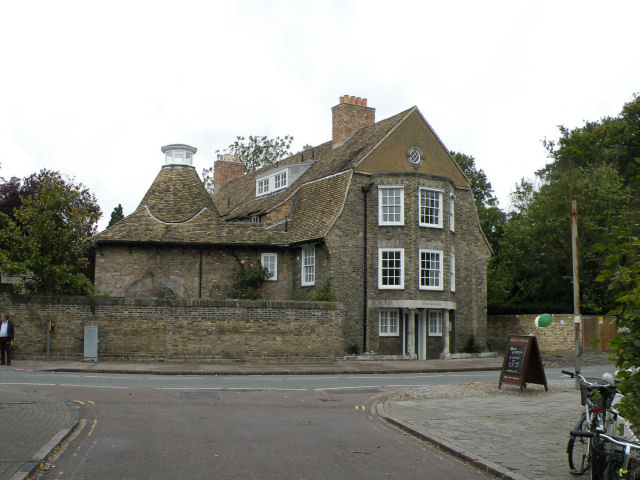
The Malting House school building photographed in 2008. The building is on the corner of Newnham Road and Malting Lane and overlooks the Mill Pond and Sheep's Green.

The Pykes had a son, David Pyke (1921–2001), and Pyke became preoccupied by the question of his son's education. In October 1924, to create an education that differed from his own and promoted curiosity whilst equipping young people to live in the twentieth century, he set up an infants' school in his Cambridge home. His wife, Margaret, was a strong supporter of the school and its ideas. Pyke recruited a psychologist, Susan Sutherland Isaacs, to run the school, and although Pyke had many original ideas regarding education, he promised her that he would not interfere.

Pyke continued with his city speculations which funded the Malting House School.

The greater his gains, the more he invested until he began to see himself and the people who ran the Great Ormond Street office as a gang of economic corsairs, youthful Bloomsbury intellectual buccaneers slashing through the City and coming away with all its money, and with it endowing a worthwhile work. Certainly, no individual in the strange company ever made any noticeable personal profit, and Pyke's high salary was always paid immediately into the Malting House account.

— Lampe

The Malting House School was based on the theories of the American philosopher and educationist John Dewey. It fostered the individual development of children; children were given great freedom and were supported rather than punished. The teachers were seen as observers of the children, who were seen as research workers. For a short time, The Maltings was a critical if not a commercial success; it was visited by many educationists and it was the subject of a film documentary. Pyke had ambitious plans for the school and began to interfere with the day-to-day running, whereupon Susan Isaacs left The Maltings.

In 1927, Pyke lost all his money and became bankrupt. The Malting House School was forced to close, Margaret Pyke had to take a job as a headmistress's secretary; she left Geoffrey although they were never divorced. Already suffering from periodic fits of depression and burdened with huge debts to his brokers, he withdrew from normal life altogether and survived on donations from close friends.

=== Work against antisemitism ===
In 1934, Pyke opposed the wave of antisemitism in Nazi Germany, citing humanitarian reasons. Pyke campaigned for Christian leaders to make simultaneous public statements condemning the Nazis, raising money to set up an organisation to combat anti-Semitism. He wrote a number of magazine articles on the irrationality of prejudice and started work on a book. In his published letters and articles, Pyke insisted that it was necessary to collect data and this struck a chord with other thinkers who would – giving full credit for the germ of an idea to Pyke – go on to establish the Mass Observation project that set out to document the lives of ordinary Britons.

=== Voluntary Industrial Aid for Spain ===
During the Spanish Civil War, Pyke founded the Voluntary Industrial Aid for Spain (VIAS) organisation, encouraging individuals with little money to contribute their time and skills instead. This was opposed by trade unionists who believed that unpaid work might set a dangerous precedent, but Pyke persisted. By October 1938, twenty-five vehicles had been sent to Spain including two mobile blood transfusion units, and by the end of the war, more than seventy vehicles had been contributed. Organised by Trade Unions, workers were, with the assistance of sympathetic employers who lent the use of machines and premises, able to produce useful items of equipment. Pyke also invented a motorcycle sidecar to carry medical supplies or a patient. He raised funds to pay for American-built Harley-Davidson motorcycles that were then plentifully available second-hand, and persuaded workers to make the sidecars free of charge with the results being sent out to Spain.

Pyke also assisted in arranging for the manufacture of mattresses for the Spanish government, for the collection of redundant horse-drawn ploughs for Spanish farmers, and bundles of hand-tools for use by labourers. He published aggressive propaganda brochures pointing out that British workers were not to consider their contributions a form of charity while Spanish people were fighting and dying for their fellow workers. To answer a shortage of bandages and dressings in Spain, he suggested that sun-dried peat moss sewn into muslin bags could be used as a substitute for cotton dressings. Soon, moss collected by volunteers in Britain was on its way to Spain.

== Second World War ==
=== Spying on Nazi Germany ===
In 1939, before the outbreak of the Second World War, Pyke considered the problem of finding out what the German people actually thought of the Nazi regime. His idea was to perform an opinion poll in secret by sending volunteers to Germany to interview ordinary people. He would train the volunteers personally. The plan was that the interviewers should pose as golfers on a tour of Germany and that interviews should be informal, with the questions being inserted into everyday conversation; the first German city to be targeted would be Frankfurt. Pyke travelled to Frankfurt where he met Peter Raleigh. Raleigh suggested that there were enough of Pyke's golfers in Germany to challenge the Frankfurt golf club to a match. Pyke concluded that this would be an excellent idea, and put this new plan into action.

By 21 August, Pyke had ten interviewers working in Germany. On 25 August, following hints from contacts at the Foreign Office, Pyke recalled all his agents and they arrived back in England over the following few days. Pyke's original idea had been to present Hitler with an account of the true feelings of the German people, but this did not materialise with the outbreak of war. Raleigh and Patrick Smith did make a broadcast on the newly formed BBC World Service in which they contrasted the mood in Germany with that in London, and Pyke prepared a report for the War Office.

Pyke tried to generate interest in his opinion poll results and in repeating the exercise in Germany using people from neutral countries. He got little support, but did attract the attention of Conservative Member of Parliament Leo Amery. Amery did think that Pyke's idea was worthwhile and privately convinced others including Clement Attlee and Sir Stafford Cripps. Pyke's friends concluded that nothing would come of the scheme and persuaded Pyke to let the matter drop.

=== Military inventions ===
Pyke then wrote on grand strategy and worked on a number of ideas for practical inventions. Inspired by the sight of barrage balloons, he conceived the idea of using them to mount microphones allowing the location of aircraft to be ascertained by triangulation. Pyke was unaware that the development of radar provided a much better means of achieving this effect.

==== Operation Plough / First Special Service Force ====
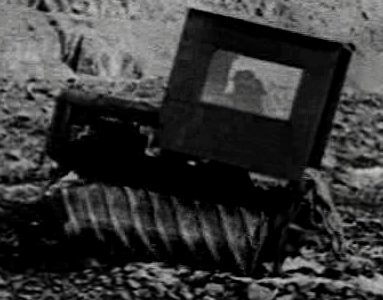
A screw-propelled prototype of the Weasel (probably an Armstead snow motor fitted on a Fordson tractor together with a lightweight driver's cabin)

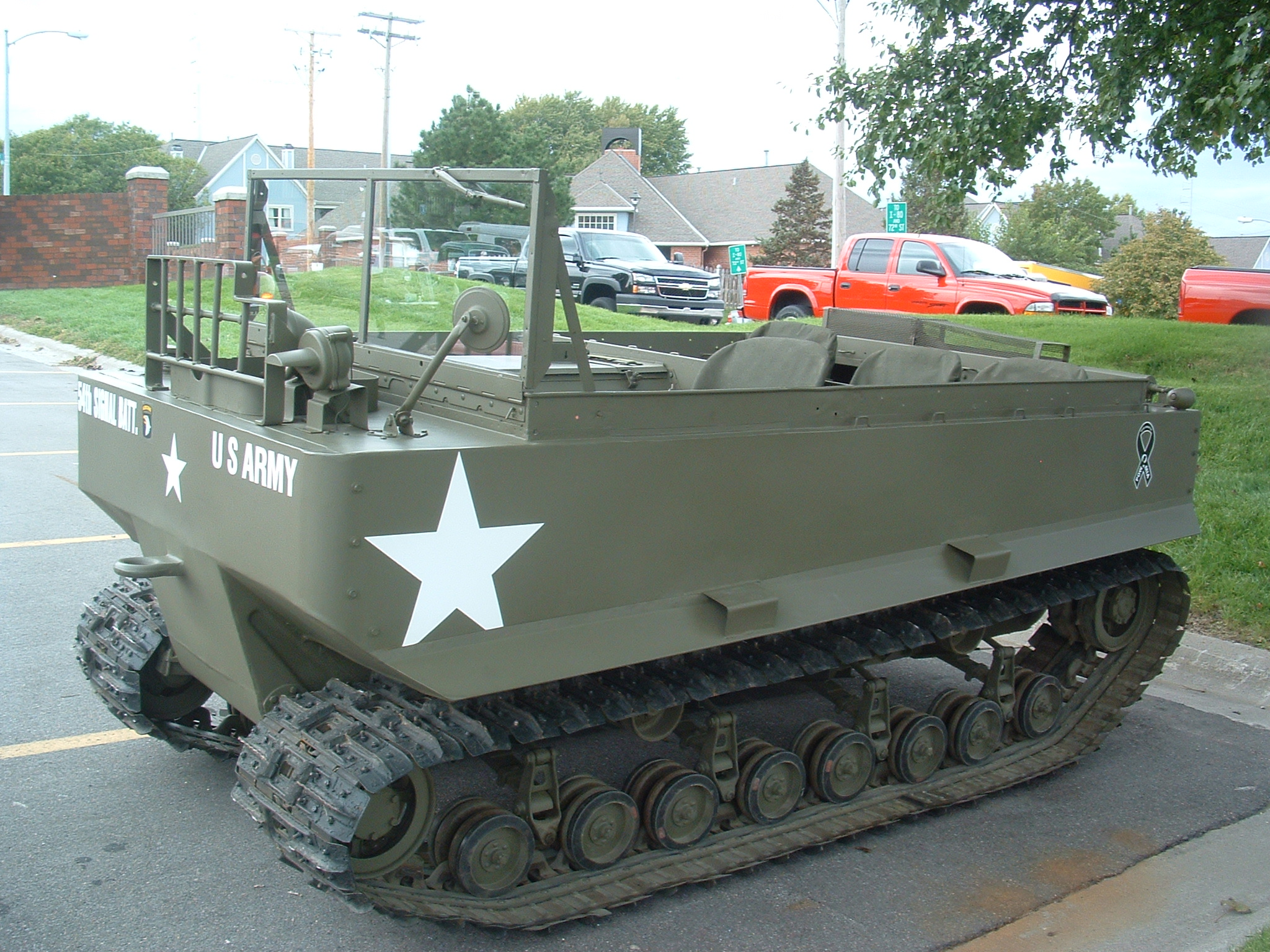
The M29 Weasel eventually produced

With the invasion of Norway, Pyke considered the problem of transporting soldiers rapidly over snow. He proposed the development of a screw-propelled vehicle based on an old patent called the Armstead snow motor. This consisted of a pair of lightweight cylinders, shaped like very large artillery shells, to support the weight of the vehicle. These cylinders have a spiral flange that digs into the snow; when the cylinders turn (in opposite directions), the vehicle is propelled forwards. Pyke envisaged that a small force of highly mobile soldiers could occupy the attentions of many enemy soldiers who would be required to guard against possible points of attack.

Initially, Pyke's idea was rejected. Then, in October 1941, Louis Mountbatten replaced Roger Keyes as Chief of Combined Operations. This changed the character of the department and Mountbatten allowed unusual talents and ideas. Conservative Member of Parliament Leo Amery wrote to Mountbatten recommending that Pyke's Norway scheme, originally rejected by Keyes, be re-examined and that Mountbatten should take Pyke onto his staff. Mountbatten valued Pyke's ideas, and for liberalising other staff, eventually adopted the plan. The scheme became Operation Plough of the First Special Service Force. When presented to Prime Minister Winston Churchill, he noted in the minutes of the meeting:

Never in the history of human conflict will so few immobilize so many.

Pyke's snow vehicle project was superseded by Canadian development of the Weasel tracked personnel carrier, produced first for the American-Canadian commando unit the First Special Service Force, which trained first for Norway but was actually deployed in Italy. The US built hundreds of these as the M29 vehicle.

==== Project Habakkuk ====
In April 1942, Pyke was presented with the problem of how to prevent the icing of ships in Arctic waters. He took the problem to Max Perutz at the Cavendish Laboratory, Cambridge; Pyke knew that Perutz had previously worked on the physical properties of snow with regard to the difficulties of Operation Plough. Perutz proposed a solution and in a footnote his memorandum noted that:

It is not only this country but the whole world which, as compared with knowledge of other natural phenomena, lacks knowledge of snow and ice. This is fortunate, for whoever gets there first may get a great advantage.

— Perutz quoted by Lampe

In September 1942, Pyke sent a 232-page memorandum to Mountbatten detailing his ideas. It suggested a number of uses for ice and for super cooled water (water that has been cooled below its freezing point while remaining liquid) and the suggestion of the construction of gigantic aircraft carriers from ice that was either frozen naturally or artificially. Whereas conventional aircraft carriers were restricted to relatively small, specialised aircraft, these could launch and land conventional fighters and bombers. As such, they could provide air cover for convoys in mid-Atlantic, staging posts for long flights over seas or as launch pads for amphibious assaults on France or Japan. A biography of Pyke by David Lampe indicates that he had decided to use ice reinforced with wood fibres, but other accounts make it clear that this is not the case. Pyke was not the first to suggest a floating mid-ocean stopping point for aircraft, nor the first to suggest that such a floating island could be made of ice, German scientist Dr. A. Gerke of Waldenburg in Germany proposed the idea and carried out some preliminary experiments in Lake Zurich in 1930.

Pyke's memorandum included a couple of cover notes. The first requested that Mountbatten should read the suggestions himself before allowing it to fall into the hands of "that damned fool Lushington". The second, longer, note asked that Mountbatten read the first thirty pages of the memorandum before deciding whether it was worthwhile to continue "It may be gold: it may only glitter. I can't tell. I have been hammering at it too long and am blinded". Mountbatten handed it to Brigadier Wildman-Lushington, and Lushington with the assistance of J. D. Bernal, concluded that Pyke's main proposals were feasible. In December 1942, Prime Minister Churchill issued a directive that research on the project should be pressed forward with the highest priority and he expressed the opinion that nature be allowed to do as much of the work as possible.

The project to build a large aircraft carrier of pykrete was known as Project Habakkuk, and Pyke was sent to Canada with a personal introduction from Winston Churchill to Mackenzie King. While he was away, an Admiralty committee headed by the Chief of Naval Construction sent a memorandum about Habakkuk to Mountbatten. Pyke returned from Canada. Pyke's original memorandum mentioned other applications for pykrete such as building landing ships for the prospective invasion of Japan and for quickly constructing fortifications at a beachhead by spraying an existing building with pykrete liquid that would freeze into a thick layer. Many of these ideas relied upon a misplaced faith in the qualities of supercooled water which he thought could be used as a weapon of war: pumped from a ship it could be used to instantly form bulwarks of ice or even be sprayed directly onto enemy soldiers. However, such ideas were according to Max Perutz, impractical.

In September 1943, Pyke proposed a slightly less ambitious plan for pykrete vessels to be used in support of an amphibious assault. He proposed a pykrete monitor 200 feet (61 m) long and 50 feet (15 m) wide mounting a single naval gun turret; this could be self-powered or towed to where it would be used. He also suggested the use of pykrete to make breakwaters and landing stages. At the time, Max Perutz thought the ideas were practical and that the preceding research on pykrete was sufficiently advanced to allow Pyke's plan to be executed. The plan was not put into action, but for the allied invasion of Normandy a system of preconstructed concrete breakwaters and landing stages called Mulberry was employed. Pyke's plans hint that he had some knowledge of the Mulberry plans, perhaps through his contacts with Bernal, who was one of Mulberry's progenitors.

==== Men in pipes ====
In late 1943, Pyke submitted to Mountbatten a memorandum, nearly fifty pages long, explaining his ideas for a solution to the problem of unloading stores from ships where no proper port facilities are available and few roads inland. This circumstance was common in the Pacific War theatre and fundamental to the 1943 decision to invade France by landing on the beaches of Normandy, with no harbours and a 24-foot tide. Pyke's idea was to use pipes of the type that were used to transport fuel from ship to shore, to move sealed containers that would contain any type of sufficiently small material objects. Pyke suggested that 4 or 6 inches (100 or 150 mm) pipes would handle smaller equipment and larger objects could be passed through two-foot pipes. Furthermore, there was no reason why the pipes should stop at the shore, they could be extended inland as required. Bernal gave a cautious endorsement to the idea, adding that it would require a great deal of investigation. Pyke's idea was similar to the cleaning brushes that are sometimes forced along pipes by the pressure of the fluid and to the pipeline pigs which today are used for cleaning and telemetry.

Pyke then proposed that his idea for "Power-Driven Rivers" could be extended to the transport of personnel. The pipes would need to be at least two feet in diameter and the pressures would have to be high. He worked out ideas for supplying the passengers with oxygen and suggested that the problem of claustrophobia might be alleviated by travelling in pairs and by the use of barbiturate drugs.

The whole experience (of riding in a pipe) however should be far less unpleasant, and take very much less time to become used to, than parachute jumping, or being bombed.

— Pyke quoted by Lampe

Pyke proposed that this system could be used to move people from ship to shore, from island to island, through swamps and over mountains and anywhere where conventional transport was difficult. The idea was never used.

== After World War II ==
After World War II, Pyke's inventions continued. One suggestion for the problems of energy-starved post-war Europe was to propel railway wagons by human muscle power – employing 20 to 30 men on bicycle-like mechanisms to pedal a cyclo-tractor. Pyke reasoned that the energy in a pound of sugar cost about the same as an equivalent energy in the form of coal and that while Europe had plenty of sugar and unemployed people, there was a shortage of coal and oil. He recognised that such a use of human muscle power was in some ways distasteful, but could not see that the logic of arguments about calories and coal were unlikely to be sufficiently persuasive.

Pyke was given a commission to look into the problems of the National Health Service and, characteristically, made his contribution as a part of a minority report. He remained eager to convey his unconventional ideas, and continued to both write and broadcast them. He campaigned against the death penalty, and for government support of UNICEF.

== Death and legacy ==
On the evening of Saturday 21 February 1948 in Steele's Road, Hampstead, Pyke shaved his beard and consumed a bottleful of sleeping pills. His landlady found his body the following Monday morning. The coroner gave a verdict of suicide at a moment of mental unbalance. Before consuming the pills, he had written private letters that made it clear that his death was premeditated. An obituary in The Times praised him and lamented his passing, beginning with the words:

The death of Geoffrey Pyke removes one of the most original if unrecognised figures of the present century.

John Bernal, who knew Pyke well, wrote:

He remained always the knight-errant, from time to time gathering round him a small band of followers but never a leader of big movements. Because of the very greatness of his ideas most of his life was one of frustration and disappointment, but he has left behind to all who knew him and were indirectly affected by him the vision he created for making all things possible.

== See also ==
- Magnus Pyke, his first cousin

== Bibliography ==
- Battersby, Stephen (22 December 2012). "Shiver me timbers: The coolest warship ever made". New Scientist. 216 (2896): 63–65. Bibcode:2012NewSc.216...63B. doi:10.1016/S0262-4079(12)63270-9.
- Brown, Andrew (2005), JD Bernal: The Sage of Science, Oxford University Press, ISBN 0-19-851544-8
- Cameron, Laura (2006). "Science, nature, and hatred: 'finding out' at the Malting House Garden School, 1924–29" (PDF). Environment and Planning D: Society and Space. 24 (6): 851–72. Bibcode:2006EnPlD..24..851C. doi:10.1068/d374t. S2CID 144096364.
- Hemming, Henry (2014), Churchill's Iceman: The True Story of Geoffrey Pyke: Genius, Fugitive, Spy, Preface Publishing, ISBN 9781848094437
- Lampe, David (1959), Pyke, the Unknown Genius, London: Evans Brothers
- Lawrence, Evelyn (1949). "The Malting House School" (PDF). National Froebel Foundation Bulletin. University of Roehampton, London.
- Pawle, Gerald (1978), Secret Weapons of World War II, New York: Ballantine Books, ISBN 0-345-27895-X
- Perutz, Max (1948). "A Description of the Iceberg Aircraft Carrier and the Bearing of the Mechanical Properties of Frozen Wood Pulp upon Some Problems of Glacier Flow". The Journal of Glaciology. I (3): 95–104. Bibcode:1948JGlac...1...95P. doi:10.1017/S0022143000007796.
- Perutz, Max (2002), I Wish I'd Made You Angry Earlier, Oxford University Press, ISBN 0-19-859027-X
- Pyke, Geoffrey (2002), To Ruhleben – and Back, Collins Library, McSweeney's, ISBN 0-9719047-8-2
- "Everybody's Conscience". Time. 8 March 1948. Archived from the original on 5 May 2009.
- "Trabajadores: The Spanish Civil War through the eyes of organised labour". Archives of the Trades Union Congress. Warwick Digital Library.
