= Jennifer Elder =

American writer (born 1968)

Jennifer Elder (born 1968, San Francisco) is an American author and assistant editor for the Collins Library of McSweeney's publishing house.

== Early life and education ==
She graduated from the San Francisco Art Institute in 1990.

== Career ==
As the mother of an autistic son, she has written two books for autistic children: Different Like Me and Autistic Planet. Aukids Magazine called Autistic Planet a "delightful children's storybook" and 'Good Autism Practice' found it "engaging and entertaining". However, a review of Different Like Me in Community Care magazine criticised its "sentimental depiction of autism". She is married to author Paul Collins, and together they have has appeared on the American Public Media program On Being.

Parenting magazine noted about her book Different Like Me: My Book of Autism Heroes, "Autistic kids 8 and older will enjoy discovering that people like Albert Einstein and Lewis Carroll were also autistic! Each person is given a short bio that includes some of the difficulties they faced. It can provide a self-esteem boost for ASD children."

== Selected works ==
- Different Like Me, Jessica Kingsley Publishers, 2005, ISBN 978-1-84310-815-3
- Autistic Planet, Jessica Kingsley Publishers, 2007, ISBN 978-1-84310-842-9
