= New Education Movement =

20th-century European progressive education movement

The New Education movement, also known as the New School, éducation nouvelle in French, and Reformpädagogik in German, was an early 20th-century progressive movement within education, a European counterpart to the progressive education movement.

== Origins ==
The New Education movement originated in post-First World War society, as a new social order was being constructed. In 1921, the New Education Fellowship was founded, born out of Theosophy and founding the New Education movement. The movement included several schools, including the Malting House School, which focused mostly on improving pupils' educational experiences, such as by granting children more educational freedom. The Fellowship published New Era, which it published until at least the 1970s, and brought other schools into experimental education. Adherents of the New Education Movement included Maria Montessori, John Dewey, and Jean Piaget.

== Theory ==
The New Education Movement preached a theory (here simplified) of acknowledging children's personalities and building a better society. The teacher's role was not to impose strict regimes on the child, but to nurture the child and help them develop their abilities. It was hoped by members of the New Education movement that a scientific basis could be created on educational problems, as a result of the movement building up more interest in experimental psychology. The "scientific educationists", among them educationists such as G. Stanley Hall, believed that study on the "higher faculties" of children would lead to better education. The movement was influenced greatly by Theosophy and Jean-Jacques Rousseau.
