= Hemacite =

Material formerly used in manufacturing

Hemacite is a material made from sawdust and the blood of cattle and pigs. It was invented and patented by Dr W H Dibble of New Jersey in the last quarter of the nineteenth century. Using hydraulic pressure (280 MPa or 40,000 psi) and chemical compounds, blood and sawdust were transformed by Dibble's Hemacite Manufacturing Company into everything from doorknobs and roller skate wheels to cash register buttons and telephone receivers; there is even extensive use in Victorian jewellery. Hemacite was inexpensive but fell out of favor with the popularity of new plastics like Bakelite. It is quite easy to misidentify Hemacite as Bakelite.

== Uses ==
This composition was pre-plastic, and ideal for everything from doorknobs to roller skate wheels to products such as buttons, cash register keys and jewelry. The composition of Hemacite was touted as susceptible to a high polish, impervious to heat, moisture, atmospheric changes, it acted very similarity to the material Pykrete. Hemacite was cheap to produce due to blood and sawdust both being cheap materials.

== Decline ==
Although Hemacite is a cheap material, Bakelite was cheaper to produce, and by the early to mid-1900s the popularity of plastics like Bakelite almost entirely replaced the production of Hemacite.
