= To Ruhleben – and Back =

Memoir by Geoffrey Pyke

To Ruhleben – And Back is Geoffrey Pyke's memoir of his experiences in the Ruhleben internment camp. While at Cambridge University, Pyke convinced the editor of the London Daily Chronicle to make him the paper's correspondent in Berlin during World War I. Pyke was captured and sent to Ruhleben with about 4,000 other foreign prisoners. In 1915, after a year in Ruhleben, Pyke escaped into the Netherlands, and from there back to the United Kingdom. Pyke's experiences and memoir brought him minor fame at the time, but were soon forgotten.

In 2002, To Ruhleben – And Back was republished, for the first time since 1916, by McSweeney's Collins Library imprint.
