= Malting House School =

Experimental educational institution in Cambridge, England

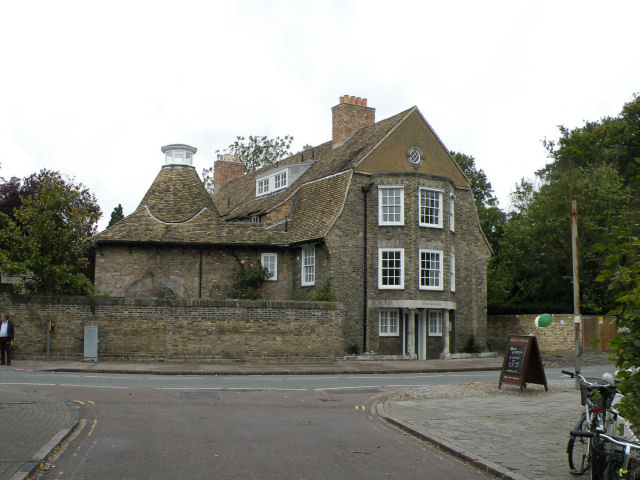
- Malting House School building in 2008

Location
- The Malting House, Malting Lane, Cambridge, CB3 9HF; 52° 11′ 57.5″ N, 0° 06′ 49″ E

Information
- Other name: Malting House Garden School
- Established: 1924
- Founder: Geoffrey Pyke
- Closed: 1929

The Malting House School (also known as the Malting House Garden School) was an experimental educational institution that operated from 1924 to 1929. It was set up by the eccentric and, at the time, wealthy Geoffrey Pyke in his family home in Cambridge and it was run by Susan Sutherland Isaacs. Although it was open for only a few years, the radical ideas explored in this institution have remained influential up until the present day. Since 2004 it has been owned by Darwin College, Cambridge and used as accommodation.

== Premises ==
The Malting House is a building in Cambridge on the corner of Newnham Road and Malting Lane in and overlooks the Mill Pond and Sheep's Green. It was originally a malthouse, Oast house, and a small brewery owned, in the 1830s, by the Beales family, a well-known Cambridge trading dynasty. In 1909, the then Dean of Trinity College (Dr Stewart) bought the buildings and converted most of them into an Arts & Crafts house and two or three years later the remaining buildings were converted into a small hall to host musical evenings. From 1924 to 1929, it was the Malting House School. In later years, the house reverted to a family home. In 2003, the buildings were purchased by Darwin College of Cambridge University to serve as student accommodation, the cost of purchase and conversion being estimated as £1.5M.

Maurice and Sylia Dobb lived in a cottage behind the Malting House – he had a position at Trinity College – Ludwig Wittgenstein was lodging with them at the time, at the invitation of Bertrand Russell.

== Creation ==
Geoffrey Pyke came to public attention when he escaped from internment in Germany during World War I. He had travelled to Germany under a false passport but he was soon arrested and interned. The story of his escape and return to Britain was widely published. In March 1918, Pyke met Margaret Amy Chubb; she was intelligent, pretty, and attracted to Pyke's unconventional good looks and wilful unconventionality. They were married within three months of meeting. After the war, Pyke tried his hand at several money-making schemes. For a while, he made a lot of money speculating on the commodity market using his system of financial management instead of more conventional techniques.

Geoffrey Pyke and Margaret Pyke had a son, David (1921–2001). Geoffrey Pyke became preoccupied with the question of his son's education. He wanted to create an education that promoted curiosity and equipped young people to live in the twentieth century – an education that would be utterly different from his own unhappy experience. To do this he set up an infants' school in his Cambridge home. Founded in October 1924, the school was funded by Pyke's City speculations. His wife, Margaret, was a strong supporter of the school and its ideas.

Pyke placed advertisements in a number of journals, including the New Statesman and Nature:

WANTED—an Educated Young Woman with honours degree—preferably first class—or the equivalent, to conduct education of a small group of children aged 2-1/2–7, as a piece of scientific work and research.

Previous educational experience is not considered a bar, but the advertisers hope to get in touch with a university graduate—or someone of equivalent intellectual standing—who has hitherto considered themselves too good for teaching and who has probably already engaged in another occupation.

A LIBERAL SALARY—liberal as compared with research work or teaching—will be paid to a suitable applicant who will live out, have fixed hours and opportunities for a pleasant independent existence. An assistant will be provided if the work increases.

They wish to obtain the services of someone with certain personal qualifications for the work and a scientific attitude of mind towards it. Hence a training in any of the natural sciences is a distinct advantage.

Preference will be given to those who do not hold any form of religious belief but this is not by itself considered to be a substitute for other qualifications. (Note: Drummond quotes Pyke's advertisement.)

Pyke recruited psychologist Susan Sutherland Isaacs to run the school; although Pyke had many original ideas regarding education, he promised her, that he would not interfere.

Both Pyke and Isaacs had had unconventional and unhappy experiences of growing up. Pyke's father, Edward Lionel Pyke, was a Jewish lawyer who died when he was only five years old, leaving his family with no money. His mother quarrelled with relatives and made life "hell" for her children. She sent Geoffrey to Wellington, a snobbish private school mainly catering to the children of Army officers; here, she insisted that Pyke maintain the dress and habits of an Orthodox Jew. While there, he was a victim of persecution that instilled him with a hatred of and contempt for The Establishment. After two years at Wellington he was withdrawn, tutored privately and then admitted to Pembroke College, Cambridge to study law.

Isaacs' mother died when she was six years old. Shortly afterwards she became alienated from her father after he married the nurse who had attended her mother during her illness. At the age of fifteen, Isaacs was removed from school by her father because she had converted to atheistic socialism; her father refused to speak to her for 2 years. She stayed at home with her stepmother until she was 22.

Besides Geoffrey Pyke and his wife, the other leading figures in the school were Susan Isaacs and her second husband, Nathan Isaacs; and Evelyn Lawrence who arrived two years into the experiment.

In April 1927, the school advertised again:

WANTED—A SCIENTIST of the first order, if necessary of senior standing, but as young as possible, with a knowledge of the theory of science, to investigate and conduct the introduction of young children, 4½–10, to science and scientific method.

This advertisement indicated that Ernest Rutherford, Percy Nunn and J.B.S. Haldane had agreed to assist the directors of the school in the final selection of candidates.

== Operation ==
In an advertisement for residential pupils, in July 1927, some of the operating principles of the school were explained.

The method employed at Cambridge with children ranging from 3 to 7 to forward this result is on the one hand to eliminate the arbitrary authority of the pedagogue and to substitute for it the attitude of the co-investigator ("Let's find out" and not on any verbal information is the answer given to most questions), and on the other hand to provide an environment with more than usual scope for activity, intellectual and social, including apparatus which shall both set problems and provide their solution. For instance: a lathe, simulative poser of many arithmetical and geometrical questions — apparatus showing the expansion of materials under heat where nothing visible may happen except with patience — a garden with plants (which may without taboo be dug up every day to see how they are getting on, leading mainly to the discovery that that is a temptation best resisted if growth is desired) — animals which breed — weighing machines graded from a see-saw with weights, through kitchen scales, to a laboratory balance — typewriters to bridge the gap between writing and reading — double-handed saws which compel co-operation — and clay for modelling, where phantasy pays toll to skill and effort.

It seems very likely that the form of education was influenced by the ideas of John Dewey and Maria Montessori. In the 1920s and 1930s, John Dewey became famous for pointing out that the authoritarian, strict, pre-ordained knowledge approach of traditional education was too concerned with delivering knowledge, and not enough with understanding students' actual experiences. Montessori's ideas gave rise to the Montessori education which the idea of children choosing the means of educating themselves. The Malting House School fostered the individual development of children; children were given great freedom and were supported rather than punished. The teachers were seen as observers of the children who were seen as research workers.

...Dan (5; 1) was looking at a picture of a steamship, and Mrs. I. made some remark about "the windows". Dan corrected her, emphatically, "They're not windows, they're portholes". Mrs. I. said, "Yes, they're portholes, but then portholes are windows". (He had not at that date seen any actual steamships, only pictures of them.) Dan rejected this "egocentrically", and with vehement scorn. But when Mrs. I. suggested that he should ask Christopher, who, as Dan knew had come over from America on a steamship, he did so, and meekly accepted Christopher's corroboration of Mrs. I.'s statement.

The children had a bonfire of rubbish in the garden, and they remarked on the volume of smoke coming from it, and called themselves "brave" when they ran through it. Dan (5; 2) [five years and two months] said "It makes me choke when it goes down inside". He asked, "Is there any soot in the smoke?" Mrs I[saacs] replied "Let's hold something in it and see". They held a white plate in the smoke; a thin brown film was deposited, and the children said, "Yes, there is soot in it". Mrs I. then took a candle, lit it, and held the plate in the smoke from it. The children said, on seeing the much heavier deposit of soot, "There's much more soot in that". Dan said, "You've burnt the plate". Mrs I. washed the plate, and he saw that the soot came off and that the plate itself was not burnt.

The school attracted the attention of a wide range of intellectuals. The children came from parents with an academic or professional background who had, in many cases, already achieved eminence in their fields. They included two sons of G. E. Moore (Cambridge philosopher and ethicist), the daughter of Edgar Adrian, 1st Baron Adrian (neurophysiologist, nobel laureate), Philip Sargant Florence (post-graduate student and later Professor of Economics). Yvonne Kapp, who described Pyke as "an intimate if entirely unpredictable friend" took her children to the school every day.

== Closure ==
The Pykes, the Isaacs and those around them were dedicated to the teachings of Sigmund Freud. The ethos of the school was that children should, as far as possible, not have harmful inhibitions pressed upon them. This philosophy extended to permitting the children to express a full range of feelings including aggression and curiosity about bodily functions. The adults also tried to live their lives without reference to traditional, outmoded, norms of behaviour.

The Pykes took Frank Ramsey into their family, taking him on holiday, asking him to be the godfather of their young son. In 1923, Margaret Pyke found herself to be the object of Ramsey's affection and he made sexual overtures to her. In 1924, Geoffrey became infatuated with Susan Isaacs and before long they began an affair with Margaret blessing and encouraging the relationship – although Nathan was kept in the dark. Margaret eventually turned down Frank Ramsey's advances. A year or so after it had started, Geoffrey and Susan's affair petered out.

As young David reached the age of six, Pyke extended the remit of the school and expanded its ambition. He supported the school lavishly and employed Nathan Isaacs the school's researcher at large on a salary of £500 per year. (Note: equivalent to £26,000 in 2025..)

At the end of 1927, Susan Isaacs left the school. It is not clear exactly why she left, one possibility is that Pyke began to interfere with the day-to-day running of the school but the developing emotional and sexual tangle of relationships between Susan Isaacs, Nathan Isaacs and Evelyn Lawrence may also have been a factor. Evelyn would become Nathan's second wife after Susan's death in 1948.

In 1927, Pyke lost all his money. The Maltings School was forced to close, Margaret Pyke had to take a job as headmistress's secretary; she left Geoffrey although they were never divorced. Already suffering from periodic fits of depression and burdened with huge debts to his brokers, he now withdrew from normal life altogether and existed on donations from his close friends.

== Influence ==
For a short time The Maltings was a critical if not a commercial success; It was visited by many educationalists and the radical ideas explored in this institution have remained influential up until the present day. It was the subject of a film documentary.

Visitors to the school included Jean Piaget and Melanie Klein.

== Bibliography ==
- Brindle, Peter (2004). "Darwin Gets Into 'Property' – In More Ways Than One!". The Darwinian: 2–3.
- Cameron, Laura (2006). "Science, nature, and hatred: 'finding out' at the Malting House Garden School, 1924–29" (PDF). Environment and Planning D: Society and Space. 24 (6): 851–872. doi:10.1068/d374t. S2CID 144096364.
- Drummond, Mary Jane. "Comparisons in Early Years Education: History, Fact, and Fiction". Early Childhood Research and Practice. Archived from the original on 18 May 2008.
- Graham, Philip (2008). A Life Freeing the Minds of Children. Karnac Books. ISBN 978-185575691-5.
- Hemming, Henry (2014), Churchill's Iceman: The True Story of Geoffrey Pyke: Genius, Fugitive, Spy, Preface Publishing, ISBN 978-184809443-7
- Isaacs, Susan (1960) [First published 1930]. Intellectual Growth in Young Children. Appendix by Nathan Isaacs. London: Routledge & Kegan Paul.
- Kapp, Yvonne (2003). Time Will Tell: Memoirs. Verso Books. ISBN 978-185984510-3.
- Lampe, David (1959), Pyke, the Unknown Genius, London: Evans Brothers
- Lawrence, Evelyn (1949). "The Malting House School" (PDF). National Froebel Foundation Bulletin. University of Roehampton, London.
- Perutz, Max (2002). I Wish I Made You Angry Earlier. Oxford University Press. ISBN 0-19-859027-X.
- Pyke, Geoffrey (2002). To Ruhleben – and Back. Collins Library. McSweeny's Books. ISBN 0-9719047-8-2 – via Internet Archive.
- Hai, A.A., May, H., Nawrotzki, K., Prochner, L., Valkanova, Y. (2020). The Malting House School, England. In: Reimagining Teaching in Early 20th Century Experimental Schools. Global Histories of Education. Palgrave Macmillan, Cham. https://doi.org/10.1007/978-3-030-50964-4_5
