= Paul Collins (American writer) =

American writer

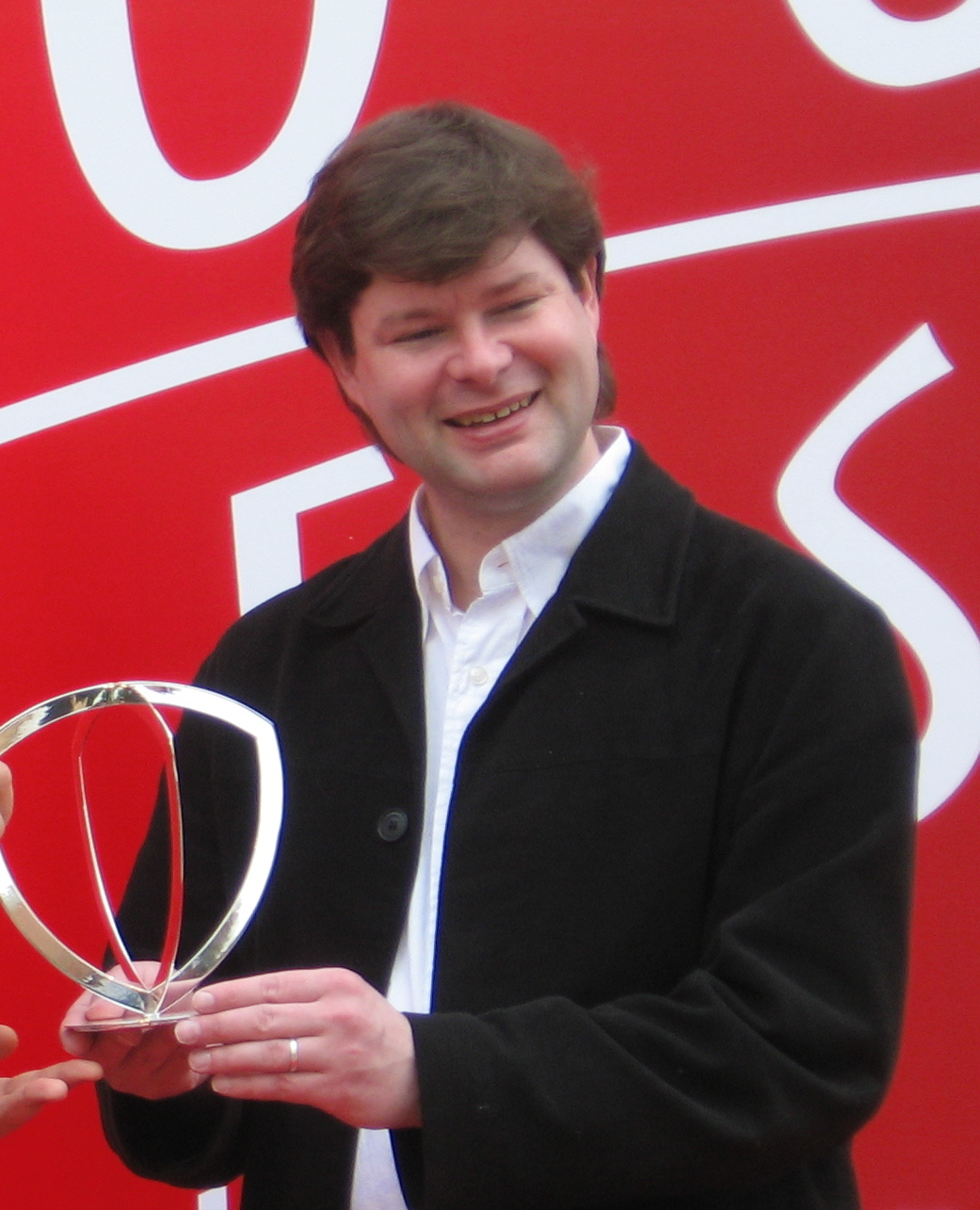
- Collins in 2008
- Born: January 12, 1969 (age 57); Perkiomenville, Pennsylvania, U.S.
- Education: University of California, Davis (B.A.); College of William and Mary (M.A.); CUNY Graduate Center (Ph.D.)
- Occupations: Writer, editor, educator
- Spouse: Jennifer Elder

Paul Collins (born January 12, 1969) is an American writer, editor, and professor of English and creative writing at Portland State University, in Portland, Oregon. He is best known for his work with McSweeney's and The Believer, as editor of the Collins Library imprint for McSweeney's Books, and for his appearances on National Public Radio's Weekend Edition Saturday with Scott Simon. His own books deal primarily with quirky forgotten figures from history, sometimes interwoven with memoir. Damian Kulash of the band OK Go has stated that the chapter in Collins' book "Banvard's Folly" about Augustus Pleasonton's patent on blue light led to them naming their third album Of the Blue Colour of the Sky.

== Biography ==
Collins was born in 1969 in Perkiomenville, Pennsylvania. He graduated from the University of California, Davis with his B.A., the College of William and Mary with his M.A., and from the CUNY Graduate Center with his Ph.D.

He is married to the children's author and illustrator Jennifer Elder. He is the parent of an autistic child and is known for his writings on the subject of autism. His book on the subject, Not Even Wrong, was adapted by Oliver Goldstick into the play Wild Boy.

Collins was awarded a Guggenheim Fellowship in 2009.

== Books ==
- Community Writing: Researching Social Issues Through Composition (Erlbaum, 2001), ISBN 0-8058-3834-1
- Banvard's Folly: Thirteen Tales of Renowned Obscurity, Famous Anonymity, and Rotten Luck (Picador USA, 2001), ISBN 0-312-26886-6
- Sixpence House: Lost in a Town of Books (Bloomsbury, 2003), ISBN 1-58234-284-9
- Not Even Wrong: Adventures in Autism (Bloomsbury, 2004), ISBN 1-58234-367-5
- The Trouble with Tom: The Strange Afterlife and Times of Thomas Paine (Bloomsbury, 2005), ISBN 1-58234-502-3
- The Book of William: How Shakespeare's First Folio Conquered the World (Bloomsbury, 2009), ISBN 1-59691-195-6
- The Murder of the Century: The Gilded Age Crime That Scandalized a City and Sparked the Tabloid Wars (Crown, 2011), ISBN 978-0-307-59220-0
- Duel With the Devil: The True Story of How Alexander Hamilton And Aaron Burr Teamed Up to Take On America's First Sensational Murder Mystery (Crown, 2013), ISBN 978-0307956453
- Edgar Allan Poe: The Fever Called Living (New Harvest, 2014), ISBN 978-0544261877
- Blood & Ivy: The 1849 Murder That Scandalized Harvard (W W Norton & Company, 2018), ISBN 978-0393245165
