= Margaret Pyke =

British activist (1893–1966)

Margaret Pyke OBE
- Born: Margaret Amy Chubb; 8 January 1893; Darenth House, Sandgate, Kent, UKGBI
- Died: 19 June 1966 (aged 73); Ardchattan Priory, Ardchattan, Argyll, United Kingdom
- Education: Somerville College, Oxford
- Occupation: Activist
- Organisation(s): British National Birth Control Committee; International Planned Parenthood Federation
- Known for: Co-founder of the British National Birth Control Committee
- Movement: Family planning
- Spouse: Geoffrey Pyke (m. 1918; died 1948)
- Children: 1

Margaret Amy Pyke OBE (née Chubb; 1893–1966) was a British family planning activist and pioneer. A founding member of the British National Birth Control Committee (NBCC), later known as the Family Planning Association (FPA), she succeeded Lady Gertrude Denman as chairman of that organization in 1954.

Pyke was also involved in the founding of the International Planned Parenthood Federation. She was appointed OBE in 1963. The Margaret Pyke Trust was established in 1969 in her memory.

== Early life ==
Margaret Amy Chubb was born 8 January 1893 at Darenth House in Sandgate, Kent to William Lindsay Chubb (1856–1937), a physician, and Isabel Margaret Chubb (née Pringle). Pyke attended Conamur School, a progressive boarding school for girls, as a day student.

In 1912 Margaret Chubb went to Oxford to read modern history at Somerville College, a period which she also enjoyed. She made many friends at Oxford, some of whom remained close to her for the rest of her life. She went down in 1915 with a second-class honours degree and, as war service, joined the Queen Mary's Army Auxiliary Corps (QMAAC). From 1916 to 1917 she worked in the recruiting department of the War Office doing higher grade secretarial work. From 1917 to 1919 she was deputy assistant to the chief controller of the QMAAC and from 1919 to 1920 she was head of the employment department of the London Society for Women's Service.

== Family life ==
In 1918 Chubb married Geoffrey Nathaniel Pyke (1893–1948), the elder son of Lionel Pyke QC. Their only child, David (b. 1921), became a doctor and for 27 years was a consultant physician at King's College Hospital, London, and registrar of the Royal College of Physicians. Geoffrey Pyke had achieved fame in 1915 by escaping from Germany. He had been sent there as correspondent to the Daily Chronicle but had soon been arrested and interned at Ruhleben camp outside Berlin. A few months later he escaped from the camp and made his way on foot to the Dutch frontier. After that he divided his time between lecturing on his experiences and founding, with others, the Cambridge Magazine, a critical review.

In 1923 the Pykes moved to Cambridge, largely to found an infant school, the Malting House School. Geoffrey Pyke had original ideas about the education of very young children, encouraging them to learn, as far as possible, for themselves, adults being there to help and guide them and to answer questions rather than instruct them. These ideas gained influence through the writings of Susan Sutherland Isaacs, whom the Pykes engaged as head of the school staff. Margaret Pyke was a strong supporter of the school and its ideas.

By 1927, Geoffrey Pyke's interference in the day-to-day running of the school, hoping to achieve his grand ambitions for it, led to Susan Isaacs leaving her position. Pyke's subsequent bankruptcy led to the closure of The Malting House School, and Margaret had to take a job as a headmistress's secretary at Hayes Court School. She and her husband separated but never divorced.

== Professional life ==
Margaret Pyke was a family planning pioneer who worked in the family planning movement for 36 years, until her death in 1966. When five birth control societies merged to form the National Birth Control Council (NBCC) in 1930, Margaret Pyke was its first administrator. The NBCC changed its name to the National Birth Control Association in 1931 and then to the Family Planning Association in 1939. Since 1998 it has been known as FPA. In 1930 the purpose of the NBCC was "that married people may space or limit their families and thus mitigate the evils of ill health and poverty".

Margaret Pyke was “tireless in creating and sustaining” the new NBCC clinics which were established across the UK to provide advice on contraception, marriage and all aspects of sex. The branches “were staffed entirely by volunteers (except for the doctors) and worked in borrowed premises”. In 1933 she contracted pulmonary tuberculosis and subsequently lived with Lady Denman at Balcombe, taking over from her, when she died in 1954, as chair of the Family Planning Association. In 1955 Pyke coordinated the visit of the minister of health, Iain Macleod, to the Family Planning Association’s offices and one of its clinics, an event which is acknowledge helping to change the public perception towards contraception, making it more be seen as “respectable”.

Margaret Pyke was also involved in the foundation of the International Planned Parenthood Federation, was appointed OBE in 1963 for her work in the family planning sector, and after her death in 1966, the Margaret Pyke Trust was founded in her memory. In July 1977 Pyke's son, David, was interviewed about his mother by the historian, Brian Harrison, as part of the Suffrage Interviews project, titled Oral evidence on the suffragette and suffragist movements: the Brian Harrison interviews. He talks about his mother's family background, education and her involvement in the birth control movement.

== Death ==
Margaret Pyke died suddenly from a cerebral haemorrhage on 19 June 1966 at Ardchattan Priory, Argyll, while staying with friends in Scotland. Her body was cremated at Glasgow.
