= Nathan Isaacs =

British educational psychologist

- Born: 1895; Nuremberg, German Empire
- Died: 1966 (aged 70–71)
- Scientific career
- Fields: Psychology

Nathan Isaacs (1895–1966) was a British educational psychologist. He worked in the metals trade, but after his marriage to Susan Sutherland Fairhurst, they were partners in her work on early education.

== Early life ==
Isaacs was born in Nuremberg, Germany, (or Frankfurt) in 1895, into a Jewish family of Russian background, who moved shortly to Switzerland. His father was Orthodox, had philosophical interests, and did not work: his mother traded in garments from Eastern Europe. He was the middle child of three, having two sisters. In 1907, when Nathan was aged 12, the family migrated to the United Kingdom.

Isaacs attended school in London for about four years. He then had a job in Bessler, Waechter & Co., a firm in the City of London trading in metals, particularly pig-iron and ferroalloys. In World War I, he was a private soldier in the British Army, serving in the Royal Signals. He met during this time Lionel Robbins, to whom he introduced himself as an agnostic, in the winter of 1916–7. He was in the Battle of Passchendaele in 1917 with the 51st Highland Regiment, was gassed, and was invalided out of the army.

After the war ended, Isaacs again worked for Bessler, Waechter & Co., where he became a manager. He and Lionel Robbins in 1919 attended the psychology course at London University given by Susan Brierley, née Fairhurst. Isaacs married Susan, after her first marriage to William Broadhurst Brierley ended in divorce, in 1922. He rented a flat in Hunter Street, Bloomsbury, and she carried on a psychoanalytic practice there.

== Malting House School ==
Susan Isaacs became principal of Malting House School in 1924. In April of that year, Robbins had dinner with the Isaacs', and found that Nathan was disillusioned with business, looking to retire and move to the country. An advertisement placed by Geoffrey Pyke, who was setting up a progressive school, was drawn to Susan's attention by James Glover, a psychoanalytic colleague who had worked with Pyke. Susan, Nathan and Pyke hammered out an agreement. Pyke and his family moved into the house containing the school, rented from Hugh Fraser Stewart, in Newnham village, a Cambridge suburb. The Isaacs' rented a flat on Hills Road, Cambridge in autumn 1924, but Nathan continued to work in London, where he spent most of the week.

Jean Piaget, the Swiss educator and theorist with whose thought Susan and Nathan Isaacs were closely involved, paid a visit to the Malting House School in 1927. The personal arrangements at the school lasted until that the end of that year. They were undermined by two love triangles. Susan had an affair with Pyke: it was a short fling, around the end of 1925, about which Pyke's wife Margaret knew at the time, but Nathan did not. It was followed by unreasonable behaviour on Pyke's part. Nathan, subsequently, had an affair with Evelyn Lawrence, who joined the staff as psychologist in 1926. Nathan became her lover in August 1927, as Susan knew at the time. The Isaacs' left the school soon after. By that period, Pyke was running out of money and sold his interest in the school to Edgar Obermer (1895–1958), one of the parents; with further funding Pyke kept the school going to 1929, when he had a serious breakdown and it closed.

== Later life ==
Nathan Isaacs continued to work as a metals merchant, and during World War II was a civil servant in the Ministry of Supply. Evelyn Lawrence left Malting House School in 1928. After some time outside London, she started to share a London flat in Primrose Hill with her sister Hilda, close to where Susan and Nathan Isaacs were living: her affair with Nathan was ongoing. In 1943 she became director of the National Froebel Foundation. Susan knew of this relationship, and continued to relate well to Nathan intellectually: she concentrated on writing her book based on observations at Malting House.

After the outbreak of World War II, Isaacs initially continued to work in London; while Susan was based in Cambridge. During The Blitz the Ministry of Supply was moved out of London, and Isaacs was posted to Ashow in the Midlands for most of the rest of the war. Susan travelled there at weekends. Nathan saw little of Evelyn during this time: she had been evacuated at Torquay.

In 1945 Isaacs returned to London, with a job at Derby & Co. He was awarded the OBE for his war work, in 1948. In 1946 Susan began to succumb to recurrent breast cancer, and she died in October 1948. She made clear her wish that Nathan, her carer, and Evelyn should support each other. They were married in April 1950.

While Piaget's early books met with criticisms formulated by Susan and Nathan Isaac, his later methodology was somewhat different. Isaacs and Evelyn Lawrence promoted his work in the United Kingdom, in alliance with the National Froebel Foundation, who in 1955 published a booklet Some Aspect's of Piaget's Work. Isaacs gave evidence to the committee compiling the Plowden Report on education (commissioned 1963, published in 1967 after his death), as an authority on Piaget. The Report adopted a progressive line, reflecting much of Piaget's influence and the earlier work of Susan Isaacs.

== Works and views ==
Over a long period, Isaacs worked on an essay that would be a major statement of his views. It appeared after his wife Susan died, as The Foundations of Common Sense (1949), bearing the subtitle "A Psychological Preface to the Problems of Knowledge". It had a hostile review from J. J. C. Smart, stating that "nowhere does he describe an experiment". Another reviewer wrote "[...] to those who are willing to grant that certainty is achieved and not given, [...] the book will appear [...] a valuable contribution to philosophy."

In the educational field, Isaacs deprecated "empirical psychology". He admired both James Mark Baldwin and John Dewey for their approaches. Under Baldwin's influence, he considered that clarity of speech and thought should early be encouraged in children. Clifford Geertz, writing of a lecture given by the philosopher George Raymond Geiger (1903–1998) on "cultural foundations of common sense", called it a "fine Deweyian subject". But in The Foundations of Common Sense Isaacs expressed the view that those authors had not gone far enough. With Dewey, Isaacs is now cited as one of the founders of progressive education.

Isaacs wrote Children's Why Questions, as a response to, and criticism of, Jean Piaget's The Language and Thought of the Child (1924). The project was financed by Geoffrey Pyke, and resulted also in a 1927 anonymous editorial by Isaacs in Nature, under the title "Education and science", alluding to the curious child. He agreed with A. S. Neill that the assumption of curiosity in the education of children turned out in practice to be dependent on social class. The work was published in the form of an appendix to Susan's Intellectual Growth in Young Children (1930).

"Why" questions are a subclass of wh-questions: Isaacs proposed a sub-classification, as "informational", "epistemic", "justificatory" and "affective and expressional". In discussion of a lecture of Wolfe Mays, Isaacs commented, on young children's understanding of questions, and Piaget's use of them, that the understanding had to be seen as incremental, depending on the acquisition of concepts.

=== Philosopher ===
By the early 1930s, Isaacs had joined the Aristotelian Society: he gave a paper there in 1931 that influenced the Essay on the Nature and Significance of Economic Science (1932) by Lionel Robbins. His interest in philosophy was continuing. But he was unsatisfied with typical philosophical discussion. It has been commented that when Isaacs tried to publish about philosophy proper, he met with continual rejection. His paper What do Linguistic Philosophers Assume? (1960) was published, when Oxford philosophy was topical.

Lydia Smith, biographer of Susan Isaacs, as a Professor of Education writing about the work of Susan and Nathan Isaacs on educational psychology and child development, stated that "Nathan Isaacs was primarily a philosopher; he was interested in the sources of knowledge, and especially in the relationship between language and thought." Isaacs published in 1960 A Brief Introduction to Piaget, in the USA. It contained his works Growth of Understanding in the Young Child, and New Light on Children's Idea of Number. A foreword to the 1972 edition, written by his widow Evelyn Lawrence, states that by this period Isaacs was mostly interested in philosophical topics: epistemology, ethics, logic.
