= Project Habakkuk =

WWII-era British planned aircraft carrier made of pykrete

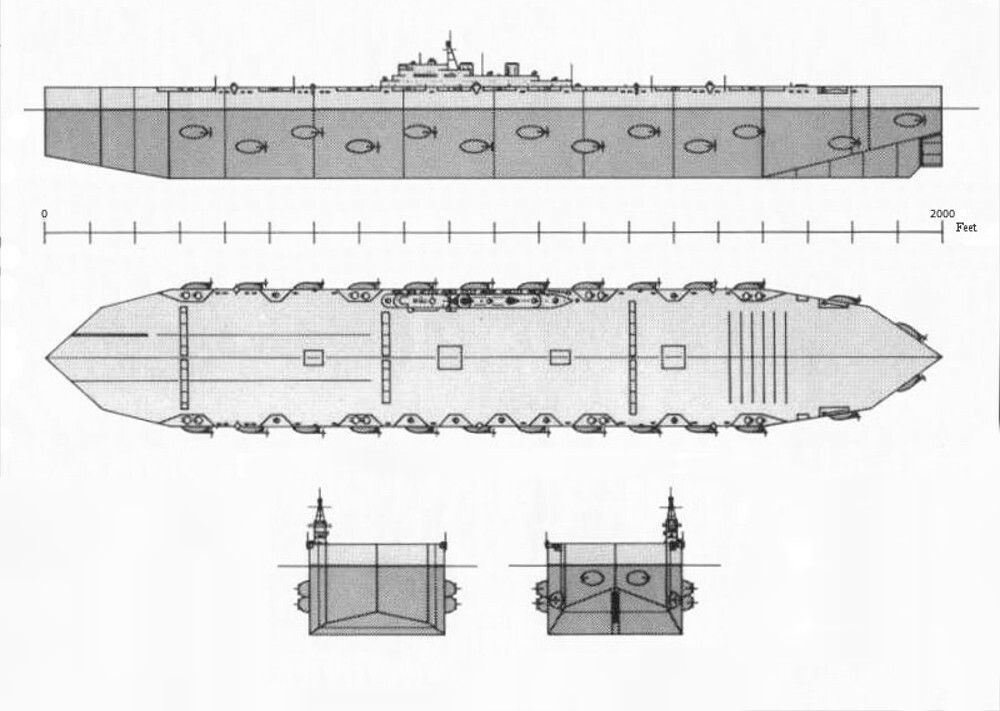
Conceptual design of Project Habakkuk aircraft carrier with 600-metre (1,969 ft) runway

Project Habakkuk or Habbakuk (spelling varies) was a plan by the British during the Second World War to construct an aircraft carrier out of pykrete, a mixture of wood pulp and ice, for use against German U-boats in the mid-Atlantic, which were beyond the flight range of land-based planes at that time. The plan was to create what would have been the largest ship ever at 600 metres (1,969 ft) long, which would have been much bigger than even the USS Enterprise and the USS Gerald R. Ford, the largest naval vessel ever, at 342 metres (1,122 ft) long. The idea came from Geoffrey Pyke, who worked for Combined Operations Headquarters. After promising scale tests and the creation of a prototype on Patricia Lake, Jasper National Park, in Alberta, Canada, the project was shelved due to rising costs, added requirements, and the availability of longer-range aircraft and escort carriers which closed the Mid-Atlantic gap that the project was intended to address.

== History ==
=== Initial concept ===
Geoffrey Pyke was an old friend of J. D. Bernal and had been recommended to Lord Louis Mountbatten, Chief of Combined Operations, by the cabinet minister Leopold Amery. Pyke worked at Combined Operations Headquarters (COHQ) alongside Bernal and was regarded as a genius by Mountbatten.

Pyke conceived the idea of Habakkuk while he was in the United States organising the production of M29 Weasels for Project Plough, a scheme to assemble an elite unit for winter operations in Norway, Romania and the Italian Alps. He had been considering the problem of how to protect seaborne landings and Atlantic convoys out of reach of aircraft cover. The problem was that steel and aluminium were in short supply, and were required for other purposes. Pyke decided that the answer was ice, which could be manufactured for just 1% of the energy needed to make an equivalent mass of steel. He proposed that an iceberg, natural or artificial, be levelled to provide a runway and hollowed out to shelter aircraft.

From New York, Pyke sent the proposal via diplomatic bag to COHQ, with a label forbidding anyone apart from Mountbatten from opening the package. Mountbatten in turn passed Pyke's proposal on to Churchill, who was enthusiastic about it.

Pyke was not the first to suggest a floating mid-ocean stopping point for aircraft, nor even the first to suggest that such a floating island could be made of ice. A German scientist, A. Gerke from Waldenburg, had proposed the idea and carried out some preliminary experiments on Lake Zurich in 1930. The idea was a recurring one: in 1940 an idea for an ice island was circulated around the Admiralty, but was treated as a joke by officers, including Nevil Shute, who circulated a memorandum that gathered ever more caustic comments. The document was retrieved just before it reached the First Sea Lord's inbox.

=== Code name and spelling ===
The project's code name was often incorrectly spelled Habbakuk in official documents. This may have been Pyke's error. At least one early unsigned document (apparently written by him) spells it Habbakuk. However, post-war publications by people concerned with the project, such as Perutz and Goodeve, all restore the proper spelling, with one "b" and three "k"s. The name is a reference to the project's ambitious goal:

Behold ye among the heathen, and regard, and wonder marvellously: for I will work a work in your days, which ye will not believe, though it be told you. Habakkuk 1:5

David Lampe, in his book, Pyke, the Unknown Genius, states that the name was derived from Voltaire's Candide and was misspelled by Pyke's Canadian secretary. However, the word does not actually appear in Candide, so this is probably inaccurate.

=== Pykrete ===
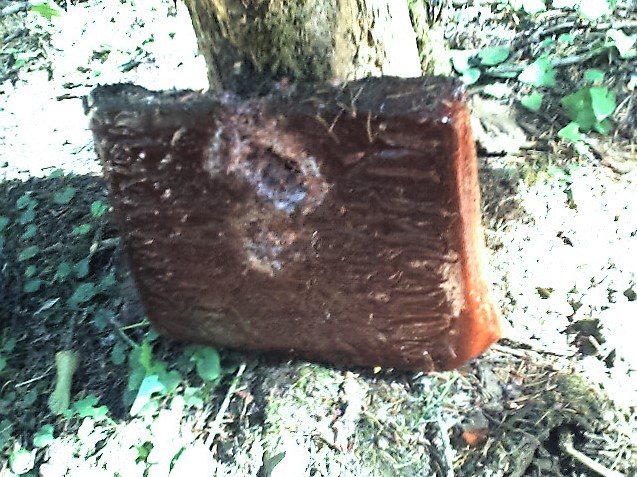
A block of pykrete

In early 1942 Pyke and Bernal called in Max Perutz to determine whether an icefloe large enough to withstand Atlantic conditions could be built up fast enough. Perutz pointed out that natural icebergs have too small a surface above water for an airstrip, and are prone to suddenly rolling over. The project would have been abandoned if it had not been for the invention of pykrete, a mixture of water and woodpulp that when frozen was stronger than plain ice, was slower-melting and would not sink. Developed by his government group and named after Pyke, it has been suggested that Pyke was inspired by Inuit sleds reinforced with moss. This is probably apocryphal, as the material was originally described in a paper by Mark and Hohenstein in Brooklyn.

Pykrete could be machined like wood and cast into shapes like metal, and when immersed in water formed an insulating shell of wet wood pulp on its surface that protected its interior from further melting. However, Perutz found a problem: ice flows slowly, in what is known as plastic flow, and his tests showed that a pykrete ship would slowly sag unless it was cooled to −16 °C (3 °F). To accomplish this the ship's surface would have to be protected by insulation, and it would need a refrigeration plant and a complicated system of ducts.

Perutz proceeded to conduct experiments on the viability of pykrete and its optimum composition in a secret location underneath Smithfield Meat Market in the City of London. The research took place in a refrigerated meat locker behind a protective screen of frozen animal carcasses.

=== Scale model ===
The decision was made to build a large-scale model at Jasper National Park in Canada to examine insulation and refrigeration techniques, and to see how pykrete would stand up to artillery and explosives. Large ice blocks were constructed at Lake Louise, Alberta, and a small prototype was constructed at Patricia Lake, Alberta, measuring 60 by 30 feet (18 metres by 9 metres), weighing 1,000 tons and kept frozen by a one-horsepower motor. The work was done by conscientious objectors who did alternative service of various kinds instead of military service. They were never told what they were building. Bernal informed COHQ that the Canadians were building a 1,000-ton model, and that it was expected to take eight men fourteen days to build it. The Chief of Combined Operations (CCO) responded that Churchill had invited the Chiefs of Staff Committee to arrange for an order to be placed for one complete ship at once, with the highest priority, and that further ships were to be ordered immediately if it appeared that the scheme was certain of success.

The Canadians were confident about constructing a vessel for 1944. The necessary materials were available to them in the form of 300,000 tons of wood pulp, 25,000 tons of fibreboard insulation, 35,000 tons of timber and 10,000 tons of steel. The cost was estimated at £700,000.

Meanwhile Perutz had determined via his experiments at Smithfield Market that the optimum structural properties were given by a mixture of 14 per cent wood pulp and 86 per cent water. He wrote to Pyke in early April 1943 and pointed out that if certain tests were not completed in May, there would be no chance of delivering a completed ship in 1944.

By May the problem of cold flow had become serious and it was obvious that more steel reinforcement would be needed, as well as a more effective insulating skin around the vessel's hull. This caused the cost estimate to grow to £2.5 million. In addition, the Canadians had decided that it was impractical to attempt the project "this coming season". Bernal and Pyke were forced to conclude that no Habakkuk vessel would be ready in 1944.

Pyke was excluded from the planning for Habakkuk in an effort to secure American participation, a decision that Bernal supported. Pyke's earlier disagreements with American personnel on Project Plough, which had caused his removal from that project, were the main factor in this decision.

Naval architects and engineers continued to work on Habakkuk with Bernal and Perutz during the summer of 1943. The requirements for the vessel became more demanding: it had to have a range of 7,000 miles (11,000 km) and be able to withstand the largest waves recorded, and the Admiralty wanted it to be torpedo-proof, which meant that the hull had to be at least 40 ft (12 m) thick. The Fleet Air Arm decided that heavy bombers should be able to take off from it, which meant that the deck had to be 2,000 ft (610 m) long. Steering also raised problems; it was initially projected that the ship would be steered by varying the speed of the motors on either side, but the Royal Navy decided that a rudder was essential. However, the problem of mounting and controlling a rudder over 100 ft (30 m) high was never solved.

=== Variants ===
Naval architects produced three alternative versions of Pyke's original concept, which were discussed at a meeting with the Chiefs of Staff in August 1943:

- Habakkuk I (soon discarded) would have been made of wood.
- Habakkuk II was closest to the COHQ model and would have been a very large, slow, self-propelled vessel made of pykrete with steel reinforcement. The size would have been a length of 2000 feet and a width of 300 feet.
- Habakkuk III was a smaller, faster version of Habakkuk II.
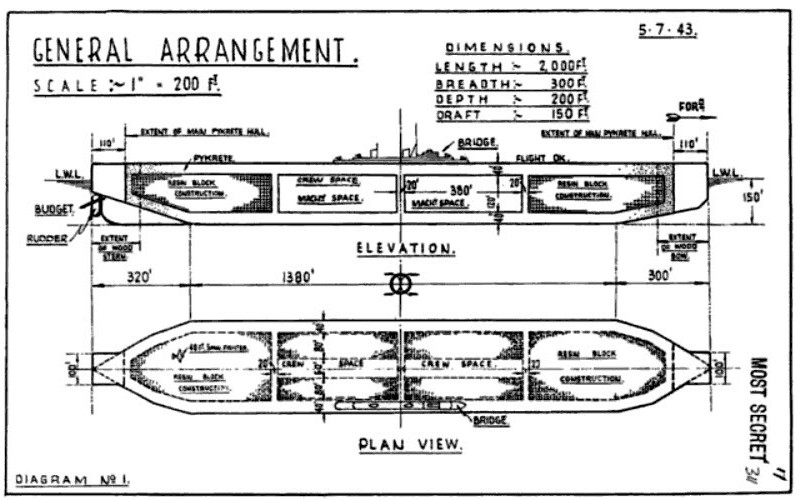
Aircraft carrier drawings.

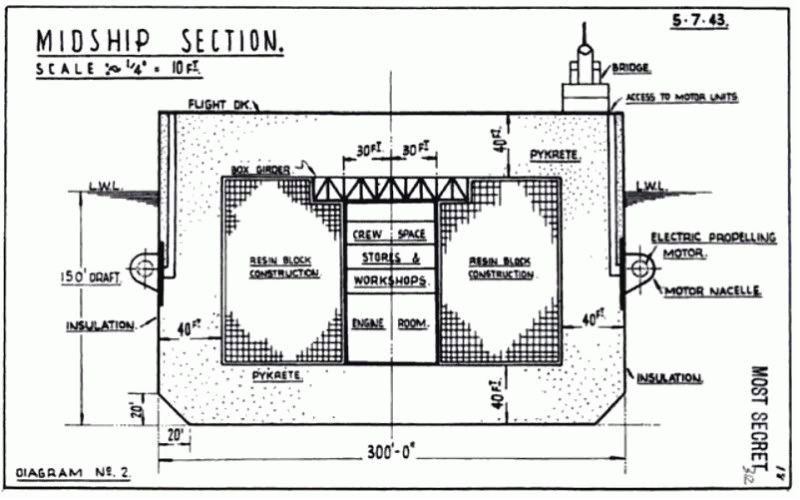
Cross section, showing 40 ft (12 m) thick walls made of pykrete

Air Chief Marshal Portal asked about potential bomb damage to Habakkuk III, and Bernal suggested that a certain amount of deck covering might be ripped off, but could be repaired by some kind of flexible matting. It would be more difficult to deal with bomb holes in the centre portion, though the roof over the aircraft hangars would be made blast proof against 1,000 kg bombs. Bernal considered that no one could say whether the larger Habakkuk II was a practical proposition until a large-scale model could be completed and tested in Canada in the spring of 1944. He had no doubts about the suitability of pykrete as a material, but said that constructional and navigational difficulties remained to be overcome.

The final design of Habakkuk II gave the bergship, as it was called, a displacement of 2.2 million tons. Steam turbogenerators were to supply 33,000 hp (25,000 kW) for 26 electric motors mounted in separate external nacelles (normal, internal ship engines would have generated too much heat for an ice craft). Its armament would have included 40 dual-barrelled 4.5" DP (dual-purpose) turrets and numerous light anti-aircraft guns, and it would have housed an airstrip and up to 150 twin-engined bombers or fighters.

== Shooting incident ==
According to some accounts, at the Quebec Conference in 1943 Lord Louis Mountbatten brought a block of pykrete along to demonstrate its potential to the admirals and generals who accompanied Winston Churchill and Franklin D. Roosevelt. Mountbatten entered the project meeting with two blocks and placed them on the ground. One was a normal ice block and the other was pykrete. He then drew his service pistol and shot at the first block. It shattered and splintered. Next he fired at the pykrete to give an idea of the resistance of that kind of ice to projectiles. The bullet ricocheted off the block, grazing the trouser leg of Admiral Ernest King, and ended up in the wall.

Sir Alan Brooke's diaries support this account, telling how Mountbatten brought two blocks, one of ice and one of pykrete. After first shooting at the ice, with a warning to beware of splinters, Mountbatten said "I shall fire at the block on the right to show you the difference". Brooke reported that "the bullet rebounded out of the block and buzzed round our legs like an angry bee".

Max Perutz gave an account of a similar incident in his book I Wish I Made You Angry Earlier. A demonstration of pykrete was given at Combined Operations Headquarters (COHQ) by a naval officer, Lieutenant Commander Douglas Adshead-Grant, who was provided by Perutz with rods of ice and pykrete packed with dry ice in thermos flasks and large blocks of ice and pykrete. Grant demonstrated the comparative strength of ice and pykrete by firing bullets into both blocks: the ice shattered, but the bullet rebounded from the pykrete and hit the Chief of Imperial General Staff Sir Alan Brooke in the shoulder.

== End of project ==
By the time of the 1943 Quebec Conference the Habakkuk project had won the support of both Churchill and Mountbatten, and was assigned to the National Research Council of Canada because of the cold Canadian winters and Canadians' prior familiarity with ice physics. The small prototype built in 1944 on Patricia Lake near Jasper, Alberta, confirmed the researchers' forecast that the full-size vessel would cost more money and machinery than a whole fleet of conventional aircraft carriers. (The sunken remains of the metal parts of the boat remain there to this day.) NRC President C. J. Mackenzie later said British promoters of Habakkuk were so intimidated by Prime Minister Churchill that they kept this information from him until Mackenzie's next visit to Britain.

Mountbatten later listed several reasons why the special boat's construction would be expensive and not needed:

- Demand for steel for other purposes was too great.
- Permission had been received from Portugal to use airfields in the Azores, which facilitated the hunting of U-boats in the Atlantic
- The introduction of long-range fuel tanks allowed British-based aircraft extra patrol time over the Atlantic
- The numbers of escort carriers were being increased.

In addition, Mountbatten himself withdrew from the project.

The final meeting of the Habakkuk board took place in December 1943. It was officially concluded that "The large Habbakuk II made of pykrete has been found to be impractical because of the enormous production resources required and technical difficulties involved."

The use of ice had actually been falling out of favour before that, and other ideas for "floating islands" had been considered, such as welding Liberty Ships or landing craft together (Project TENTACLE). It took three hot summers to completely melt the prototype constructed in Canada.

Perutz wrote that he stayed in Washington D.C. while U.S. Navy engineers evaluated the viability of Habakkuk. He concluded: "The U.S. Navy finally decided that Habakkuk was a false prophet. One reason was [that] the enormous amount of steel needed for the refrigeration plant that was to freeze the pykrete was greater than that needed to build the entire carrier of steel, but the crucial argument was that the rapidly increasing range of land-based aircraft rendered floating islands unnecessary."

== Criticism ==
The Habakkuk design received criticism, notably from Sir Charles F. Goodeve, Assistant Controller of Research and Development for the Admiralty during the Second World War. In an article published after the war Goodeve pointed out the large amount of wood pulp that would be required was enough to affect paper production significantly. He also claimed that each ship would require 40,000 tons of cork insulation, thousands of miles of steel tubing for brine circulation and four power stations, but that for all those resources (some of which could be used to manufacture conventional ships of more effective fighting power) Habakkuk would be capable of travelling at only 6 knots (11 km/h) of speed. His article also contained extensive derisive comments about the properties of ice as used for ship construction.

== Recent recreations ==
In the 15 April 2009 episode of the U.S. TV show MythBusters Jamie Hyneman and Adam Savage built a small flat-bottomed boat dubbed Yesterday's News out of a modified version of pykrete, using whole sheets of wet newspaper instead of wood pulp. They successfully piloted the boat in Alaskan waters at a speed of 25 miles per hour (40 km/h), but it began to leak through the melting pykrete in 20 minutes. After attempting to flash freeze leaks with a fire extinguisher and bailing the water with a hand pump, 10 minutes later Hyneman determined that the boat was taking on more water than the pump could remove and they headed back to shore, trailing sloughed portions of newspaper in their wake. They later inferred that it is possible to build a boat out of pykrete, and that pykrete lived up to its purported properties of being bullet-proof, stronger and taking longer to melt than ice. However, they expressed doubt that an aircraft carrier made of pykrete could have survived for long. The conclusion was "Plausible, but ludicrous."

In September 2010 the BBC programme Bang Goes the Theory also attempted to recreate a pykrete boat. A rough hull using 5,000 kilograms (11,000 lb) of hemp fibre pykrete was frozen in a coldstore, then launched in Portsmouth Harbour for a planned trip across the Solent to Cowes. The hull immediately started to leak because of the holes that had been cut in its rear to mount an outboard motor; the weight of the motor itself caused these holes to drop below the waterline.

== See also ==
- Mobile offshore base
- F.P.1 (a German film)
