= Pyramid Lake (Alberta) =

Lake in Alberta, Canada

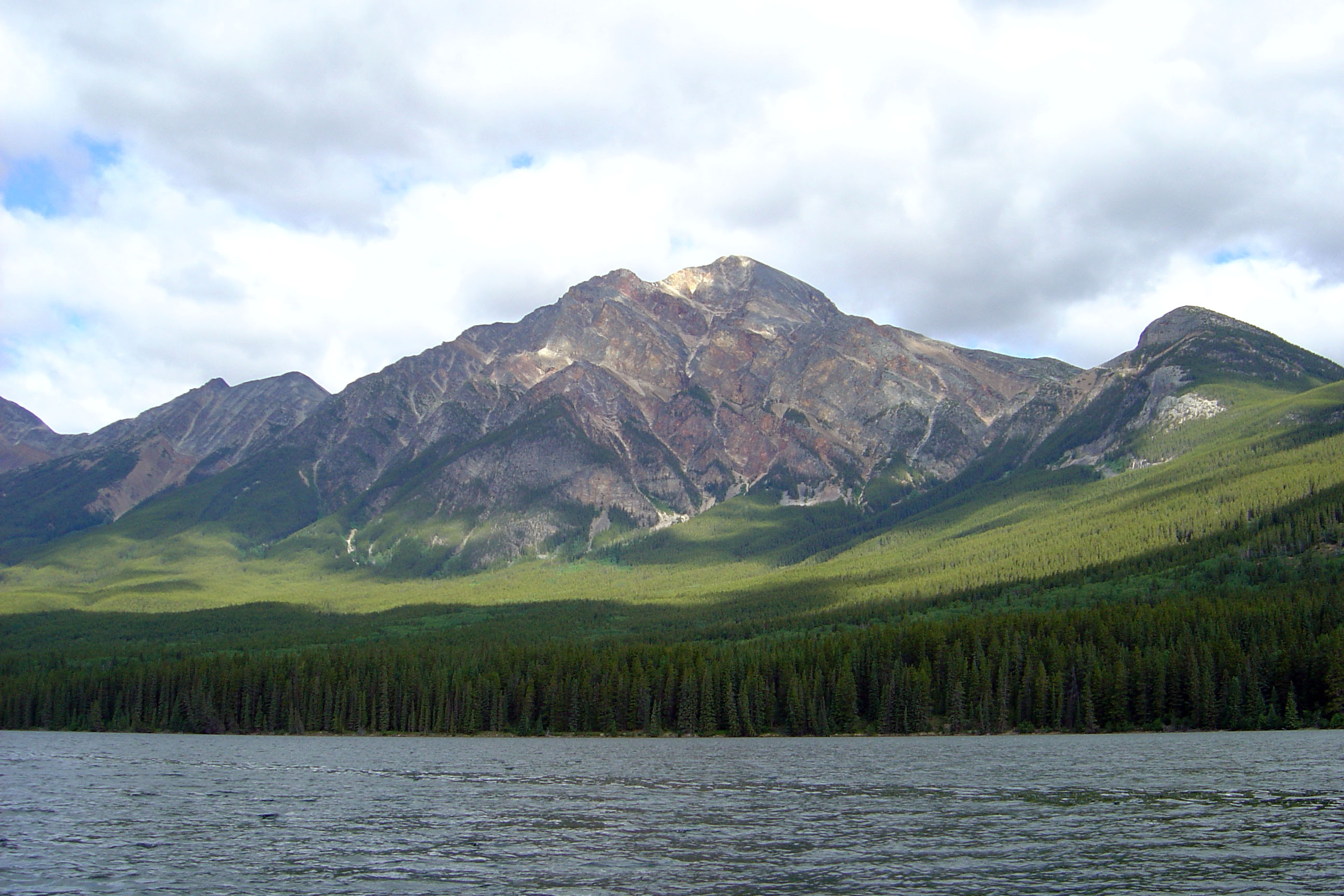
- With Pyramid Mountain in the background

- Location within Alberta
- Location: Jasper National Park, Alberta
- Coordinates: 52°55′21″N 118°05′46″W
- Primary outflows: Pyramid Creek
- Basin countries: Canada
- Max. length: 2.7 km (1.7 mi)
- Max. width: 0.5 km (0.31 mi)
- Surface area: 1.2 km^{2} (0.46 sq mi)
- Surface elevation: 1,180 m (3,870 ft)

Pyramid Lake is a kidney-shaped lake in Jasper National Park, Alberta, Canada. It lies at the foot of Pyramid Mountain, a natural landmark that overlooks the town of Jasper. It has a total area of 1.2 km^{2} (0.46 sq mi) and discharges in Athabasca River through the 2 km (1.2 mi) long Pyramid Creek.

Several picnic sites are established on the shores of the lake, as well as boat ramps. Pyramid Lake Lodge is located on the southeast point of the lake. Pyramid Island is a short distance from the resort, there is a small parking area which can be accessed by a road or hiking trails, then you cross a small wood foot bridge to the island itself, which has benches, picnic tables and a small open wooden shelter. Pyramid Lake is connected to the town of Jasper by Pyramid Lake Road and hiking trails, as well as hiking trails to other tourist sites such as Pyramid Mountain, Patricia Lake and Cabin Lake.

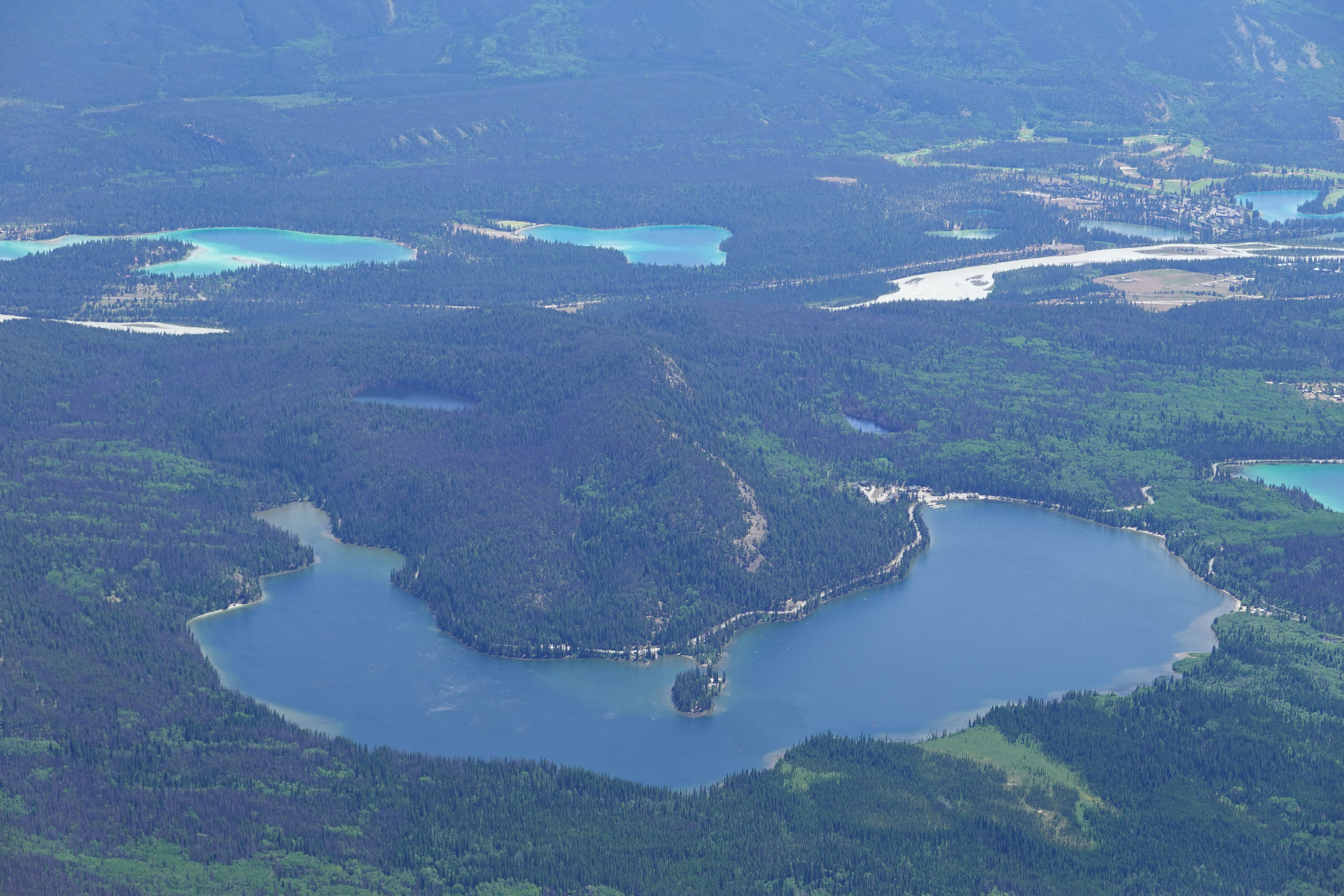
Pyramid Lake seen from Pyramid Mountain Summit

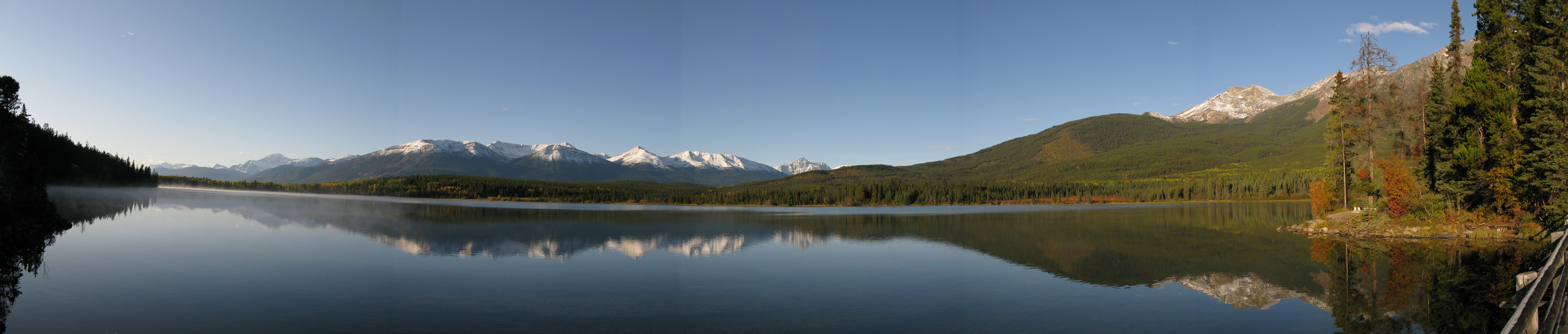
Pyramid Lake
