= Patricia Lake (Alberta) =

Lake in Alberta, Canada

Patricia Lake / Lake Patricia
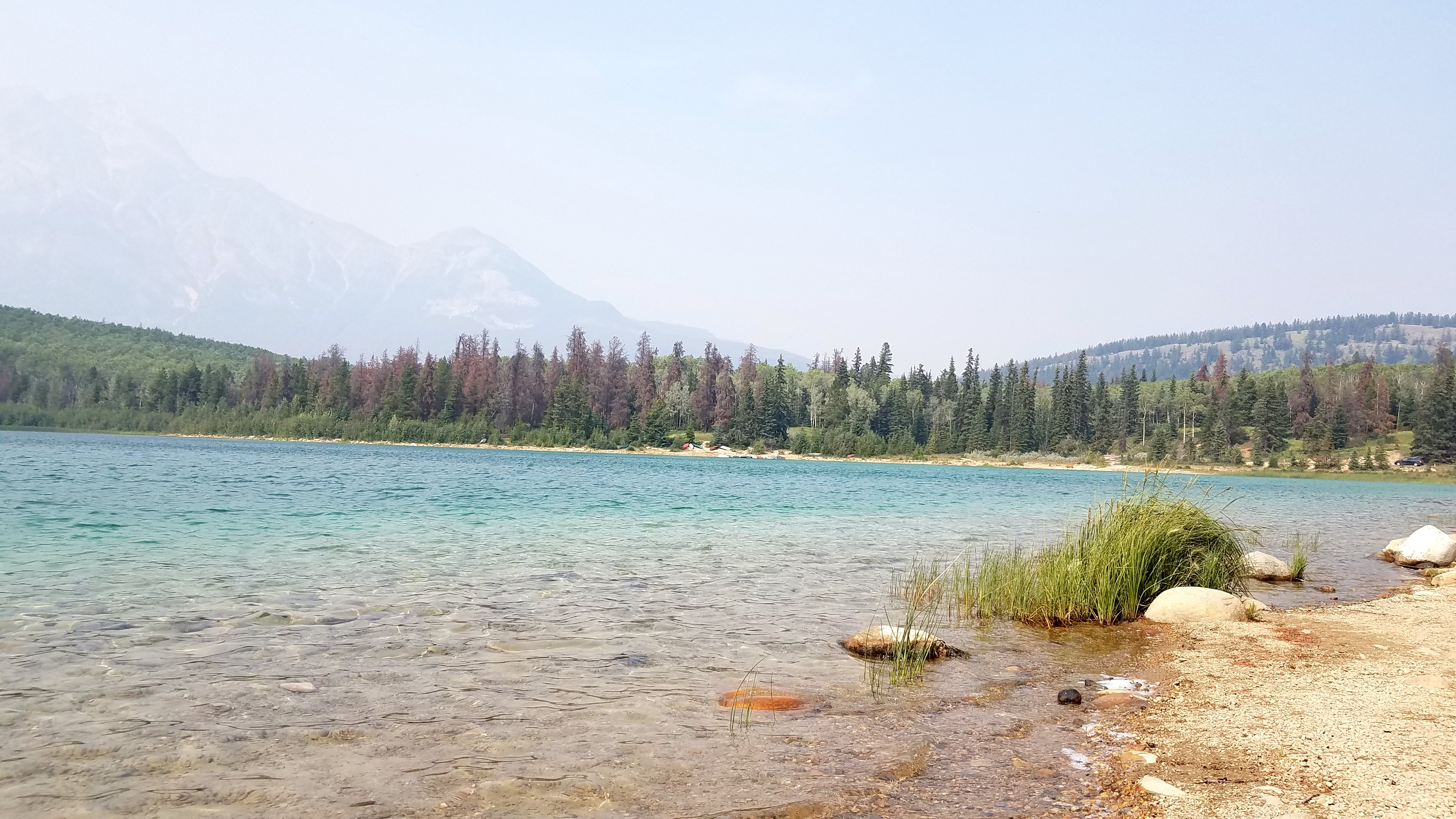
- Patricia Lake in Jasper National Park

- Location within Alberta
- Location: Jasper National Park, Alberta
- Coordinates: 52°54′10″N 118°06′07″W
- Basin countries: Canada
- Average depth: 30 metres (98 ft)
- Surface elevation: c. 4,000 ft (1,200 m)

Patricia Lake is a lake in Jasper National Park, Alberta, Canada, near the town of Jasper. It was named for Princess Patricia of Connaught, a granddaughter of Queen Victoria.

It is connected by Pyramid Lake road and hiking trails to the town of Jasper, as well as other tourist sites such as Pyramid Lake and Pyramid Mountain.

== Project Habbakuk ==
Patricia Lake is notable for its involvement during World War II with Project Habbakuk, a plan to build an unsinkable aircraft carrier from an ice-based composite material termed "Pykrete".

Initial studies of natural lake ice had been carried out at Lake Louise. In January 1943, Patricia Lake was chosen as the test site for building a prototype vessel. The planned vessel was to be 2,000 feet (600 m) long and the prototype was to be a 1:10 scale model of this. In fact, the beam was to approximately this scale, but the length was only 60 feet, about a third of scale.

Patricia Lake was chosen for this work on account of having rail connections at Jasper and being a suitably cold, remote area that already had military training involvement in the area as camouflage. There were also Mennonite and Doukhobor communities nearby, religious conscientious objectors, who could provide the labour needed.

Pykrete construction material for the full-sized ship was to be a composite of ice and sawdust, maintained by refrigeration. The first experiments had used natural lake ice, in a Canadian winter. The model ship was to use plain ice, but partly natural and partly refrigerated. Construction proceeded through March 1943 by building a wooden cabin on the frozen lake, installing refrigeration equipment and a nest of 6 inch cold air ducts, and then increasing the height of the ice wall around the cabin. As weight increased, the bottom of the "hull" was sawn free from the lake ice and the model floated free. In June the refrigeration was switched off, but the model lasted the whole summer before melting and sinking.

A diving expedition to the site in 1985 found the remains of the model on a steep slope just off-shore at a depth between 26 and 43 metres (85 and 141 ft). Although the refrigeration equipment was removed before sinking, the wooden walls of the hull, an "incredible jumble" of cold air ductwork and also a great quantity of the bitumen used as part of the insulation remained at the site. As of June 26, 2011 only the west wall of the structure remained intact; the rest has fallen to pieces and lies at depths of between 40 and 90 feet (12 and 27 m) in depth. An underwater plaque at the site notes its part in World War II history.

The site continues to be visited by recreational divers. The wreckage has deteriorated in recent years and has suffered from vandalism and graffiti.

== Gallery ==
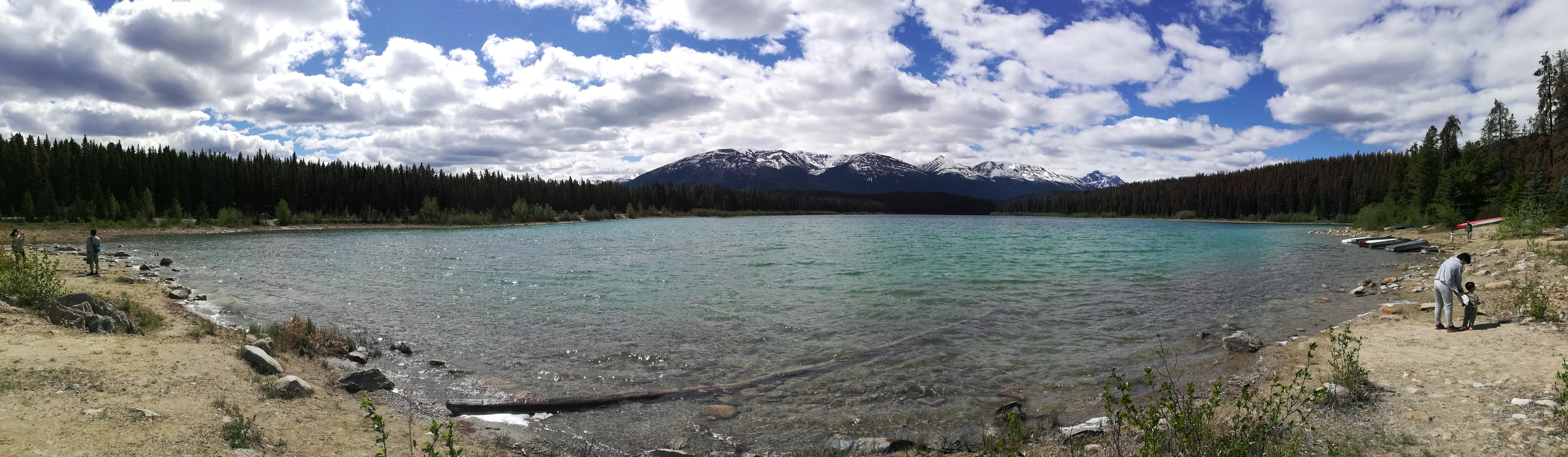
Patricia Lake panorama

== See also ==
- Royal eponyms in Canada
- Edziza obsidian
