= William Broadhurst Brierley =

English mycologist

William Broadhurst Brierley (1889–1963) was an English mycologist. He is known particularly for his work on grey mould.

== Life ==
Brierley had a deprived background, and was brought up in a poor district of Manchester. At 14 he became a pupil-teacher in his elementary school. He went into teacher training at Victoria University of Manchester, and then moved to the botany course. There he studied under Frederick Ernest Weiss at At this period he taught evening classes to support himself. With an honours degree of 1911 in botany, he went on at Manchester to complete an M.Sc. He married in July 1914: he knew Susan Fairhurst through the undergraduate Sociological Society. They lived in Levenshulme. He was then an assistant lecturer in economic botany and demonstrator at Manchester.

During World War I, Brierley took up in 1915 a post as assistant in plant pathology at the Royal Botanic Gardens, Kew, and the couple moved to Richmond, London. He then served in the Artists' Rifles, being invalided out in 1916. He returned to a post at Kew, studying fungal disease in vegetables. In 1918 he moved, and founded a mycology department at Rothamsted Experimental Station.

In 1934 Brierley became professor of agricultural botany at the University of Reading, as successor to John Percival. He retired in 1954. In later life, he and his second wife Marjorie Brierley resided in the Newlands Valley.

== Works ==
In 1916 Brierley showed that shab, a disease of lavender plants, was fungal, caused by a fungus that attacked parts of the plant above ground. The disease was further investigated by Charles Russell Metcalfe (1904–1991). His work in 1918 clarified the life cycle of Botrytis cinerea, the "grey mould" fungus. In the 1920s, he with colleagues made standard a dilution plate technique for studying soil fungi.

For 25 years, Brierley edited the Annals of Applied Biology. He translated the Pflanzliche Infektionslehre (1946) of Ernst Albert Gäumann as Principles of Plant Infection (1950).

== Family ==
Brierley married, firstly, in 1914 Susan Sutherland Fairhurst. They were divorced, after a separation that began around 1918; and in 1922 she married Nathan Isaacs. Brierley's second wife was Marjorie Brierley.
