= Lionel Edward Pyke =

Lionel Edward Pyke (1854–1899) an English-Jewish barrister, born at Chatham, Kent, England on 21 April 1854 and died in Brighton, Sussex, England on 26 March 1899. He was the second son of Joseph Pyke, warden of the Central Synagogue, London, father of Geoffrey Pyke, an inventor and uncle of scientist and TV personality Magnus Pyke.

== Family, hobbies and education ==
Pyke was educated at Rochester Cathedral Grammar School and at the University of London, where he earned the degrees of LLB and BA He entered as a student of the Inner Temple on 3 November 1874, and was called to the bar on 13 June 1877. He took a great interest in yachting and developed an Admiralty practice.

== Professional experience ==
His most extensive practise was in the Admiralty Court; he became Queen's Counsel in February 1892, and immediately attained a leading position in the Admiralty Court; he became the leader of that branch of the bar designated as the Probate, Divorce, and Admiralty division on the elevation of Sir W. Phillimore to the bench. In 1895, Pyke unsuccessfully ran for the House of Commons in the Wilton division, Wiltshire, as a Liberal Party candidate.

== Judaism ==
As noted, Pyke's father was the warden of the Central Synagogue, London. In 1880, Pyke became a member of the council of the Anglo-Jewish Association, and served on the executive committee from 1882 until his death.
