= It's Decorative Gourd Season, Motherfuckers =

Essay parodying fans of autumn

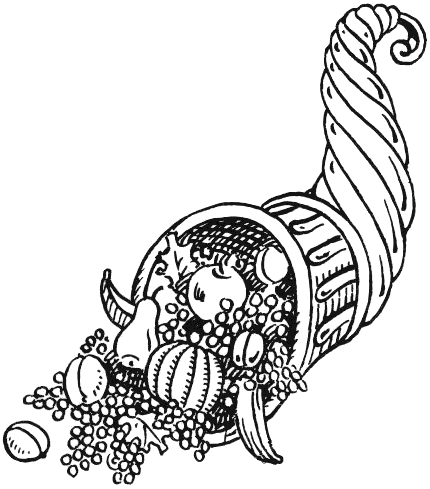
A cornucopia, the type of autumnal display parodied by the essay

"It's Decorative Gourd Season, Motherfuckers" is a 2009 essay by Colin Nissan that was published in McSweeney's Internet Tendency. The essay parodies people who are enthusiastic fans of autumn. Each year, the piece goes viral at the beginning of autumn in the Northern Hemisphere and has spawned parodies and spin-offs.

== Creation ==
Nissan, who is a self-proclaimed fan of autumn, pitched the essay to McSweeney's Internet Tendency in 2009. At first, Nissan was unsure about the profanity-heavy piece. However, with the help of the McSweeney's editor, Nissan narrowed down the curse words used to just the word "fuck" and modified the ending with the aim of making the essay funnier and more positive.

== Synopsis ==
The piece is written from the point of view of a person who is obsessed with autumn. The narrator, feeling the change of the season, wants to engage in a number of stereotypical autumnal activities such as placing "shellacked vegetables" into a wicker cornucopia to make a centerpiece for a table. The piece both parodies and celebrates autumn and the people who are enthusiastic about the season by highlighting contradictions between the "Genteel, white, upper class, rural or suburban" world of people popularly conceived as to be fans of autumn and decorative gourds, and the "gritty, expletive-filled diatribe of excess" presented by the essay.

== Impact ==
When the essay was released, it garnered one million views in several days. As of 2019, the essay is McSweeney's Internet Tendency's second-most-read piece. Every year since its publication at the start of autumn in the Northern Hemisphere, the piece goes viral on social media. At least a dozen monologues of readers performing the essay have been posted to YouTube.

Nissan was not paid for the essay and receives no royalties from the piece's yearly popularity. However, he does receive royalties from the mug that McSweeney's made with a quote from the essay. Nissan enjoys the notoriety that comes from writing a piece of perennial viral content and thinks it "is much more than I could ever have gotten from a residual".

The essay has been referred to as "the fall season's most iconic essay" by Randall Colburn of The A.V. Club. The piece has become an ode to autumn and has spawned spin-offs such as "It's Scorpio season, motherfuckers". Martha Stewart has referenced the piece claiming that decorative gourd season is not overrated.
