= Ground freezing =

Construction technique

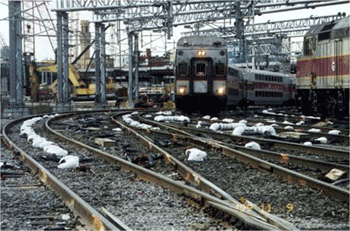
Artificial ground freezing allowed tunnels to be excavated under an active railyard during Boston's Big Dig. Each white lump marks the top of a deep ground-freezing tap.

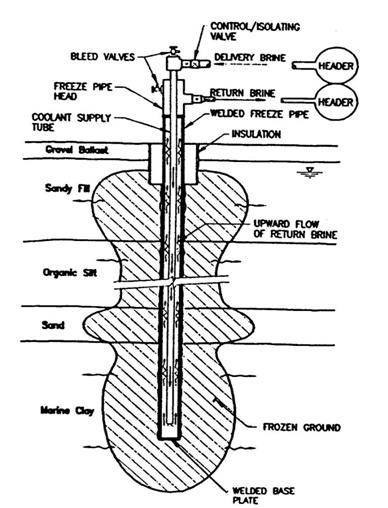
Cross section of an artificial ground freezing pipe as used in the Big Dig.

Artificial ground freezing is a construction technique used in circumstances where soil needs to be stabilized so it will not collapse next to excavations, or to prevent contaminants spilled into soil from being leached away. Artificial ground freezing was used for the first time in 1862 in Swansea, South Wales, UK by Siebe Gorman & Co. The system was applied for a coal mine shaft sinking.

Pipes are run through the soil to be frozen, and then refrigerants are run through the pipes, freezing the soil.

== Design ==
Some artificial ground freezing projects use common salt brine as the refrigerant, but other projects benefit from using more exotic refrigerants, like liquid nitrogen or solid carbon dioxide ('dry ice').

== Examples ==
Soil contaminated with radioactive elements that leaked from Japan's Fukushima Daiichi nuclear power plant was contained through artificial ground freezing.

A project in Boston known as the Big Dig used artificial ground freezing during some of its tunneling, to allow its wide tunnels to be built under or through soil that supported existing infrastructure that would have been difficult or expensive to support using more traditional excavation methods.

In northern Canada and arctic Alaska, passive pipe systems are used that do not require any external power to keep the ground frozen. These systems use in-ground evaporators and above-ground radiators filled with liquid refrigerant. When ambient temperatures fall below ground temperatures, the liquid vapor starts condensing in the radiator, reducing the pressure in the system causing the liquid in the evaporator to boil and evaporate. This process results in heat transfer from the ground to the air and keeps the ground in a permanent frozen state.

Hani and Evirgen (2023) introduced a new method for sampling granular soils without disturbing their natural state; they suggest using artificial artificial ground freezing, a ground enhancement technique, as an on-site option for deep excavation applications.

== See also ==
- Pykrete, a composite building material which utilizes similar properties in frozen sawdust, Hani and Evirgen investigated the mechanical and microstructural properties of an artificially frozen sawdust-ice mixture (pykrete) and its usability as a retaining structure. In addition, they developed an uncoupled thermo-hydro-mechanical approach to simulate a pykrete diaphragm wall for numerical analysis using finite element methods.
