= Pykrete =

Ice alloy containing sawdust or another form of wood pulp

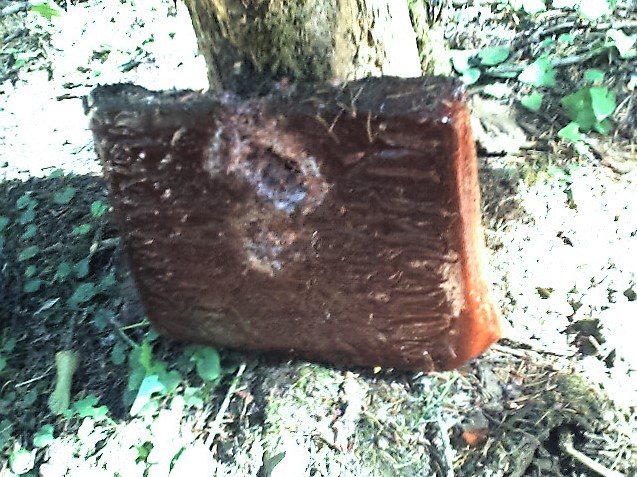
A slab of pykrete

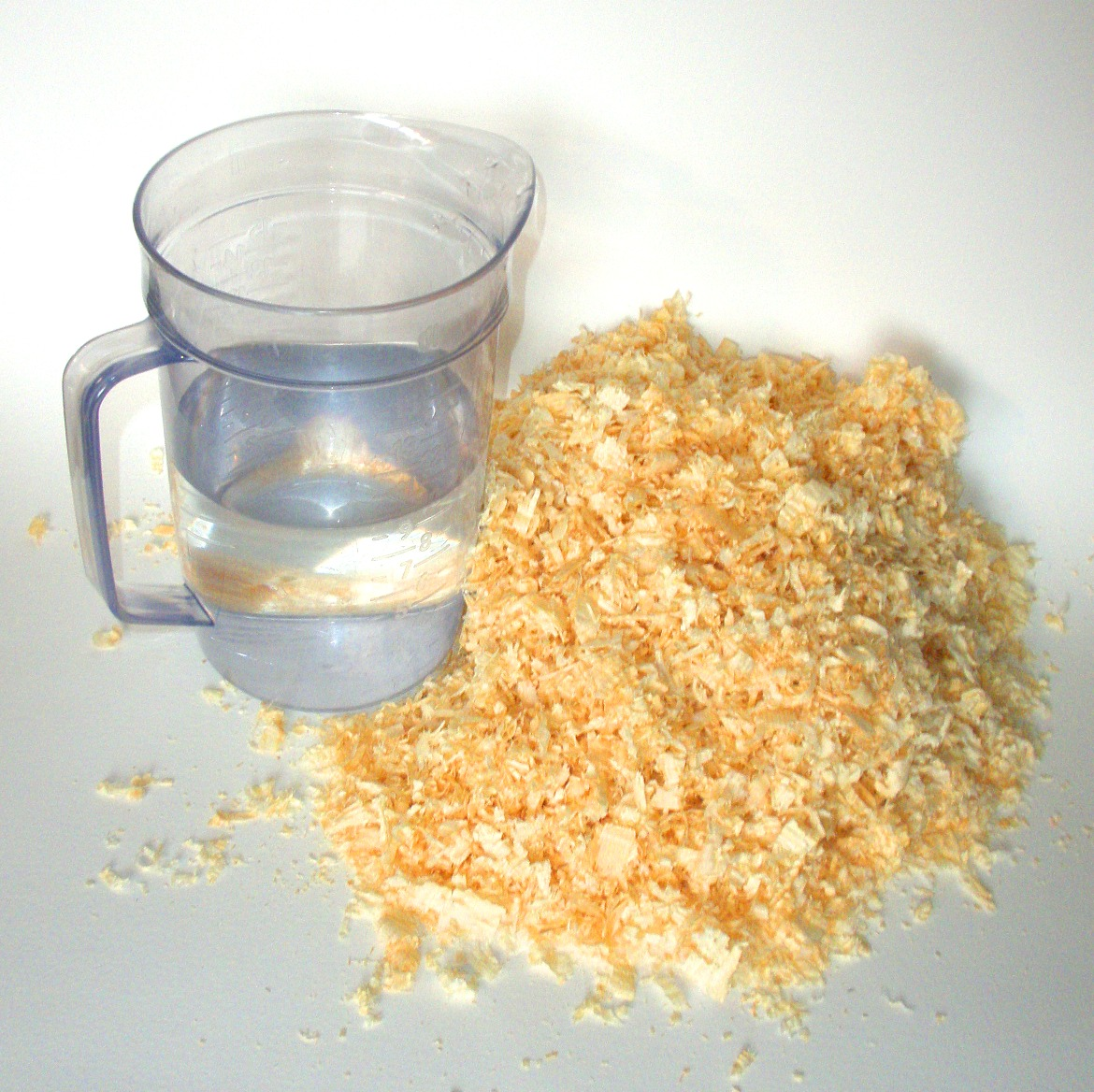
Pykrete is made of 14% sawdust and 86% water by mass.

Pykrete (/ˈpaɪkriːt/, PIE-creet) is a frozen ice composite, originally made of approximately 14% sawdust or some other form of wood pulp (such as paper) and 86% ice by weight (6 to 1 by weight).

During World War II, Geoffrey Pyke proposed it as a candidate material for a supersized aircraft carrier for the British Royal Navy. Pykrete features unusual properties, including a relatively slow melting rate due to its low thermal conductivity, as well as a vastly improved strength and toughness compared to ordinary ice. These physical properties can make the material comparable to concrete, as long as the material is kept frozen.

Pykrete is slightly more difficult to form than concrete, as it expands during the freezing process. However, it can be repaired and maintained using seawater as a raw material. The mixture can be moulded into any shape and frozen, and it will be tough and durable, as long as it is kept at or below freezing temperature. Resistance to gradual creep or sagging is improved by lowering the temperature further, to −15 °C (5 °F).

== History ==
=== During World War II ===
Geoffrey Pyke managed to convince Lord Mountbatten of the potential of his proposal (actually prior to the invention of pykrete) sometime around 1942, and trials were made at two locations in Alberta, Canada. The idea for a ship made of ice impressed the United States and Canada enough that a 60-foot-long (18 m), 1,000-ton ship was built in one month on Patricia Lake in the Canadian Rockies. However, it was constructed using plain ice (from the lake), before pykrete was proposed. It took slightly more than an entire summer to melt, but plain ice proved to be too weak. Pyke learned from a report by Herman Mark and his assistant that ice made from water mixed with wood fibres formed a strong solid mass—much stronger than pure water ice. Max Perutz later recalled:

Then, one day, Pyke handed me a report that he said he found hard to understand. It was by Herman Mark, my former professor of physical chemistry in Vienna, who had lost his post there when the Nazis overran Austria and found a haven at the Polytechnic Institute of Brooklyn. As an expert on plastics, he knew that many of them were brittle when pure, but could be toughened by embedding fibres such as cellulose in them, just as concrete can be reinforced with steel wires. Mark and his assistant, Walter P. Hohenstein, stirred a little cotton wool or wood pulp—the raw material of newsprint—into water before they froze it, and found that these additions strengthened the ice dramatically.

When I had read their report, I advised my superiors to scrap our experiments with pure ice and set up a laboratory for the manufacture and testing of reinforced ice. Combined Operations requisitioned a large meat store five floors underground beneath Smithfield Market, which lies within sight of St. Paul's Cathedral, and ordered some electrically heated suits, of the type issued to airmen, to keep us warm at less than 0 °C (32 °F) temperatures. They detailed some young commandos to work as my technicians, and I invited Kenneth Pascoe, who was then a physics student and later became a lecturer in engineering at Cambridge, to come and help me. We built a big wind tunnel to freeze the mush of wet wood pulp and sawed the reinforced ice into blocks. Our tests soon confirmed Mark and Hohenstein's results. Blocks of ice containing as little as four percent wood pulp were weight for weight as strong as concrete; in honor of the originator of the project, we called this reinforced ice "pykrete". When we fired a rifle bullet into an upright block of pure ice two feet square and one foot thick, the block shattered; in pykrete the bullet made a little crater and was embedded without doing any damage. My stock rose, but no one would tell me what pykrete was needed for, except that it was for Project Habakkuk.

— Perutz, Max, I Wish I'd Made You Angry Earlier

Perutz would later learn that Project Habakkuk was the plan to build an enormous aircraft carrier, actually more of a floating island than a ship in the traditional sense. The experiments of Perutz and his collaborators in Smithfield Meat Market in the City of London took place in great secrecy behind a screen of animal carcasses. The tests confirmed that pykrete is much stronger than pure ice and does not shatter, but also that it sags under its own weight at temperatures higher than −15 °C (5 °F).

Mountbatten's reaction to the breakthrough is recorded by Pyke's biographer David Lampe:

What happened next was explained several years after the war by Lord Mountbatten in a widely-quoted after-dinner speech. "I was sent to Chequers to see the Prime Minister and was told he was in his bath. I said, 'Good, that's exactly where I want him to be.' I nipped up the stairs and called out to him, 'I have a block of a new material which I would like to put in your bath.' After that, he suggested that I should take it to the Quebec Conference." The demonstration in Churchill's steaming bath had been most dramatic. After the outer film of ice on the small pykrete cube had melted, the freshly exposed wood pulp kept the remainder of the block from thawing.

— Lampe, David, Pyke, the Unknown Genius

Another tale is that at the Quebec Conference of 1943, Mountbatten brought a block of pykrete along to demonstrate its potential to the entourage of admirals and generals who had come along with Winston Churchill and Franklin D. Roosevelt. Mountbatten entered the project meeting with two blocks and placed them on the ground. One was a normal ice block and the other was pykrete. He then drew his service pistol and shot at the first block. It shattered and splintered. Next, he fired at the pykrete to give an idea of the resistance of that kind of ice to projectiles. The bullet ricocheted off the block, grazing the trouser leg of Admiral Ernest King and ending up in the wall. According to Perutz's own account, however, the incident of a ricochetting bullet hitting an Admiral actually happened much earlier in London and the gun was fired by someone on the project—not Mountbatten.

Despite these tests, the main Project Habakkuk was never put into action because of limitations in funds and the belief that the tides of the war were beginning to turn in favour of the Allies using more conventional methods.

According to the memoirs of British General Ismay:

A good deal of consideration, much of it highly technical, was also given to the feasibility of building floating platforms which could either be used by fighters to support opposed landings until such time as airfields ashore were available, or act as staging points for ferrying aircraft over long distances. The idea as originally conceived by a member of Combined Operations staff, and vehemently supported by Mountbatten, was that these floating platforms should be constructed out of icebergs. They would be provided with engines which would enable them to steam at slow speed, and with refrigeration plants to prevent them melting. They would be unsinkable. The whole thing seemed completely fantastic, but the idea was not abandoned without a great deal of investigation. Various alternative methods of construction were then considered by the United States naval authorities, but in the end there was general agreement that carriers and auxiliary carriers would serve the same purpose more effectively.

— General Lord Ismay

=== After World War II ===
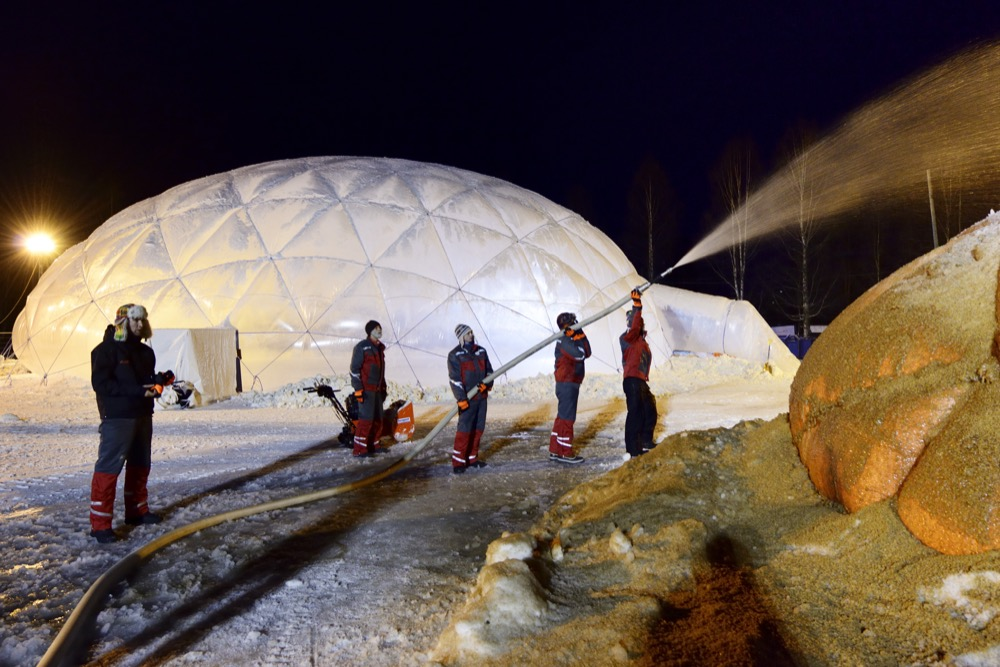
Construction of a pykrete-reinforced ice dome by Eindhoven University of Technology

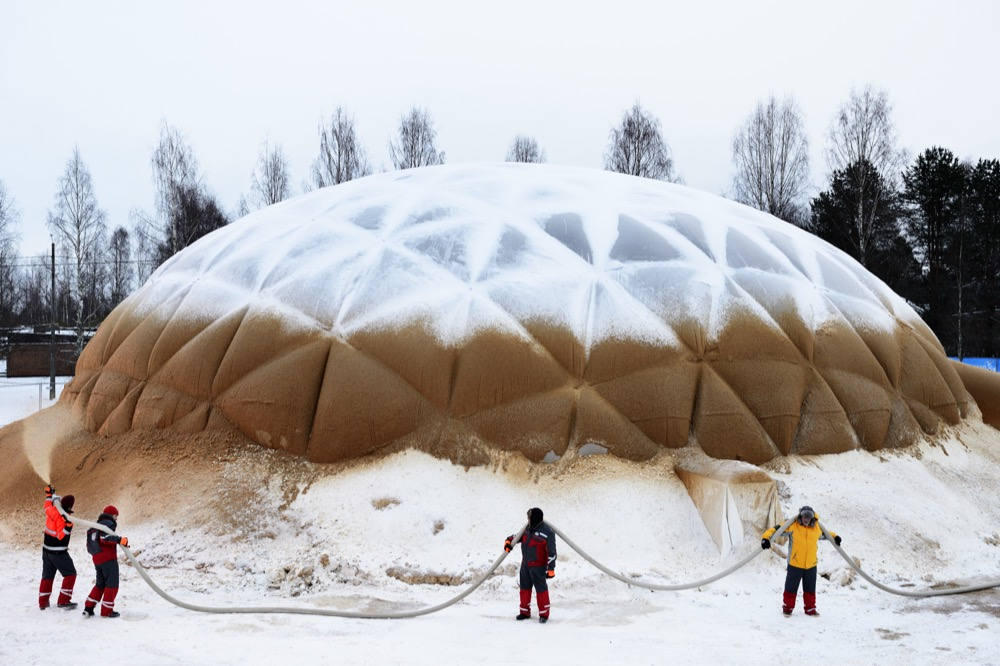
Daytime view of the ice dome

Since World War II, pykrete has remained a scientific curiosity, unexploited by research or construction of any significance. However, new concepts for pykrete crop up occasionally among architects, engineers and futurists, usually regarding its potential for mammoth offshore construction or its improvement by applying super-strong materials such as synthetic composites or Kevlar.

In 1985, pykrete was considered for a quay in Oslo harbour. However, the idea was later shelved, considering pykrete's unreliability in the real-world environment. Since pykrete needs to be preserved at or below freezing point, and tends to sag under its own weight at temperatures above −15 °C (5 °F), an alternative was considered that would guarantee effectiveness and public safety.

In 2011, the Vienna University of Technology successfully built a pykrete ice dome, measuring 10 metres (33 ft) in diameter in the Austrian village of Obergurgl. They improved on an original Japanese technique of spraying ice on a balloon by using the natural properties of ice and its strength. This structure managed to stand for three months before sunlight started melting the ice, rendering the structure unreliable. Researcher Johann Kollegger of Vienna University of Technology thinks his team's alternative new method is easier, avoiding icy sprayback onto the workers. To build their freestanding structure, Kollegger and his colleagues first cut an 8-inch (200 mm) plate of ice into 16 segments. To sculpt the segments to have a dome-like curve, the researchers relied on ice's creep behavior. If pressure is applied to ice, it slowly changes its shape without breaking. One of the mechanisms by which glaciers move, called glacial creep, functions similarly, the researchers say.

In 2014, the Eindhoven University of Technology worked on a pykrete architecture project in Nunnanlahti, a village in Juuka, Finland, which included an ice dome and a pykrete scale model of the Sagrada Família. They attempted to build the largest ice dome in the world. Due to human error, the plug to a compressor that kept the balloon inflated was pulled, leading to the balloon deflating. The team of Dutch students quickly re-inflated the balloon, and resprayed the part of the dome that had collapsed. They continued with their construction, and eventually opened the dome to the public. However within a matter of days the roof caved in; there were no visitors on the site at the time.

== Mechanical properties ==
The durability of pykrete is still debated. Perutz has estimated a crushing strength of around 1,100 psi (7.6 MPa).

A September 1943 proposal for making smaller pykrete vessels included the following table of characteristics:

Comparative properties of materials
Mechanical properties	Ice	Concrete	Pykrete
Crushing strength [MPa]	3.447	17.240	7.584
Tensile strength [MPa]	1.103	1.724	4.826
Density [kg/m^{3}]	910	2500	980

== In the media ==
In 2009, the Discovery Channel program MythBusters episode 115 tested the properties of pykrete and the myths behind it. First, the program's primary hosts, Adam Savage and Jamie Hyneman, compared the mechanical properties of common ice, pykrete, and a new material specially created for the show, dubbed "super pykrete", which used newspapers instead of woodpulp. Both versions of pykrete indeed proved to be much stronger than the chunk of ice, withstanding hundreds of pounds of weight. The super pykrete was much stronger than the original version.

The MythBusters then built a full-size boat out of the super pykrete, naming it Yesterday's News, and subjected it to real-world conditions. The MythBusters vessel did not contain refrigeration units to keep the pykrete frozen as the original plans called for, and the boat had a much thinner construction than the massive ships proposed in World War II. Though the boat managed to float and stay intact at speeds of up to 23 miles per hour (37 km/h), it quickly began to spring leaks as the boat slowly melted. After 20 minutes the boat was deteriorating, and the experiment was ended. The boat lasted another 10 minutes while being piloted back to shore. Though the boat worked, it was noted that it would be highly impractical for the original proposal, which claimed that an entire aircraft carrier could be built out of pykrete. Their conclusion was "Plausible, but ludicrous", since it would involve building vessels out of tens of thousands of tons of the material that would sink without being kept cool.

In the same year, the story of Pyke and pykrete in the Second World War also played an important role in Giles Foden's book Turbulence, about a (fictitious) British meteorologist and his contributions to D-Day weather forecasting. The main character is also involved in the post-War pykrete effort.

In 2010, the BBC programme Bang Goes the Theory episode 26 tested a 20-foot (6.1 m), 5-tonne pykrete boat made with hemp rather than wood pulp. All four presenters, Jem Stansfield, Dallas Campbell, Liz Bonnin, and Yan Wong, had to be rescued from Portsmouth Harbour after the boat took on water through the engine mounts. It eventually capsized after melting much faster than anticipated in the warmer-than-expected September waters.

2013 German TV station WDR's programme Kopfball experimented with pykrete but replaced the woodpulp by hemp-fibres. A 5 cm (2.1 inch)-thick plate withstood even more than 80 kg without breaking, it only started to bend.

Neal Stephenson's 2015 novel Seveneves describes the fictional use of pykrete to construct low Earth orbit habitats and spaceship hulls.

99% Invisible's third volume of mini-stories podcasts includes an article about Project Habbakuk and the creation, proposal, and eventual scrapping of pykrete as a useful building material during WWII.

The Science & Futurism with Isaac Arthur YouTube episode "Colonizing Ceres" describes the fictional use of pykrete to construct a dome habitat on an asteroid to be mined.

In the 2025 episode "All Hallows Eve" of The Brokenwood Mysteries, the murder weapon turns out to be a pykrete knife.

== See also ==
- Cement-bonded wood fiber
- Ground freezing, a construction technique using similar properties of frozen soil
