= Family Planning Association =

UK sexual health charity (1930–2019)

FPA
- Founded: 1930
- Dissolved: 15 May 2019
- Type: Sexual health charity
- Registration no.: 250187
- Purpose: Sexual health information, contraception, abortion rights
- Location: 23–28 Penn Street, London N1 5DL
- Region served: United Kingdom
- Key people: President: Baroness Gould of Potternewton; Chief Executive: Dr Audrey Simpson OBE; Chair of the Board of Trustees: Dr Val Day
- Employees: 60
- Volunteers: 25
- Website: www.fpa.org.uk
- Formerly called: Family Planning Association

The Family Planning Association (FPA) was a UK registered charity working to enable people to make informed choices about sex and to enjoy sexual health. It was the national affiliate for the International Planned Parenthood Federation in the United Kingdom. Founded in 1930, the FPA celebrated its 80th anniversary in 2010. Its motto was "Talking sense about sex". The charity was placed into liquidation on 15 May 2019, but the FPA name continues as a limited company selling sexual health resources.

== History ==
The FPA was founded in 1930 when five birth control societies merged to form the National Birth Control Council (NBCC). Charles Vickery Drysdale FRSE was important during its foundation. Its stated purpose was "that married people may space or limit their families and thus mitigate the evils of ill health and poverty". The NBCC changed its name to the National Birth Control Association (NBCA) in 1931, and then to the Family Planning Association (FPA) in 1939. From 1998 it was known as the FPA.

The FPA was heavily invested in guaranteeing and standardising the various contraceptive methods it prescribed using modern science and medicine. From its inception, the association invested heavily in developing and implementing tests for chemical efficacy and safety and rubber quality. These findings were published after 1937 in its annual Approved List of contraceptives.

Originally only offering a service to married couples, during the 1950s FPA clinics began to offer pre-marital advice to women, although proof, such as a letter from a vicar or family doctor, was often required before contraceptive supplies were provided. Only in 1964 did they begin to provide un-married woman with contraceptives.

During the 1960s, social and sexual attitudes changed dramatically. The combined pill was first prescribed in FPA clinics in 1961 and within ten years was being used by over one million women. This highly reliable method brought a new sense of sexual freedom to men and women.

By 1970, FPA clinics were offering advice and treatment, without restriction. In 1974, FPA handed their network of over 1,000 clinics to the NHS when contraception became free for all. Family planning is still part of the health service.

== Leadership ==
The organisation's first administrator was Margaret Pyke OBE, who was appointed by the Association's chair, Gertrude Denman. When Denman died in 1954 Pyke took over as Chair, and was succeeded after her death in 1966 by Jean Medawar. Pyke's son, David Pyke, recalled his mother's involvement with the FPA in an interview with the historian, Brian Harrison, as part of the Suffrage Interviews project, titled Oral evidence on the suffragette and suffragist movements: the Brian Harrison interviews. The birth control activist, Nancy Raphael, honorary secretary of the FPA in the 1960s was also interviewed by Harrison as part of the project. Other women working alongside her included Lady Tewson, Helen Brook and Pamela Sheridan.

As of 2010, the President of FPA was Baroness Gould of Potternewton; Vice Presidents included Jacqui Lait, Joan Ruddock MP and Baroness Tonge, and the charity was supported by a number of patrons. Additionally the FPA was steered by a board of twelve trustees; the Chair was Dr Val Day and the Vice Chair was Paul Woodward. In January 2008, Julie Bentley became the Chief Executive, taking over from Anne Weyman OBE, who had previously led the organisation for 11 years.

Dr Audrey Simpson OBE became Chief Executive of FPA in October 2012, taking over from Julie Bentley who had led the organisation for five years.

== Activities ==
The FPA aimed to improve the public's knowledge of sexual health. The organisation ran training courses and projects for professionals, grandparents, parents, carers and young people, and provided an information and press service to communicate sexual health information more widely.

The FPA ran an enquiry service providing confidential information and advice on contraception; common sexually transmitted infections; pregnancy choices; abortion and planning a pregnancy. The enquiry service was made up of its helpline and Web Enquiry Service (Ask WES).

The FPA also provided clinic details of contraception, sexual health and genitourinary medicine (GUM) clinics and sexual assault referral centres. In Northern Ireland, where abortion is difficult to obtain, FPA offered an unplanned pregnancy counselling service.

The FPA was also funded by the Department of Health (England) to provide a wide range of booklets on individual methods of contraception, common sexually transmitted infections, pregnancy choices, abortion and planning a pregnancy. These were distributed freely across England to sexual health services and GPs.

Campaigning was a core part of the work of the FPA. It played a role in obtaining the provision of free contraception on the NHS across the UK and campaigned around abortion to preserve consumer rights and choices. In May 2008, FPA and other pro-choice groups prevented a reduction of the 24-week time limit for abortion, which was debated in the House of Commons. The organisation subsequently tried to modernise abortion laws throughout the UK.

In 2010, the FPA celebrated 80 years and rebranded with a new logo to reach more people with sexual health and sex and relationships information. During the same year it also founded an Achievers' Club to recognise people who have made significant contributions to improving the sexual health of the UK. "My contraception tool", an online tool to help people choose contraception, was launched by FPA and Brook. In October 2010, FPA also held the first all-Ireland conference on abortion for medical practitioners.

At the Charity Awards 2010, All about us, an FPA CD-ROM for people with learning disabilities, won the Disability category.

== Criticisms ==
Due to the emotive nature of some topics addressed by FPA – for example, abortion – the charity was criticised by a number of religious, political and pro-life groups. These groups generally protested on the grounds that all foetuses have a right to life; that sexual health education leads to promiscuity; that contraception is against the teachings of the Bible; and for other similar reasons. In the early years of the charity, objects were thrown at clinics and volunteers were threatened. Later, opponents frequently held protests outside the FPA Belfast office.
