= Susan Sutherland Isaacs =

British educational psychologist and psychoanalyst

Susan Sutherland Isaacs CBE
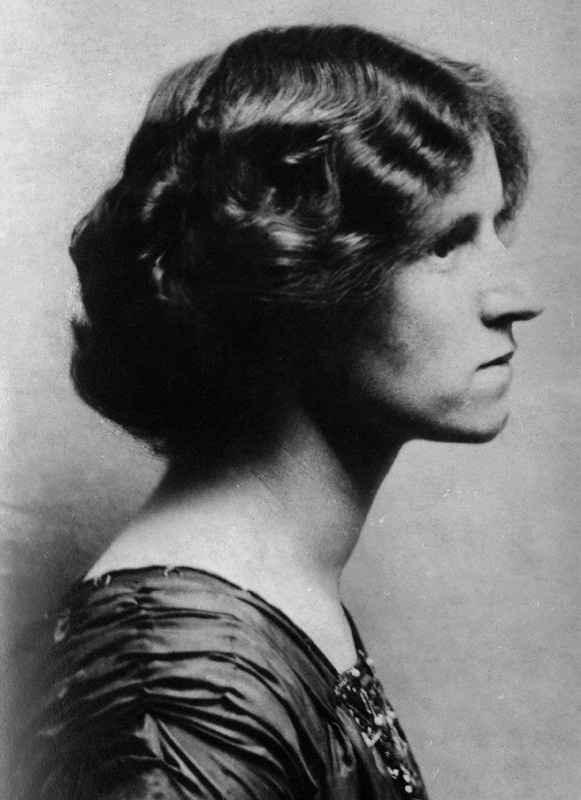
- Susan Isaacs, 1910s
- Born: Susan Sutherland Fairhurst; 24 May 1885; Turton, Lancashire, England
- Died: 12 October 1948 (aged 63); London, England
- Other names: Susan S. Brierley, Ursula Wise
- Scientific career
- Fields: Educational psychology

Susan Sutherland Isaacs, CBE (née Fairhurst; 24 May 1885 – 12 October 1948; also known as Susan S. Brierley or Ursula Wise) was an English educational psychologist and psychoanalyst. She published studies on the intellectual and social development of children and promoted the nursery school movement. For Isaacs, the best way for children to learn was by developing their independence. She believed that the most effective way to achieve this was through play, and that the role of adults and early educators was to guide children's play.

== Early life and education ==
Isaacs was born in 1885 in Turton, Lancashire, the daughter of William Fairhurst, a journalist and Methodist lay preacher, and his wife, Miriam Sutherland. Her mother died when she was six years old. Shortly afterwards she became alienated from her father after he married the nurse who had attended her mother during her illness. Aged 15, she was removed from Bolton Secondary School by her father because she had converted to atheistic socialism; her father refused to speak to her for 2 years. She stayed at home with her stepmother until she was 22. She was first apprenticed to a photographer and then she began her teaching career as a governess for an English family.

In 1907, Isaacs enrolled to train as a teacher of young children (5 to 7-year-olds) at the University of Manchester. Isaacs then transferred to a degree course and graduated in 1912 with a first class degree in Philosophy. She was awarded a scholarship at the Psychological Laboratory in Newnham College, Cambridge and gained a master's degree in 1913.

== Career ==
Isaacs also trained and practised as a psychoanalyst after analysis by the psychoanalyst John Carl Flugel (1884–1955). She became an associate member of the newly formed British Psychoanalytical Society in 1921, becoming a full member in 1923. She began her own practice that same year. She later underwent brief analysis with Otto Rank and in 1927 she submitted herself to further analysis with Joan Riviere, to get personal experience and understanding of Melanie Klein's new ideas on infancy. Isaacs also helped popularise the works of Klein, as well as the theories of Jean Piaget and Sigmund Freud. She was initially enthusiastic for Jean Piaget's theories on the intellectual development of young children, though she later criticised his schemas for stages of cognitive development, which were not based on the observation of the child in their natural environment, unlike her own observations at Malting House School.

Between 1924 and 1927, she was the head of Malting House School in Cambridge, which is an experimental school founded by Geoffrey Pyke. The school fostered the individual development of children. Children were given greater freedom and were supported rather than punished. The teachers were seen as observers of the children who were seen as research workers. Her work had a great influence on early education and made play a central part of a child's education. Isaacs strongly believed that play was the child's work.

Between 1929 and 1940, she was an 'agony aunt' under the pseudonym of Ursula Wise, replying to readers' problems in several child care journals, notably The Nursery World and Home and School.

In 1933, she became the first Head of the Child Development Department at the Institute of Education, University of London, where she established an advanced course in child development for teachers of young children. Her department had a great influence on the teaching profession and encouraged the profession to consider psychodynamic theory with developmental psychology.

== Approach ==
Isaacs argued that it is important to develop children's skills to think clearly and exercise independent judgement. Developing a child's independence is beneficial to their development as an individual. She saw parents as the primary educators, and institutionalised care for children under the age of seven as potentially damaging. Children learned best through their own play. "For Isaacs, play involves a perpetual form of experiment ... 'at any moment, a new line of inquiry or argument might flash out, a new step in understanding be taken'".

Thus play should be viewed as children's work, and social interaction is an important part of play and learning. The emotional needs of children are also very important and symbolic and fantasy play could be a release for a child's feelings. "What imaginative play does, in the first place is to create practical situations which may often then be pursued for their own sake, and this leads on to actual discovery or to verbal judgment and reasoning". The role of the adults, then, is to guide children's play, but on the whole they should have freedom to explore. Her book Intellectual Growth in Young Children explains her perspective.

However, Isaacs was not in favour of uncontrolled self-expression: rather, she stressed the importance in child development of the internalisation of what she called the “good-strict” parent – one able to control the child's instincts, and prevent their unrestrained force from harming self or other. She also was one of the first to review and challenge Jean Piaget's stages of child development.

During the controversial discussions of the British Psychoanalytical Society, Isaacs presented an influential position paper of 1943 setting out the Kleinian view of phantasy . There she maintained that “Unconscious phantasies exert a continuous influence throughout life, both in normal and neurotic people”, adding that in the analytic situation “the patient's relation to his analyst is almost entirely one of unconscious phantasy”. Her statement has however been criticised as a kind of 'pan-instinctualism', over-simplifying the full range and scope of phantasy to a purely instinctual aim".

== Marriages ==
Isaacs embarked upon a series of lectures in infant school education at Darlington Training College; in logic at Manchester University; and psychology at London University. In 1914, she married William Broadhurst Brierley, a botany lecturer. A year later they moved to London where she became tutor to the Workers' Educational Association (WEA) and, from 1916, lectured in psychology at the University of London. In 1922, she divorced Brierley and married Nathan Isaacs (1895–1966), a metals trader who collaborated with his wife in her later work.

== Cancer and death ==
Isaacs developed cancer in 1935 and struggled with ill health for the rest of her life. She was still able to go on a tour of Australia and New Zealand in 1937; and after moving to Cambridge in 1939, she conducted the Cambridge Evacuation Survey which studied the effect of evacuation on children. She was awarded the CBE in 1948.

She died from cancer on 12 October 1948, aged 63. There are several portraits of her in the National Portrait Gallery in London.

== Publications ==
- Introduction to Psychology, Methuen Press, (London, 1921)
- Nursery Years, Routledge, (London, 1929).
- The biological interests of young children, (1929)
- The Intellectual Growth of Young Children, Routledge and Kegan Paul, (London, 1930)
- Behaviour of Young Children, Routledge & Sons (London, 1930)
- The psychological aspects of child development, Evans with the University of London, Institute of Education, (London [1930]) (First published as Section II of the 1935 volume of the Year Book of Education).
- The children we teach: seven to eleven years, University of London, Institute of Education, (London, 1932)
- The Social Development of Young Children: A Study of Beginnings, Routledge and Kegan Paul, (London, 1933).
- Child Guidance. Suggestions for a clinic playroom, Child Guidance Council (London, 1936)
- The Cambridge Evacuation Survey. A wartime study in social welfare and education. Edited by Susan Isaacs with the co-operation of Sibyl Clement Brown & Robert H. Thouless. Written by Georgina Bathurst, Sibyl Clement Brown [and others], etc., Methuen Press (London, 1941).
- Childhood & After. Some essays and clinical studies, Routledge & Kegan Paul (London, 1948).
- Troubles of children and parents, Methuen Press, (London, 1948)
- "The Nature and Function of Phantasy", in Joan Riviere ed., Developments in Psycho-Analysis Hogarth Press (London 1952)

== Personal papers ==
Collections of Isaacs personal papers can be found in the Archives of the Institute of Education, University of London, the Archives of the British Psychoanalytical Society and the British and Foreign School Society (BFSS) Archive Centre.

== See also ==
- Psychoanalysis
- Psychodynamics
- Early childhood education
- Parenting
- Pedagogy
