= Collins Library =

Publishing imprint

The Collins Library is an imprint of McSweeney's Books that publishes unusual out-of-print books. The imprint is named for its editor, Paul Collins.

== Publications ==
1. English as She Is Spoke, by José da Fonseca and Pedro Carolino (1855) (McSweeney's, 2002) ISBN 0-9719047-4-X
2. To Ruhleben—And Back, by Geoffrey Pike (1916) (McSweeney's, 2003) ISBN 0-9719047-8-2
3. Lady into Fox, by David Garnett (1922) (McSweeney's, 2004) ISBN 1-932416-05-6
4. The Riddle of the Traveling Skull, by Harry Stephen Keeler (1934) (McSweeney's, 2005) ISBN 1-932416-26-9
5. The Lunatic at Large, by J. Storer Clouston (1899) (McSweeney's, 2007) ISBN 1-932416-70-6
6. Curious Men, by Frank Buckland (McSweeney's, 2008) ISBN 1-934781-20-7
7. The Rector and the Rogue, by W.A. Swanberg (1969) (McSweeney's, 2011) ISBN 1-936365-23-5
