= McSweeney's =

American publishing house

- Parent company: McSweeney's Literary Arts Fund
- Status: Active
- Founded: 1998; 28 years ago
- Founder: Dave Eggers
- Country of origin: United States
- Headquarters location: San Francisco
- Distribution: Baker & Taylor Publisher Services
- Publication types: Books, magazines
- Official website: mcsweeneys.net

Cover of issue 9 of Timothy McSweeney's Quarterly Concern, published in 2002

McSweeney's Publishing is an American nonprofit publishing house founded by Dave Eggers in 1998 and headquartered in San Francisco. The executive director is Amanda Uhle.

McSweeney's first publication was the literary journal Timothy McSweeney's Quarterly Concern in 1998. Since then, the company has published novels, books of poetry, and other periodicals.

== Company history ==
McSweeney's distributor was Publishers Group West (PGW) from 2002 until the end of 2006, when its parent company, Advanced Marketing Services, filed for bankruptcy. At the time of the filing, PGW owed McSweeney's about $600,000. To recover the funds, McSweeney's accepted a deal from the publishing group and distributor, Perseus Books Group, that offered payment of 70 cents on the dollar owed by PGW. In June 2007, McSweeney's held a successful sale and eBay auction to help make up the difference.

Since 2013, McSweeney's archives have been held in the Harry Ransom Center at the University of Texas. They include material from the company's founding and early history.

From 2013 to 2022, Brian Christian served as Director of Technology at McSweeney's, overseeing the development of the company's digital infrastructure and the successful launch of a new version of McSweeney's Internet Tendency in 2016 and its first audio issue, in collaboration with Radiotopia, in 2021.

In October 2014, Dave Eggers announced that McSweeney's would become a nonprofit publishing house and asked readers for donations for several projects. Eggers cited declining sales and more fundraising opportunities as the reasons for McSweeney's long-discussed change.

In 2015, McSweeney's expanded into brand copywriting, working in partnership with marketers at Converse, Warby Parker, and Airbnb.

In 2019, McSweeney's began publishing Illustoria magazine, founded by Joanne Meiyi Chan.

=== Company name ===
In 2004, Eggers said that when he was a child his family received letters from someone named Timothy McSweeney, who claimed to be a relative of his mother. The letters arrived as a result of the coincidence that his grandfather, who delivered Timothy at birth, and the family who adopted Timothy had the same last name: McSweeney.

== Publications ==
In addition to a book list of approximately ten titles a year, McSweeney's publishes the quarterly literary journal Timothy McSweeney's Quarterly Concern, the daily-updated humor site McSweeney's Internet Tendency, and Illustoria, an art and storytelling magazine for children aged 6 to 11. McSweeney's also published the bimonthly magazine The Believer, the quarterly food journal Lucky Peach, and the sports journal Grantland Quarterly, in association with sports and pop culture website Grantland.

McSweeney's occasionally runs additional imprints, including the children's book department McSweeney's McMullens, McSweeney's Poetry Series, and the Collins Library, which reprints unusual titles.

The Organist, a podcast produced by the editors of The Believer and KCRW, launched in 2012.

A quarterly DVD magazine, Wholphin, ran from 2005 to 2012.

=== Authors ===
Emerging writers involved with McSweeney's include Rebecca Curtis, Paul Legault, Philipp Meyer, and Wells Tower. Other contributors include Chimamanda Ngozi Adichie, Michael Chabon, Stephen King, David Foster Wallace, George Saunders, Michael Ian Black, Nick Hornby, Joyce Carol Oates, and Hilton Als.

McSweeney's has also published the work of musicians, critics and artists including David Byrne and Beck. The band One Ring Zero performed at early McSweeney's events in New York and solicited lyric-writing assistance from McSweeney's contributors for their 2004 album, As Smart As We Are.

McSweeney's was the subject of the They Might Be Giants song "The Ballad of Timothy McSweeney."

== Non-McSweeney's collections ==
These titles are compilations of McSweeney's works either from print or online sources. The publisher of the works is listed at the end.

- McSweeney's Mammoth Treasury of Thrilling Tales by Michael Chabon (2003, Vintage)
- Created in Darkness by Troubled Americans by Dave Eggers (2004, Knopf)
- McSweeney's Enchanted Chamber of Astonishing Stories by Michael Chabon (2004, Vintage)
- Created in Darkness by Troubled Americans by Dave Eggers (2005, Vintage)
- The McSweeney's Joke Book of Book Jokes (2008, Vintage)
- Mountain Man Dance Moves: The McSweeney's Book of Lists (2006, Vintage)
- Greetings from the Ocean's Sweaty Face: 100 McSweeney's Postcards (2009, Chronicle)

== Reception ==
Fast Company ranked McSweeney's #7 on their list of the most innovative media companies in the US in 2012. McSweeney's literary journal is a three-time winner of the National Magazine Award for Fiction, and an 8-time finalist. In 2001, the New York Times was less flattering when it noted "The McSweeneyites may be the current emperors of cool, but they're starting to need some new clothes."

In 2019, Vida hailed Timothy McSweeney's Quarterly Concern as the magazine that publishes the highest percentage of women and trans writers (71%) compared to peer publications.

In 2021, Axios reported that readership tripled across McSweeney's web and print publications.

== 826 Valencia publications ==
These titles are releases of/by non-profit organization 826 Valencia, published by McSweeney's/826.

- 826 Quarterly Vol. 1 Students in Conjunction With 826 Valencia 2003/05/01
- 826 Quarterly Vol. 2 Students in Conjunction With 826 Valencia 2003/09/01
- 826 Quarterly Vol. 3 Students in Conjunction With 826 Valencia 2004/09/01
- 826 Quarterly Vol. 4 Students in Conjunction With 826 Valencia 2005/05/01
- 826 Quarterly Vol. 5 Students in Conjunction With 826 Valencia 2005/10/28
- 826 Quarterly Vol. 6 Students in Conjunction With 826 Valencia 2006/10/01
- 826 Quarterly Vol. 7 Students in Conjunction With 826 Valencia 2007/10/28
- 826 Quarterly Vol. 8 Students in Conjunction With 826 Valencia 2007/11/28
- 826nyc Review: Issue One Students in Conjunction With 826 Valencia / Seeley, Scott / Potts, Sam 2005/08/01
- 826nyc Review: Issue Two Students in Conjunction With 826 Valencia / Seeley, Scott / Potts, Sam 2006/06/01
- 826nyc Review: Issue Three Students in Conjunction With 826 Valencia / Seeley, Scott / Potts, Sam 2008/09/28
- 826NYC Art Show: A Limited Edition Catalog of 23 Original Pieces by Prominent Contemporary Artists 826NYC (EDT) 2007/08/28

== McSweeney's Internet Tendency ==
McSweeney's website has published short humor daily or multiple times daily since 1998. Published compilations of its short humor include The Best of McSweeney's Internet Tendency (2014) and Keep Scrolling Till You Feel Something: 21 Years of Humor from McSweeney's Internet Tendency (2019). The site is edited by Chris Monks and assistant edited by Lucy Huber.

== See also ==
- "It's Decorative Gourd Season, Motherfuckers" – An essay published by McSweeney's
