= Second Battle of Passchendaele =

Part of the Third Battle of Ypres in the First World War

- Part of the Third Battle of Ypres in the First World War
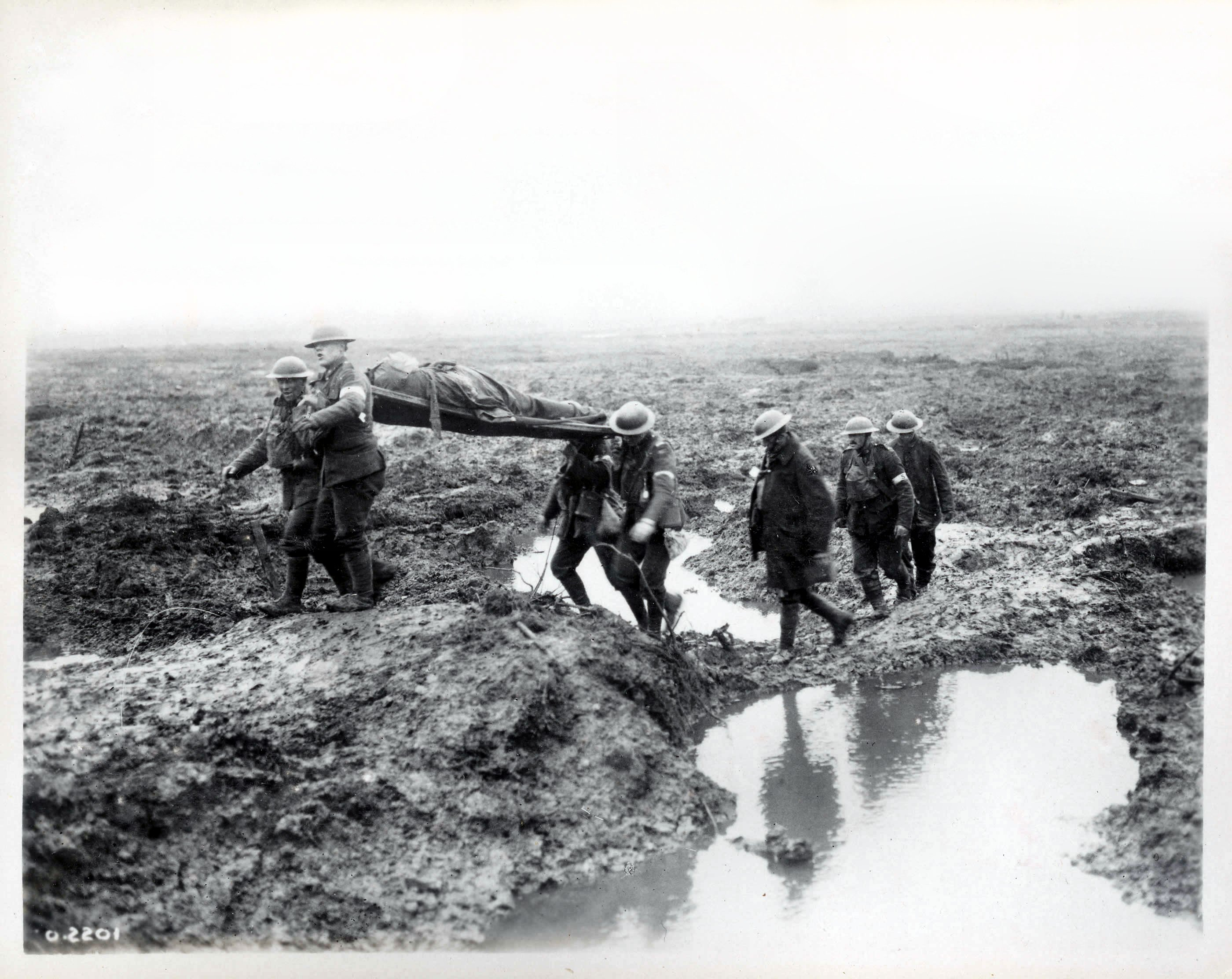
- Canadian troops carry a wounded man to the aid post.
Date	26 October – 10 November 1917
Location	Passchendaele (Passendale), Belgium 50°54′1″N 3°1′16″E
Result	Allied victory

Belligerents
British Empire; Australia; Canada; United Kingdom; France; Belgium	German Empire

Commanders and leaders
Herbert Plumer; Hubert Gough; Arthur Currie; François Anthoine; Louis Ruquoy	Friedrich Sixt von Armin

Strength
4 Canadian divisions; 6 British divisions; 1 Australian division; 2 French divisions; 1 Belgian division	6 divisions

Casualties and losses
15,654 Canadian; Total: c. 35,654	21–31 October: 20,500; 1–10 November: 9,500
- German casualties from 11 November – 31 December: 15,000

The Second Battle of Passchendaele was the culminating attack during the Third Battle of Ypres of the First World War. The battle took place in the Ypres Salient area of the Western Front, in and around the Belgian village of Passchendaele, between 26 October and 10 November 1917. The Canadian Corps relieved the exhausted II Anzac Corps, continuing the advance started with the First Battle of Passchendaele and ultimately capturing the village. Beyond gaining favourable observation positions, the battle was intended to gain drier winter positions on higher ground.

The assault position was directly south of the boundary between the British Fifth and Second Armies. The Canadian Corps was to attack with support of formations from the British Fifth Army to the north and the I Anzac Corps and X Corps to the south. The offensive was executed in a series of attacks with limited objectives, delivered at intervals of three or more days. The dates of the phases were tentatively given as 26 October, 30 October and 6 November with a final smaller action on 10 November. To permit time for divisional reliefs, there was a seven-day pause planned between the second and third stages, during which the Second Army took over the XVIII Corps area, north of the Canadian Corps, from the Fifth Army with the II Corps on 2 November, to assure unity of command over the central part of the attack front.

The attacks captured the German-held high ground along the Passchendaele–Westrozebeke ridge but the campaign ended just short of Westrozebeke. The victory of the Austro-German forces against the Italian Army at the Battle of Caporetto and the forthcoming Battle of Cambrai forced the British into a parallel diversion of resources from the Ypres Salient. II Corps asked for a delay until 19 November to move artillery forward; five British divisions were transferred to Italy and four British divisions on the coast were sent to take over French positions south of the Somme. On 20 November, Haig ended the offensive, except for local attacks in December for better defensive positions.

== Background ==
In July 1917, Field Marshal Douglas Haig began the Third Battle of Ypres, to break down the resistance of the German 4th Army (General Friedrich Sixt von Armin) and advance out of the Ypres Salient. The Battle of Messines in June and the Battle of Pilckem Ridge which began on 31 July had captured ground but left the Germans in possession of the most important positions on the Gheluvelt Plateau. Torrential rain in August interrupted the tempo of the British advance and at the Battle of Langemarck the Germans lost ground in the north but again held most of the ground on the Plateau. In view of the failure of the Fifth Army to make much headway in August, Haig decided to transfer more offensive weight towards the south-east, along the southern half of Passchendaele Ridge. The main command was switched from the Fifth Army (General Hubert Gough) to the Second Army (General Herbert Plumer) on the southern flank. Rather than continue with optimistic, semi-open warfare tactics, Plumer planned a series of limited attacks, taking advantage of recent experience. Less ambitious infantry advances at the Battle of Menin Road, Battle of Polygon Wood, Battle of Broodseinde and Battle of Gravenstafel Ridge produced a 4,000 yd (2.3 mi; 3.7 km) advance in two weeks. The 4th Army suffered many casualties, especially at Broodseinde and the German command began preparations for a general withdrawal as a precaution.

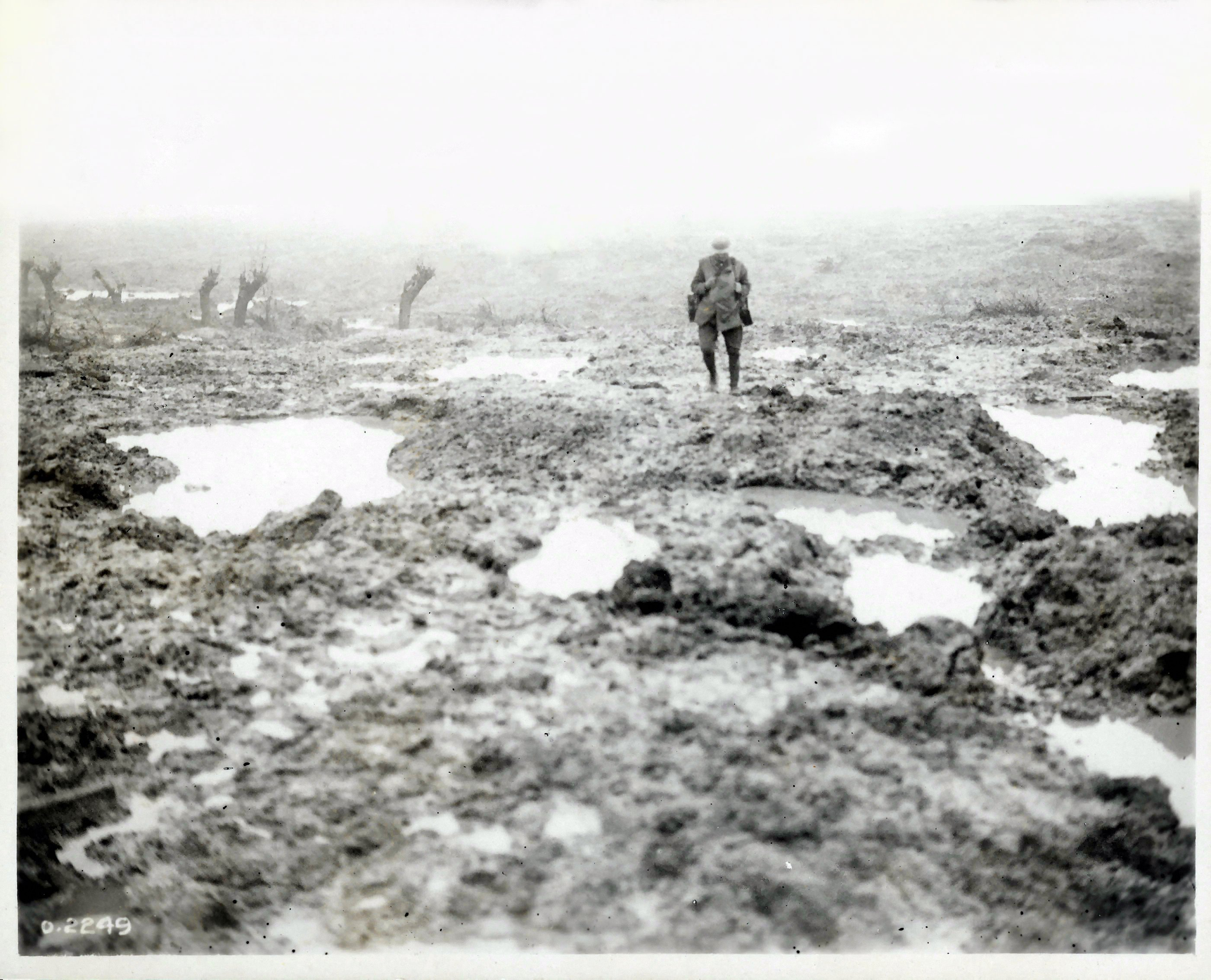
The mud slowed all troop movement

In the low ground west of the Passchendaele Ridge, three months of constant shelling had blocked the watercourses that normally provided drainage. When rain began falling on the night of 4 October—which continued intermittently for the next three days—the battlefield once again became a quagmire, making movement extremely difficult. Gough and Plumer told Haig that they favoured ending the campaign on account of the change in the weather and general state of the battlefield but the decision was made to continue the offensive for winter positions on higher ground. (Note: The meeting is described in the British official history volume 1917 part II (1948) but in 1996, Prior and Wilson questioned the accuracy of the account, because no contemporary record of such a meeting had been found and it was not recorded in Haig's diary.) The Battle of Poelcappelle (9 October) and First Battle of Passchendaele (12 October) were costly for both sides and failed to achieve any appreciable advance opposite Passchendaele, although they did provide a slightly better starting line for another attack. The four divisions of the Canadian Corps were transferred from the Lens sector to the Ypres Salient to capture Passchendaele. The Canadian Corps relieved the II Anzac Corps on 18 October, along the valley between Gravenstafel Ridge and the high ground at Passchendaele and began planning the offensive. It was virtually the same front as had been occupied by the 1st Canadian Division back in April 1915.

== Prelude ==
=== Plans and preparations ===
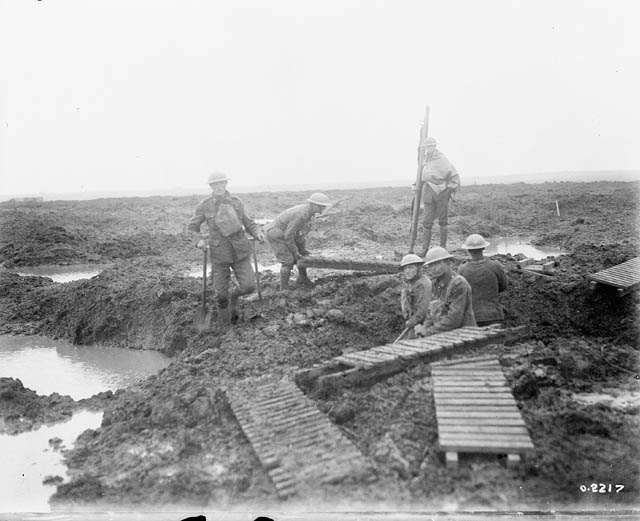
Canadian pioneers laying trench mats over mud to ease movement

The Canadian Corps operation was to be executed in a series of three attacks, each with limited objectives, delivered at intervals of three or more days. As the Canadian Corps position was directly south of the boundary between British Fifth and Second armies, the Fifth Army would mount subsidiary operations on the left flank of the Canadian Corps, while the I Anzac Corps would advance to protect the right flank and X Corps attack Gheluvelt to improve the local tactical position and as a diversion from the main attack in the north. The Canadian Corps commander, Lieutenant-General Arthur Currie, submitted his provisional operational plan on 16 October and recommended the attack not be executed until 29 October, to move sufficient artillery forward. Haig was anxious to avoid delay, particularly given that he wished to assist the French attack on Malmaison, which was due to start on 23 October. Currie and Plumer, re-examined the situation and finally set the attack for 26 October. The dates for the subsequent phases were tentatively given as 30 October and 6 November.

Extensive preparations were needed before any advance could be made. A number of problems were found with the artillery and positions transferred from the Australians. Of the nominal 250 heavy howitzers, only 227 could be found and 89 were out of action. Of the 306 18-pounder field guns, fewer than half were in action. (Note: A gun was "in action" when it had 200 rounds at hand and could open fire on SOS lines (a planned defensive area bombardment) if the infantry was suddenly attacked.) Lack of mobility caused by the mud left the Australian artillery badly bunched in two main clusters, making easy targets for German gunners. The Australians could not send damaged guns back for repair, because the Provost Marshal had ordered guns off the roads, for fear of blocking traffic. The welcome arrival of the Canadian divisional artillery placed another two-hundred-and-ten 18-pounder field guns, 190 howitzers and 26 heavy guns at the disposal of the Canadian Corps.

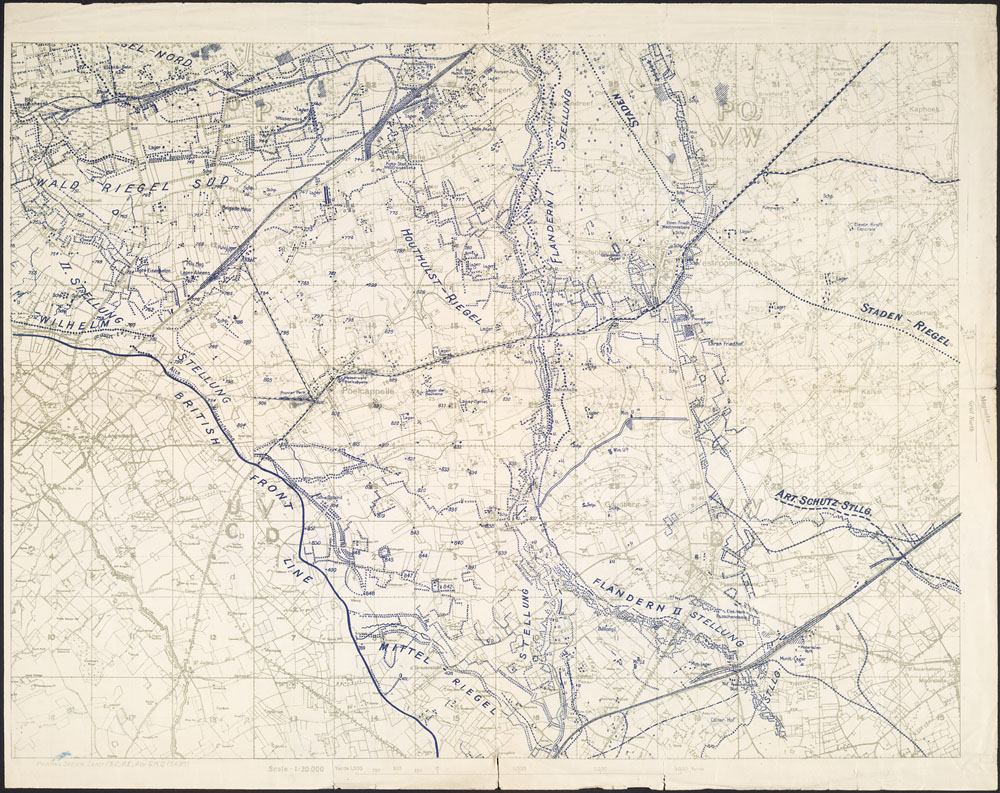
Detailed map of the German trench system

As early as 17 October, assaulting units were given details about the German defences in their sectors, to begin planning. Intelligence officers and artillery observers worked jointly in observation posts, recording new German fortifications as well as those that had escaped notice, permitting the artillery to bombard them before the offensive. To improve the transport of artillery and supplies, an extensive program of road building was started. Ten field companies, seven Royal Engineer tunnelling companies, four army troop companies and nine infantry battalions were put to work repairing or extending plank roads. From the middle of October until the end of the offensive, a total of 2 mi (3.2 km) of double plank road and more than 4,000 yd (2.3 mi; 3.7 km) of heavy tram line were laid in the Canadian Corps area. Brigadier General Edward Morrison, commander of the artillery, also secured permission to use the roads to send guns back for repair.

Moving troops to the front ahead of the attack was still extremely difficult, as the only means of approaching the front line were narrow boardwalks made of planks, which wound between the shell-holes. Slipping off duckboards could often be deadly with unfortunate soldiers frequently drowning in mud under the weight of their equipment.

A party of men passing up to the front line found a man bogged to above the knees. The united efforts of four of them with rifles under his armpits made not the slightest impression, and to dig, even if shovels had been available, was impossible for there was no foothold. Duty compelled them to move on up to the line, and when two days later they passed down that way the wretched man was still there; but only his head was visible and he was raving mad.

Because of the exhausting nature of the journey, the leading assault units entered the support line four days before the battle to ensure that the soldiers would be as fresh as possible for the attack.

=== Action of 22 October ===
Weather 13 October – 10 November 1917
Date	Rain mm	°F	
13	10.7	52	cloud
14	0.0	52	cloud
15	0.0	52	fog
16	0.1	54	clear
17	7.1	56	clear
18	0.0	58	—
19	2.9	48	cloud
20	2.9	48	cloud
21	1.3	54	—
22	3.2	56	dull
23	4.0	50	—
24	7.7	48	cloud
25	4.5	50	cloud
26	7.8	48	dull
27	0.0	49	cloud
28	1.3	41	cloud
29	0.0	47	cloud
30	2.3	44	clear
31	0.0	54	clear
1	0.2	51	dull
2	0.7	56	dull
3	0.0	52	dull
4	0.0	47	dull
5	0.0	49	fog
6	1.0	52	dull
7	1.4	48	dull
8	2.6	44	cloud
9	1.6	50	cloud
10	13.4	46	—

On 22 October the British 18th (Eastern) Division of XVIII Corps attacked the east end of Poelcappelle. XIV Corps on the left attacked with the 34th Division between the Watervlietbeek and Broenbeek streams and the 35th Division northwards into Houthulst Forest, supported by a regiment of the 1st Division of the French First Army on the left. Poelcappelle was captured but the attack at the junction between the 34th and 35th divisions was repulsed. German counterattacks also pushed back the 35th Division in the centre as the French regiment was capturing all its objectives. Attacking on ground cut up by bombardments, soaked by rain and churned into deep mud, the British had struggled to advance in places and could not move quickly to outflank pillboxes. Troops of the 35th Division reached the edge of Houthulst Forest but were repulsed in several places. German counterattacks after 22 October were costly failures for the same reasons. The 4th Army was prevented from transferring troops away from the Fifth Army or from concentrating its artillery on the Canadians as they prepared to attack Passchendaele Ridge.

=== Opposing forces ===
The Canadian Corps was the principal attacking formation. Immediately to the north, the Canadians were supported by XVIII Corps and after an army boundary shift, II Corps of the Second Army. On the northern flank of the offensive, the advance was supported by diversionary attacks by the British XIV Corps and the 1st and 133rd Divisions of the French First Army. To the south, the right flank of the Canadian advance was supported by I Anzac Corps and on the southern flank of the offensive, X Corps supported the operation with a diversionary attack on Gheluvelt, to secure Tower Hamlets ridge, east of the Bassevillebeek.

Passchendaele Ridge and the area surrounding the village was defended by Gruppe Ypern organized under Guard Corps commander General der Kavallerie Alfred Graf zu Dohna-Schlobitten. Defending German units changed throughout the battle and at various times, consisted of the 4th, 7th, 11th, 11th Bavarian, 27th, 39th, 44th Reserve, 185th, 199th, 238th and 239th Divisions.

== Battle ==
=== First stage ===
Constant shelling had blocked the Ravebeek stream, creating an impassable swamp directly between the boundary of the 3rd Canadian and the 4th Canadian Divisions, necessitating a two-pronged attack. The 3rd Canadian Division was assigned the wider advance on the left, which included the sharply rising ground of the Bellevue spur. In the more restricted ground south of the Ravebeek stream, the 4th Canadian Division would occupy advanced positions in no man's land before the start of the offensive and take Decline Copse, which straddled the Ypres–Roulers railway. Currie planned the attack with extensive depth in resources. The remaining units of the 8th, 9th and 10th Canadian Infantry Brigades were placed in support, while the 7th, 11th and 12th Canadian Infantry Brigades were held in divisional and corps reserve. The 1st and 2nd Canadian Divisions were in army reserve.

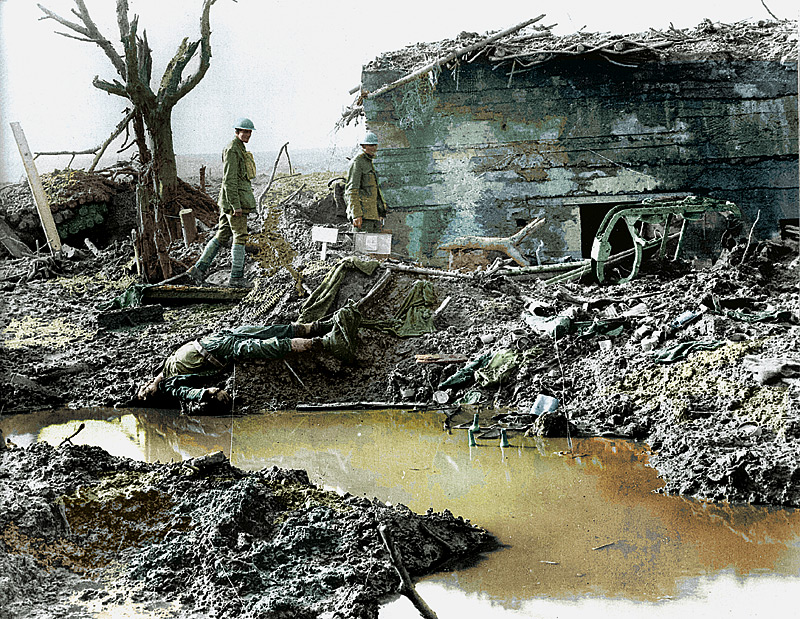
The German defensive strategy utilized mutually-supporting steel-reinforced cement fortifications

The assault began at 5:40 a.m. on the morning of 26 October. The troops were preceded by a rolling barrage, edging forward in lifts of 50 yd (46 m) every four minutes, permitting the infantry to keep up while negotiating the mud. On the left flank, the 8th Canadian Infantry Brigade captured Wolf Copse and secured its objective line but was ultimately forced to drop a defensive flank 300 yd (270 m) back to link up with the 63rd (Royal Naval) Division, the flanking division of the Fifth Army. In the centre, the 9th Canadian Infantry Brigade found the German barbed wire to be well cut by the preliminary artillery bombardment and within an hour captured the Bellevue pillboxes.

The Germans brought down heavy artillery fire on their abandoned positions and by 9:00 a.m. the brigade's right flank had retreated towards its start line. On the far right, the 10th Canadian Infantry Brigade captured all its objectives as did the 1st Australian Division on its southern flank. As the day wore on, the positions in Decline Copse, a Canadian–Australian objective on the southern flank of the Canadian Corps were gradually abandoned due to German counterattacks and misunderstandings between the Canadian and Australian units.

The 9th Canadian Infantry Brigade's right flank had consolidated its position and by the morning on 27 October, had outposts only 300 yd (270 m) short of its first objective. The 10th Canadian Infantry Brigade captured Decline Copse again on the night of 27 October. The German 238th Division attacked and briefly recaptured the copse the following night, only to be quickly expelled by a Canadian counterattack. When the first stage ended on 28 October, the Canadian Corps had suffered 2,481 casualties. Although the first stage was not completely successful, the operation had placed the Canadians on higher ground and in a good tactical position for the second stage.

North of the Canadians, the supporting attack by XVIII Corps involved the 188th Brigade, 63rd (Royal Naval) Division and a brigade of the 58th (2/1st London) Division. The 188th Brigade quickly captured Varlet Farm and Banff House. The centre of the attack was held up on the road between Bray Farm and the village of Wallemolen and dug-in near Source Trench. As dark fell, Banff House was abandoned and the line reformed at Berks House, leaving Banff House and Source Trench the only part of the first objective not captured. Further north, the 58th Division brigade took three pillboxes at Cameron House, before being stopped at Spider crossroads by German machine-gun fire and exhaustion due to the muddy conditions. From 7:00 a.m. to 10:00 a.m. German counterattacks from the north cut off the foremost troops and then advanced from a sunken road between Papa Farm and Whitechapel, which pushed the rest of the brigade back to the start line, where the Germans were also caught in the mud and pushed back by British reinforcements.

On the northern flank of the Fifth Army, XIV Corps conducted diversions employing one brigade each from the 57th (2nd West Lancashire) and the 50th (Northumbrian) divisions. The 57th Division brigade advanced into a marsh, which bogged the attack close to the start line but its troops established advanced posts at Rubens and Memlings Farms 200–350 yd (180–320 m) forward. The right battalion of the 149th Brigade, 50th Division, got to within 80 yd (73 m) of the objective, before fire from German machine-guns and snipers forced a withdrawal to the start line. Further north up to the Ypres–Staden railway, a battalion reached Hill 23, Aden House and Tourenne Crossing but was back at the start line by 4:15 p.m.. The left flank battalion advanced 2,000 yd (1.1 mi; 1.8 km) before machine-gun fire forced it back to the start line. All of the Fifth Army attacks encountered deep mud, which slowed progress to a crawl, caused the barrage to be lost and clogged weapons, in the face of German counterattacks, which forced most attacks back to their start lines.

To the south of the Canadian Corps, in the X Corps area, two brigades of the British 5th and one of the 7th Division conducted diversionary attacks. The 7th Division commander only acquiesced in the attack because it was intended to pin German reserves and stop them moving north against the main attack. (Note: The 7th Division had 144 18-pounder field guns, 48 4.5-inch howitzers, 32 medium and 20 heavy howitzers in support.) The 7th Division attacked Gheluvelt with the 20th and 91st Brigades, while the 5th Division attacked Polderhoek and the Scherriabeek valley, immediately to the north, with the 13th Brigade. The right flank battalion of the 91st Brigade advanced rapidly, protected by a rise which hid them from most of the German machine-gunners nearer to the Menin road. A fortified mound near Hamp Farm was overrun after hand-to-hand fighting. The other two battalions had to advance along the forward slope of the spur running south-east from Tower Hamlets ridge. The area was dominated by machine-guns in a group of pillboxes at Lewis House; the centre battalion could not keep pace with the barrage and it was stopped well short of the pillboxes. Troops began to converge on the area near Lewis House, which caused crowding and gaps in the line. An attempt to outflank the pillboxes failed and the brigade fell back to its assembly positions.

The 20th Brigade attacked astride the Menin Road, the right battalion crossing marshy ground that deepened into waist-high mud towards the Kroomebeek creek. Some troops tried to get round the right flank but machine-gun fire from Lewis House and crossfire from the pillboxes on the Menin road and Swagger Farm ended the attempt. Other parties found the condition of the ground so poor that they moved left, towards the Menin road, only to be pinned down by fire from the pillboxes there but the advance captured one pillbox and advanced to within 100 yd (91 m) of Gheluvelt Church at the west end of the village. The two battalions advancing north of the Menin road managed to keep up with the barrage and reached its junction with the railway tracks just outside Gheluvelt. The battalions bunched and entered Gheluvelt at the same time; some of the troops cleared several pillboxes along Johnson Trench and one party tried to rush Gheluvelt Château. At 10:00 a.m., the Germans counterattacked and the British retreated, many of their weapons being jammed with mud. The remaining troops formed a defensive flank south of the road towards Tower Hamlets and reoccupied the original front line. Once the retreat was complete, British artillery fired a protective barrage and no further German counterattack developed.

The 13th Brigade, 5th Division, attacked with three battalions through the Scherriabeek valley, which were raked by fire from Gheluvelt and found the valley to be impassable. Polderhoek Château was captured but then relinquished because many weapons were clogged by mud and the position made an awkward salient. The Germans reoccupied the château, swept the area to the west with massed machine-gun fire and counterattacked, which pushed the brigade back to the start line. The attacks on the flanks of the Canadian Corps had not gone well. To the south, the X Corps diversion resulted in 3,321 casualties, 2,201 in the 7th Division. In the Fifth Army to the north, XVIII Corps suffered 2,310 casualties, the 63rd Division losing approximately 2,000 casualties in the 188th Brigade and XIV Corps 3,092 casualties. Next day, the 63rd Division retook Banff House and repulsed a German counterattack. Two reserve battalions reinforced the 4th Canadian Division and reached the previous day's objective by 10:00 a.m. Next day patrols from the 3rd Canadian Division scouted Meetchele and Furst Farms. On 29 October, the 1st Australian Division established a post in Decoy Wood.

==== Franco-Belgian operations ====
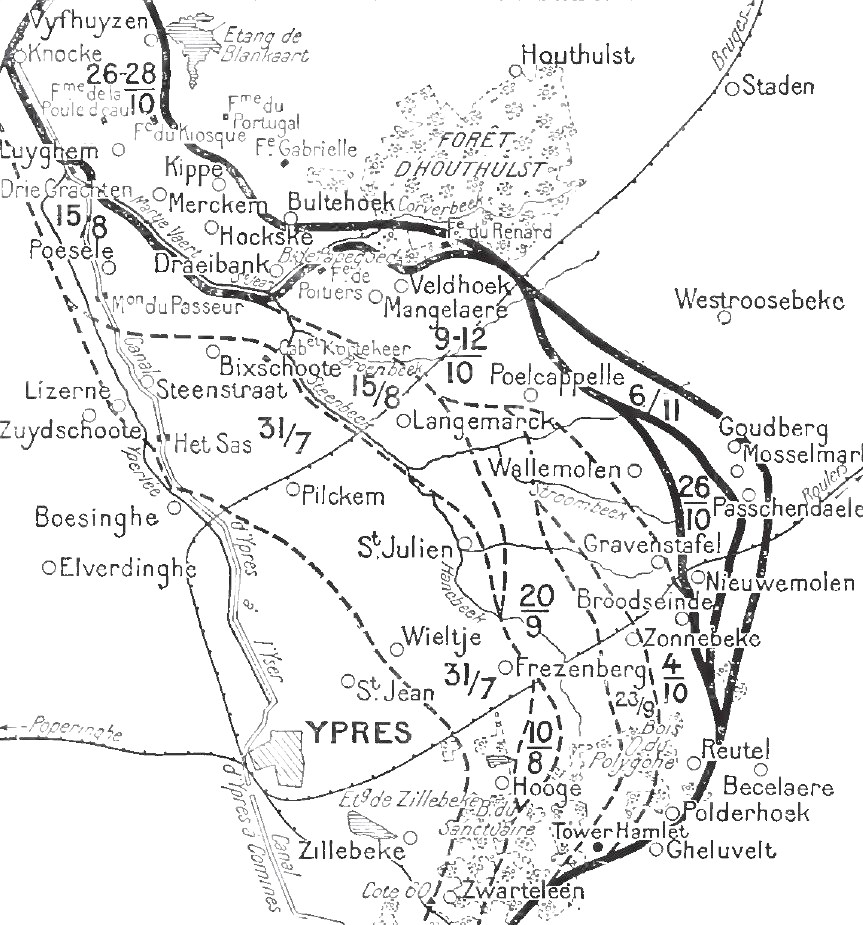
Allied advances, 22 October – 6 November

The French First Army, with the 1st and 133rd divisions and a division of the Belgian Army planned to occupy the Merckem peninsula in stages, with an attack beginning on the south-east of the peninsula and extending to the north. On 26 October, after an intense bombardment, French troops crossed the lower Steenbeek and advanced into Papegoed (butterfly) Wood, Lucannes Farm and the pillboxes between. The French then forced the Germans from the remaining pillboxes to the west of the woods and forded the Corverbeek, which in places was shoulder-high, soon capturing the pillboxes opposite and occupying the Steenstraate–Dixmude road round Langewaede. In the evening, the Germans rushed the 8th Bavarian Reserve Division into the Merckem peninsula as a reinforcement.

During the night, French engineers, in water up to their armpits, built pontoon bridges over the lower Steenbeek, west of Langewaede. At about 5:00 a.m. on 27 October, French troops on the right bank were joined by those on the left bank of the Steenbeek and a column advanced from the bridgehead at Drei Grachten (Three Canals) to attack the German defences on the causeway to Luyghem. The French on the extreme right, in front of Draaibank, formed a flank guard facing east, near the troops in Papegoed Wood, which also protected the troops moving up from Steenstraate through Langewaede to Dixmude. The fortified villages of Verbrandesmis and Kippe blocked the road further on and north-east of Verbrandesmis near Houthulst Forest, Jesiutengoed Farm near the hamlet of Kloostermolen and the village of Aschhoop to the north, also obstructed an advance.

From Verbrandesmis a road runs north-west, parallel with the lower Steenbeek through Merckem to Luyghem, slightly above the level of the surrounding marshes. Machine-gun nests in the villages commanded the causeway from Drei Grachten; the ground everywhere in the peninsula was soaked and dotted with large numbers of blockhouses and pillboxes. The French artillery destroyed Verbrandesmis and it was quickly captured but the garrisons at Jesiutengoed Farm and Kloostermolen held out for some time, before being forced back to Kippe and Aschhoop. German artillery bombarded the banks of the Steenbeek in front of Merckem and French troops rushed across on pontoon bridges, struggled through the mud to the objectives and then attacked towards Kippe and Luyghem. Kippe and Aschhoop were captured quickly but Luyghem and the causeway from Drei Grachten held out until the afternoon.

The French and Belgian advance on Luyghem began as soon as the causeway was captured, Belgian troops employing flat-bottomed boats to move to the north of the village. The Belgians secured the southern edge of Blanckaart Lake and then attacked Luyghem from the north, taking the German pillboxes and blockhouses systematically. By the morning of 28 October, the French and Belgians had completed the capture of the Merckem peninsula, taken about 300 prisoners and inflicted many casualties on the Germans, who had defended with great determination. The skill of the French artillery had obtained success with few infantry casualties; the Belgians had managed to hide their boats despite German vigilance and row to their objectives through the floods against German artillery and small-arms fire.

=== Second stage ===
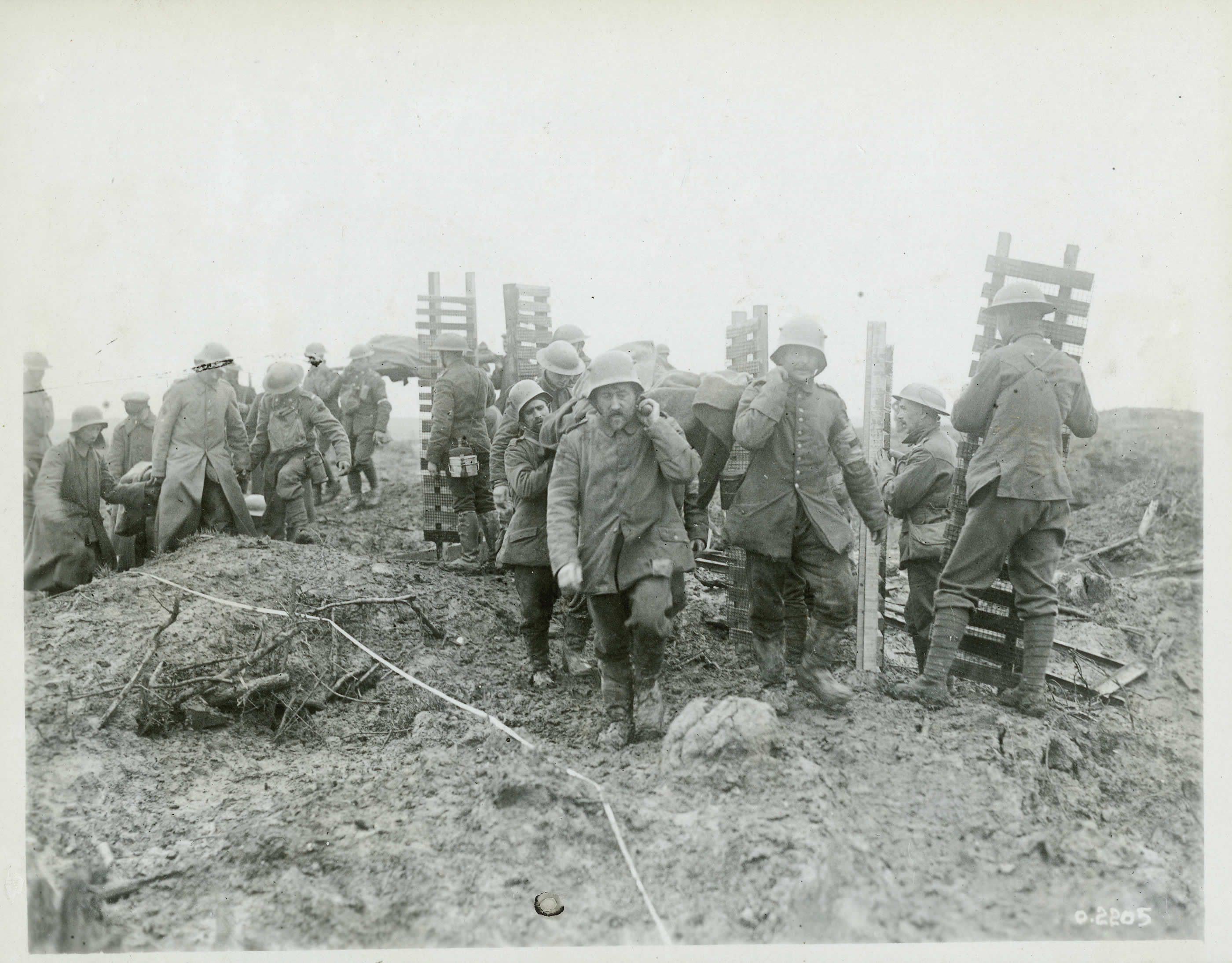
German prisoners help to carry casualties away from the front

The second stage on 30 October was intended to complete the capture of the positions the Canadian Corps had attacked on 26 October and gain a base for the final assault on Passchendaele. The objective (Blue Line) was approximately 600 yd (550 m) east of the objective of the previous stage. The advance was meant to capture the strongly held Crest Farm at the southern flank and in the northern sector, the hamlet of Meetcheele and the Goudberg area near the northern Corps boundary. In the north, the Canadian Corps advance was to link up outside Goudberg at Vapour Farm with the Fifth Army, which would be advancing with the 190th Brigade, 63rd (Royal Naval) Division and the 58th Division either side of the swamped Lekkerboterbeek. In the south, the advance was to link with the I Anzac Corps along the Ypres–Roulers railway line south of Vienna Cottage. The southern flank of the main assault would once again be the responsibility of the 4th Canadian Division, which planned to attack with the 12th Canadian Infantry Brigade. The northern flank remained the responsibility of the 3rd Canadian Division, which would advance with the 7th and 8th Canadian Infantry Brigades.

The night before the attack, a battalion assault by the Canadians captured a particularly troublesome German pillbox on the northern bank of Ravebeek creek, which had held up the 9th Canadian Infantry Brigade during the first stage. The action advanced the southern edge of the 3rd Canadian Division 500 yd (460 m) parallel with the line of the 4th Canadian Division to the south. The main attack began at 5:50 a.m. on 30 October, preceded by a rolling barrage and a preliminary artillery bombardment directed largely at pillboxes. The southern attack quickly captured Crest Farm and Canadian patrols pushed beyond the objective into Passchendaele, which they found the Germans evacuating. By 8:30 a.m., the 4th Canadian Division commander, Major-General David Watson, reported that all objectives between the Ypres–Roulers railway and the Ravebeek creek had been taken. Northwest of Crest Farm, the ground was so badly flooded that consolidation had to be carried out short of the objective.

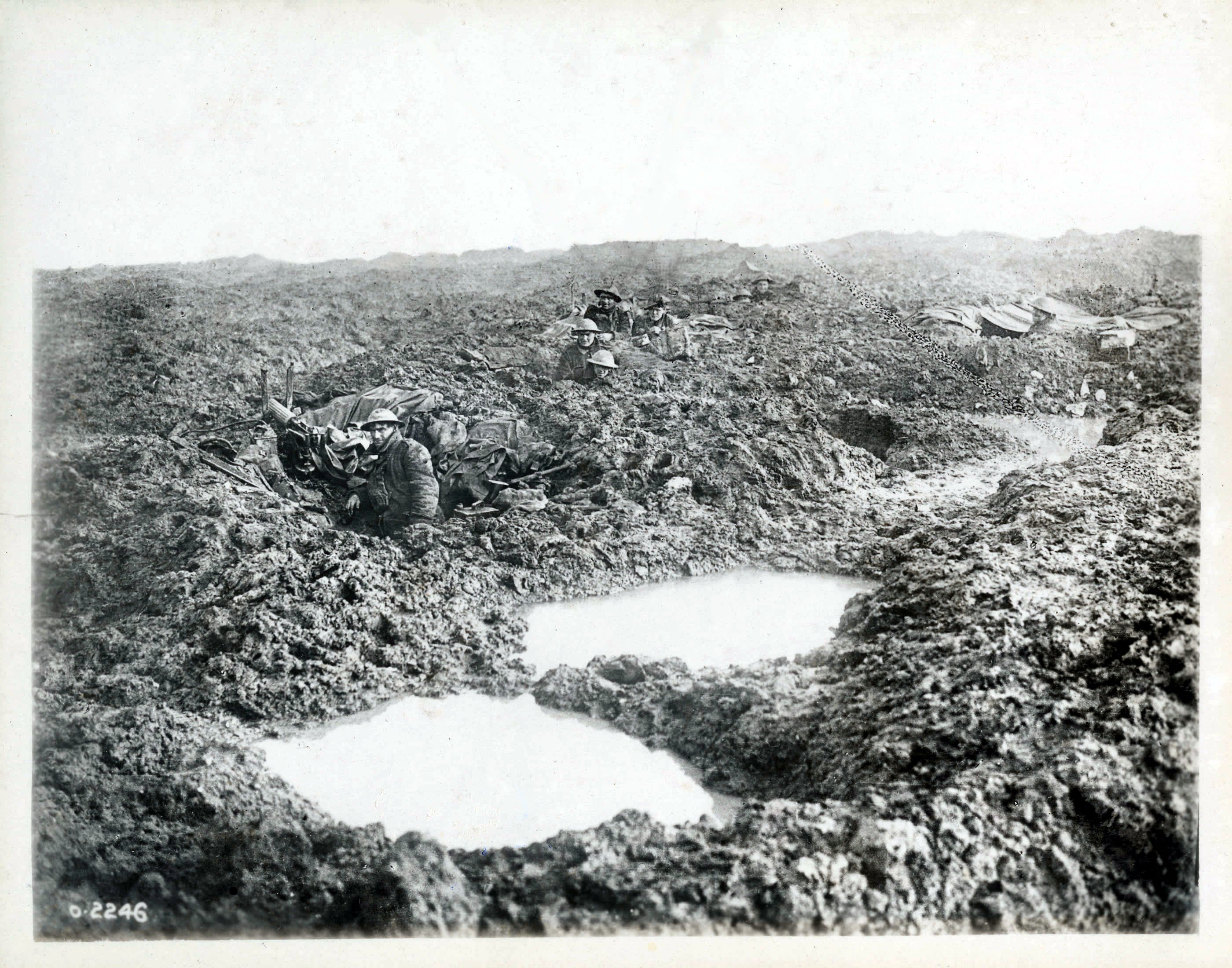
Canadian Machine Gun Company holding defensive positions

In the north, the 3rd Canadian Division was again met with exceptional German resistance. The 8th Canadian Infantry Brigade managed to capture Source Farm and later Vapour Farm at the corps boundary, just short of the objective. The brigade had difficulty getting through the swampy ground in the Woodland Plantation, resulting in a division in the line. The 63rd (Royal Naval) Division and the 58th Division troops were caught by German artillery fire at their jumping-off line and made only slight progress, in deep mud, against German machine-gun fire, leaving the Canadian flank open at Source Farm and Vapour Farm. Two Royal Naval companies later advanced through the Canadian sector to capture Source Trench but were only able to reinforce the Canadian outpost at Source Farm and form a defensive flank to Vapour Farm. In the centre, the 7th Canadian Infantry Brigade advanced between Ravebeek creek and the roadway to Meetcheele; one section of the brigade captured its intermediate objective, a pillbox known as Duck Lodge, by 7:00 a.m. To the west of the roadway and Meetcheele, the advance captured Furst Farm, albeit with heavy casualties. Later in the afternoon, the brigade overcame several pillboxes and captured the crossroads at Meetcheele. The Germans held on at a strong position at Graf House along the bank of the Ravebeek creek, producing a salient in the Canadian line between the two Canadian divisions.

The advance appeared to have reached its limit by late afternoon and reports of a large number of Germans concentrating north of Mosselmarkt indicated a possible counterattack. The 3rd Canadian Division (although short of some objectives) was ordered to consolidate and patrol, rather than occupy the Woodland Plantation swamp between the 7th and 8th Canadian Infantry Brigades. There was some question as to whether the positions at Source Farm and Vapour Farm could be maintained without the support of the 63rd (Royal Naval) Division. Currie and Plumer ultimately decided that every effort should be made to hold the line in the hope of not having to retake the positions before the assault on Passchendaele. The night passed without serious counterattack, permitting the Canadians to dig in. By the end of 30 October, the Canadian Corps had suffered 2,321 casualties, consisting of 884 killed, 1,429 wounded and eight taken prisoner. Further north the 63rd (Royal Naval) Division had 3,126 casualties from 26 to 31 October.

=== Tactical pause ===
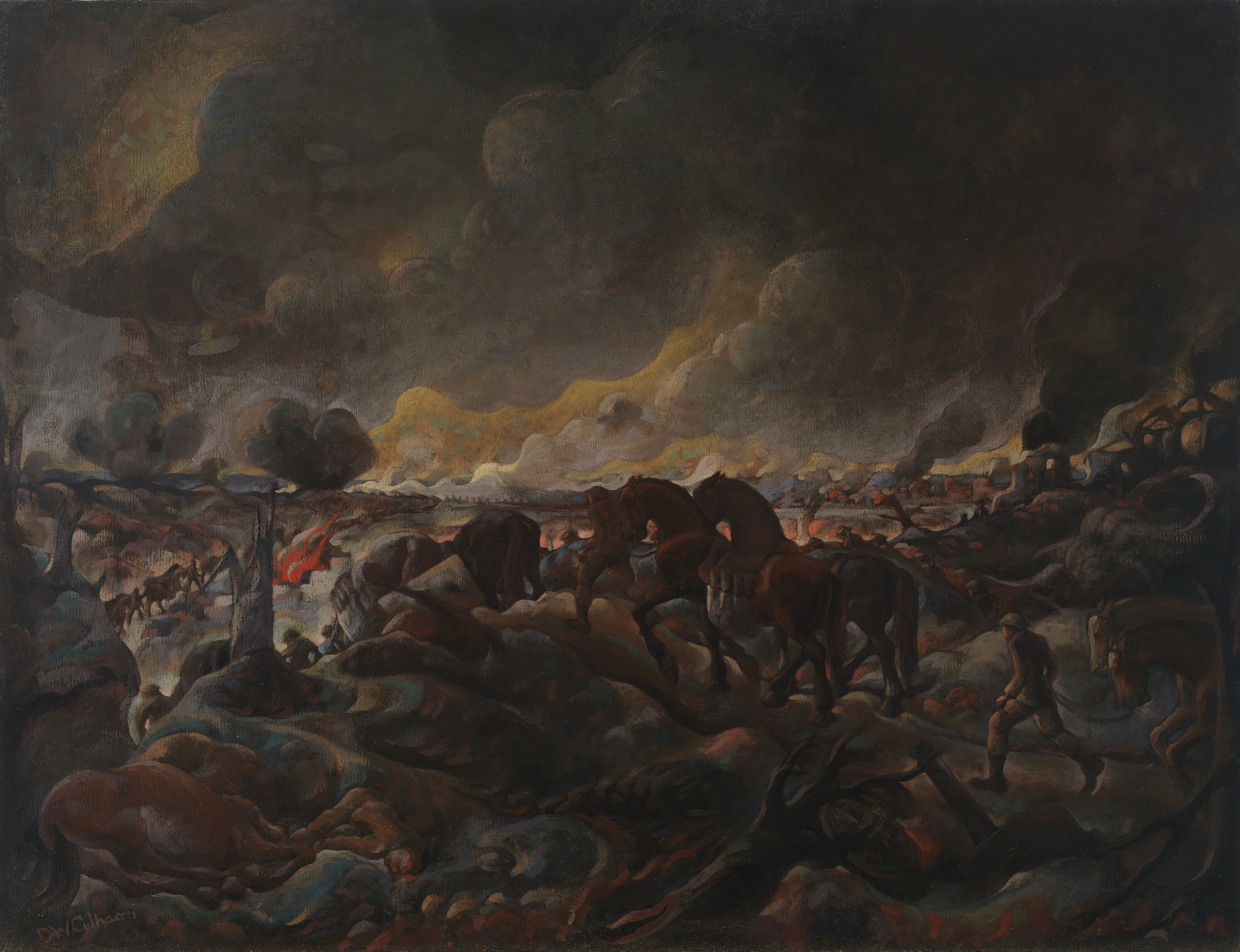
Douglas Culham's painting of a nighttime supply column during the battle

There was a seven-day pause between the second and third stages for divisional reliefs. The Second Army took over a section of the Fifth Army front adjoining the Canadian Corps, so that the central portion of the assault would have unity of command. On 2 November, Plumer relieved the XVIII Corps of the Fifth Army with II Corps. II Corps would provide the Canadian Corps with artillery support. Immediately north of the Canadian Corps, the 63rd Division was able to close up to the Paddebeek by attacking at night between 1 November and the night of 4/5 November, a method which took more ground than its attacks in October for a loss of 14 killed and 148 wounded.

No rain fell from 3 to 5 November, which aided preparations and reorganization of the troops for the next stage. Hundreds of pack animals were used to move supplies, including gun ammunition. The 1st and 2nd Canadian Divisions moved forward by rail from their reserve area east of Cassel and took over from the 3rd and 4th Canadian Divisions respectively, by the morning of 5 November. South of the Canadian Corps, the I Anzac, IX and VIII Corps were to simulate attacks along a 4 mi (6.4 km) front extending south to Zandvoorde. During the night of 5 November, the assault units moved to their jumping off positions and were ready by 4:00 a.m. on 6 November. The Germans also took advantage of the lull to relieve exhausted units. The 11th Division had arrived from the Champagne sector on 3 November to relieve the 39th Division between the Ypres–Roulers railway and the Mosselmarkt road.

=== Third stage ===
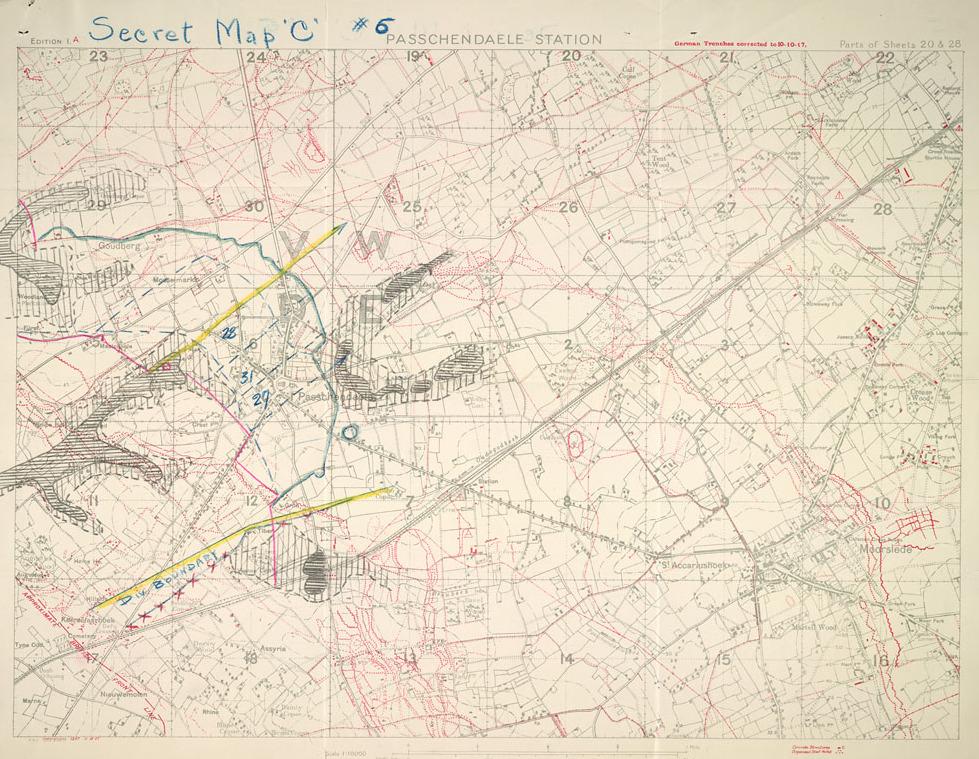
Third stage planning map of the 6th Canadian Infantry Brigade

The Corps objectives for 6 November lay along the Green Line, a rough semicircle that ran 1,000 yd (910 m) from Graf House, the centre of the salient in the Canadian line and enclosed Passchendaele and the hamlets of Mosselmarkt and Goudberg to the north-west. The 2nd Canadian Division would send the 6th Canadian Infantry Brigade to attack Passchendaele from the north and a battalion of the 5th Canadian Infantry Brigade to attack from the south. In the 1st Canadian Division sector, the 1st Canadian Infantry Brigade would advance on either side of the Meetcheele–Mosselmarkt road and along the northern corps boundary, one battalion to execute a subsidiary operation against Vine Cottages, a strong-point which the Germans were holding 350 yd (320 m) south-east of Vapour Farm. The third stage began at 6:00 a.m. on 6 November, with a preliminary bombardment under largely clear skies; the German counter-bombardment fell mainly behind the advancing troops. Almost everywhere the attack went well for the Canadians. The 2nd Canadian Division encountered most opposition from pillboxes at the north end of Passchendaele but in less than three hours, the village had been secured. The 1st Canadian Division encountered stiff resistance from the defenders of Vine Cottages but by 8:00 a.m., the 1st Canadian Infantry Brigade had reached and consolidated the Green Line.

=== Final attack ===
A final action to gain a nearby crossroads and the remaining high ground north of the village near Hill 52 was set for 10 November. The road junction was 1,000 yd (910 m) north of Passchendaele along the Westrozebeke road. Hill 52, the highest point on the northern end of the Passchendaele Ridge, was 500 yd (460 m) beyond the crossroads. Possession of the features would permit observation over German positions to the north-east. The 2nd Canadian Infantry Brigade was to attack with support from one battalion of the 4th Canadian Infantry Brigade. The Germans had used the lull to move up regiments from the 4th Division and 44th Reserve Division to replace the 11th Division on 9 November. The assault was launched from the Green Line, north and north-east of Mosselmarkt, on the morning of 10 November and made good initial progress, capturing the crossroads, over-running Venture Farm and capturing four 77 mm field guns. North of the Canadian Corps boundary, the supporting advance by the British 1st Division ran into trouble, when a German counterattack got into a gap between the 1st Battalion, South Wales Borderers and the 2nd Battalion, Royal Munster Fusiliers. The Germans engaged the British inner flanks with small-arms fire, causing many casualties and forcing back the survivors. Troops of the 2nd Canadian Infantry Brigade filled the gap and threw back a defensive flank along the corps boundary, stopping the German advance. Though Haig had hoped to have the entire Passchendaele–Westrozebeke ridge as a winter position, the line was still short of the village; attempts to reach Westrozebeke in late November and early December also failed.

== Aftermath ==
=== Analysis ===
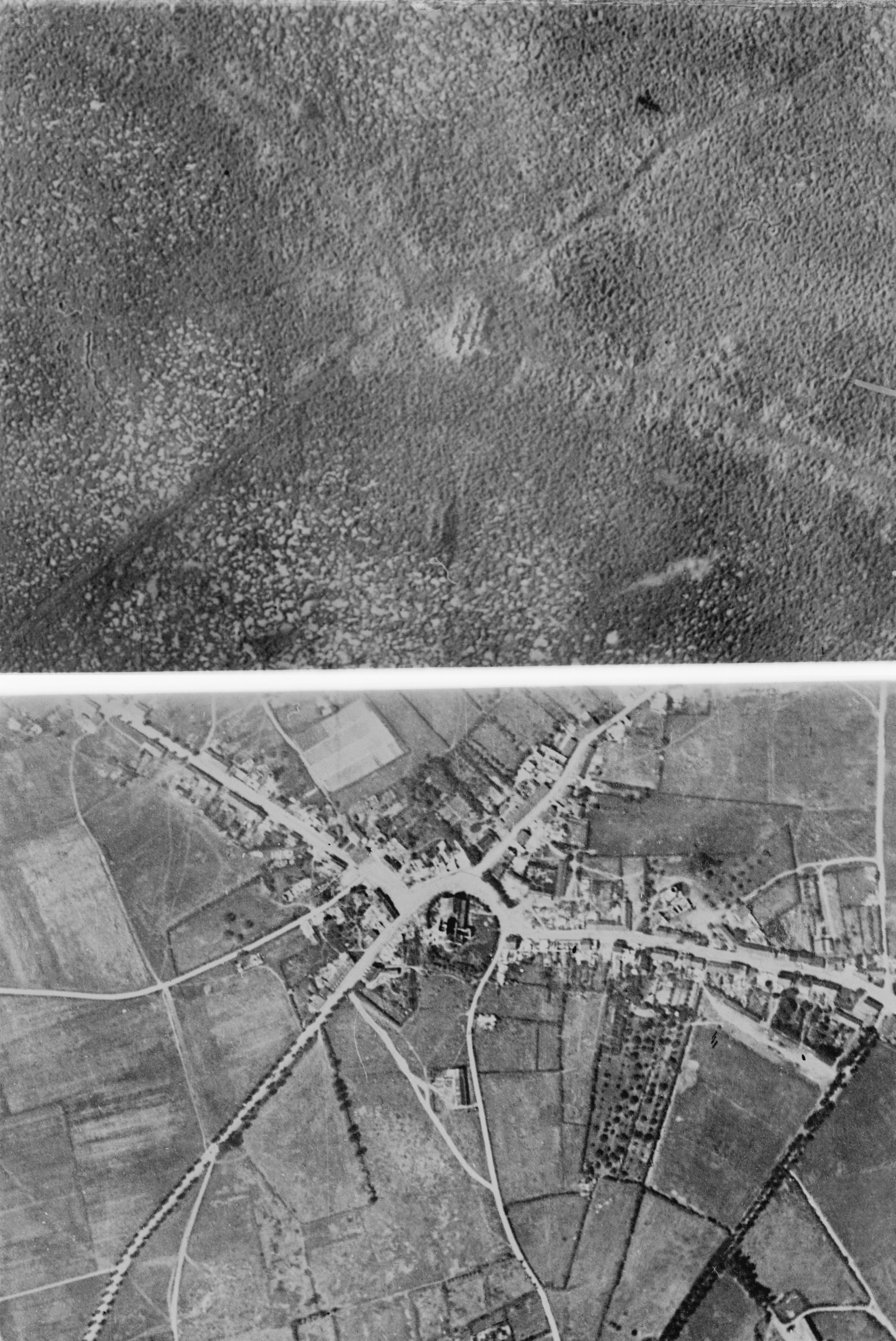
The village of Passchendaele before and after the battle

On 24 October, The Austro-German 14th Army (General der Infanterie Otto von Below) inflicted a great defeat on the Italian Army at the Battle of Caporetto. In fear that Italy might be put out of the war, the French and British Governments promised to send six divisions each to the Italian Front. The troops were rapidly and efficiently transferred between 10 November and 12 December, due to good administrative preparations made by the French Chief of Staff Ferdinand Foch, who had been sent to Italy in April 1917 to plan for such an emergency. The Third Battle of Ypres came to an unsatisfactory close as a result of the diversion of British forces, with Haig being forced to end his advance just short of Westroosebeke. On 14 November, a gradual relief of the Canadian divisions by VIII Corps began and on 20 November, Currie resumed command along the Lens–Vimy front.

=== Casualties ===
The Fifth Army suffered 14,219 casualties from 26 October to 9 November, Second Army casualties from 26 October to 10 November were 29,454, of which the Canadian Corps suffered 15,654 casualties. In the German Official History (Der Weltkrieg, 1942) the Reichsarchiv historians recorded 20,500 German casualties from 21 to 31 October and 9,500 casualties from 1 to 10 November. From 11 November to 31 December another 15,000 casualties were recorded.

=== Subsequent operations ===
On the night of 24/25 November, two battalions of the 8th Division advanced the line to the ridge crest and a German counterattack on 30 November was a costly failure. VIII Corps and II Corps conducted a larger operation on the night of 1/2 December and the British tried to cross no man's land without artillery support, to forestall the German artillery. Because of the moonlight, the infantry had to form up well behind their outpost line, many of the troops got stuck in the mud and some were caught by German machine-gun fire. The slow advance left some troops in the German barrage zone when the German artillery opened fire a minute after the start of the British barrage. The German outpost zone was overrun and the main line of defence breached at one point. After a local truce to recover wounded, a German counterattack forced the 32nd Division back to the start line, with the 8th Division dug-in about 100 yd (91 m) forward on the left and 200 yd (180 m) on the right. More British attacks were easily stopped by the Germans and at 4:10 p.m. a German counterattack was easily repulsed by the British. The attack failed to gain much ground but the German 25th Division had to be relieved on 3 December.

On 3 December, two battalions of the New Zealand Division attacked the Polderhoek Spur to shield the area north of the Reutelbeek stream from German observers at Gheluvelt, further south. The attack was made in daylight as a ruse, in the hope that the unusual time would surprise the German defenders, who would be under cover sheltering from the bombardments being fired at the same time each day. The ruse failed, some British artillery-fire dropped short on the New Zealanders, the Germans engaged the attackers with small-arms fire from Polderhoek Spur and Gheluvelt ridge; wind ruined a smoke screen. The New Zealanders suffered many casualties and were forced under cover 150 yd (140 m) short of the first objective; another attempt after dark was cancelled because of the full moon and sight of German reinforcements reaching Polderhoek Château. German counterattacks were repulsed over the next few days and the New Zealanders handed over to troops of IX Corps. The Germans used an observation balloon accurately to direct artillery-fire and on 14 December, the ground was re-captured by a German counterattack.

=== Victoria Cross ===
Nine Victoria Crosses, the highest military decoration for valour awarded to British and Commonwealth forces, were awarded for actions during the battle.

- Acting Captain Christopher O'Kelly of the 52nd (New Ontario) Battalion.
- Sergeant Robert Shankland of the 43rd (Cameron Highlanders of Canada) Battalion.
- Private Thomas William Holmes of the 4th Canadian Mounted Rifles Battalion.
- Private Cecil John Kinross of the 49th (Edmonton) Battalion.
- Sergeant George Mullin of Princess Patricia's Canadian Light Infantry.
- Acting Major George Pearkes of the 5th Canadian Mounted Rifles Battalion.
- Lieutenant Hugh McKenzie of the 7th Canadian Machine Gun Company.
- Corporal Colin Fraser Barron of the 3rd (Toronto) Battalion.
- Private James Peter Robertson of the 27th (City of Winnipeg) Battalion.

== Commemoration ==
For the Canadian Corps, participation in the Second Battle of Passchendaele is commemorated with the Passchendaele Memorial at the former site of the Crest Farm on the southwest fringe of Passchendaele village.
