= Loyal Edmonton Regiment =

Canadian infantry unit

The Loyal Edmonton Regiment
- Regimental badge
- Active: 1908–present
- Country: Canada
- Branch: Primary Reserve
- Type: Line infantry
- Role: Light infantry
- Size: One battalion
- Part of: 41 Canadian Brigade Group
- Garrison/HQ: Edmonton, Alberta
- Nicknames: Loyal Eddies; Eddies; LERs
- Motto: Fears no foe
- March: "Bonnie Dundee"
- Mascot: Lestock (coyote)
- Anniversaries: Battle of Ortona
- Engagements: World War I; World War II; Italian campaign; Allied invasion of Sicily; War in Afghanistan
- Battle honours: See #Battle honours
- Website: www.canada.ca/en/army/corporate/3-canadian-division/the-loyal-edmonton-regiment.html

Commanders
- Current commander: LCol Bryn Wright, CD
- Honorary colonel: HCol Douglas Cox
- Honorary lieutenant-colonel: HLCol Mary Cameron
- Regimental sergeant-major: CWO Kai Tam, CD

Insignia
- NATO Map Symbol
- Abbreviation: L Edmn R or LER

The Loyal Edmonton Regiment (4th Battalion, Princess Patricia's Canadian Light Infantry), or L Edmn R, is a Primary Reserve infantry unit of the Canadian Armed Forces based in Edmonton, Alberta. The Loyal Edmonton Regiment is part of 2nd Canadian Division's 41 Canadian Brigade Group. They are colloquially known as "The Loyal Eddies".

== Lineage ==
The Regimental Colour of the Loyal Edmonton Regiment.

The camp flag of the Loyal Edmonton Regiment.

=== The Loyal Edmonton Regiment ===
- Originated 1 April 1908 in Edmonton, Alberta as the 101st Regiment
- Redesignated 1 March 1909 as the 101st Regiment "Edmonton Fusiliers"
- Redesignated 15 March 1920 as The Edmonton Regiment
- Reorganized 15 March 1920 to form two separate regiments, The Edmonton Fusiliers and The Edmonton Regiment
- Redesignated 7 November 1940 as the 2nd (Reserve) Battalion, The Edmonton Regiment
- Redesignated 7 July 1943 as the 2nd (Reserve) Battalion, The Loyal Edmonton Regiment
- Redesignated 1 November 1945 as The Loyal Edmonton Regiment
- Redesignated 19 October 1954 as The Loyal Edmonton Regiment (3rd Battalion, Princess Patricia's Canadian Light Infantry)
- Redesignated 1 April 1970 as The Loyal Edmonton Regiment (4th Battalion, Princess Patricia's Canadian Light Infantry)

== Perpetuations ==
=== The Great War ===
- 49th Battalion (Edmonton Regiment), CEF
- 51st Battalion (Edmonton), CEF
- 63rd Battalion (Edmonton), CEF

== History ==
=== The Great War ===
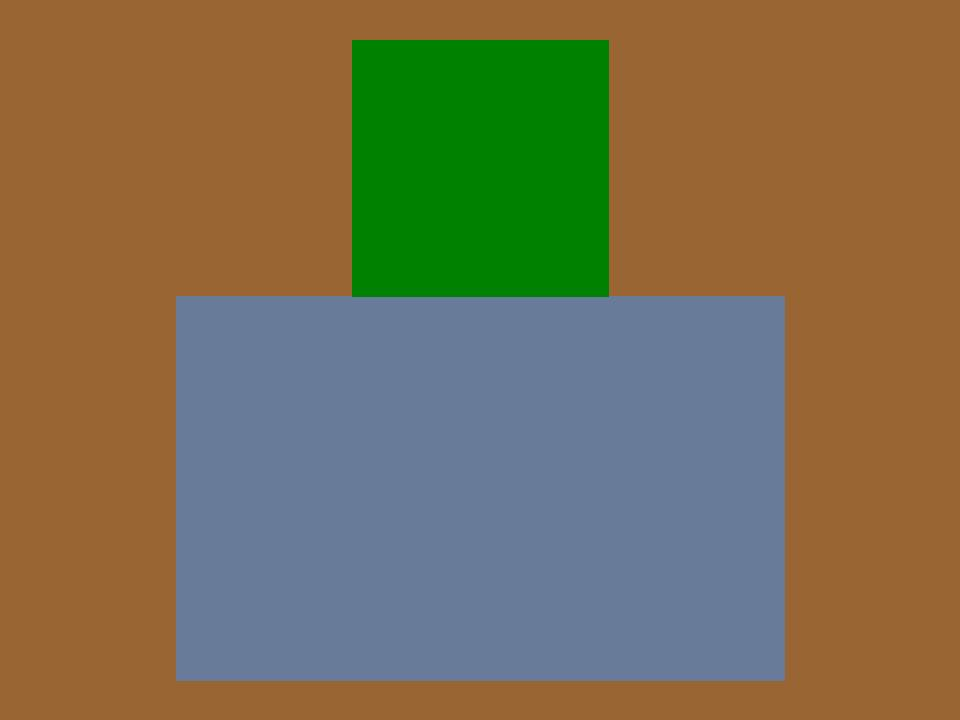
The distinguishing patch of the 49th Battalion (Edmonton Regiment), CEF

The 49th Battalion (Edmonton Regiment), CEF was authorized on 7 November 1914 and embarked for Great Britain on 3 June 1915. It disembarked in France on 9 October 1915, where it fought as part of the 7th Infantry Brigade, 3rd Canadian Division in France and Flanders until the end of the war. The battalion disbanded on 15 September 1920.

The 51st Battalion (Edmonton), CEF was authorized on 7 November 1914 and embarked for Great Britain on 1 April 1916. There it provided reinforcements for the Canadian Corps in the field until 13 November 1916, when it was reorganized as a Garrison Duty Battalion. On 22 June 1916, its personnel were absorbed by the various regimental depots. The battalion disbanded on 15 September 1920.

The 63rd Battalion (Edmonton), CEF was authorized on 20 April 1915 and embarked for Great Britain on 22 April 1916. There it provided reinforcements for the Canadian Corps in the field until 7 July 1916, when its personnel were absorbed by the 9th Reserve Battalion, CEF. The battalion disbanded on 1 September 1917.

=== Second World War ===
The regiment mobilized The Edmonton Regiment, CASF for active service on 1 September 1939. It was redesignated as the 1st Battalion, The Edmonton Regiment, CASF on 7 November 1940; and as the 1st Battalion, The Loyal Edmonton Regiment on 7 July 1943. On 22 December 1939, it embarked for Great Britain. Billeted in the Oxted and Limpsfield area, memorialised with memorabilia in the Oxted Royal British Legion clubhouse. "D" Company participated in the expedition to the Norwegian island of Spitzbergen on 25 August 1941, and the battalion landed in Sicily on 10 July and Italy on 3 September 1943, as part of the 2nd Infantry Brigade, 1st Canadian Infantry Division. The unit landed in France on 15 March 1945 as part of Operation Goldflake, on its way to the Northwest Europe theatre of operations, in which it fought until the end of the war. The overseas battalion disbanded on 15 October 1945.

- Leonforte, July 1943. According to Mitcham and von Stauffenberg in The Battle of Sicily, The Loyal Edmonton Regiment allegedly killed captured German prisoners.

On 1 June 1945, a second Active Force component of the regiment was mobilized for service in the Pacific theatre of operations, as under the 3rd Canadian Infantry Battalion (The Loyal Edmonton Regiment), CASF. The battalion disbanded on 1 November 1945.

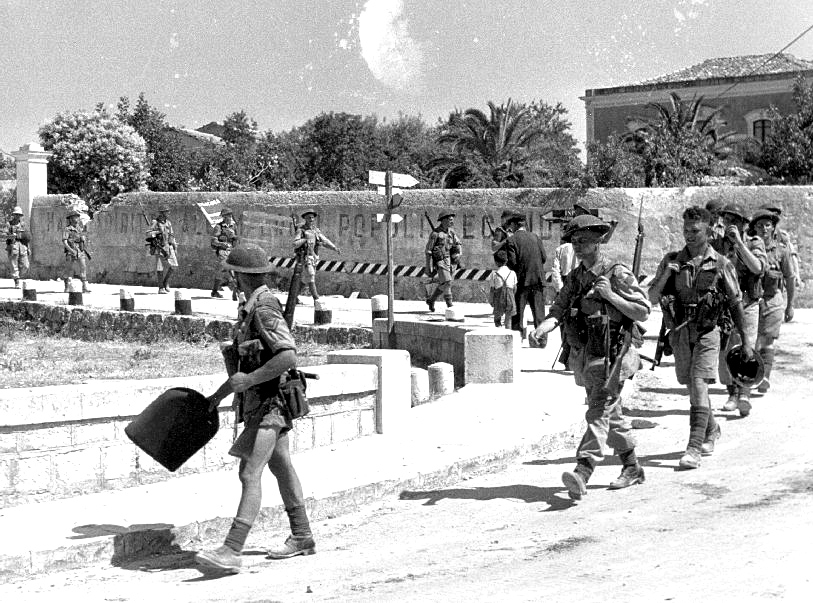
Troops of The Loyal Edmonton Regiment enter Modica during the Allied invasion of Sicily (1943)

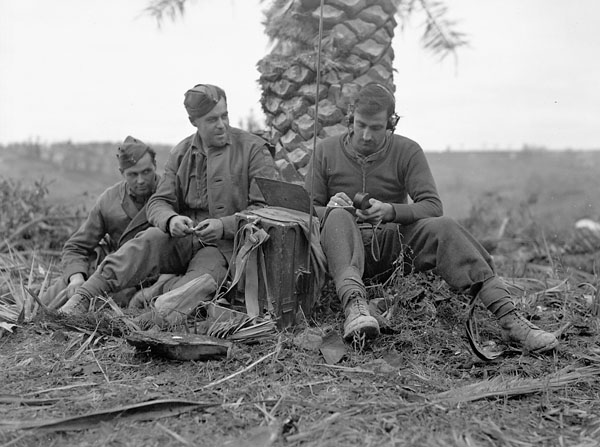
Infantrymen of The Loyal Edmonton Regiment operating a No. 18 wireless set outside Regimental Headquarters, Ortona, Italy, December 21, 1943

=== Post-War: Korea and NATO ===
On 4 May 1951, the regiment mobilized two temporary Active Force companies designated "E" and "F" Companies. "E" Company was reduced to nil strength when its personnel were incorporated into the 1st Canadian Infantry Battalion (later the 3rd Battalion, The Canadian Guards) for service in Germany with the North Atlantic Treaty Organization. It disbanded on 29 July 1953. "F" Company was initially used as a reinforcement pool for "E" Company. On 15 May 1952, it was reduced to nil strength, when its personnel were absorbed by the newly formed 2nd Canadian Infantry Battalion (later the 4th Battalion, The Canadian Guards) for service in Korea with the United Nations. "F" Company disbanded on 29 July 1953.

=== Afghanistan ===
The regiment contributed an aggregate of more than 20% of its authorized strength to the various Task Forces which served in Afghanistan between 2002 and 2014. It suffered three dead and numerous injured during this war.

=== Recent activities ===
The unit continues to carry out individual and small unit training locally and across Canada. The L EDMN R has continued to support NATO, UN, and Canadian domestic operations with multiple individual and group deployments.

The regiment expanded to Yellowknife, Northwest Territories, with the establishment of C Company, The Loyal Edmonton Regiment, in August 2009.

In the summer of 2018, The Loyal Edmonton Regiment and Calgary Highlanders were tasked with standing up a mortar platoon that deployed to the Forward Presence Battle Group in Latvia in early 2020. This was the first Primary Reserve mortar platoon to deploy overseas.

=== Lineage chart ===
Lineage chart

1908	101st Regt
1909	101st Regt "Edmonton Fusiliers"
1914	49th Bn, CEF	51st Bn, CEF	63rd "Overseas" Bn, CEF
1916	Absorbed by various regimental depots	Absorbed by 9th Reserve Bn
1920	Disbanded	1st Bn (49th Bn, CEF), The Edmonton Regt	2nd Bn (Edmonton Fusiliers) (9th Bn, CEF), The Edmonton Regt	3rd Bn (51st Bn, CEF), (Note: Reserve) The Edmonton Regt	4th Bn (63rd Bn, CEF), The Edmonton Regt
1924	The Edmonton Fusiliers	2nd Bn (51st Bn, CEF), The Edmonton Regt	3rd Bn (63rd Bn, CEF), The Edmonton Regt
1936	The Edmonton Regt	Disbanded	Disbanded
1939	The Edmonton Regt, CASF
1940	1st Bn, The Edmonton Regt, CASF	2nd (Reserve) Bn, The Edmonton Regt
1943	1st Bn, The Loyal Edmonton Regt	2nd (Reserve) Bn, The Loyal Edmonton Regt
1945	3rd Canadian Infy Bn (The Loyal Edmonton Regt), CASF
1945	Disbanded	Disbanded	The Loyal Edmonton Regt
1951	"E" Coy, (Note: Reserve Force) The Loyal Edmonton Regt	"F" Coy, The Loyal Edmonton Regt
1951	Absorbed by 1st Canadian Infy Bn
1952	Absorbed by 2nd Canadian Infy Bn
1954	The Loyal Edmonton Regt (3rd Bn, PPCLI)
1970	The Loyal Edmonton Regt (4th Bn, PPCLI)

== Alliances ==
- United Kingdom: The Duke of Lancaster's Regiment (King's Lancashire and Border)

== Battle honours ==
In the list below, battle honours in capitals were awarded for participation in large operations and campaigns, while those in lowercase indicate honours granted for more specific battles. Those battle honours followed by a "+" are emblazoned on the regimental colour.

The Regimental Colour

=== Great War ===
- Mount Sorrel+, 2–13 June 1916
- Somme, 1916+, 1 July–18 November 1916
- Flers–Courcelette+, 15–22 September 1916
- Ancre Heights, 1 October–11 November 1916
- Arras, 1917, 9 April–4 May 1917
- Vimy, 1917+, 9–14 April 1917
- Hill 70+, 15–25 August 1917
- Ypres, 1917, 31 July–10 November 1917
- Passchendaele+, 12 October 1917 or 26 October–10 November 1917
- Amiens+, 8–11 August 1918
- Arras, 1918+, 26 August–3 September 1918
- Scarpe, 1918+, 26–30 August 1918
- Hindenburg Line+, 12 September–9 October 1918
- Canal du Nord, 27 September–2 October 1918
- Pursuit to Mons+, 11 November 1918
- France and Flanders, 1915–18

=== Second World War ===
- Landing in Sicily+, 9–12 July 1943+
- Piazza Armerina, 16–17 July 1943
- Leonforte, 21–22 July 1943
- Agira, 24–28 July 1943
- Adrano+, 29 July–7 August 1943+
- Troina Valley, 2–6 August 1943
- Sicily, 1943, 9 July 1943 – 17 August 1943
- Colle d'Anchise, 22–24 October 1943
- The Gully, 10–19 December 1943
- Ortona+, 20–28 December 1943+
- Liri Valley+, 18–30 May 1944+
- Hitler Line, 18–24 May 1944
- Gothic Line+, 25 August–22 September 1944+
- Monteciccardo, 27–28 August 1944
- Monte Luro, 1 September 1944
- Rimini Line+, 14–21 September 1944+
- Pisciatello+, 16–19 September 1944+
- San Fortunato, 18–20 September 1944
- Savio Bridgehead+, 20–23 September 1944+
- Naviglio Canal+, 12–15 December 1944+
- Fosso Munio, 19–21 December 1944
- Italy, 1943–1945, 3 September 1943 – 22 April 1945
- Apeldoorn, 11–17 April 1945
- North-West Europe, 1945+

=== War in Afghanistan ===
- Afghanistan+

== Victoria Cross recipients ==
- Private Cecil John Kinross, VC
- Private John Chipman Kerr, VC

== Regimental badge ==
The maple leaves symbolise service to Canada and the regiment's perpetuated units, the 51st and 63rd Battalions of the Canadian Expeditionary Force, and the crown, service to the Sovereign. The number 49 represents the service of the perpetuated unit, the 49th Battalion of the Canadian Expeditionary Force, and the windmill sails allude to the battlefields in Flanders on which the battalion fought in the First World War. The coyote's head commemorates "Lestock", a prairie coyote presented to the regiment as a mascot prior to the 49th Battalion's departure for overseas service in 1915. The red rose came from the badge of the former allied regiment The Loyal Regiment (North Lancashire) (now, through amalgamation, the Duke of Lancaster's Regiment). "THE LOYAL EDMONTON REGIMENT" is a form of the regimental title.

== Loyal Edmonton Regiment Military Museum ==
The Loyal Edmonton Regiment Military Museum is in Edmonton in the Prince of Wales Armouries Heritage Centre, the building where the regiment was based from 1920 to 1965. The building also houses the City of Edmonton Archives and the Telephone Historical Centre. The museum features two galleries and several smaller exhibits, and displays include historic firearms, uniforms, souvenirs, memorabilia, military accoutrements, and photos. The museum features an exhibit on the role of the 49th Battalion, CEF in Canada's Hundred Days Offensive.

== Media ==
- A City Goes to War: History of the Loyal Edmonton Regiment (3PPCLI) by Lieut-Colonel G. R. Stevens (1964)
- Our Quarrel with the Foe: Edmonton's Soldiers 1914-1918 by Ian Edwards (2020)

== Order of precedence ==
Preceded by The Rocky Mountain Rangers	The Loyal Edmonton Regiment (4th Battalion, Princess Patricia's Canadian Light Infantry)	Succeeded by The Queen's Own Cameron Highlanders of Canada
