= Harefield =

Village in Hillingdon, London, England

Coordinates: 51.6034°N 0.4780°W

- Village
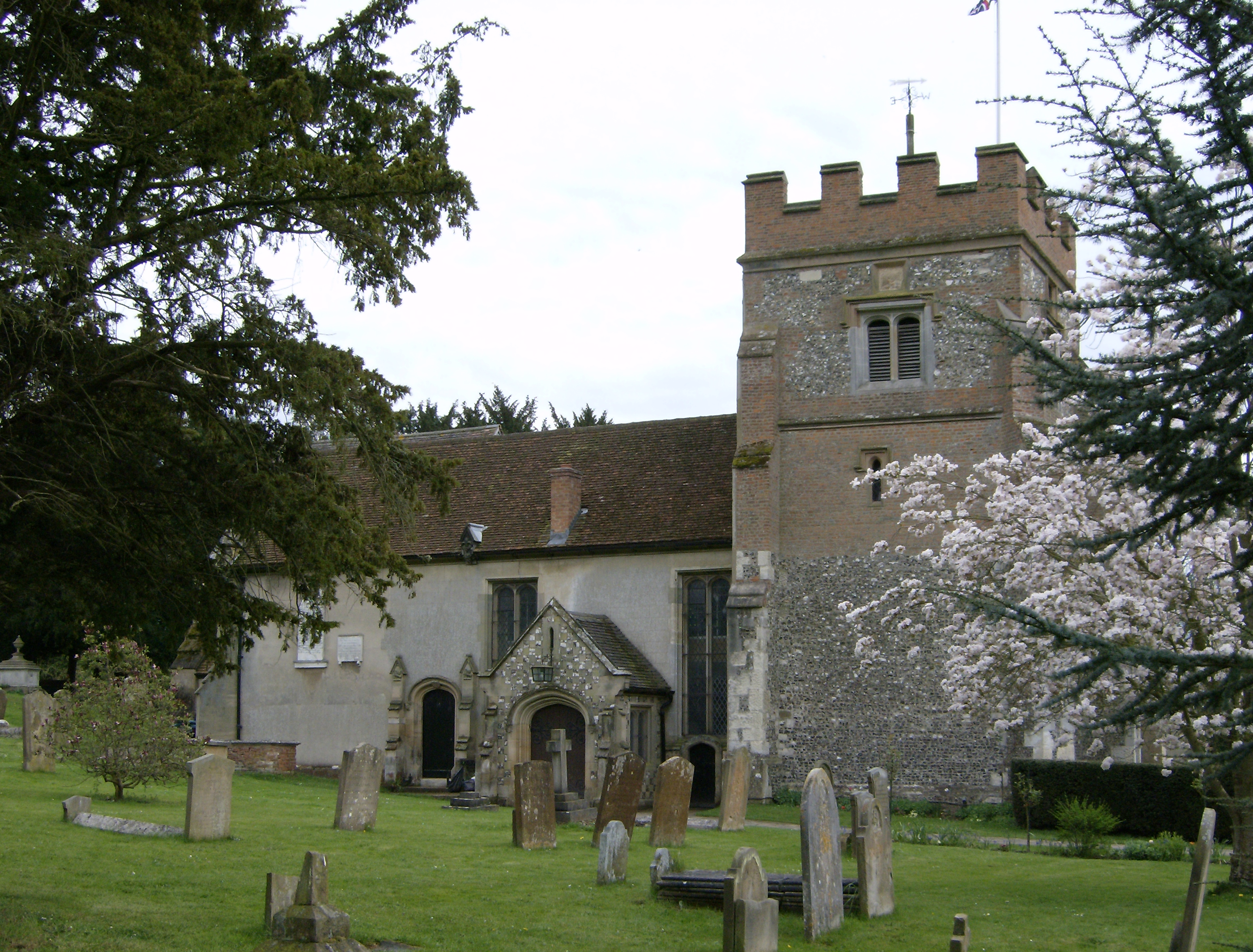
- St Mary the Virgin Church, Harefield

- Location within Greater London
- Population: 7,399 (2011)
- OS grid reference: TQ055905
  - Charing Cross: 17 mi (27 km) SE
- London borough: Hillingdon
- Ceremonial county: Greater London
- Region: London
- Country: England
- Sovereign state: United Kingdom
- Post town: UXBRIDGE
- Postcode district: UB9
- Dialling code: 01895
- Police: Metropolitan
- Fire: London
- Ambulance: London
- UK Parliament: Ruislip, Northwood and Pinner
- London Assembly: Ealing and Hillingdon

Harefield is a village in the London Borough of Hillingdon, England, 17 miles (27 km) northwest of Charing Cross near Greater London's boundary with Buckinghamshire to the west and Hertfordshire to the north. The population at the 2011 Census was 7,399.

Nearby areas include: Denham, Ickenham, Northwood, Rickmansworth, Ruislip and Uxbridge. Pioneering heart surgery techniques were developed at Harefield Hospital.

== History ==
Two sites near Dewes Farm have produced late Mesolithic artefacts. Harefield enters recorded history through the Domesday Book (1086) as Herefelle, comprising the Anglo-Saxon words Here "[Danish] army" (cf. the English fyrd) and felle (later feld), "field". Before the Norman conquest of England, the Manor of Harefield belonged to Countess Goda, the sister of Edward the Confessor. Her husbands were French, Dreux of the Vexin and Count Eustace of Boulogne.

Following the Norman conquest, ownership of Harefield passed to Richard FitzGilbert, the son of Count Gilbert of Brionne. It was listed in the Domesday Book as comprising enough arable land for five ploughs, with meadow land only sufficient for one plough. Woodland areas in Middlesex were registered in the number of pigs which could be supported there; Harefield had 1,200, the second highest in the Hundred of Elthorne to Ruislip, with 1,500. Ten villeins (tenants) are also counted; they held their land freely from the lord in exchange for rent payments and labour. By the 12th or 13th century their land is believed to have passed back to the lord and become unfree. There were also seven bordars (poorer tenants) with five acres each, while one had three. In addition, three cottars, who owned a cottage and garden, also feature.

Harefield was eventually split into the main manor of Harefield, and the two smaller submanors of Brackenbury and Moorhall. It had been owned by the Clares, descended from Richard FitzGilbert, before passing to the Batchworths by 1235. In turn, the Swanlord family took possession in 1315. By 1446, the Newdigate family owned Harefield – they still owned some land in the 1920s. John Newdigate exchanged most of his land in 1585 with the Chief Justice of the Court of Common Pleas, Sir Edmund Anderson. He sold the manor to Sir Thomas Egerton, who staged an elaborate entertainment for Queen Elizabeth in 1602.

During World War I, Harefield Park was used as an Australian military hospital. The bodies of the servicemen who died there were buried with full military honours within the graveyard of St Mary's Church; the area, which also included the ground where the Harefield Place building stood, became a military cemetery.

== Politics ==
Harefield is part of the Ruislip, Northwood and Pinner constituency for elections to the House of Commons of the United Kingdom.

Harefield is part of the Harefield Village ward for elections to Hillingdon London Borough Council.

In 1894 Harefield became part of Uxbridge Rural District. In 1929 Harefield became part of the Municipal Borough of Uxbridge. On 1 April 1938 the civil parish was abolished and merged with Uxbridge. At the 1931 census (the last before the abolition of the parish), Harefield had a population of 4,140. In 1965 it became part of the London Borough of Hillingdon.

== Notable buildings ==
=== Harefield Hospital ===
Harefield Hospital is a world-famous heart and lung hospital. It is part of the Royal Brompton & Harefield NHS Foundation Trust, the largest specialist heart and lung centre in the UK, and among the largest in Europe. Its sister hospital in the trust is the Royal Brompton Hospital in Chelsea.

Sir Magdi Yacoub, consultant cardiothoracic surgeon at Harefield Hospital (1969–2002), carried out the first live lobe lung transplant, and went on to perform more transplants than any other surgeon in the world. By the end of the 1980s Harefield Hospital was the leading transplant centre. Magdi Yacoub was involved in the development of heart and heart-lung transplants.

=== St Mary the Virgin Church ===
St Mary's Parish Church (off Church Hill) is Harefield's oldest building and an important focal point for the Harefield community. A priest is first mentioned in the manor of Harefield in the Domesday Book (1086). In the late 12th century the advowson was given to the Knights Hospitallers, although the Newdigate family later became patrons of the church. The church building has some medieval features, but was restored and altered in 1768, and again in 1841.

The church cemetery contains the graves of over 100 soldiers of the First Australian Imperial Force who died at No. 1 Australian Auxiliary Hospital (Harefield Park Hospital) after being wounded in World War I. Each year on Anzac Day a commemoration service is attended by local dignitaries, representatives from the Australian and New Zealand governments, local school children and many retired servicemen.

The church holds the tomb in which Alice Stanley, Dowager Countess of Derby was laid to rest in January 1637. Dowager Stanley was a Spencer, from Althorp in Northamptonshire, of the family to which Diana, Princess of Wales belonged.

Shersby's grave

Sir Michael Shersby, MP for Uxbridge from 1972 to 1997, is buried in the churchyard along with his widow Lady Barbara.

=== Harefield Place ===
The ancient Manor of Harefield was held by the Newdigate family from about 1440. The old Manor house, Harefield Place, adjacent to St Mary the Virgin church, was replaced in 1786, when a new mansion house was built at Harefield Lodge. The old 'Harefield Place' fell into disrepair and was demolished in 1813, whereupon the new Manor house became known as Harefield Place. This was sold by Charles Newdigate Newdegate in 1877. In 1938 it was acquired by the local authority to serve as a hospital. In 1959 the land was redeveloped and is now the Harefield Place Golf Club. The gardens and parkland of the old manor are listed at Grade II on the Register of Historic Parks and Gardens of Special Historic Interest in England.

Harefield House, a Grade II listed building, High Street, Harefield, was built by Sir Roger Newdigate in about 1750. During World War I it served as No. 1 Australian Auxiliary Hospital. In 1937 it was acquired by the Ministry of Defence. After 1982 the building was restored and converted to office use. In 2015 the building was used as the filming location for the interior of the island mansion in the TV adaptation of Agatha Christie's mystery novel And Then There Were None.

Breakspear House (Breakspears), a Grade I listed building, originally constructed in the 17th century also falls within Harefield.

=== The Harefield Academy ===
The Harefield Academy replaced the John Penrose School in September 2005. The new academy is an age 11 to 18 school with accommodation for 750 students aged 11 to 15 and a further 250 post-16 students.

=== Harefield Limeworks ===
The now abandoned Harefield Limeworks, which backs on to the Grand Union Canal, is known for its hanging monkey sculptures and is popular among urban explorers.

== Sport ==
Harefield is home to Harefield United Football Club, which was founded in 1868 and is the oldest in Middlesex.

Harefield is home to Harefield Cricket Club, whose first and second teams play their matches at the Woods Cricket Ground on Breakspear Road North.

Harefield is also home to an Elite Gymnastics Academy.

== Victoria Cross recipients ==
Harefield is associated with three recipients of the Victoria Cross.

- Lieutenant-General Gerald Goodlake VC (1832–1890), who served with the Coldstream Guards in the Crimean War, is buried in St Mary's parish churchyard.
- Private Cecil John Kinross VC (1896–1957), who distinguished himself at Passchendaele in World War I, was born in Harefield; he moved with his family in 1912 to Lougheed, Alberta.
- Sergeant Robert Edward Ryder VC (1895–1978), who served in World War I in the Middlesex Regiment, was born and is buried in Harefield. A blue plaque on The Old Workhouse marks his birthplace.

A gold plaque in the Royal British Legion Hall honours the exceptional bravery of both Goodlake VC and Ryder VC. In 2011, Hillingdon Council erected a blue plaque in honour of the courage of Kinross VC at the place of his birth.

== Other notable people ==
- Rhodes Boyson (1925–2012), Conservative Member of Parliament, moved into Cedar House nursing home in Harefield, where he died aged 87.
- Brian Connolly (1945–1997), singer of glam rock band Sweet grew up in Harefield and Hayes from the age of 12.
- Thomas Egerton, Lord Ellesmere (1540–1617) and wife Alice Spencer (1559–1637), lived in Harefield from 1601; Queen Elizabeth I visited the couple in July 1602.
- Alexander Fleming (1881–1955), biologist and Nobel Prize winner for the discovery of penicillin, was Regional Pathologist at Harefield Hospital, 1939; this is recorded on a blue plaque at the main entrance door to the hospital.
- Russell Grant (born 1951), TV astrologer, grew up in Harefield and was head chorister at St Mary's parish church.
- Politician Charles Newdigate (1816–1887), lived in Harefield, and was buried in Harefield Church.
- Judge Sir Richard Newdigate (1602–1678), lived in Harefield, and was buried in Harefield parish church.
- Henry Avray Tipping (1855–1933), designed and built Little Hammonds in Breakspear Road North.
- Thomas Wakley (1795–1862), medical and social reformer, and founder of The Lancet, lived at Harefield Park, 1845–1856; he has a memorial stone in the grounds of Harefield Hospital.

== Transport ==
There is no tube or railway station in Harefield. However buses in the area link to Northwood and Uxbridge tube stations and Denham and Rickmansworth railway stations. Harefield is served by route 331 operating between Uxbridge and Ruislip, and route U9 between Uxbridge and Harefield Hospital. The Grand Union Canal, formerly the Grand Junction Canal, passes directly west of Harefield.

=== Nearest Underground stations ===
- Moor Park
- Northwood
- Rickmansworth
- Uxbridge
- Ickenham

=== Nearest railway stations ===
- Denham
- Rickmansworth
