= Robert Edward Ryder =

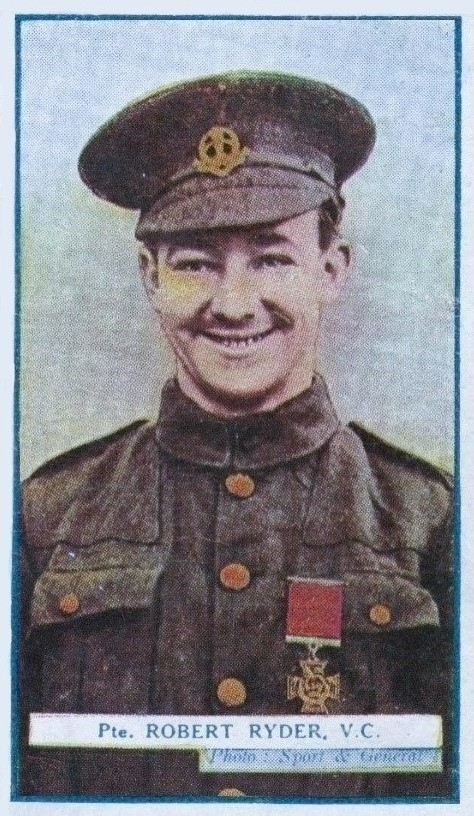
- Private Ryder on a cigarette card
- Born: 17 December 1895; Harefield, Middlesex, England
- Died: 1 December 1978; Hucknall, Nottinghamshire, England
- Burial place: St Mary the Virgin Churchyard, Harefield
- Military career
- Allegiance: United Kingdom
- Branch: British Army
- Rank: Sergeant
- Units: Middlesex Regiment
- Conflicts: World War I
- Awards: Victoria Cross; Bronze Medal of Military Valor (Italy)

Robert Edward Ryder VC (17 December 1895 – 1 December 1978) was an English recipient of the Victoria Cross, the highest and most prestigious award for gallantry in the face of the enemy that can be awarded to British and Commonwealth forces.

== Biography ==
Ryder was 20 years old, and a private in the 12th Battalion, The Middlesex Regiment (Duke of Cambridge's Own), British Army during the First World War when the following deed took place for which he was awarded the VC.

On 26 September 1916 at Thiepval, France, Private Ryder's company was held up by heavy rifle fire and all his officers had become casualties. For want of leadership the attack was flagging when Private Ryder, realising the situation and without a moment's thought for his own safety dashed, absolutely alone, at the enemy trench and by skilful handling of his Lewis gun succeeded in clearing the trench. This very gallant act inspired his comrades, made the subsequent advance possible and turned what could have been failure into success.

He later achieved the rank of sergeant.

== The Medal ==
His Victoria Cross is displayed at the Lord Ashcroft VC Gallery in the Imperial War Museum in London, England.
