= Colin Fraser Barron =

Recipient of the Victoria Cross

Sergeant Major Colin Fraser Barron VC
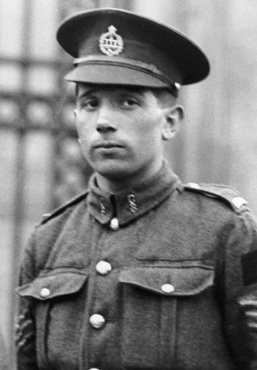
- Colin Fraser Barron as a sergeant.
- Born: 20 September 1893; Baldavie, Boyndie, Banffshire, Scotland
- Died: 15 August 1958 (aged 64); Toronto, Ontario, Canada
- Burial place: Prospect Cemetery, Toronto (Sec 7 Lot 3562)
- Military career
- Allegiance: Canada
- Branch: Canadian Militia: Canadian Expeditionary Force; Canadian Army
- Rank: Sergeant-Major
- Service number: No. 404017
- Units: 1st Canadian Division: 1st Canadian Infantry Brigade; 3rd (Toronto) Battalion; Royal Regiment of Canada
- Conflicts: World War I: Western Front; Battle of Passchendaele; Second Battle of Passchendaele; World War II
- Awards: Victoria Cross

Colin Fraser Barron VC (20 September 1893 – 15 August 1958) was a Canadian recipient of the Victoria Cross, the highest and most prestigious award for gallantry in the face of the enemy that can be awarded to British and Commonwealth forces. He was born at Boyndie, Banffshire, Scotland, a son of Margaret Walker Barron, a domestic servant. He was raised in a large household by his grandparents Joseph Barron & Mary (née Reid) Barron along with his brother Alexander Barron and many other half-siblings and aunts and uncles. He emigrated to Canada in 1910, and enlisted in the Canadian Expeditionary Force in 1914.

Barron was 24 years old, and a Corporal in the 3rd (Toronto) Battalion, CEF during the First World War when he was awarded the Victoria Cross, the full citation for which reads as follows:

For conspicuous bravery when in attack his unit was held up by three machine-guns. Corpl. Barron opened on them from a flank at point-blank range, rushed the enemy guns single-handed, killed four of the crew, and captured the remainder. He then, with remarkable initiative and skill, turned one of the captured guns on the retiring enemy, causing them severe casualties. The remarkable dash and determination displayed by this N.C.O. in rushing the guns produced far-reaching results, and enabled the advance to be continued.

He later achieved the rank of sergeant-major, and during the Second World War he served with the Royal Regiment of Canada.
