= 63rd Battalion (Edmonton), CEF =

63rd "Overseas" Battalion, CEF
- Active: 1915–1916
- Disbanded: 1917
- Country: Canada
- Branch: Canadian Expeditionary Force
- Type: Infantry
- Battle honours: The Great War, 1916

The 63rd Battalion (Edmonton), CEF, was an infantry battalion of the Canadian Expeditionary Force during the First World War. The 63rd Battalion was authorized on 20 April 1915. During its recruitment phase the battalion sent three reinforcing drafts to England on 11 September 1915, 22 January and 2 March 1916. The battalion as a whole embarked for Great Britain from Halifax on 22 April 1916 on board the troopship Metagama. It provided reinforcements for the Canadian Corps in the field until 7 July 1916, when its personnel were absorbed by the 9th Reserve Battalion, CEF. The battalion was subsequently disbanded on 1 September 1917.

The battalion recruited in Medicine Hat, Calgary and Edmonton, Alberta, and was mobilized at Edmonton.

The battalion was commanded by Lieutenant-Colonel G.B. McLeod from 25 April 1916 to 6 July 1916.

The battalion was awarded the battle honour The Great War, 1916.

The perpetuation of the 63rd Battalion (Edmonton), CEF, was assigned in 1920 to the 4th Battalion, the Edmonton Regiment. This regiment, now the Loyal Edmonton Regiment (4th Battalion, Princess Patricia's Canadian Light Infantry) continues to perpetuate the 63rd's history and traditions.

== Sources ==
- Canadian Expeditionary Force 1914–1919 by Col. G.W.L. Nicholson, CD, Queen's Printer, Ottawa, Ontario, 1962
