= Middlesex Regiment =

Infantry regiment of the British Army

Duke of Cambridge's Own (Middlesex Regiment) Middlesex Regiment (Duke of Cambridge's Own)
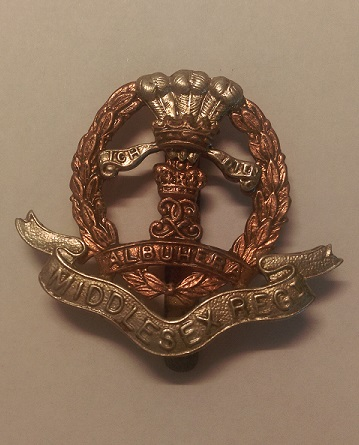
- Cap Badge of the Middlesex Regiment (Duke of Cambridge's Own)
- Active: 1881–1966
- Country: United Kingdom
- Branch: British Army
- Type: Infantry
- Role: Line infantry
- Size: 1–4 Regular battalions 1–2 Militia and Special Reserve; 1–7 Territorial and Volunteer battalions
- Garrison/HQ: Hounslow Barracks (1881–1905); Inglis Barracks, Mill Hill (1905–1966)
- Nickname: The Die Hards
- Colors: Lemon Yellow Facings
- Anniversaries: Albuhera Day (16 May).

The Middlesex Regiment (Duke of Cambridge's Own) was a line infantry regiment of the British Army in existence from 1881 until 1966. The regiment was formed, as the Duke of Cambridge's Own (Middlesex Regiment), in 1881 as part of the Childers Reforms when the 57th (West Middlesex) and 77th (East Middlesex) Regiments of Foot were amalgamated with the county's militia and rifle volunteer units.

On 31 December 1966 the Middlesex Regiment (Duke of Cambridge's Own) was amalgamated with the other regiments of the Home Counties Brigade, the Queen's Royal Surrey Regiment, the Queen's Own Buffs, The Royal Kent Regiment and the Royal Sussex Regiment to form the Queen's Regiment. The latter merged on 9 September 1992 with the Royal Hampshire Regiment to form the Princess of Wales's Royal Regiment (Queen's and Royal Hampshires).

The Middlesex Regiment was one of the principal home counties based regiments with a long tradition. They inherited their nickname, the "Die-hards", from the 57th Regiment of Foot (West Middlesex), which later became the 1st Battalion, Middlesex Regiment. The 57th gained the name during the Peninsular War when, at the Battle of Albuera on 16 May 1811 their commander Colonel Inglis had his horse shot from under him. Severely wounded and outnumbered by the French he called to his men "Die hard, 57th. Die hard!" "Albuhera" was the principal battle honour on the Middlesex Regiment's colours.

== History ==
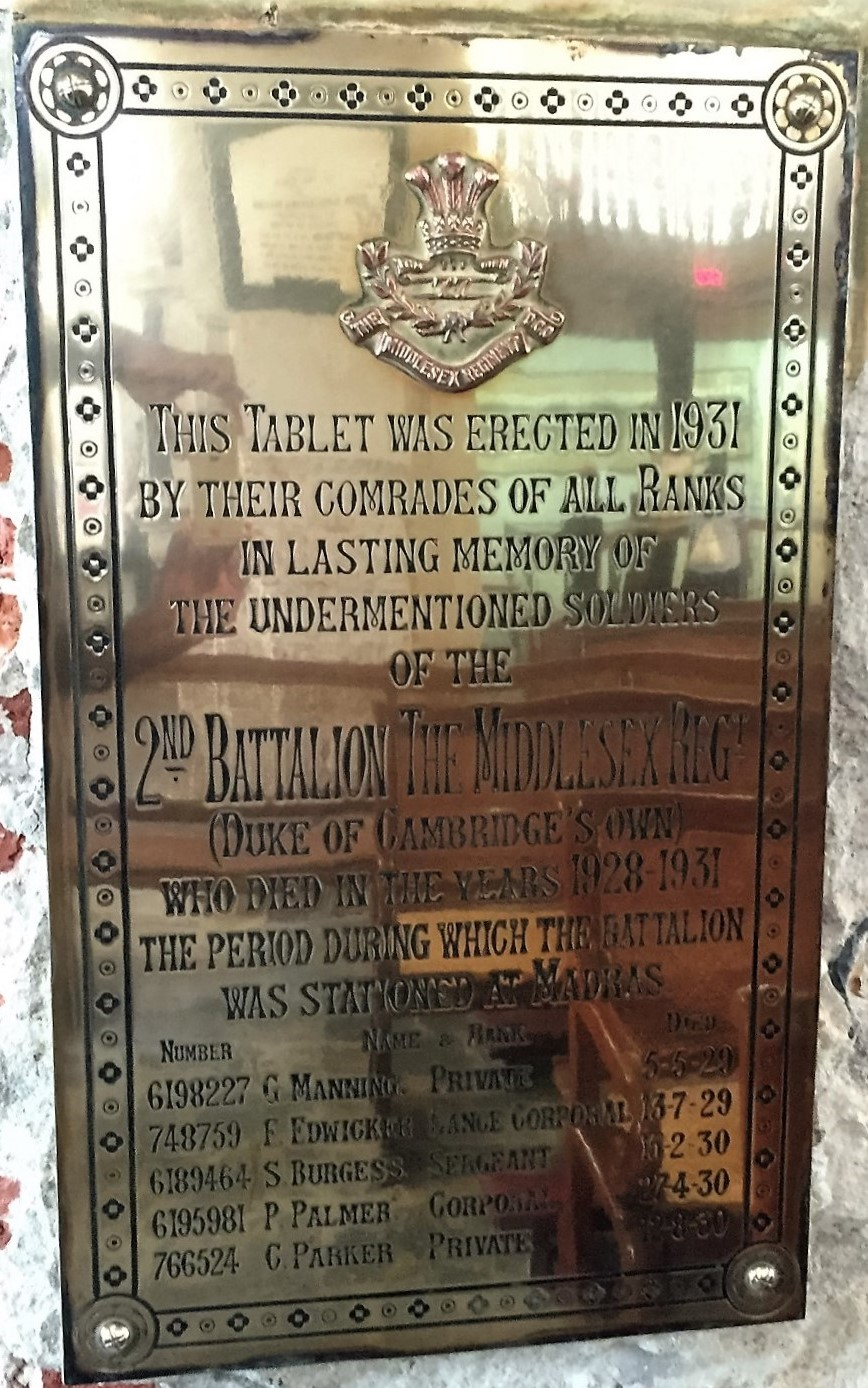
Middlesex Regiment Memorial, St. Mary's Church, Madras

=== Formation ===
The regiment was formed on 1 July 1881 with two regular, two militia and four volunteer battalions:

- 1st Battalion formerly the 57th (West Middlesex) Regiment of Foot (raised 1755)
- 2nd Battalion formerly the 77th (East Middlesex) Regiment of Foot (The Duke of Cambridge's Own) (raised 1787)
- 3rd Battalion formerly the Royal Elthorne Light Infantry Militia
- 4th Battalion formerly the Royal East Middlesex Militia
- 1st Volunteer Battalion formerly The 3rd Middlesex Volunteer Rifle Corps
- 2nd Volunteer Battalion formerly The 8th Middlesex (South West Middlesex) Volunteer Rifle Corps
- 3rd Volunteer Battalion formerly The 11th (Railway) Middlesex Volunteer Rifle Corps – transferred to Royal Fusiliers 1890
- 4th Volunteer Battalion (3rd VB from 1890) formerly the 17th Middlesex (North Middlesex) Volunteer Rifle Corps

In 1900 the number of regular battalions was doubled with the formation of new 3rd and 4th battalions, and the militia battalions were renumbered as the 5th and 6th battalions. In 1908, with the formation of the Special Reserve from the Militia and the Territorial Force (TF) from the Volunteers, the 1st and 2nd Volunteer Battalions became the 7th and 8th (TF) Battalions, while the 3rd (formerly 4th) Volunteer Battalion transferred to the London Regiment, becoming the 19th Battalion (St Pancras). The 4th Volunteer Battalion, King's Royal Rifle Corps (formerly the 5th (West Middlesex) Volunteer Rifle Corps), joined the Middlesex Regiment as the 9th Battalion. The 10th Battalion was formed by a nucleus of 300 officers and men from the disbanded 2nd (South Middlesex) Volunteer Rifle Corps. The regiment now had two Special Reserve and four Territorial battalions. The four TF battalions constituted the Middlesex Brigade in the Home Counties Division.

=== Duke of Cambridge's Own ===
On formation in 1881 the regimental title was The Duke of Cambridge's Own (Middlesex Regiment). The regiment inherited the designation "Duke of Cambridge's Own" from the 77th Foot, to which regiment it had been awarded in 1876. The regiment was also permitted to bear the coronet and cypher of Prince George, Duke of Cambridge on its colours and badges. The regiment had earlier been granted the plumes and motto of the Prince of Wales in 1810 for twenty years service in India.

In 1921, in common with many other regiments, the regimental title was effectively reversed to The Middlesex Regiment (Duke of Cambridge's Own). The Duke was colonel-in-chief of the regiment from 1898 to his death in 1904. Its regimental marches were 'Sir Manley Power' and 'Paddy's Resource' (quick), and 'Caledonian' and 'Garb of old Gaul' (slow).

The regiment relocated from Hounslow Barracks to the newly built Inglis Barracks in 1905.

=== Early service ===
The 1st and 2nd battalions both saw turns in India during the late 19th century. Following the outbreak of the Second Boer War in 1899, the 2nd battalion embarked for active service in South Africa in December 1899 and took part in the storming of Alleman's Nek in June 1900. The battalion stayed in South Africa after the end of the war (June 1902), leaving Cape Town for Southampton on the SS Staffordshire in January 1903.

The 5th and 6th (Militia) battalions were also embodied for active service during the Second Boer War. 760 men of the 5th battalion (formerly the Royal Elthorne Light Infantry) was reported to return home on the SS Assaye in September 1902, after the war had ended. The 6th battalion (formerly the Royal East Middlesex Militia) was embodied in December 1899 (when it was still the 4th Battalion), and 530 officers and men left for service in South Africa in February 1900.

=== First World War ===
==== Regular army ====
The 1st Battalion landed at Le Havre, as line of communication troops, in August 1914 for service on the Western Front.

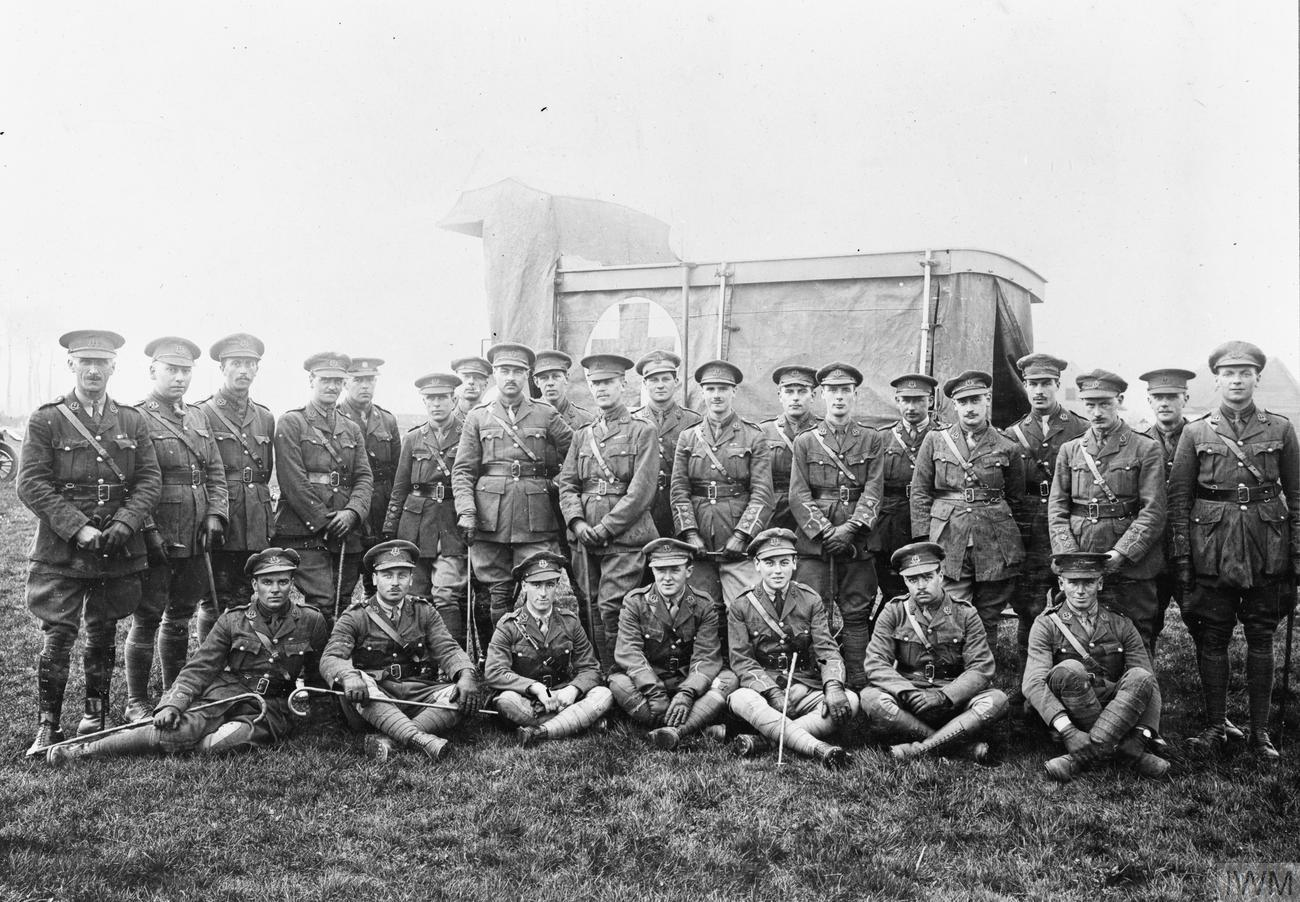
Lieutenant-Colonel John Hamilton Hall (standing directly in front of the Red Cross on the ambulance), the CO of the 1st Battalion, Middlesex Regiment (98th Brigade, 33rd Division), with his officers. Photograph taken during the battalion's rest near Cassel, 25 April 1918.

The 2nd Battalion landed at Le Havre as part of the 23rd Brigade in the 8th Division in November 1914 also for service on the Western Front.

The 3rd Battalion landed at Le Havre as part of the 85th Brigade in the 28th Division in January 1915 for service on the Western Front before moving to Egypt in October 1915 and to Salonika in December 1915.

The 4th Battalion land at Boulogne-sur-Mer as part of the 8th Brigade in 3rd Division in August 1914 for service on the Western Front. Some 400 men of the 4th Battalion were killed at the Battle of Mons later that month.

==== Territorial force ====
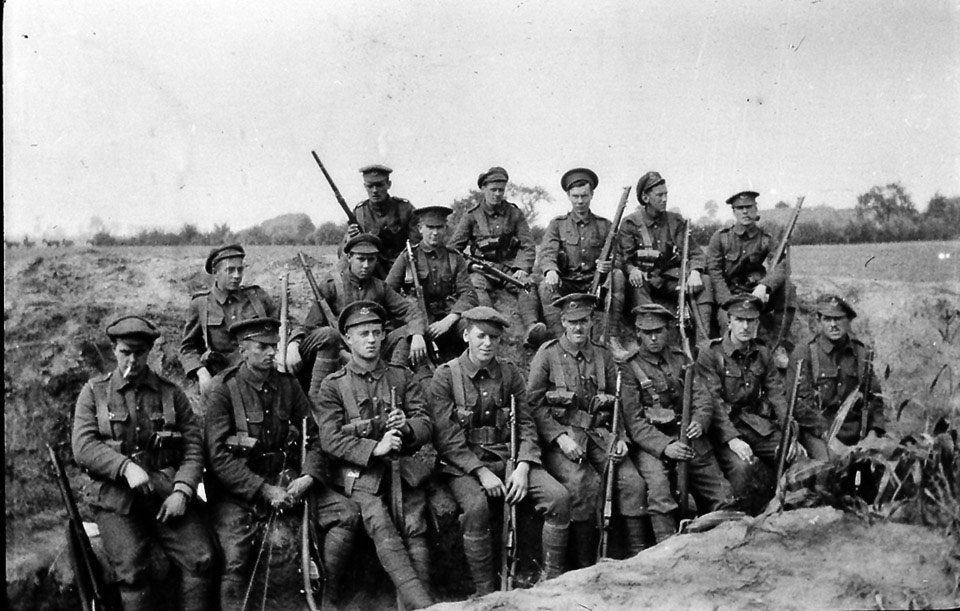
Men of the 1/7th Battalion, Duke of Cambridge's Own (Middlesex Regiment), 1915.

At the start of the First World War the four territorial battalions were sent off to their war stations: the 1/7th and 1/8th, who went to France to serve on the Western Front, and the 1/9th and 1/10th, who went to India to relieve regular troops. Late in 1917 the 1/9th Bn was assigned to the 18th Indian Division and served in the Mesopotamian Campaign in 1918. However, there was a surplus of volunteers who had sought to enlist; these men had joined the Territorial Battalions, and although the War Office wanted them to transfer to the Regular Army or the New (Kitchener's Army), the majority elected to remain with the Territorial Battalions which had enlisted them. General Kitchener was not in favour of the Territorials although he and other critics were silenced after the Territorials fought so well with the BEF after Mons. It became obvious that the First Line battalions that had gone overseas would need reinforcements almost at once and the War Office gave permission to raise Second Line Territorial Battalions and in this way the 2/7th and 2/8th were formed for service with the Western Frontier Force and the 2/10th was formed for service in the Gallipoli Campaign. A Third Line battalion, the 3/10th, also landed at Le Havre for service on the Western Front.

==== New armies ====
Additional war-formed "service" battalions were the 11th to 34th and 51st to 53rd. Two of these Battalions (17th and 23rd) were recruited from footballers and were known as the Football Battalions. In October 1966 the regiment paid a then record sum of £900 for the Victoria Cross awarded to Private Robert Edward Ryder, of the 12th (Service) Battalion, for bravery during the Battle of the Somme.

==== Labour units ====
The 1916 introduction of conscription saw the 30th and 31st (Works) battalions raised to accommodate British citizens who were the sons of enemy aliens. These were non-combatant units that provided labour to support the British war effort. From 1917 to 1918 eight independent companies of the Middlesex Regiment were additionally raised to provide labourers for service in France.

=== Inter-war period ===
In the early 1920s the 3rd and 4th battalions were disbanded, leaving two regular battalions. The 7th and 8th territorial battalions continued in existence, while the 9th was converted to a searchlight unit, transferring to the Royal Artillery in 1940 as 60th (Middlesex) Searchlight Regiment, and the 10th became a unit of the Royal Signals as 44th (Home Counties) Divisional Signals. In 1916, the Post Office Rifles, the Princess Louise's Kensington Regiment and 19th Battalion, London Regiment (St Pancras) had been attached to the Middlesex Regiment from the territorial London Regiment, but retained their original titles and distinctions. In 1935 the Post Office Rifles and 19th Londons became searchlight regiments, and in 1937 The Kensingtons formally became a territorial battalion of the Middlesex Regiment.

=== Second World War ===
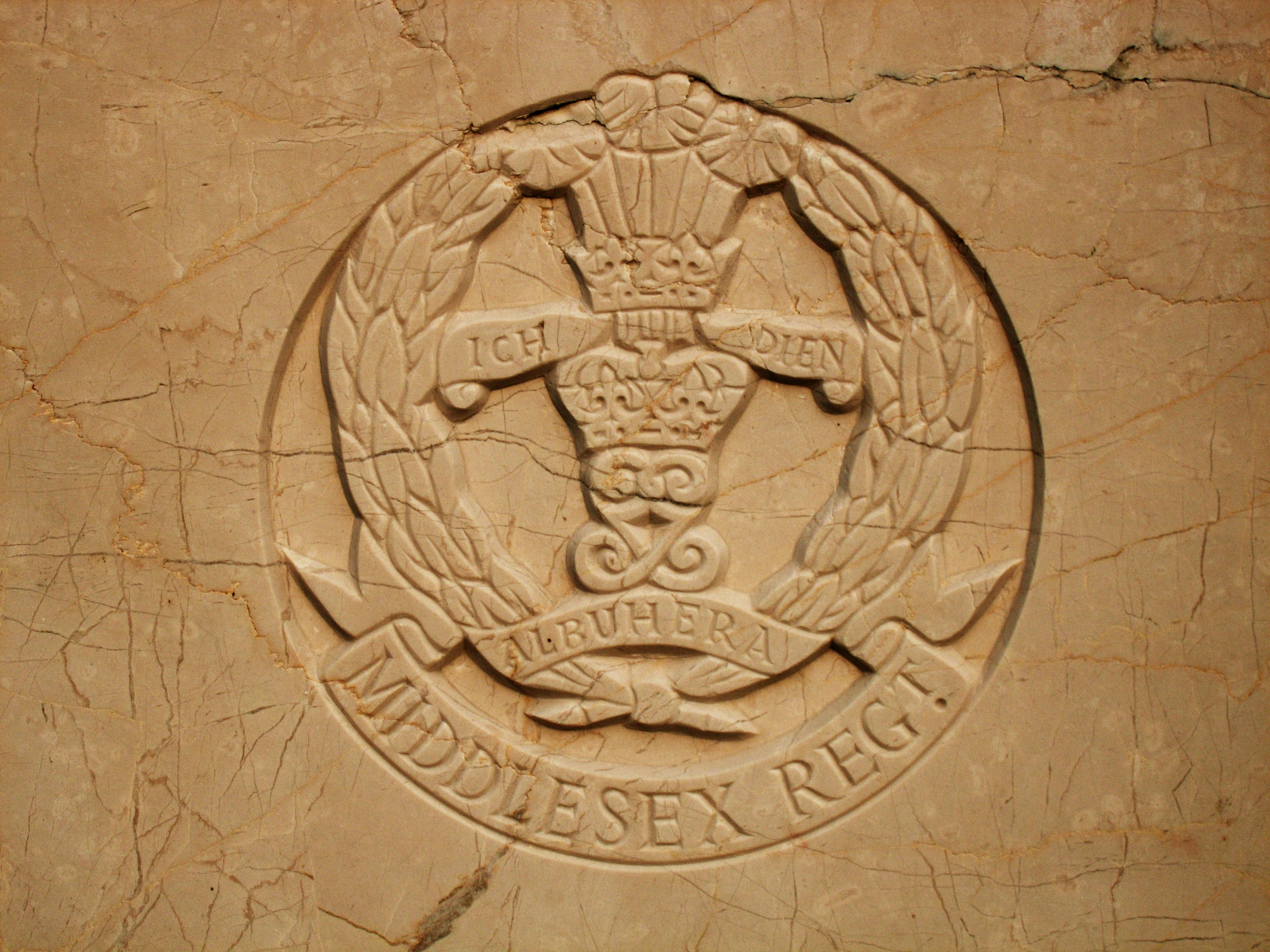
Badge of the Middlesex Regiment as shown on a Second World War grave at Stanley Military Cemetery, Hong Kong.

Before the Second World War the Middlesex Regiment was chosen as one of four infantry regiments to be converted to a machine gun regiment. The 1/7th Battalion served with the 51st (Highland) Infantry Division.

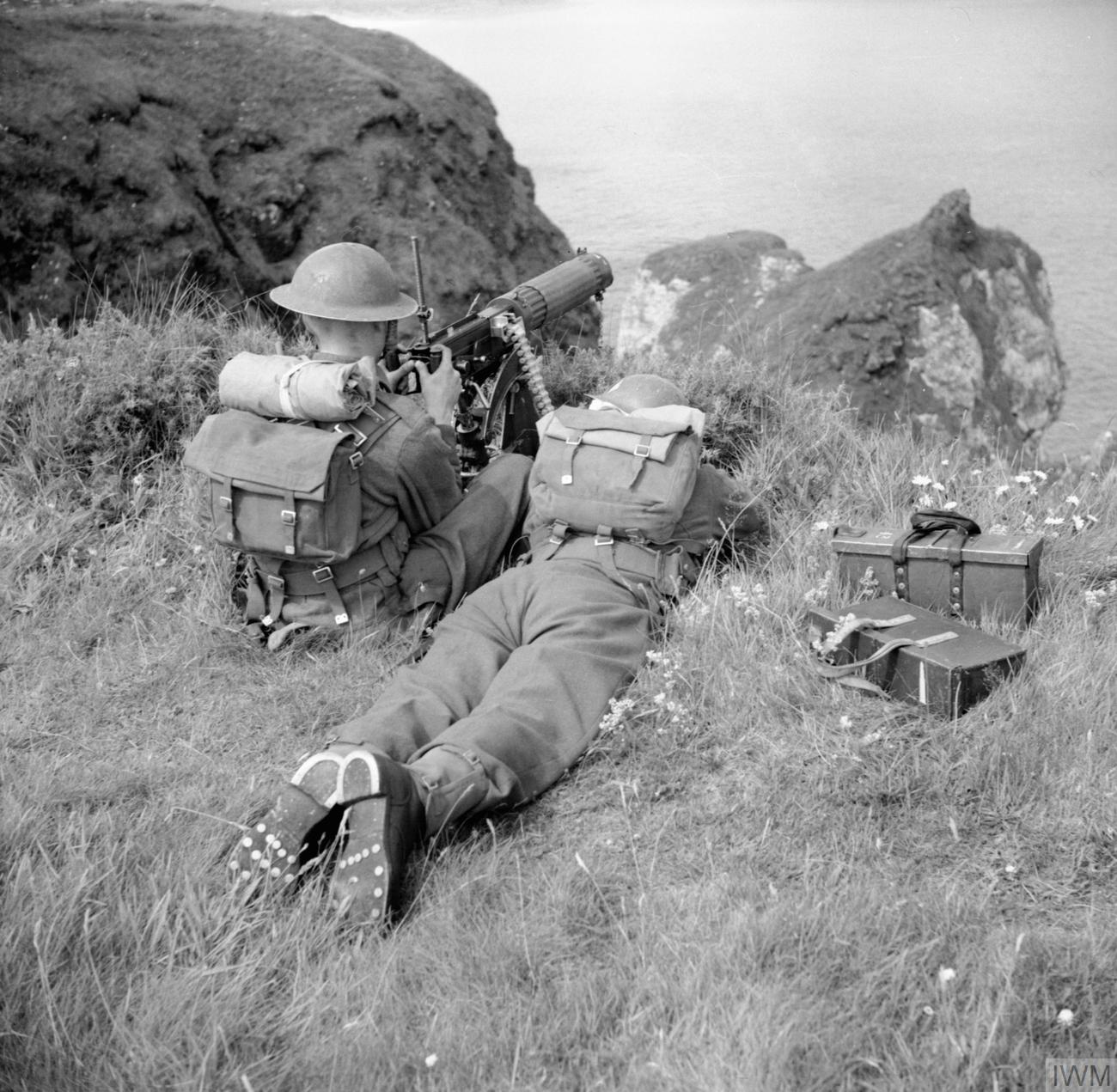
Vickers machine-gun team of 2/8th Battalion, Middlesex Regiment, man their weapon on a clifftop in Northern Ireland, 15 July 1941.

In 1943, the 1/8th officially became the 8th Battalion as part of the MG Battalion attached to the 43rd (Wessex) Infantry Division during the Normandy Campaign during which they fought in the Battle for Caen.

At the outbreak of War, the 1st Bn was part of the Hong Kong Infantry Brigade. It was still part of the garrison in December 1941 when the Japanese invaded and saw action part in the defence of the colony during the 17 days leading up the surrender of Hong Kong on 25 December, 1941.

=== Post-war to amalgamation ===
The regiment was reduced to a single regular battalion (the 1st) in 1948, and two territorial battalions (the 7th and 8th). The Kensington Regiment amalgamated with the Middlesex Yeomanry to form the 31st (Greater London) Signal Regiment (V).

In 1948, the 1st battalion became part of the Home Counties Brigade, along with the regular battalions of other regiments in southeast England.

From August 1950 to April 1951, the 1st battalion saw action in the Korean War as part of 27th British Commonwealth Brigade, being one of the first British units to be deployed there.

In 1961 the Territorial Army was reduced in size and a new 5th Battalion was formed by the amalgamation of the 7th and 8th with the 571st Light Anti-Aircraft Regiment, Royal Artillery (the successor to the 9th Battalion).

In 1966 the four battalions of the Home Counties Brigade were amalgamated to form a "large regiment", the Queen's Regiment. Accordingly, the 1st Battalion Middlesex Regiment was redesignated as 4th Battalion the Queen's Regiment (Middlesex), with the other regular battalions being formed by the Queen's Royal Surrey Regiment, Queen's Own Buffs and Royal Sussex Regiment. In 1968 the 'Middlesex' suffix was dropped, and in June 1970 the 4th Battalion was disbanded, with its members distributed among the regiment's three remaining regular battalions.

== Regimental museum ==
The Middlesex Regiment Museum, formerly in Bruce Castle, closed in 1992 and was absorbed into the National Army Museum.

== Battle honours ==
The battle honours of the regiment were as follows:

- Earlier wars
  - Mysore, South Africa 1879, Relief of Ladysmith, South Africa 1900–02
- The Great War
  - Mons, Le Cateau, Retreat from Mons, Marne 1914, Aisne 1914 '18, La Bassée 1914, Messines 1914 '17 '18, Armentières 1914, Neuve Chapelle, Ypres 1915 '17 '18, Gravenstafel, St. Julien, Frezenberg, Bellewaarde, Aubers, Hooge 1915, Loos, Somme 1916 '18, Albert 1916 '18, Bazentin, Delville Wood, Pozières, Ginchy, Flers-Courcelette, Morval, Thiepval, Le Transloy, Ancre Heights, Ancre 1916 '18, Bapaume 1917 '18, Arras 1917 '18, Vimy 1917, Scarpe 1917 '18, Arleux, Pilckem, Langemarck 1917, Menin Road, Polygon Wood, Broodseinde, Poelcappelle, Passchendaele, Cambrai 1917 '18, St. Quentin, Rosières, Avre, Villers Bretonneux, Lys, Estaires, Hazebrouck, Bailleul, Kemmel, Scherpenberg, Hindenburg Line, Canal du Nord, St. Quentin Canal, Courtrai, Selle, Valenciennes, Sambre, France and Flanders 1914–18, Italy1917-18, Struma, Doiran 1918, Macedonia 1915–18, Suvla, Landing at Suvla, Scimitar Hill, Gallipoli 1915, Rumani, Egypt 1915–17, Gaza, Jerusalem, Jericho, Jordan, Tell 'Asur, Palestine 1917–18, Mesopotamia 1917–18, Murman 1919, Dukhovskaya, Siberia 1918–19
- The Second World War:
  - Dyle, Defence of Escaut, Ypres-Comines Canal, Dunkirk 1940, Normandy Landing, Cambes, Breville, Odon, Caen, Orne, Hill 112, Bourguébus Ridge, Troarn, Mont Pincon, Falaise, Seine 1944, Nederrijn, Le Havre, Lower Maas, Venraij, Meijel, Geilenkirchen, Venlo Pocket, Rhineland, Reichswald, Goch, Rhine, Lingen, Brinkum, Bremen, North-West Europe 1940 '44–45, El Alamein, Advance on Tripoli, Mareth, Akarit, Djebel Roumana, North Africa 1942–43, Francofonte, Sferro, Sferro Hills, Sicily 1943, Anzio, Carroceto, Gothic Line, Monte Grande, Italy 1944–45, Hong Kong, South-East Asia 1941
- Later wars
  - Naktong Bridgehead, Chongju, Chongchon II Chuam-Ni, Kapyong-chon, Kapyong, Korea 1950–51, 7th, 8th, 9th Battal

== Colonels-in-chief ==
- 1898–1904: F.M. HRH George William Frederick Charles, 2nd Duke of Cambridge, KG, KT, KP, GCB, GCSI, GCMG, GCIE, GCVO, GBE, VD, TD (Commander in Chief)
- 1921–: F.M. HM King Edward VIII

== Regimental colonels ==
Colonels of the regiment were:

The Duke of Cambridge's Own (Middlesex Regiment)

- 1881 (1st Battalion): Gen. Sir Edward Alan Holdich, GCB (ex 57th Foot)
- 1881 (2nd Battalion): Gen. Henry Hope Graham, CB (ex 77th Foot)
- 1897–1900: Gen. Sir George Harry Smith Willis, GCB
- 1900–1921: Lt-Gen. Henry Kent

The Middlesex Regiment (Duke of Cambridge's Own) (1921)

- 1921–1932: Gen. Sir Ivor Maxse, KCB, CVO, DSO
- 1932–1942: Brig-Gen. Ronald Macclesfield Heath, CMG, DSO
- 1942–1952: Col. Maurice Browne, MC
- 1952–1959: Lt-Gen. Gerard Corfield Bucknall, CB, MC
- 1959–1965: Maj-Gen. Sir John Edward Francis Willoughby, KBE, CB
- 1965–1966: Maj-Gen. Christopher Mark Morrice Man, CB, OBE, MC
- 1966: Regiment amalgamated with The Queen's Royal Surrey Regiment, Queen's Own Buffs, The Royal Kent Regiment and The Royal Sussex Regiment to form The Queen's Regiment

== Freedoms ==
The regiment was awarded the Freedom of Hendon on 22 October 1955.

== Uniforms ==
The regimental facings were yellow lapels and cuffs on the standard infantry red coats of the period, from the establishment of the 59th Regiment of Foot in 1755 and its renumbering as the 57th two years later. When linked with the 77th Regiment in 1881, white facings were adopted by the two battalions now making up the Duke of Cambridge's Own (Middleex Regiment. Coincidentally the 77th had also worn yellow facings until the merger. In 1902 the entire regiment adopted lemon-yellow of a distinctive shade associated with the 77th until 1820. The remaining features of the Middlesex Regiment's uniform followed the normal British infantry changes from red coats, to scarlet tunics, to khaki service dress and battle dress. Braid, badges, and buttons were gold or bronze.

== Alliances ==
- New Zealand – The Taranaki Regiment (1913-1948)
- New Zealand – The Wellington West Coast and Taranaki Regiment (1948-1966)

== Sources ==
- Beckett, Ian (2003). Discovering English County Regiments. Shire. ISBN 978-0747805069.
- Joslen, Lt-Col H.F. (2003). Orders of Battle: Second World War, 1939–1945. Uckfield: Naval and Military Press. ISBN 978-1-84342-474-1.
