= 49th Battalion (Edmonton Regiment), CEF =

49th Battalion, CEF
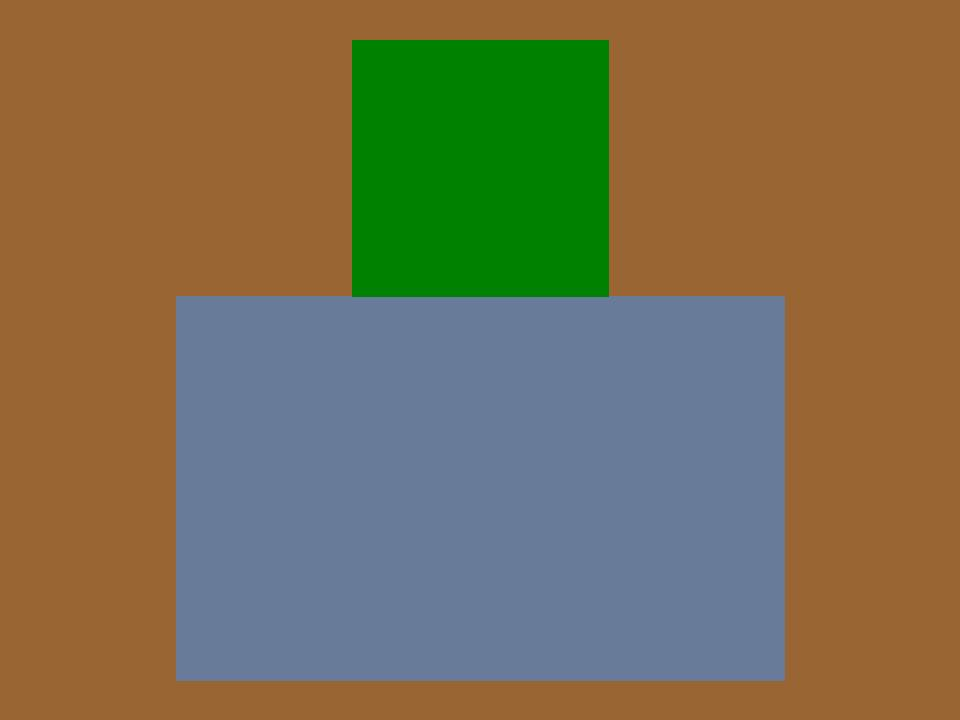
- Distinguishing patch of the 49th Battalion, CEF
- Active: 1914–1920
- Disbanded: 1920
- Country: Canada
- Branch: Canadian Expeditionary Force
- Type: Infantry
- Part of: 7th Infantry Brigade, 3rd Canadian Division
- Battle honours: Mount Sorrel; Somme, 1916; Flers–Courcelette; Ancre Heights; Arras, 1917, '18; Vimy, 1917; Hill 70; Ypres, 1917; Passchendaele; Amiens; Scarpe, 1918; Hindenburg Line; Canal du Nord; Pursuit to Mons; France and Flanders, 1915–18

Commanders
- Notable commanders: William Antrobus Griesbach

The 49th Battalion (Edmonton Regiment), CEF, was an infantry battalion of the Canadian Expeditionary Force during the Great War.

== History ==
The 49th Battalion was authorized on 7 November 1914 and embarked for Great Britain on 3 June 1915. It disembarked in France on 9 October 1915, where it fought as part of the 7th Infantry Brigade, 3rd Canadian Division in France and Flanders until the end of the war. The battalion was disbanded on 15 September 1920.

The Battalion's newspaper, The Forty-Niner, was founded while the Battalion had not yet embarked for France and continued throughout the war.

The 49th Battalion recruited in and was mobilized at Edmonton, Alberta.

The 49th Battalion had four commanding officers:

- Lieutenant-Colonel William Antrobus Griesbach, DSO, 4 June 1915 – 11 February 1917
- Lieutenant-Colonel R.H. Palmer, DSO, 14 February 1917 – 1 July 1918
- Lieutenant-Colonel C.Y. Weaver, DSO, 1 July 1918 – 1 October 1918
- Lieutenant-Colonel R.H. Palmer, DSO, 2 October 1918 – demobilization

Pte Cecil John Kinross, VC, of the 49th Battalion (Edmonton Regiment), CEF.

Two members of the 49th Battalion were awarded the Victoria Cross. Private John Chipman Kerr for his actions on 16 September 1916 during the Battle of Flers–Courcelette, France and Private Cecil John Kinross for his actions on 30 October 1917 during the Battle of Passchendaele.

== Battle honours ==
The 49th Battalion was awarded the following battle honours:

- Mount Sorrel
- Somme, 1916
- Flers–Courcelette
- Ancre Heights
- Arras, 1917, '18
- Vimy, 1917
- Hill 70
- Ypres, 1917
- Passchendaele
- Amiens
- Scarpe, 1918
- Hindenburg Line
- Canal du Nord
- Pursuit to Mons
- France and Flanders, 1915–18

== Perpetuation ==
The 49th Battalion (Edmonton Regiment), CEF, is perpetuated by The Loyal Edmonton Regiment (4th Battalion, Princess Patricia's Canadian Light Infantry).

== See also ==
- List of infantry battalions in the Canadian Expeditionary Force

== Sources ==
- Canadian Expeditionary Force 1914–1919 by Col. G.W.L. Nicholson, CD, Queen's Printer, Ottawa, Ontario, 1962
