= Cecil John Kinross =

Recipient of the Victoria Cross (1896–1957)

Cecil John Kinross VC
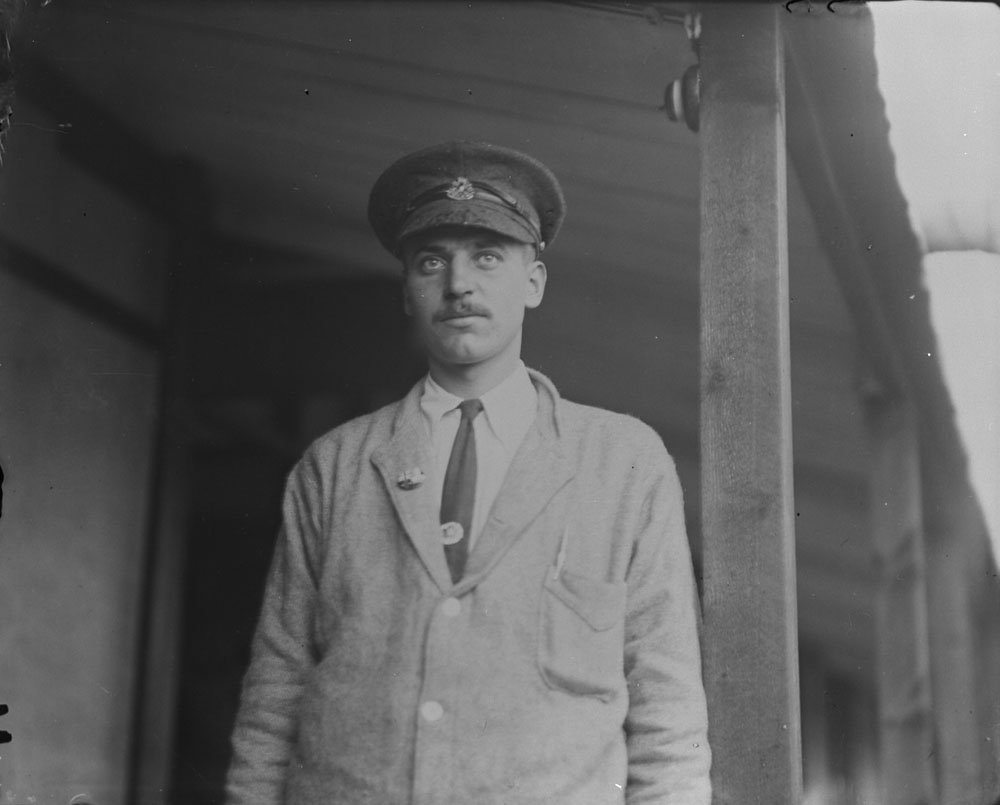
- Born: 17 February 1896; Harefield, Middlesex, England
- Died: 21 June 1957 (aged 61); Lougheed, Alberta, Canada
- Burial place: Lougheed Cemetery
- Military career
- Allegiance: Canada
- Branch: Canadian Expeditionary Force
- Service years: 1915–1919
- Rank: Private
- Units: 49th (Edmonton) Battalion
- Conflicts: World War I
- Awards: Victoria Cross

Cecil John Kinross VC (17 February 1896 – 21 June 1957) was a Canadian soldier in World War I. Kinross was a recipient of the Victoria Cross, the highest and most prestigious award for gallantry in the face of the enemy that can be awarded to British and Commonwealth forces.

== Early life ==
Kinross was born on 17 February 1896 at Dews Farm, Harefield, Middlesex. His father's family originated in Perthshire. He moved to Lougheed, Alberta with his parents and siblings in 1912.

== Military career ==
Kinross volunteered in Calgary, Alberta, on 21 October 1915, as a private in the 49th (Edmonton) Battalion, Canadian Expeditionary Force. On 30 October 1917, at the Battle of Passchendaele during the First World War, Kinross performed an act of bravery for which he was awarded the Victoria Cross.

No. 437793 Private Cecil John Kinross, Can. Inf.

For the most conspicuous bravery in action during prolonged and severe operations.

Shortly after the attack (on Passchendaele Ridge) was launched, the company to which he belonged came under intense artillery fire, and further advance was held up by a very severe fire from an enemy machine gun. Private Kinross, making a careful survey of the situation, deliberately divested himself of all his equipment save his rifle and bandolier and, regardless of his personal safety, advanced alone over the open ground in broad daylight, charged the enemy machine gun, killing the crew of six, and seized and destroyed the gun. His superb example and courage instilled the greatest confidence in his company, and enabled a further advance of 300 yards to be made and a highly important position to be established.

Kinross was wounded in the arm and head in 1917 and hospitalised in Orpington, England. He was subsequently presented with the Victoria Cross by King George V in March 1918.

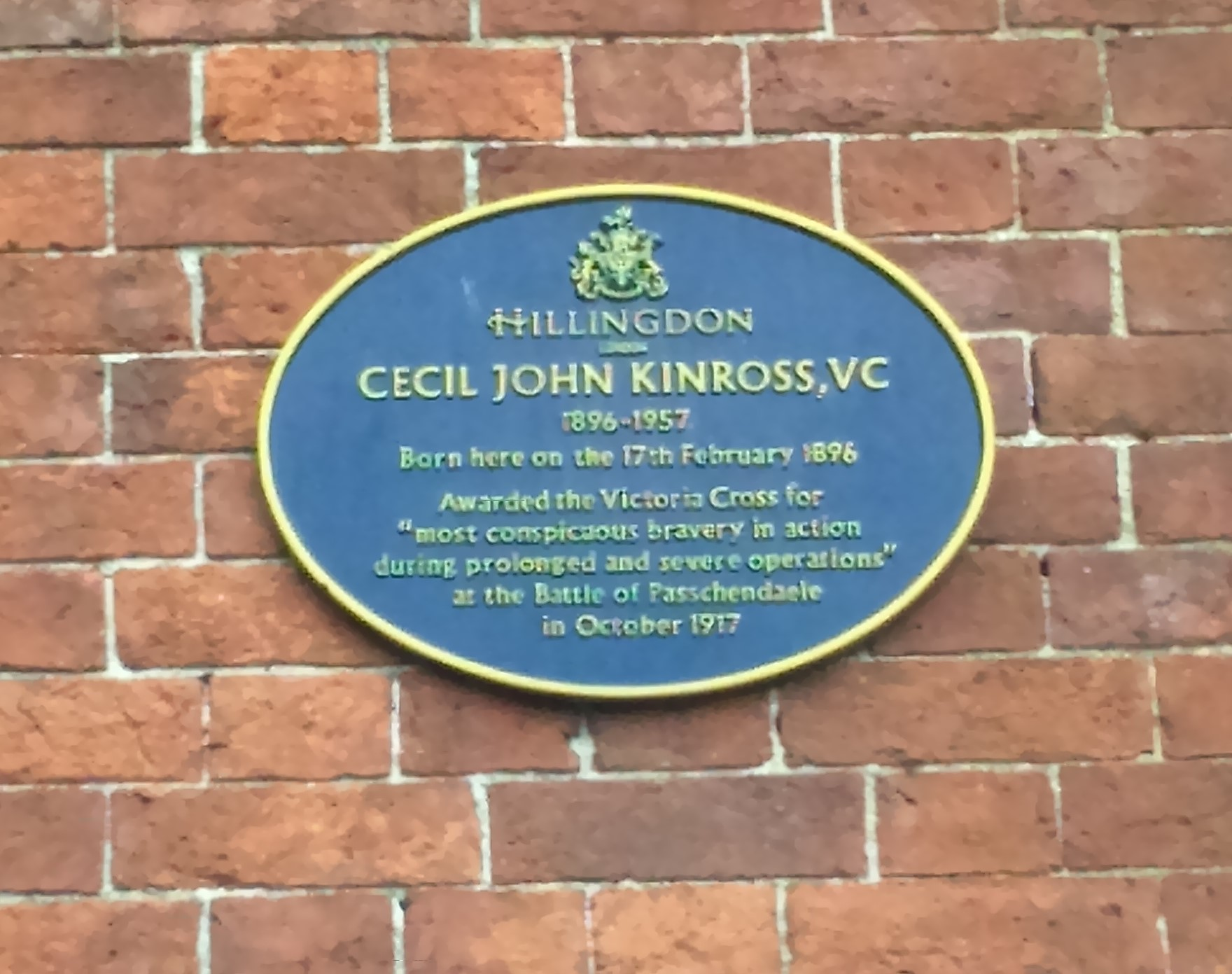
Blue plaque at the birthplace of Kinross

== Later life ==
Kinross returned to Alberta after the war and was given a plot of land in Lougheed. He never married and died at the Lougheed Hotel in on 21 June 1957. He is buried in the Soldier's Plot in Lougheed.

== Legacy ==
Mount Kinross, 2560m, 24 km NW of Jasper, Alberta, in the Victoria Cross Ranges in Jasper National Park, was named after him in 1951.

His Victoria Cross medal is held by his family while the miniature is on display at The Loyal Edmonton Regiment Military Museum in Edmonton, Alberta.

== Bibliography ==
- Ross, Graham (1995). Scotland's Forgotten Valour. MacLean Press. ISBN 978-1899272006.
- Snelling, Stephen (2012) [1998]. Passchendaele 1917. VCs of the First World War. The History Press. ISBN 978-0752476667.
