= Cairngorm (Alberta) =

Mountain in Alberta, Canada

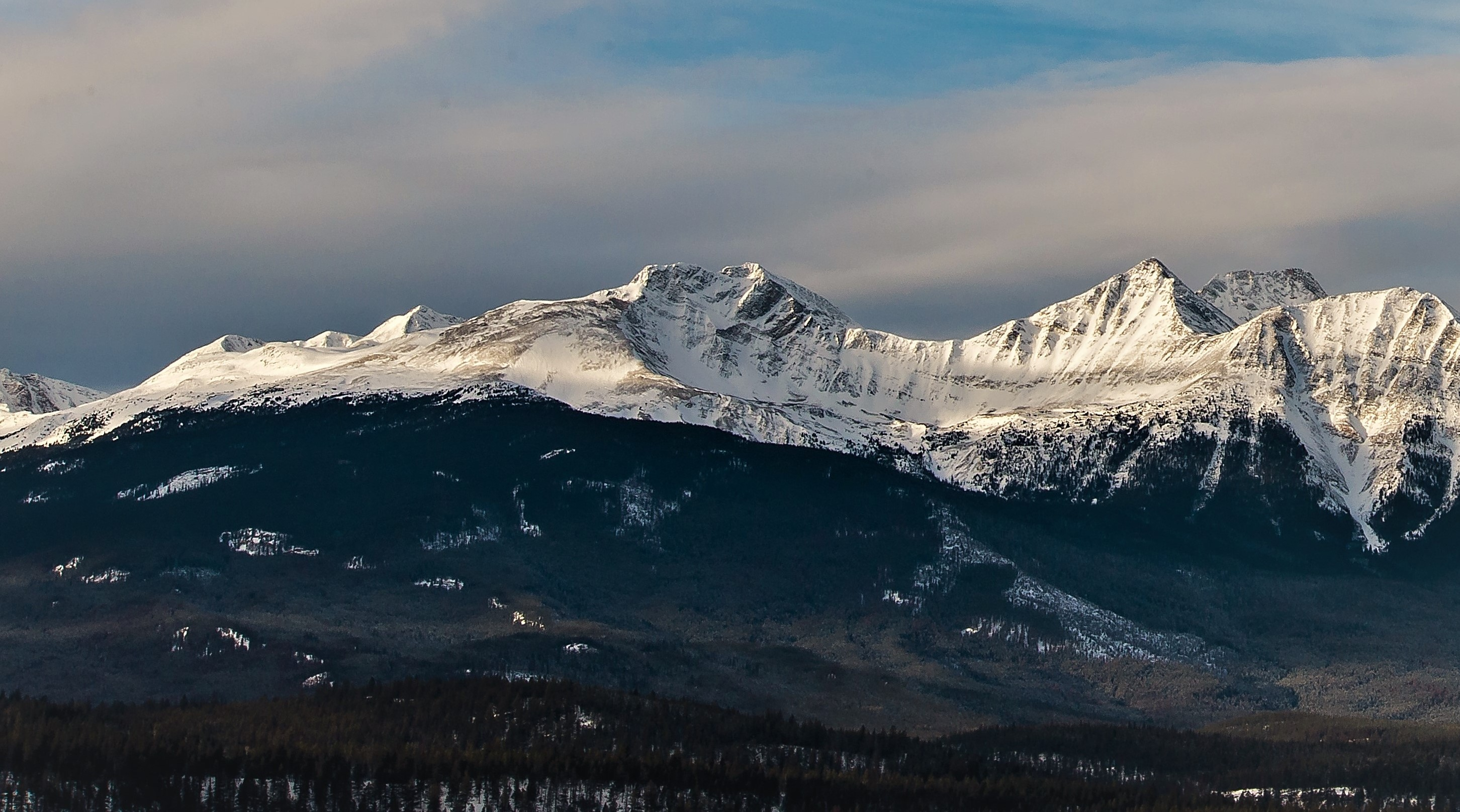
- Southeast aspect, centered

Highest point
- Elevation: 2,610 m (8,563 ft)
- Prominence: 230 m (755 ft)
- Isolation: 1.61 km (1.00 mi)
- Listing: Mountains of Alberta
- Coordinates: 52°55′59″N 118°11′27″W

Geography
- Location within Alberta Location within Canada
- Interactive map of Cairngorm
- Country: Canada
- Province: Alberta
- Protected area: Jasper National Park
- Parent range: Victoria Cross Ranges; Canadian Rockies
- Topo map: NTS 83D16 Jasper

Cairngorm is a 2,610-metre (8,563 ft) mountain located in Alberta, Canada.

== Description ==
Cairngorm is set within Jasper National Park, in the Victoria Cross Ranges of the Canadian Rockies. The town of Jasper is situated 10 kilometres (6.2 mi) to the southeast and Pyramid Mountain is 3.45 kilometres (2.14 mi) to the northeast. The peak is composed of sedimentary rock laid down from the Precambrian to the Jurassic periods which was pushed east and over the top of younger rock during the Laramide orogeny. Precipitation runoff from Cairngorm drains into tributaries of the Miette, Snaring and Athabasca rivers. Topographic relief is modest as the summit rises 1,430 meters (4,690 feet) above Pyramid Lake in six kilometers (3.7 miles).

== History ==
The mountain was named in 1916 by Morrison P. Bridgland after the Cairngorms, a mountain range in the Scottish Highlands associated with the mountain Cairn Gorm. Bridgland (1878–1948), was a Dominion Land Surveyor who named many peaks in Jasper Park and the Canadian Rockies. The mountain's toponym was officially adopted February 7, 1951, by the Geographical Names Board of Canada.

== Climate ==
Based on the Köppen climate classification, Cairngorm is located in a subarctic climate zone with cold, snowy winters, and mild summers. Winter temperatures can drop below −20 °C (−4 °F) with wind chill factors below −30 °C (−22 °F).

== Gallery ==
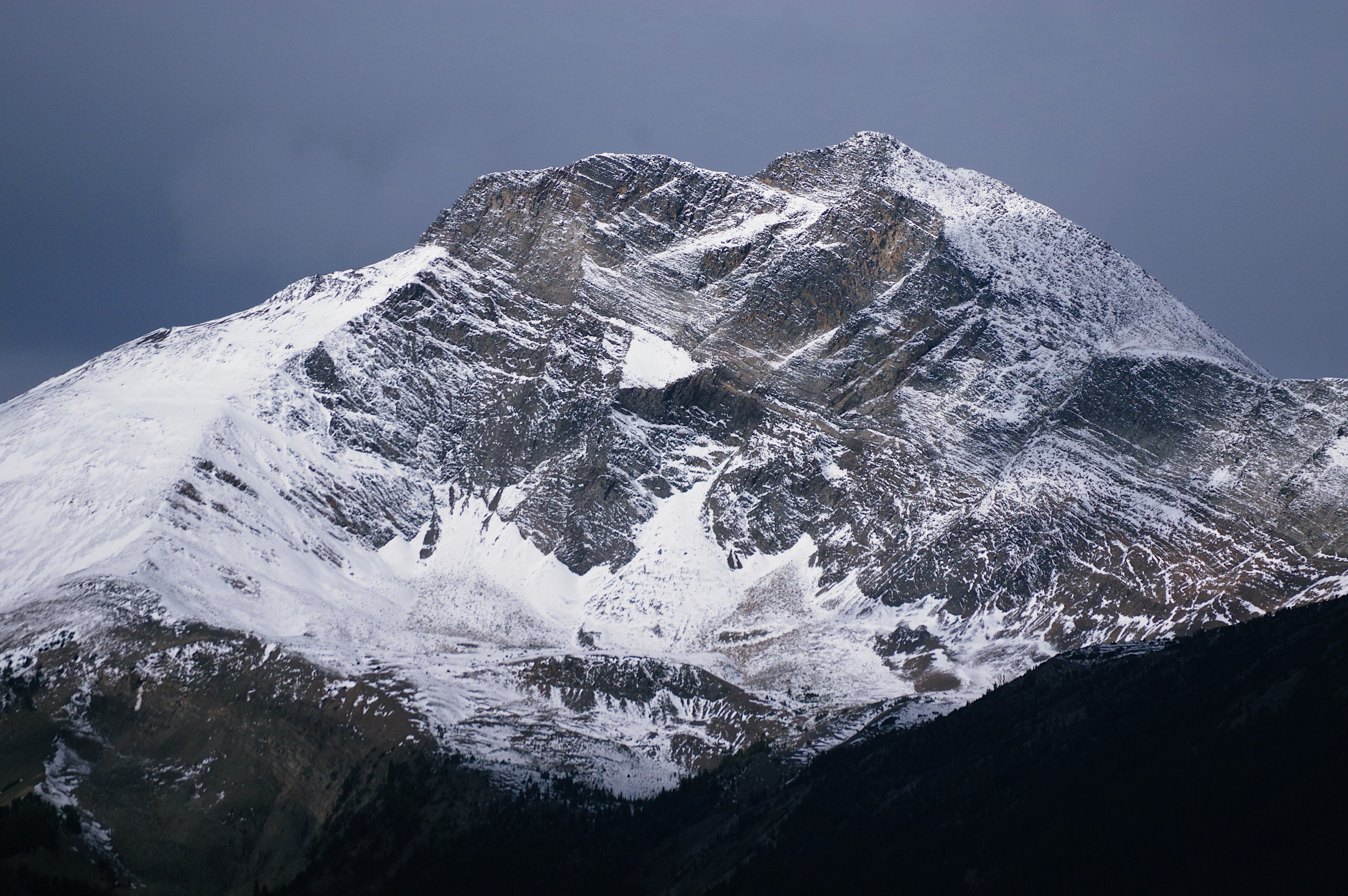
East aspect

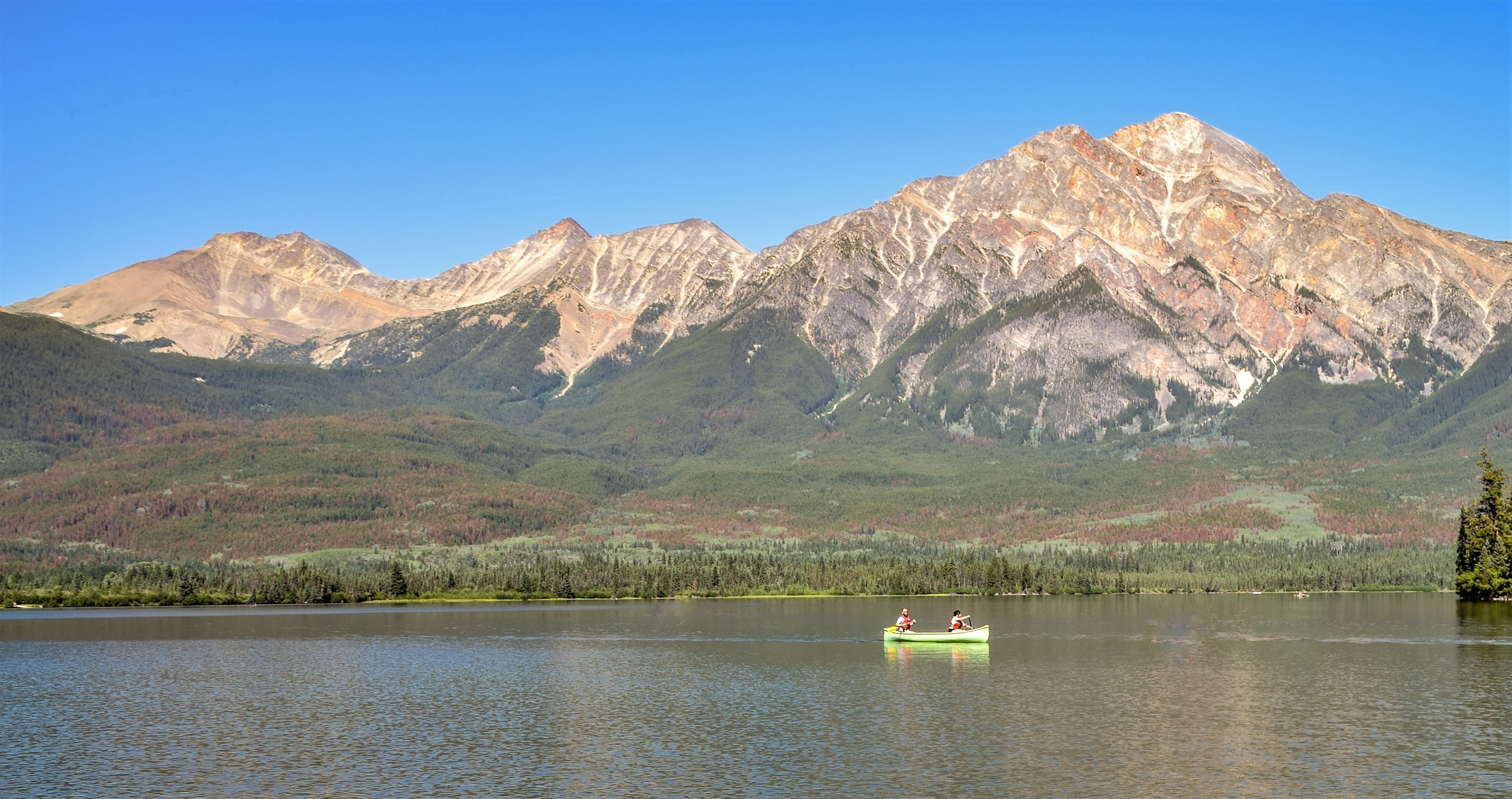
Cairngorm (left) and Pyramid Mountain (right) from Patricia Lake

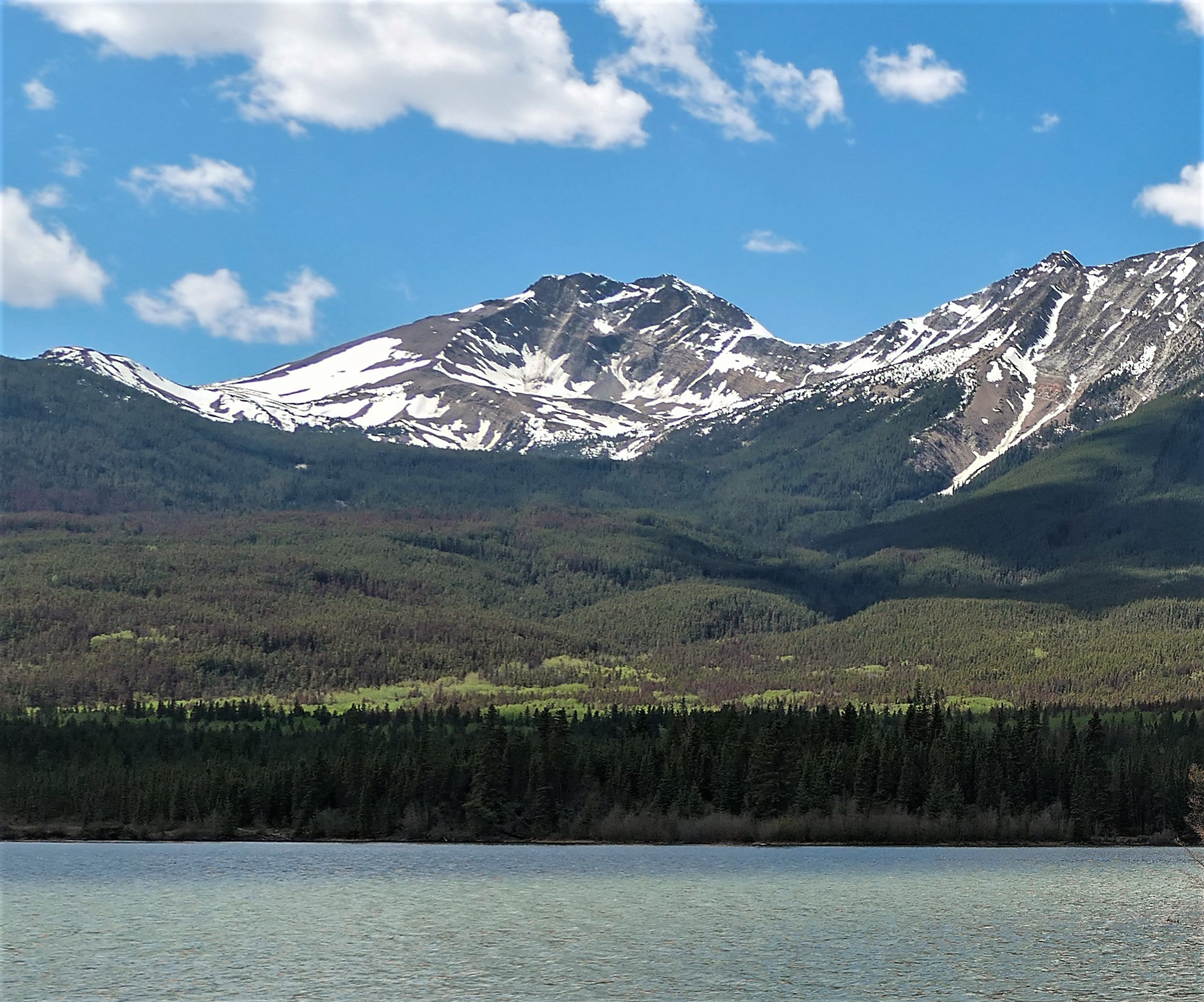
Cairngorm seen from Pyramid Lake

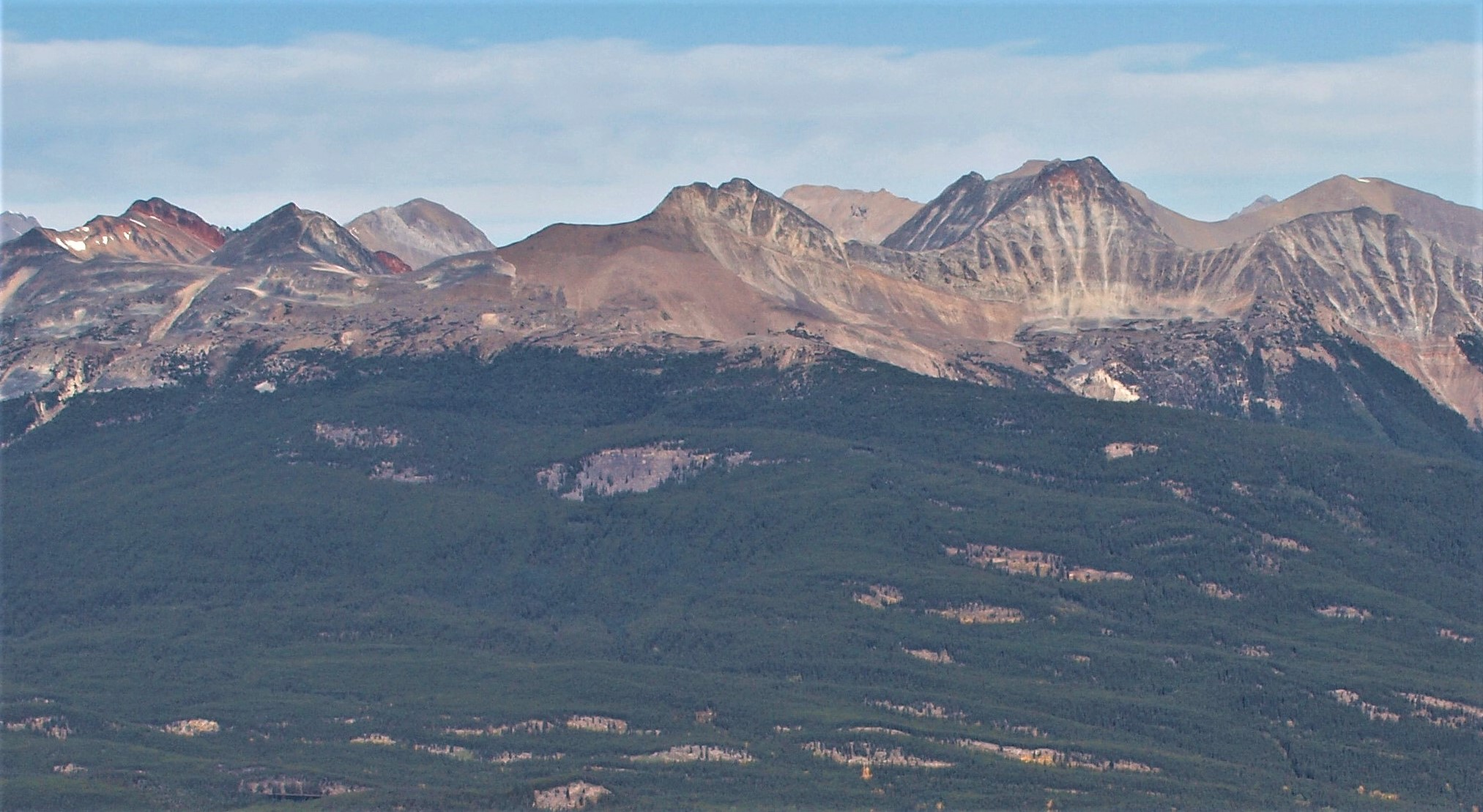
Cairngorm (center) viewed from The Whistlers

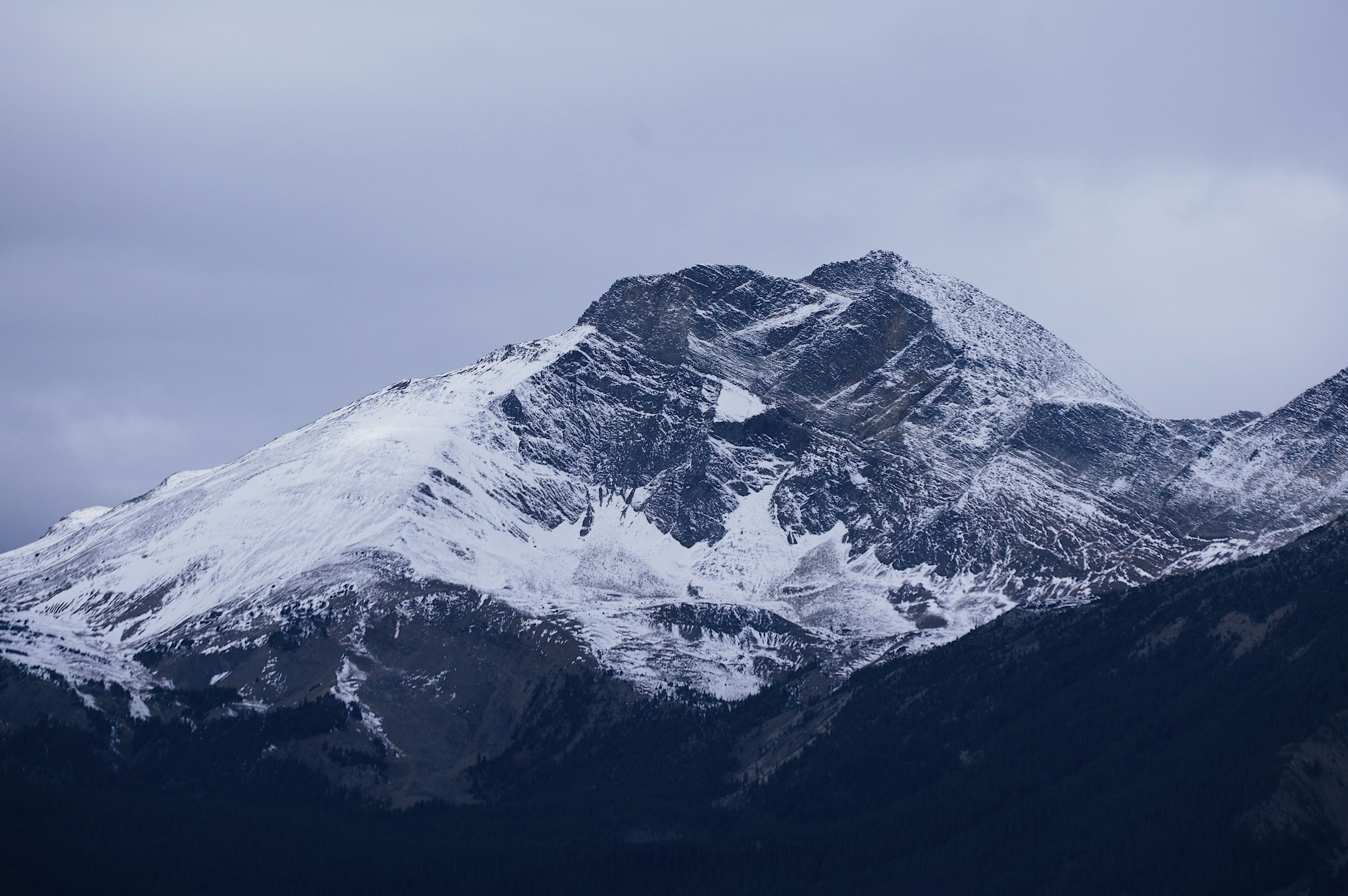
East aspect

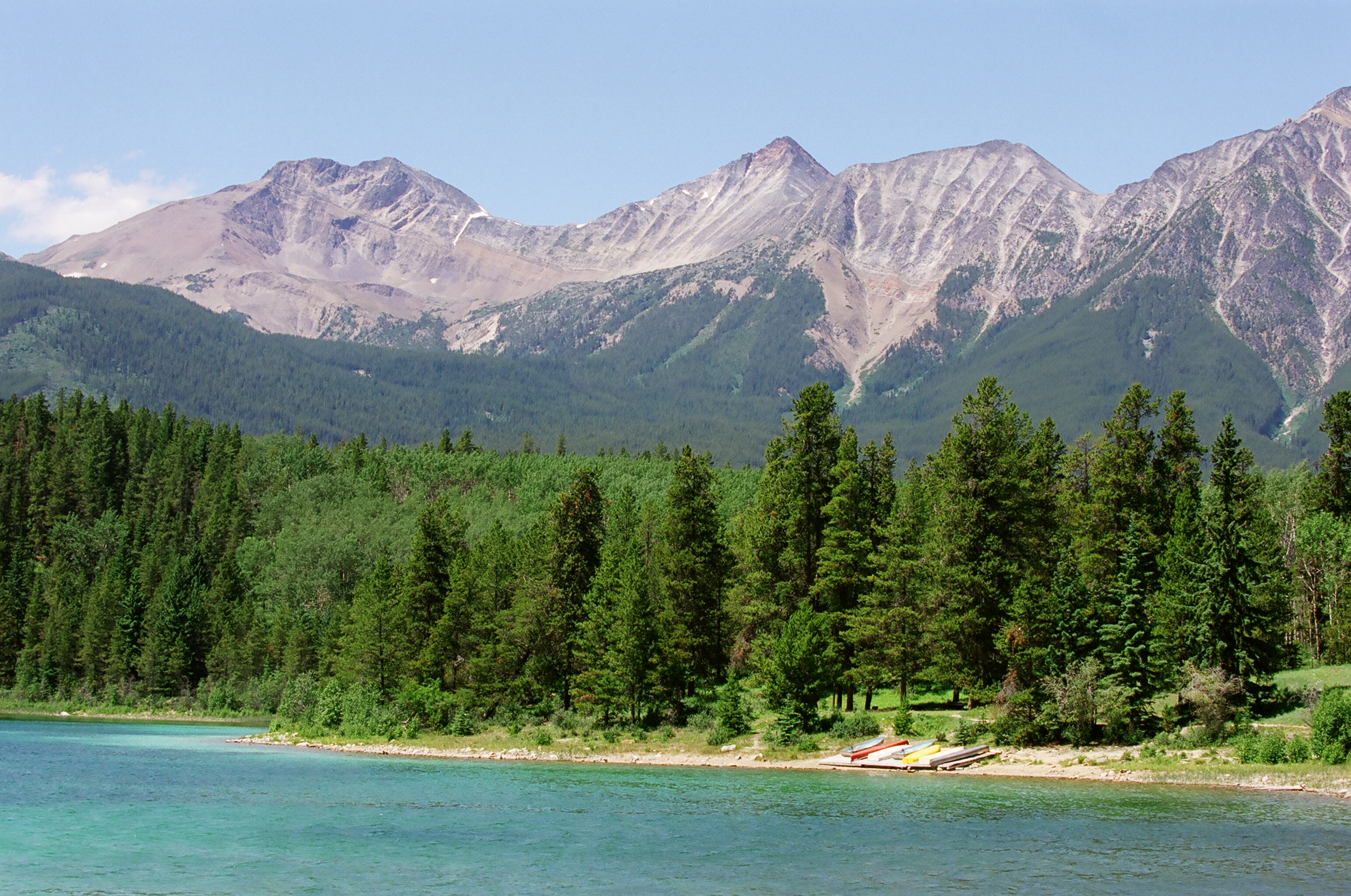
Cairngorm (left) from Patricia Lake

== See also ==
- Geography of Alberta
