= Monarch Mountain (Alberta) =

Mountain in Alberta, Canada

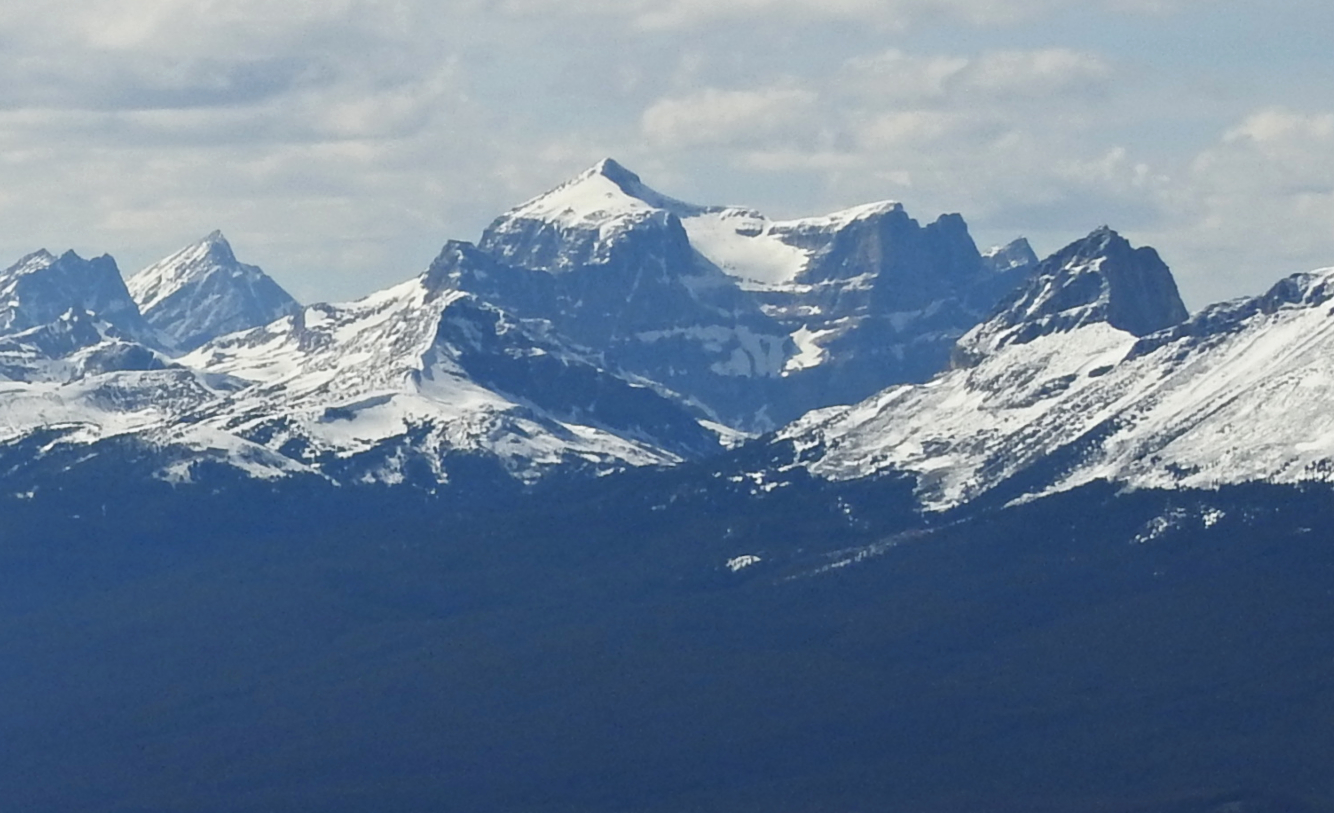
- Monarch Mountain seen from The Whistlers

Highest point
- Elevation: 2,777 m (9,111 ft)
- Prominence: 577 m (1,893 ft)
- Parent peak: Mount Knight (2906 m)
- Listing: Mountains of Alberta
- Coordinates: 53°00′08″N 118°25′34″W

Geography
- Location within Alberta Location within Canada
- Country: Canada
- Province: Alberta
- Protected area: Jasper National Park
- Parent range: Victoria Cross Ranges; Canadian Rockies
- Topo map: NTS 83E1 Snaring River

Monarch Mountain is a 2,777-metre (9,111-foot) mountain located in the Victoria Cross Ranges of Jasper National Park in Alberta, Canada. Its name comes from an unknown source. Precipitation runoff from the mountain drains into tributaries of the Miette River and Snaring River, which in turn are both tributaries of the Athabasca River.

== Climate ==
Based on the Köppen climate classification, the mountain is located in a subarctic climate zone with cold, snowy winters, and mild summers. Winter temperatures can drop below −20 °C with wind chill factors below −30 °C. The months July through September offer the most favorable weather to climb.

== Geology ==
The mountain is composed of sedimentary rock laid down during the Precambrian to Jurassic periods and pushed east and over the top of younger rock during the Laramide orogeny.

== Gallery ==
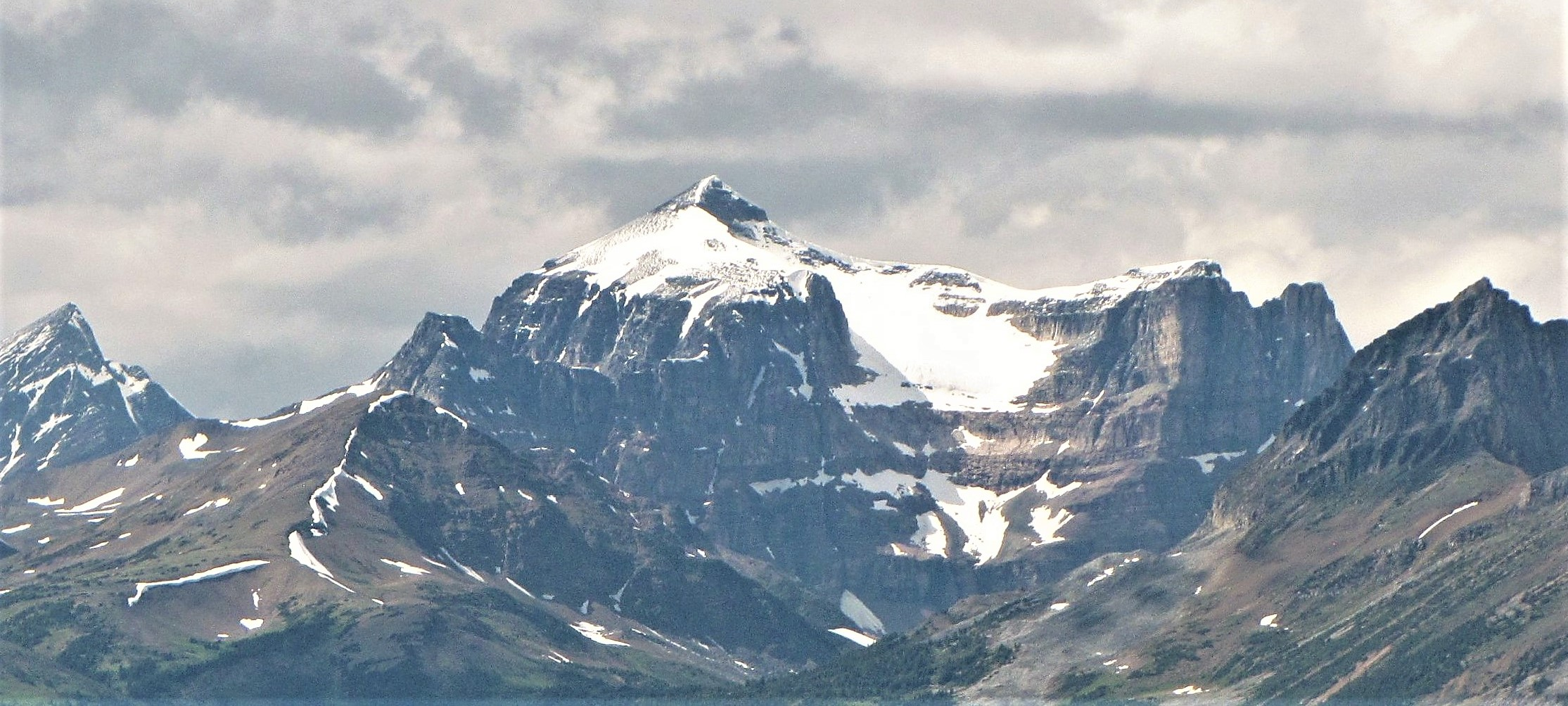
Monarch Mountain

== See also ==
- List of mountains in the Canadian Rockies
- Geography of Alberta
