= Indian Ridge (Alberta) =

Mountain in Alberta, Canada

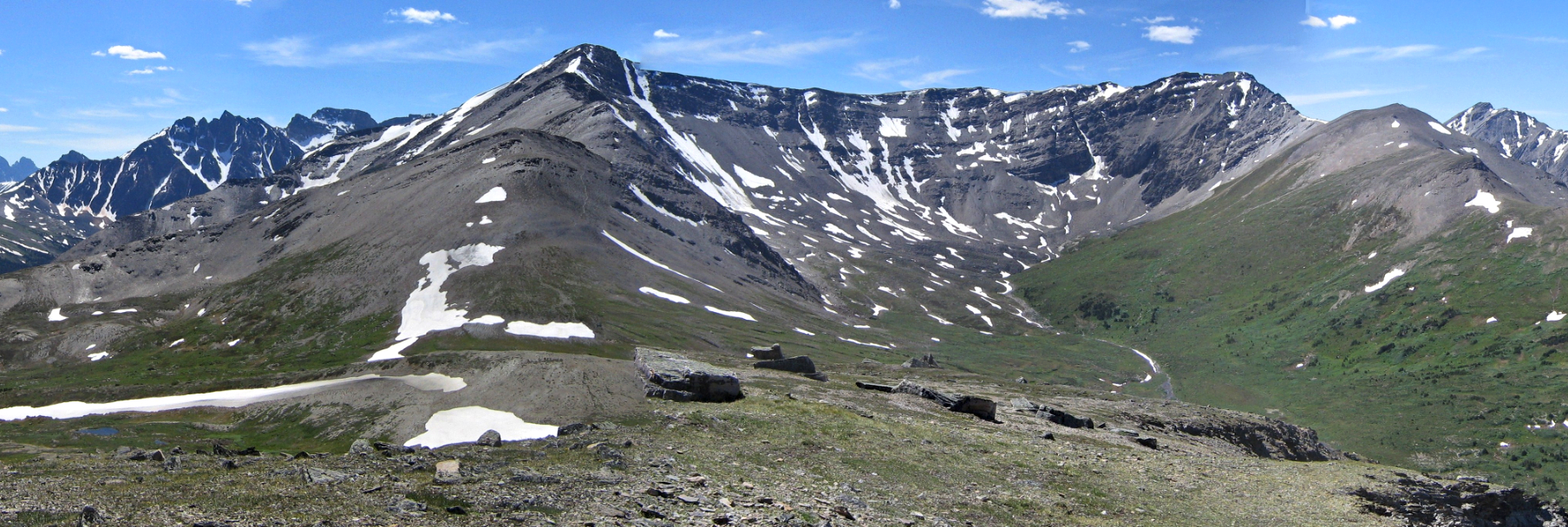
- Indian Ridge seen from The Whistlers.

Highest point
- Elevation: 2,820 m (9,250 ft)
- Prominence: 410 m (1,350 ft)
- Parent peak: Manx Peak (3044 m)
- Listing: Mountains of Alberta
- Coordinates: 52°48′44″N 118°10′12″W

Geography
- Location within Alberta Location within Canada
- Interactive map of Indian Ridge
- Location: Jasper National Park; Alberta, Canada
- Parent range: Trident Range; Canadian Rockies
- Topo map: NTS 83D16 Jasper

Climbing
- Easiest route: Easy Scramble

Indian Ridge is a 2,820-metre (9,252 ft) mountain located in Jasper National Park, in the Trident Range of the Canadian Rockies of Alberta, Canada. The summit is unofficially called Indian Peak. The town of Jasper is situated 9 kilometres (5.6 mi) to the north-northeast, The Whistlers lies 2.55 kilometres (1.58 mi) to the northeast, and Muhigan Mountain is 4.8 kilometres (3.0 mi) to the west-northwest. The nearest higher peak is Manx Peak, 4.3 km (2.7 mi) to the southwest, and Terminal Mountain lies 3.25 km (2.02 mi) to the south. The Marmot Basin alpine ski area on Marmot Mountain is located 4 kilometres (2.5 mi) to the southeast. The peak is composed of sedimentary rock laid down from the Precambrian to the Jurassic periods and pushed east and over the top of younger rock during the Laramide orogeny.

== History ==
The peak was named in 1916 by Morrison P. Bridgland because of its reddish colored rock. Bridgland (1878–1948), was a Dominion Land Surveyor who named many peaks in Jasper Park and the Canadian Rockies. The mountain's name was officially adopted in 1951 by the Geographical Names Board of Canada.

== Climate ==
Based on the Köppen climate classification, Indian Ridge is located in a subarctic climate zone with cold, snowy winters, and mild summers. Winter temperatures can drop below −20 °C (−4 °F) with wind chill factors below −30 °C (−22 °F). Precipitation runoff from Indian Ridge drains into tributaries of the Miette River and Athabasca River.

== Gallery ==
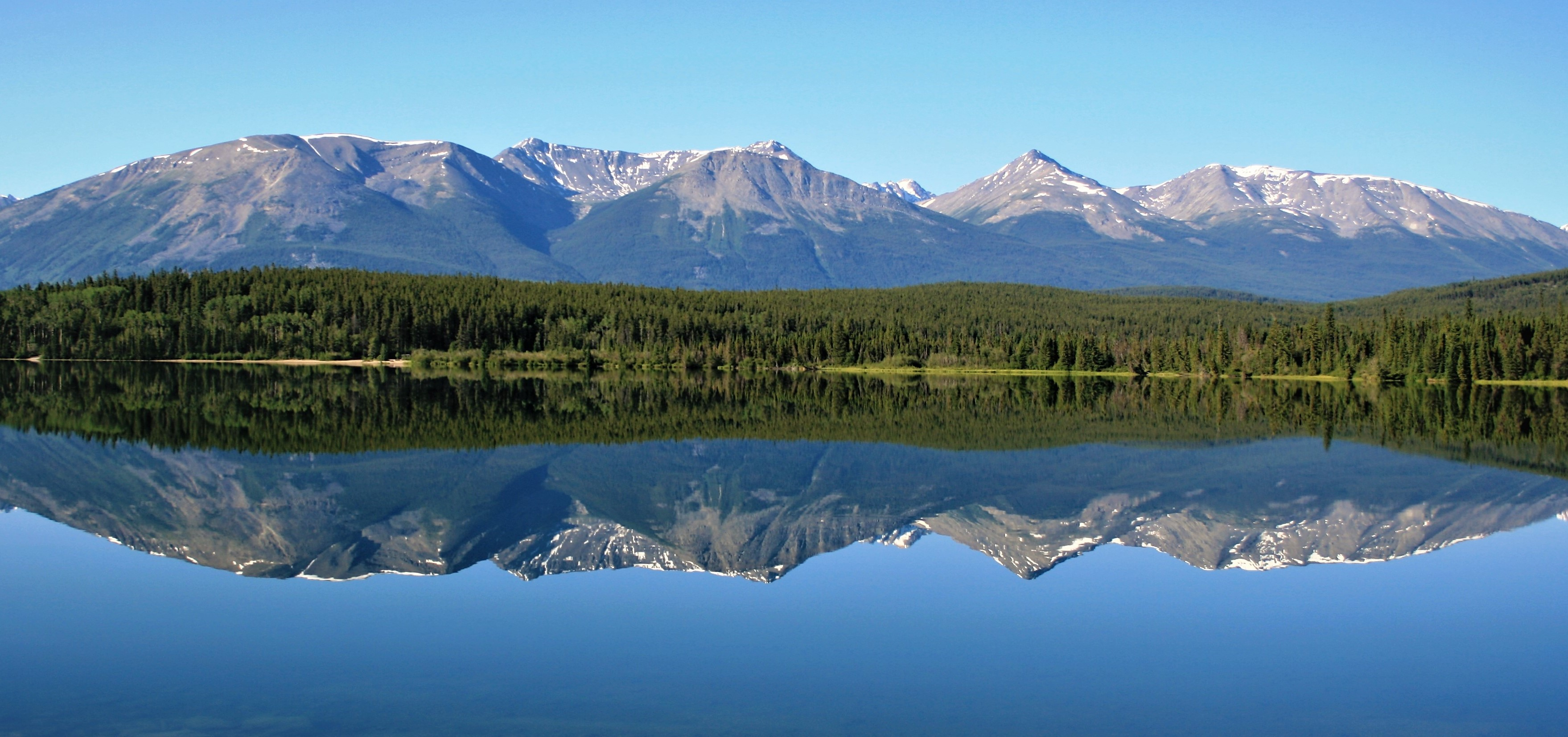
The Trident Range reflected in Pyramid Lake.
Left to rightː The Whistlers, Indian Ridge, Muhigan Mountain.

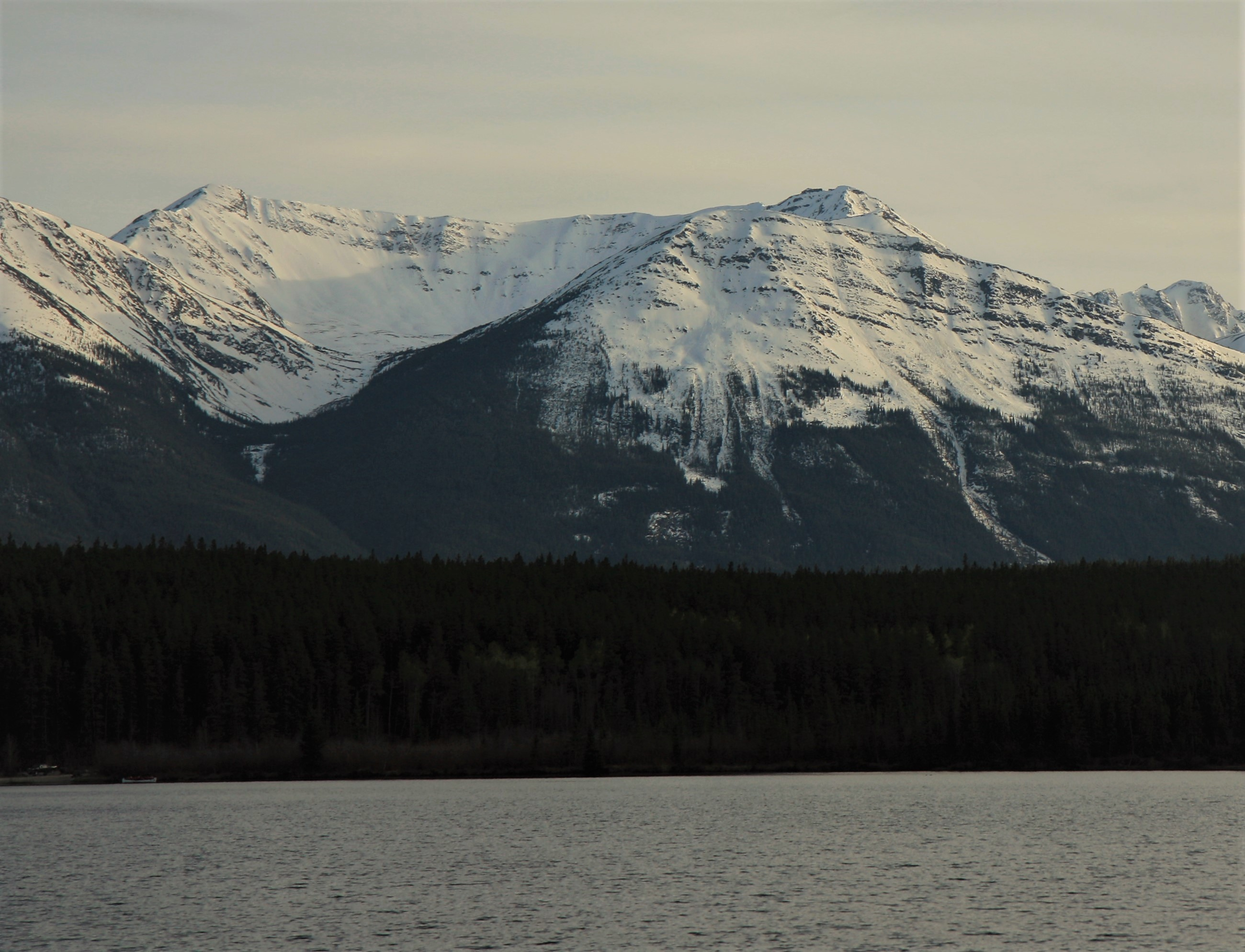
Indian Ridge seen from Pyramid Lake

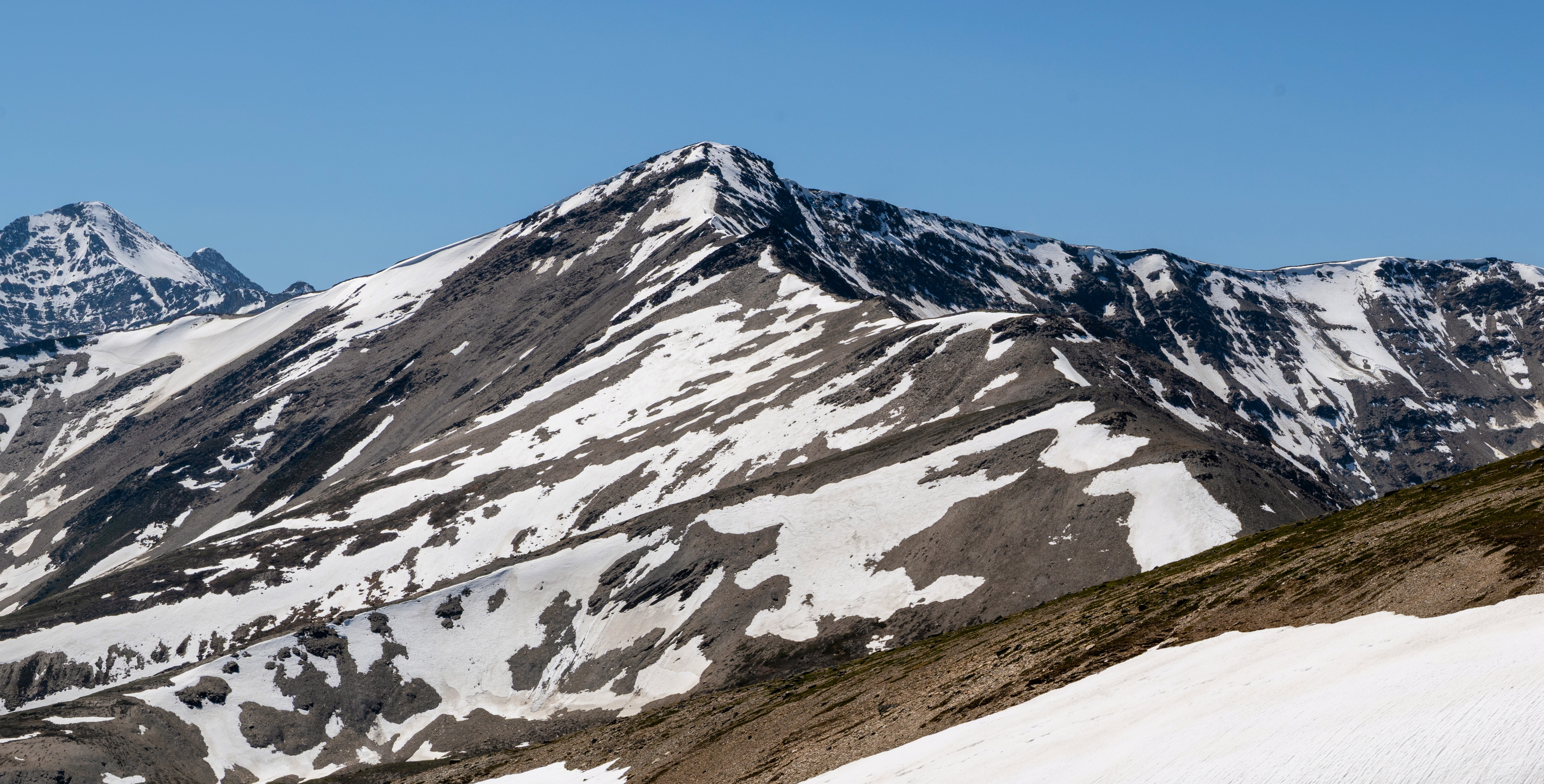
Indian Ridge viewed from The Whistlers

== See also ==
- Geography of Alberta
