= Monarch Mountain =

Monarch Mountain may refer to:

- Monarch Mountain (Alberta), a mountain in Jasper National Park, Alberta, Canada
- Monarch Mountain (British Columbia), a mountain in the Pacific Ranges, British Columbia, Canada
- Monarch Mountain (California), a mountain in California, United States (GNIS id 228914)
- Monarch Mountain (Montana), a mountain in Montana, United States (GNIS id 787552)
- Monarch Mountain (ski area), a ski resort in Colorado, United States
