= The Whistlers (Alberta) =

Mountain in Jasper National Park, Alberta, Canada

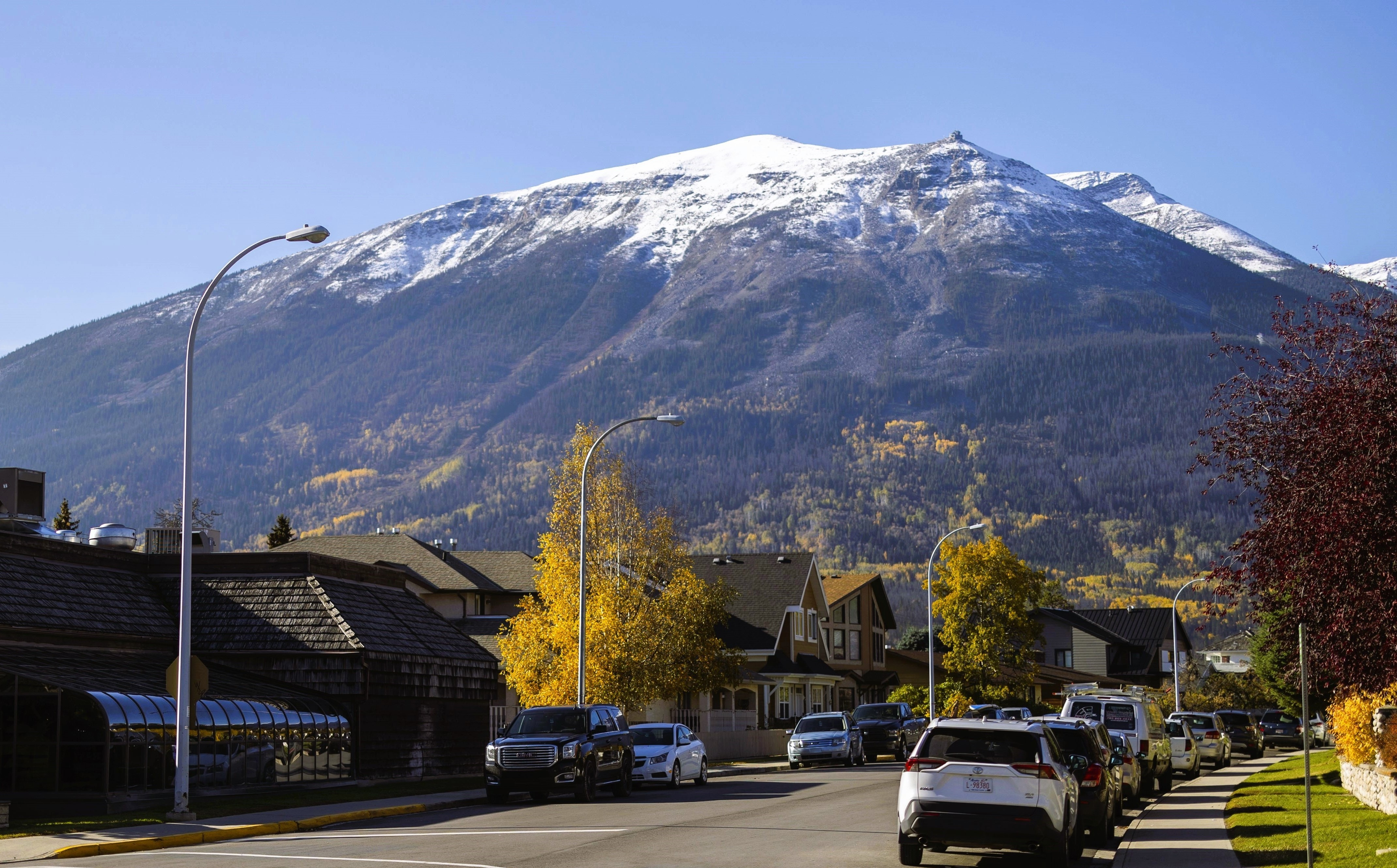
- The Whistlers seen from Jasper

Highest point
- Elevation: 2,470 m (8,100 ft)
- Prominence: 160 m (520 ft)
- Parent peak: Indian Peak (2820 m)
- Listing: Mountains of Alberta
- Coordinates: 52°49′37″N 118°07′58″W

Geography
- Location within Alberta Location within Canada
- Interactive map of The Whistlers
- Location: Jasper National Park; Alberta, Canada
- Parent range: Trident Range; Canadian Rockies
- Topo map: NTS 83D16 Jasper

Climbing
- Easiest route: Tram, hiking

The Whistlers is a 2,470-metre (8,100-foot) mountain summit located in Jasper National Park, in the Trident Range of the Canadian Rockies of Alberta, Canada. The municipality of Jasper is situated 7 kilometres to the northeast. The nearest higher neighbor is Indian Peak, 2.5 km (1.6 mi) to the southwest. The highest and longest aerial tramway in Canada ascends to a lookout at 2,277 meters elevation, still 193 meters below the summit, but a hiking trail continues to the summit. Some of the mountains that can be seen (weather permitting) from the top include Mount Robson, Mount Bridgland, Mount McNaughton, Monarch Mountain, Cairngorm, Pyramid Mountain, Hawk Mountain, Mount Colin, Grisette Mountain, Mount Tekarra, Mount Hardisty, Mount Kerkeslin, Marmot Mountain, Terminal Mountain, and Manx Peak.

== History ==
The descriptive name The Whistlers was applied in 1916 by Édouard-Gaston Deville of the Geological Survey of Canada for the whistling inhabitants of the mountain, the hoary marmot. The mountain's toponym was officially adopted in 1951 by the Geographical Names Board of Canada.

== Climate ==
Based on the Köppen climate classification, The Whistlers is located in a subarctic climate zone with cold, snowy winters, and mild summers. Winter temperatures can drop below -20 °C with wind chill factors below -30 °C. Precipitation runoff from The Whistlers drains into tributaries of the Athabasca River.

== Gallery ==
Views from the top

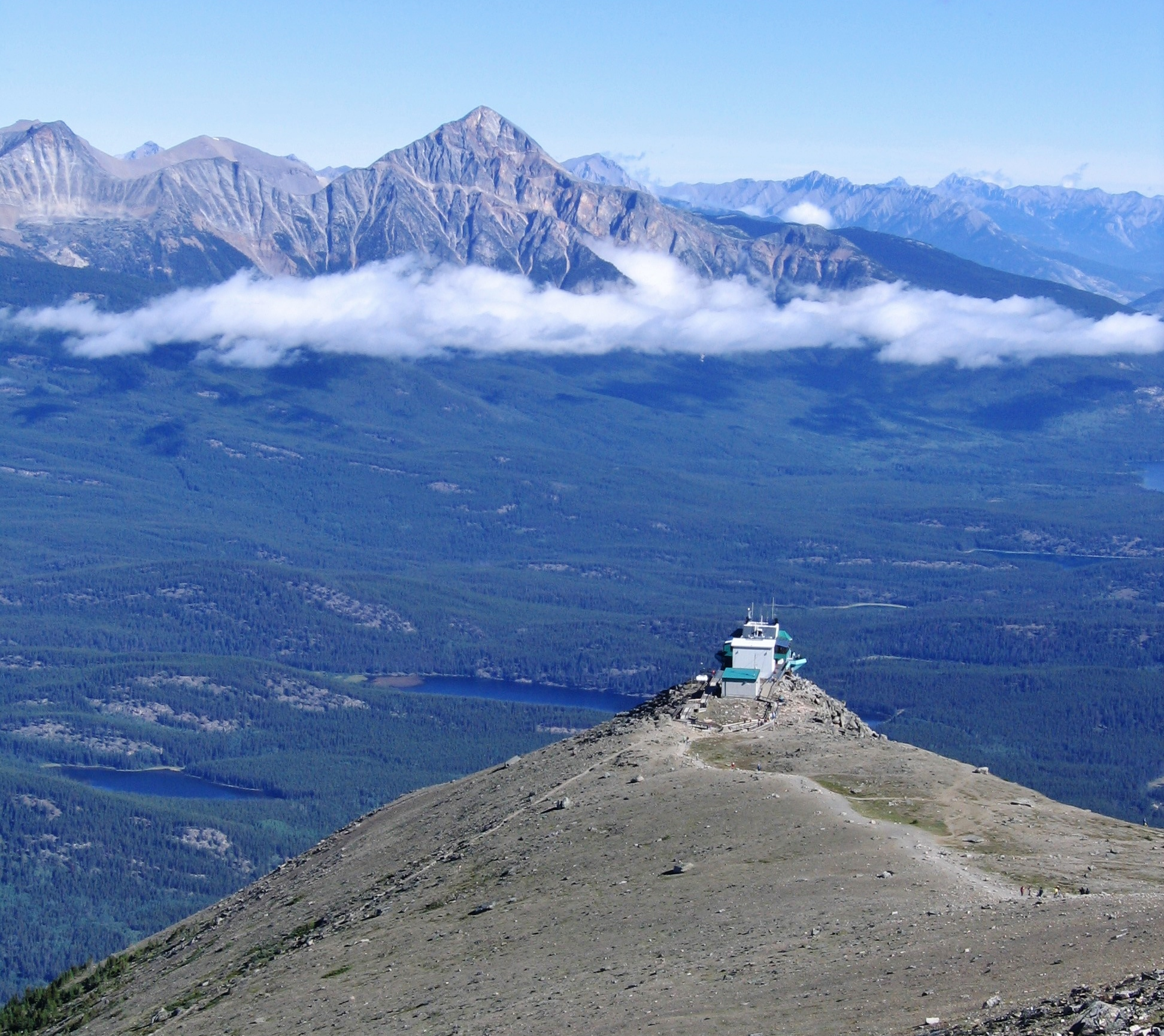
Summit view of the lookout and Pyramid Mountain

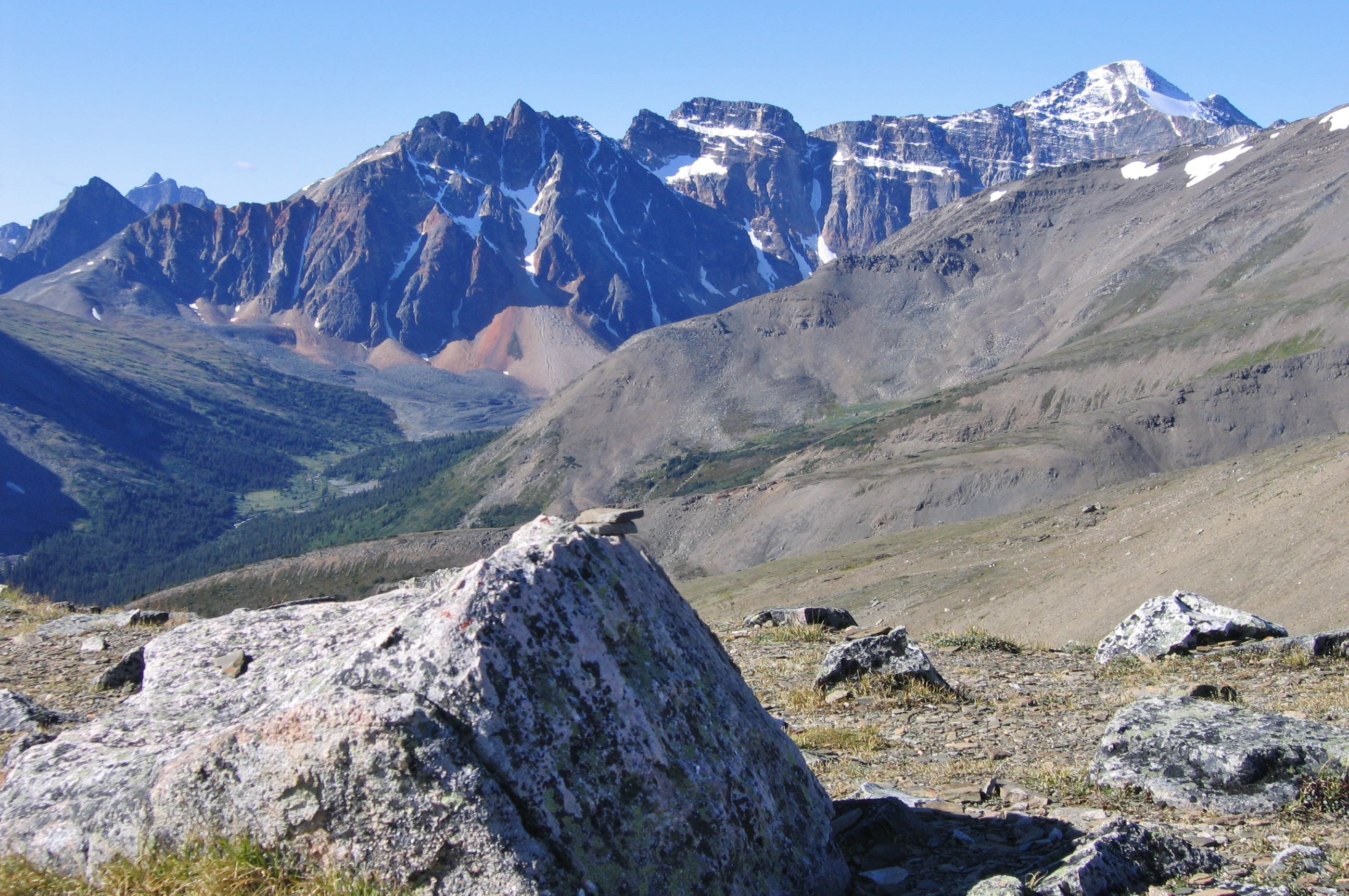
View of Terminal Mountain and Manx Peak

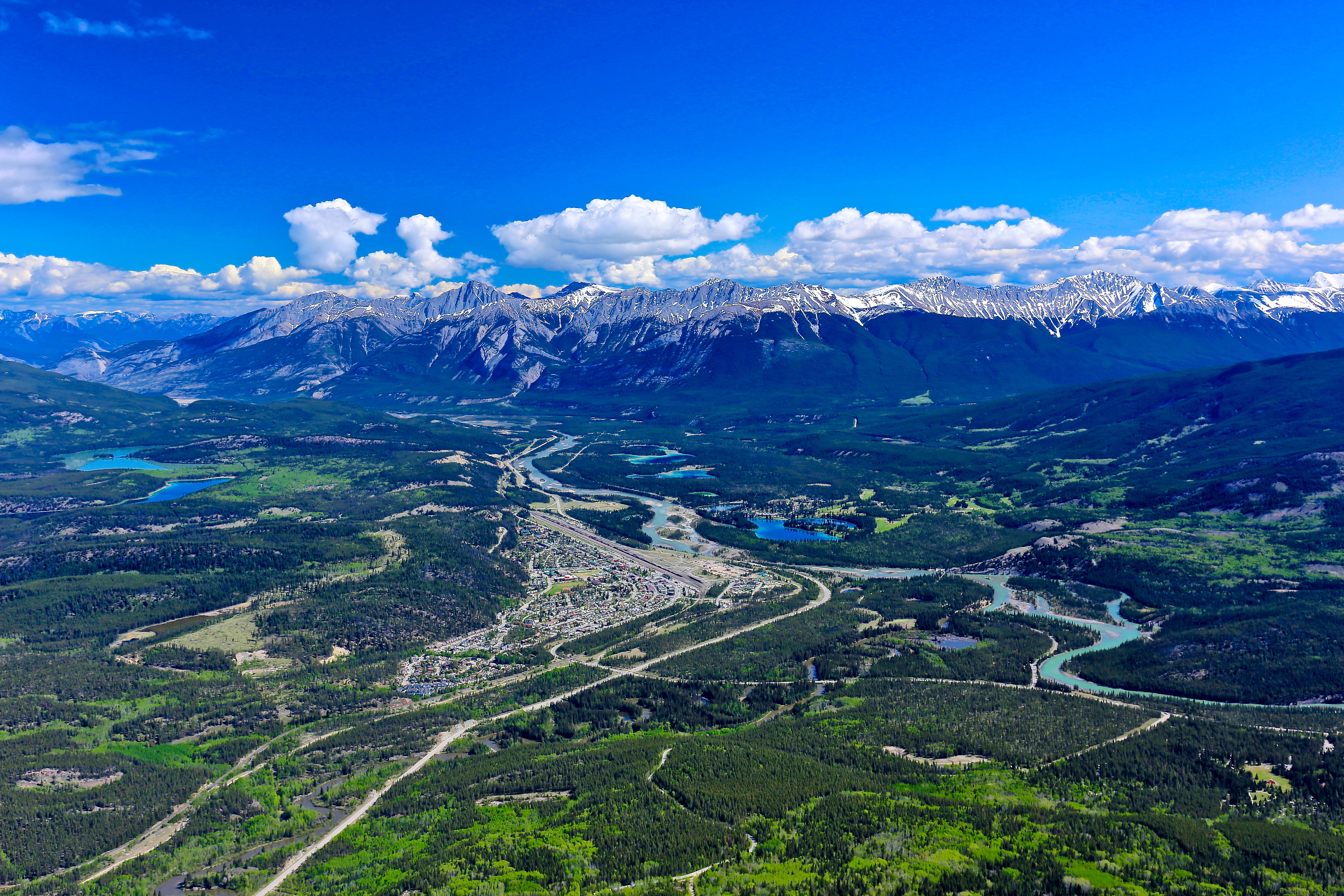
View of Jasper and the Colin Range

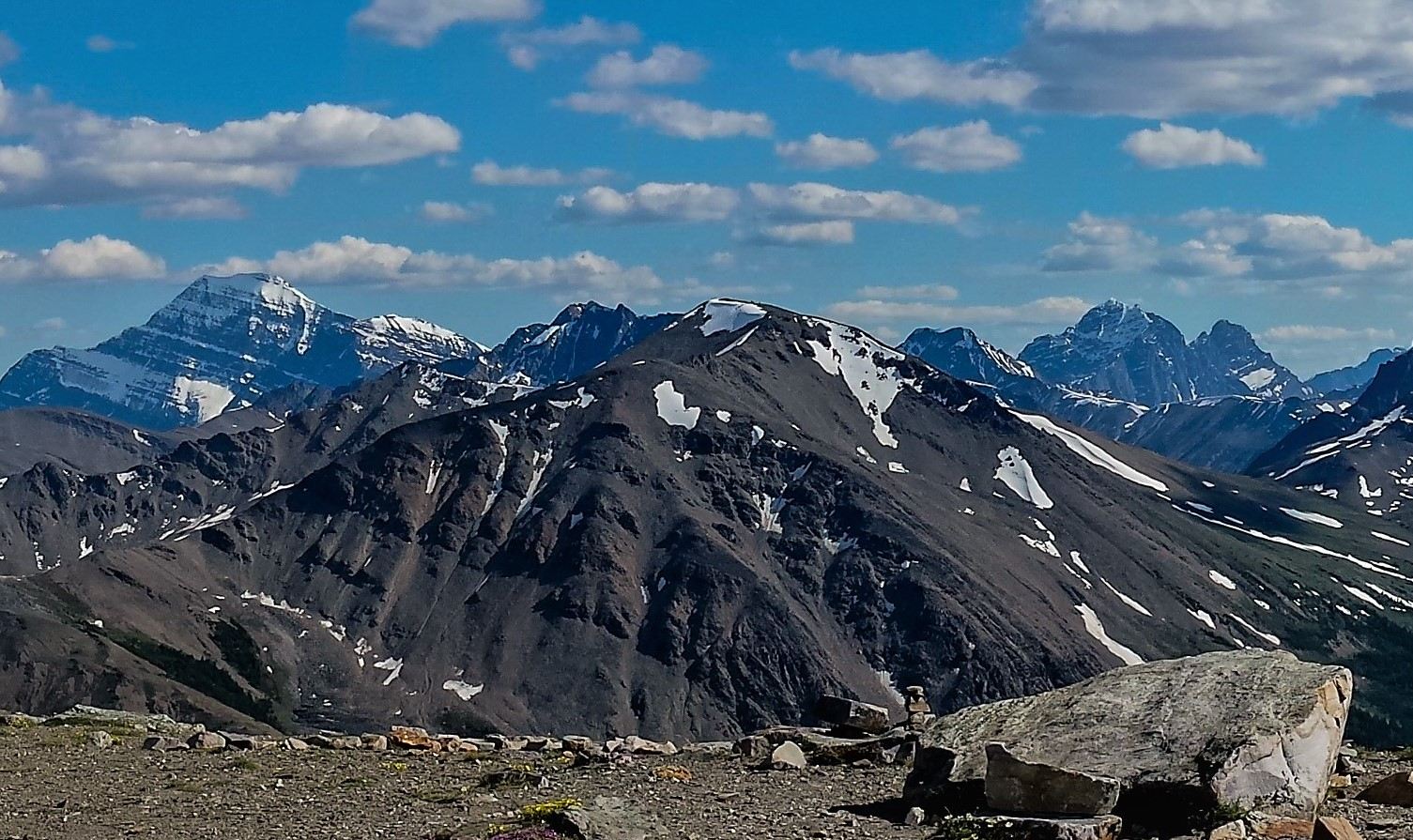
View south L→R Mount Edith Cavell, Lectern Peak, Marmot Mountain, Chak Peak, Throne Mountain, Blackhorn Peak.

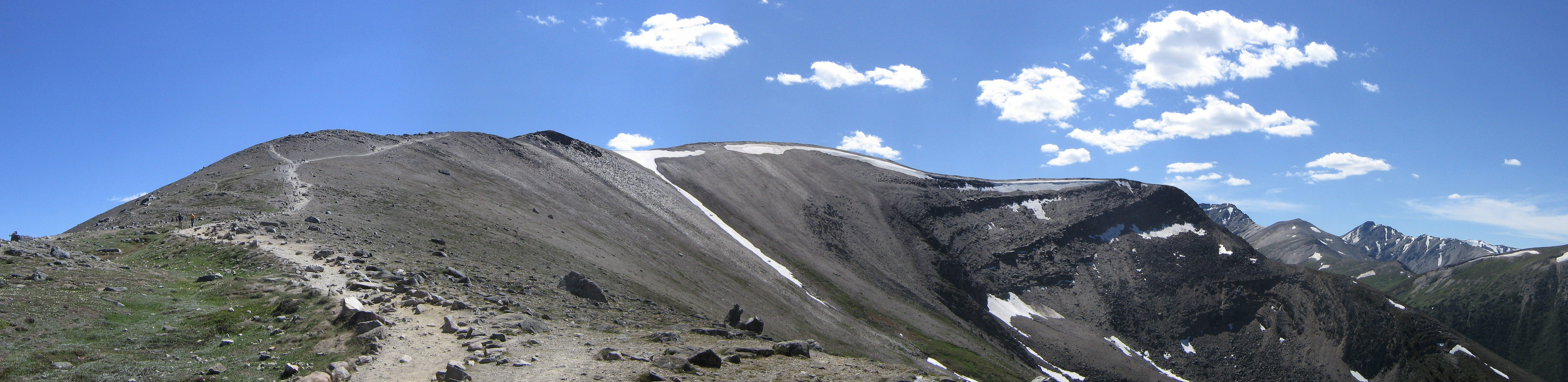
Walking to the top of The Whistlers

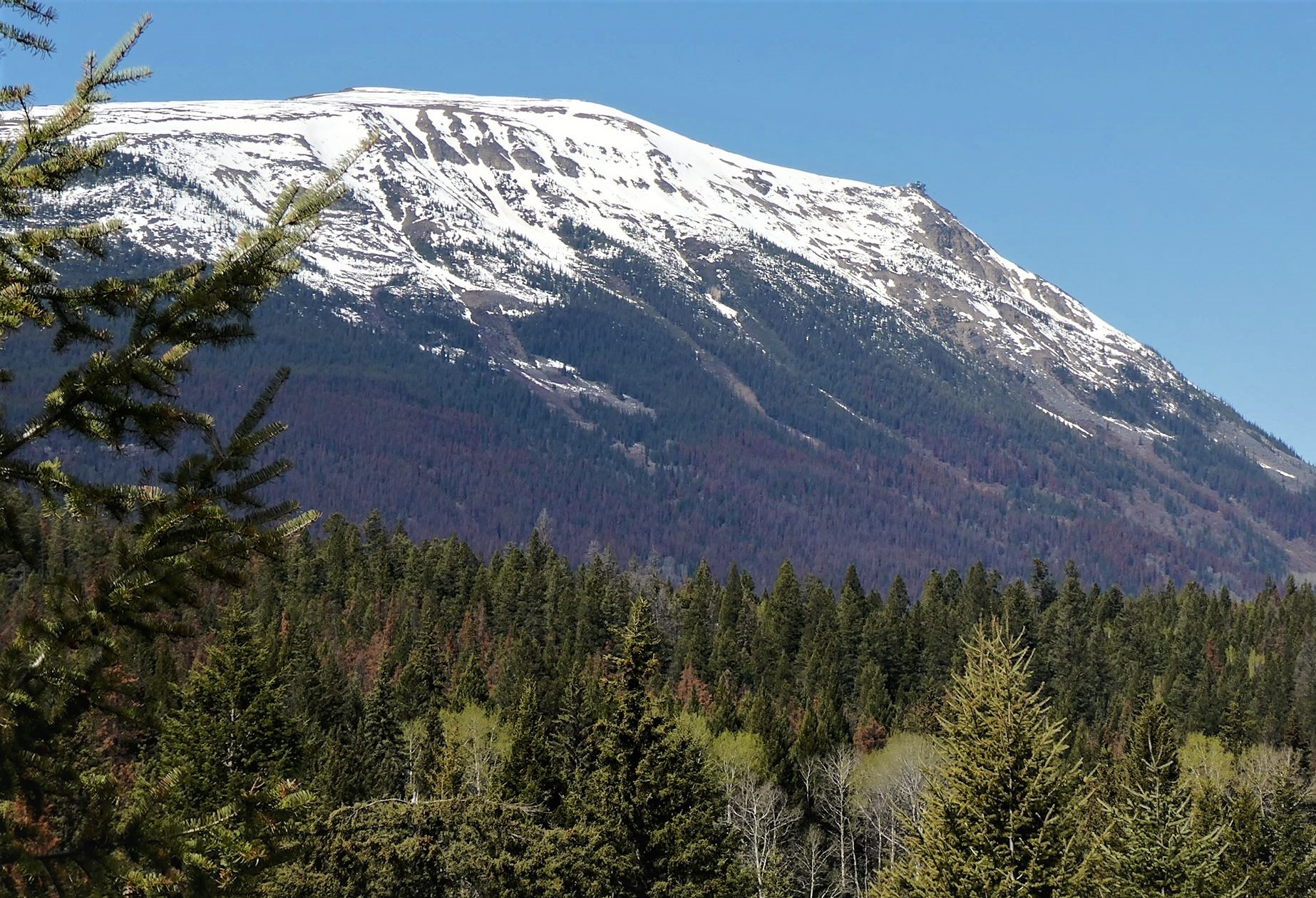
East aspect

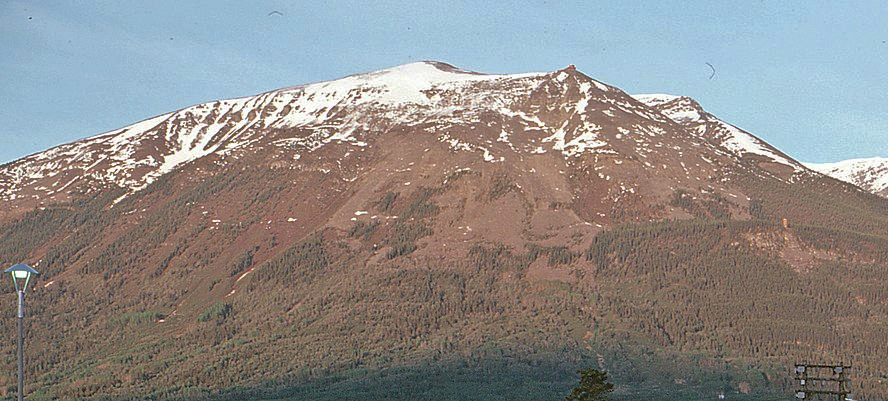
The Whistlers seen from Jasper

== See also ==
- List of mountains of Canada
