= Consort Mountain =

Mountain in Alberta, Canada

- Location within Alberta

Highest point
- Elevation: 2,883 m (9,459 ft)
- Prominence: 536 m (1,759 ft)
- Listing: Mountains of Alberta
- Coordinates: 53°00′34″N 118°19′48″W

Geography
- Country: Canada
- Province: Alberta
- Parent range: Victoria Cross Ranges
- Topo map: NTS 83E1 Snaring River

Consort Mountain is on the north side of an unnamed creek that drains eastward into the Snaring River. The origin of the name is unknown. It is located in the Victoria Cross Ranges in Alberta.
