= Mount Oliver (Alberta) =

Mountain in Alberta, Canada

- Location within Alberta

Highest point
- Elevation: 2,865 m (9,400 ft)
- Prominence: 455 m (1,493 ft)
- Parent peak: Snaring Mountain (2931 m)
- Listing: Mountains of Alberta
- Coordinates: 53°01′09″N 118°21′02″W

Geography
- Country: Canada
- Province: Alberta
- Protected area: Jasper National Park
- Parent range: Victoria Cross Ranges
- Topo map: NTS 83E1 Snaring River

Mount Oliver was named in 1954 after Frank Oliver the founder of the Edmonton Bulletin. It is located in the Victoria Cross Ranges in Alberta.

== See also ==
- Geography of Alberta
