= Mount Kerr =

Mount Kerr may refer to:

- Mount Kerr (Alberta) in Alberta, Canada
- Mount Kerr (Antarctica)
- Mount Kerr (Marble Range) in British Columbia, Canada
- Mount Kerr (Pacific Ranges) in British Columbia, Canada
- Mount Kerr (President Range) in the Yoho National Park, British Columbia, Canada
