= Mount Oliver =

Mount Oliver can refer to:

- Mount Oliver, Pennsylvania, a borough
- Mount Oliver (Pittsburgh), a neighborhood (outside of the borough)
- Mount Oliver (Antarctica) in the Prince Olav Mountains of Antarctica
- Mount Oliver (Alberta) in the Canadian Rockies

== See also ==
- Mount John Oliver, British Columbia, Canada
