= Mount Kerr (Alberta) =

Mountain in Alberta, Canada

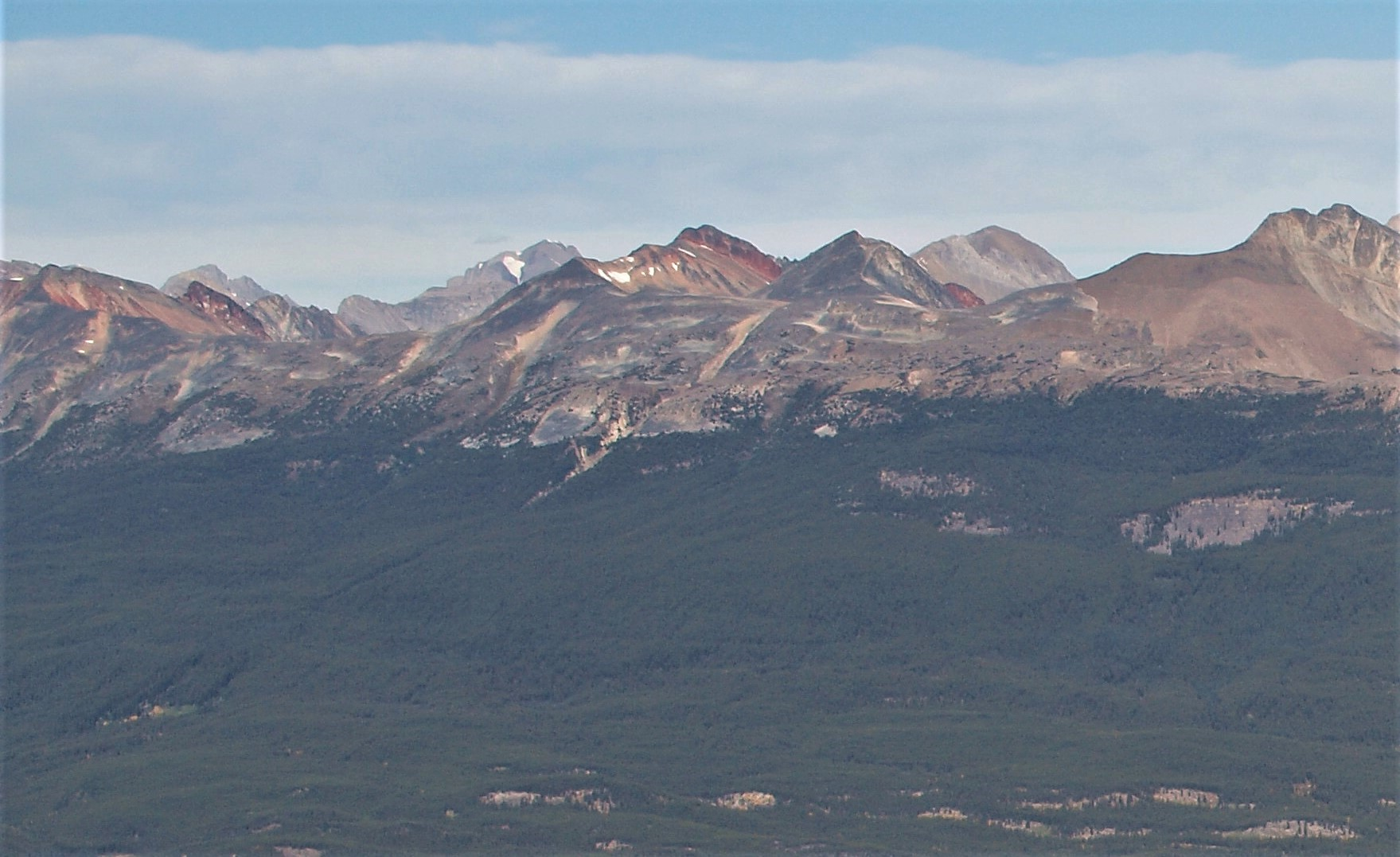
- Mount Kerr (reddish peak centered) viewed from The Whistlers

Highest point
- Elevation: 2,560 m (8,400 ft)
- Prominence: 190 m (620 ft)
- Listing: Mountains of Alberta
- Coordinates: 52°56′10″N 118°13′15″W

Geography
- Location within Alberta Location within Canada
- Country: Canada
- Province: Alberta
- Protected area: Jasper National Park
- Parent range: Victoria Cross Ranges
- Topo map: NTS 83D16 Jasper

Mount Kerr is a mountain in the Victoria Cross Ranges of Alberta, Canada. It is set within Jasper National Park in the Canadian Rockies. The town of Jasper is situated 12 kilometres (7.5 mi) to the southeast and Cairngorm is 2 kilometres (1.2 mi) to the east. The peak was named for Private John Chipman Kerr who earned the Victoria Cross for his actions in 1916 during World War I.

== Climate ==
Based on the Köppen climate classification, Mount Kerr is located in a subarctic climate zone with cold, snowy winters, and mild summers. Winter temperatures can drop below −20 °C (−4 °F) with wind chill factors below −30 °C (−22 °F).

== See also ==
- Geography of Alberta
