= Mount Mahood =

Mountain in Alberta, Canada

- Location within Alberta

Highest point
- Elevation: 2,896 m (9,501 ft)
- Prominence: 606 m (1,988 ft)
- Parent peak: Mount Bridgland (2930 m)
- Listing: Mountains of Alberta
- Coordinates: 53°01′44″N 118°35′35″W

Geography
- Country: Canada
- Province: Alberta
- Parent range: Victoria Cross Ranges
- Topo map: NTS 83E2 Resplendent Creek

Mount Mahood was named in 1871 for James Adams Mahood, a CPR engineer and land surveyor. It is located in the Victoria Cross Ranges in Alberta.
