= Fox River, Nova Scotia =

Community in Nova Scotia, Canada

Fox River
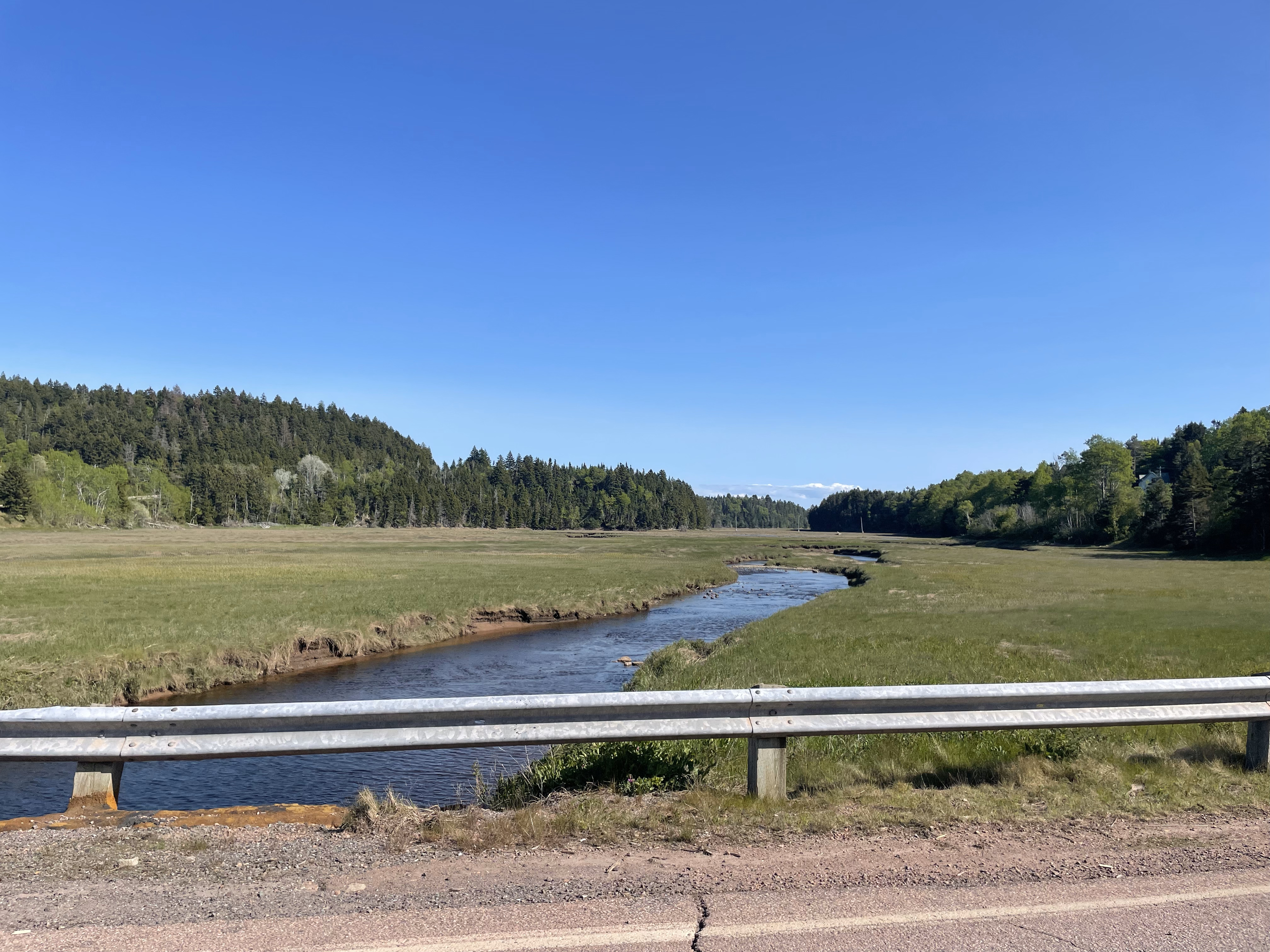
- The Fox River tidal marsh viewed from route 209

- Location within Nova Scotia
- Coordinates: 45°24′N 64°31′W
- Country: Canada
- Province: Nova Scotia
- Municipality: Cumberland County
- First Settled: 1784
- Electoral Districts Federal: Cumberland-Colchester
- Provincial: Cumberland South

Government
  - MP: Stephen Ellis (Conservative Party of Canada)
  - MLA: Tory Rushton Progressive Conservative Party of Nova Scotia
- Time zone: UTC-4 (AST)
- Postal code: B
- Area code: 902
- Part of a series about Places in Nova Scotia

Fox River is a rural community in Cumberland County, Nova Scotia.

Fox River is the birthplace of John Chipman (Chip) Kerr, who was awarded the Victoria Cross in World War I. He was one of only four Nova Scotians to be awarded the VC, which is presented for an act of conspicuous valour in the face of the enemy. His VC is held by the Canadian War Museum in Ottawa and his story is featured at the nearby Age of Sail Heritage Centre.

== History ==
Fox River was founded in 1784 in the wake of the American Revolution. Loyalists from the Thirteen Colonies who wished to remain under the British crown migrated to the loyal colony of Nova Scotia, and were granted land as a reward. The Fox River land grants were among these grants issued to loyalists. Names such as Hatfield were among the recipients, a family name that still has a presence in the community to this day.

=== Acadians ===
It is speculated that a small Acadian settlement existed within the boundaries of Fox River prior to the arrival of the loyalists. In the Fox River tidal marsh stand dike structures often seen in land reclamation efforts by the Acadians, but it has not been confirmed whether a hamlet existed in the area or not.
