= Mount Bridgland =

Mountain in Alberta, Canada

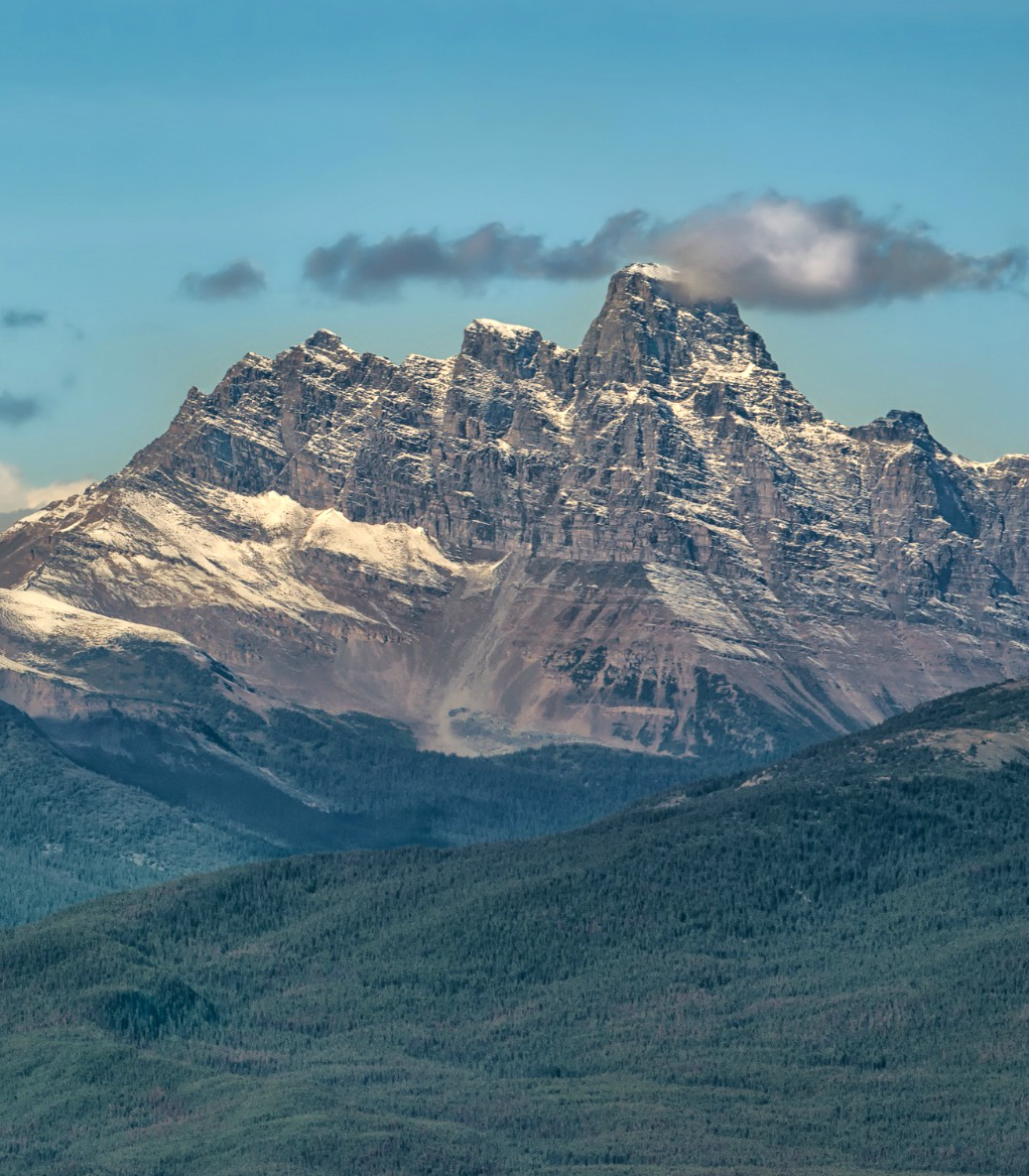
- Mount Bridgland seen from The Whistlers

Highest point
- Elevation: 2,930 m (9,610 ft)
- Prominence: 405 m (1,329 ft)
- Parent peak: Derr Peak 2966 m
- Listing: Mountains of Alberta
- Coordinates: 52°57′11″N 118°31′33″W

Geography
- Location within Alberta Location within Canada
- Country: Canada
- Province: Alberta
- Protected area: Jasper National Park
- Parent range: Victoria Cross Ranges; Canadian Rockies
- Topo map: NTS 83D15 Lucerne

Climbing
- First ascent: 1946 by Frank Smythe, Rex Gibson, David Wessel

Mount Bridgland is a 2,930-metre (9,610 ft) mountain located in the Victoria Cross Ranges of Jasper National Park in Alberta, Canada. It was named by Frank Sissons in 1923 after Morrison P. Bridgland (1878-1948), a Dominion Land Surveyor who named many peaks in Jasper Park and the Canadian Rockies.

== Climate ==
Based on the Köppen climate classification, Mount Bridgland is located in a subarctic climate zone with cold, snowy winters, and mild summers. Temperatures can drop below −20 °C with wind chill factors below −30 °C. In terms of favorable weather, July through September are the best months to climb. Precipitation runoff from the mountain drains into tributaries of the Miette River.

== Geology ==
The mountain is composed of sedimentary rock laid down during the Precambrian to Jurassic periods and pushed east and over the top of younger rock during the Laramide orogeny.

== Gallery ==
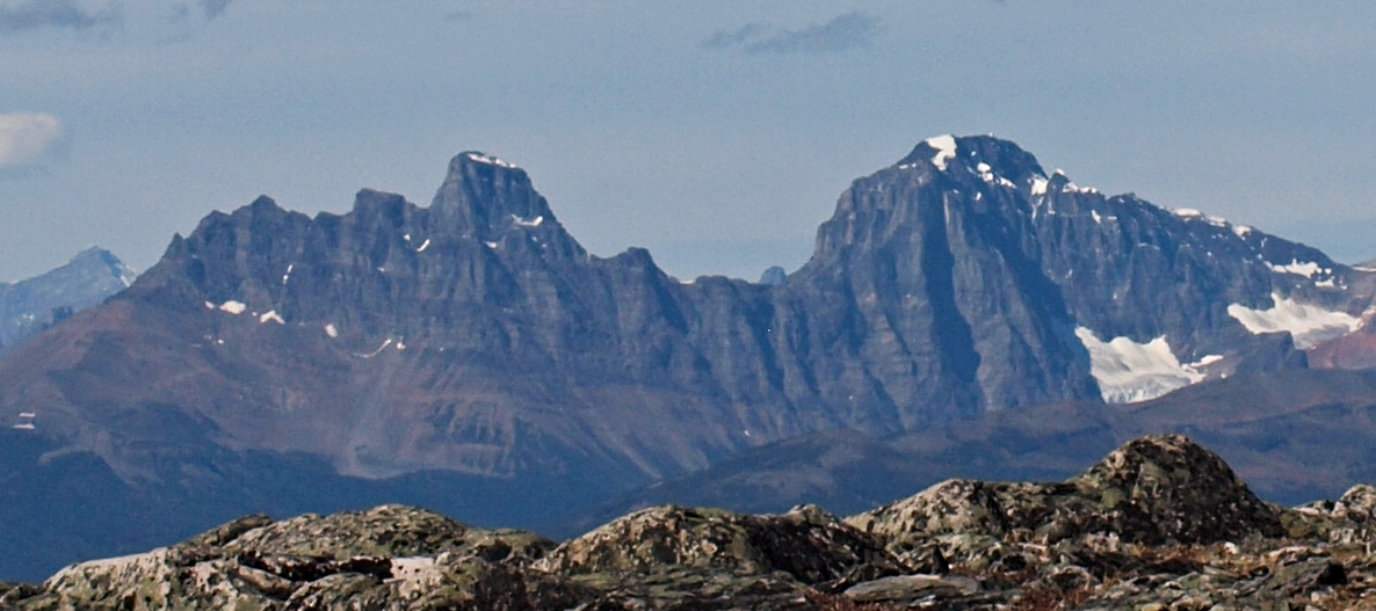
Mount Bridgland (left) and Derr Peak (right)

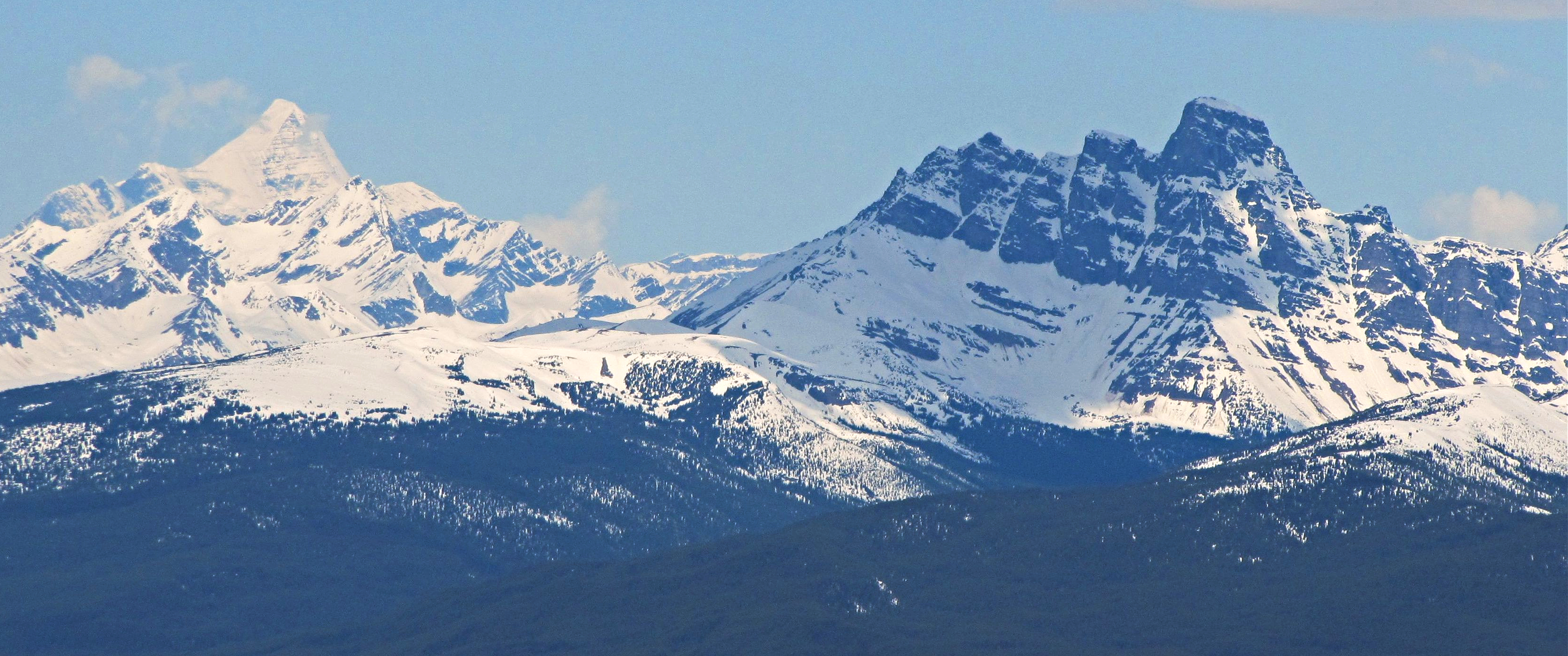
Mount Robson and Mount Bridgland

== See also ==
- List of mountains in the Canadian Rockies
- Geography of Alberta
