= Mount Beaupré =

Mountain in Alberta, Canada

- Location within Alberta

Highest point
- Elevation: 2,778 m (9,114 ft)
- Prominence: 178 m (584 ft)
- Parent peak: Mount Mahood (2896 m)
- Listing: Mountains of Alberta
- Coordinates: 53°02′47″N 118°36′42″W

Geography
- Country: Canada
- Province: Alberta
- Parent range: Victoria Cross Ranges
- Topo map: NTS 82E2 Greenwood

Mount Beaupré is named after a member of the Sandford Fleming party of 1872. It is located in the Victoria Cross Ranges in Alberta.
