= Emigrants Mountain =

Mountain in Jasper National Park in Alberta, Canada

- Location within Alberta

Highest point
- Elevation: 2,553 m (8,376 ft)
- Prominence: 173 m (568 ft)
- Parent peak: Mount McKean (2743 m)
- Listing: Mountains of Alberta
- Coordinates: 52°56′35″N 118°18′50″W

Geography
- Country: Canada
- Province: Alberta
- Protected area: Jasper National Park
- Parent range: Victoria Cross Ranges
- Topo map: NTS 83D16 Jasper

Emigrants Mountain is a summit in Jasper National Park in Alberta, Canada. accessible by walking track and with views over the Miette Valley, Mount Fitzwilliam and other peaks in the Great Divide. Emigrants Mountain was so named on account of gold prospectors in the area during the Cariboo Gold Rush.
