= John Chipman Kerr =

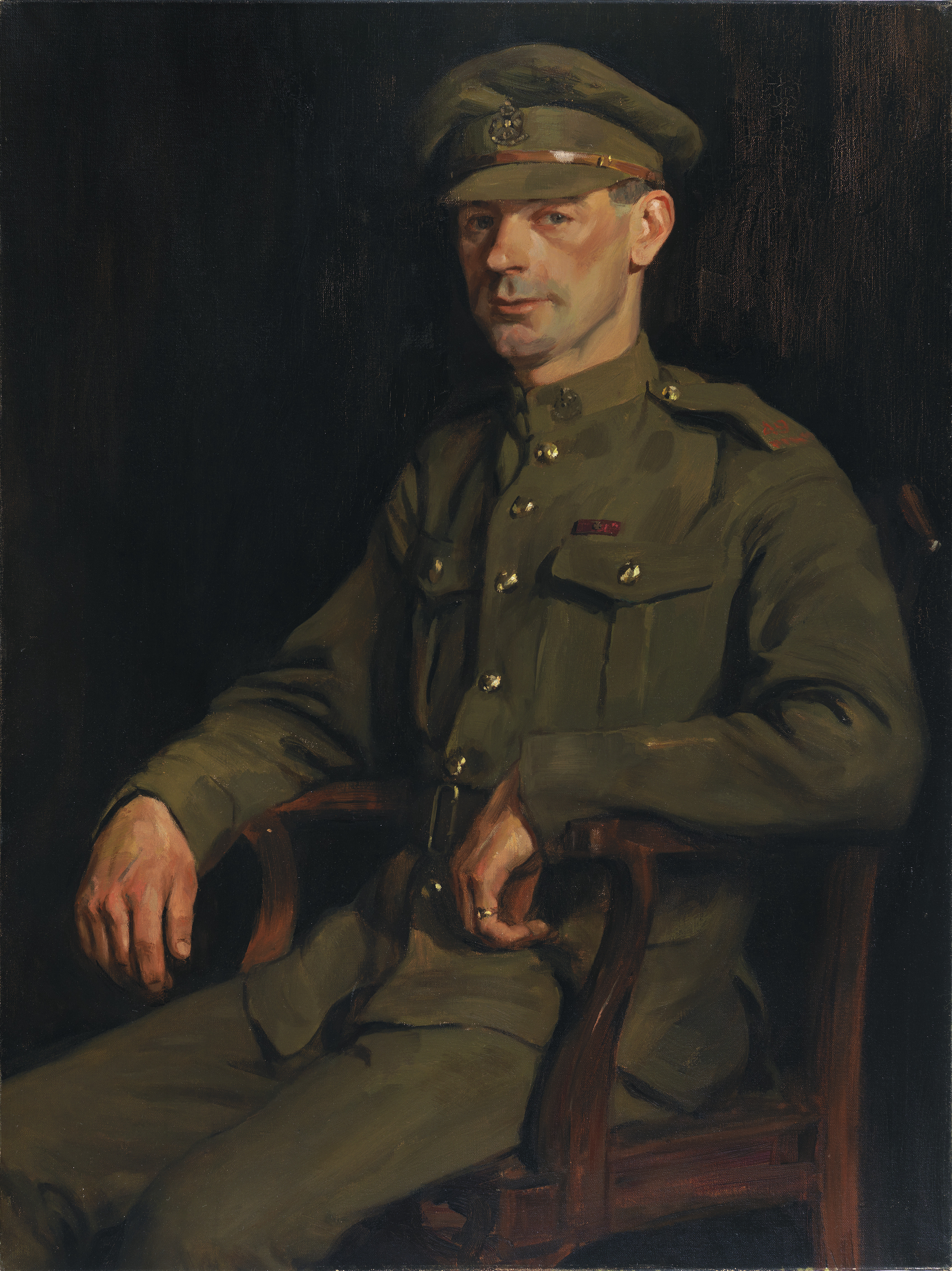
- portrait painted by A. Y. Jackson
- Born: 11 January 1887; Fox River, Nova Scotia
- Died: 19 February 1963 (aged 76); Port Moody, British Columbia
- Burial place: Mountain View Cemetery, Vancouver
- Military career
- Allegiance: Canada
- Branch: Canadian Expeditionary Force; Canadian Army; Royal Canadian Air Force
- Rank: Private (Army); Sergeant (Air Force)
- Units: 49th (Edmonton) Battalion
- Conflicts: First World War; Second World War
- Awards: Victoria Cross

John Chipman Kerr VC (January 11, 1887 – February 19, 1963), was the twenty-first Canadian recipient of the Victoria Cross, the highest and most prestigious award for gallantry in the face of the enemy that can be awarded to British and other Commonwealth forces.

In 1912, after working as a lumberjack in the Kootenay district of British Columbia, he bought a homestead in Spirit River, Alberta, where he and his brother farmed until war broke out. Immediately they set out for Edmonton, leaving only a single note tacked to the door of their humble shed. It read: "War is Hell, but what is homesteading?"

He was 29 years old, and a private in the 49th (Edmonton) Battalion, Canadian Expeditionary Force, during the First World War when the following deed took place for which he was awarded the VC.

On 16 September 1916 at Courcelette, France, during a bombing attack, Private Kerr was acting as bayonet man and noting that bombs were running short, he ran along the parados under heavy fire until he was in close contact with the enemy when he opened fire at point-blank range, inflicting heavy losses. The enemy, thinking that they were surrounded, surrendered: 62 prisoners were taken and 250 yards of enemy trench captured. Earlier, Private Kerr's fingers had been blown off, but he did not have his wound dressed until he and two other men had escorted the prisoners back under fire and reported for duty.

His Victoria Cross is displayed at the Canadian War Museum in Ottawa, Ontario, Canada.

Mount Kerr in the Victoria Cross Ranges in Jasper National Park, Alberta, was named in his honour in 1951, and in 2006 Chip Kerr Park in Port Moody, British Columbia, was dedicated.

After the war he returned to farm in Alberta and also worked in the oil patch and as a forest ranger in Alberta.

He was a great uncle of Greg Kerr, member of Parliament for West Nova 2008–2015.

== See also ==
- Military history of Nova Scotia
