= Victoria Cross Ranges =

Subrange of the Front Ranges in Alberta, Canada

Victoria Cross Range
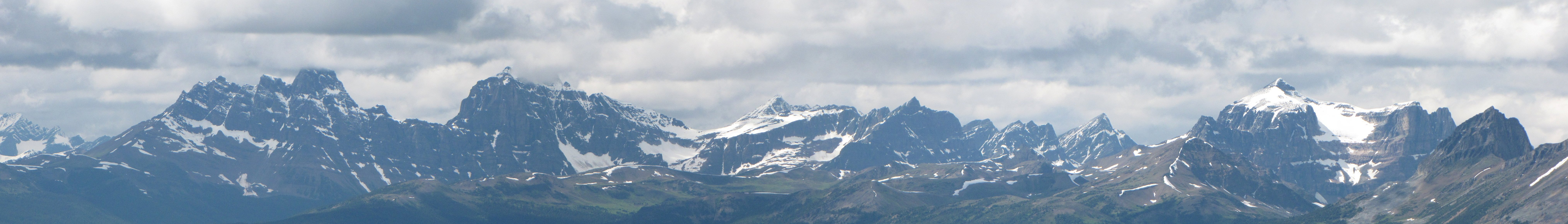
- Victoria Cross Ranges

Highest point
- Peak: Snaring Mountain
- Elevation: 2,931 m (9,616 ft)
- Listing: Mountains of Alberta
- Coordinates: 53°02′17″N 118°19′50″W

Dimensions
- Area: 678 km^{2} (262 mi^{2})

Geography
- Location within Alberta
- Country: Canada
- Province: Alberta
- Range coordinates: 53°00′N 118°18′W
- Parent range: Canadian Rockies
- Topo map: NTS 83E2 Resplendent Creek

The Victoria Cross Ranges (52°55′N 118°18′W to 53°05′N 118°30′W) are a set of mountain ranges in the Canadian Rockies, located to the northwest of Jasper. Of the 19 peaks contained within this range, five are named after Canadian recipients of the Victoria Cross. The area of the ranges is 678 square kilometres (262 sq mi).

This range includes the following mountains and peaks:

Mountain/Peak	Elevation (m/ft)		namesake
Snaring Mountain	2,931	9,616	Named for local Indigenous tribe who used snares to trap small animals
Mount Bridgland	2,930	9,610	Morrison Bridgland (not VC recipient)
Mount Mahood	2,896	9,501	
Consort Mountain	2,883	9,459	Unknown
Mount Oliver	2,865	9,400	Frank Oliver
Mount Beaupré	2,778	9,114	
Monarch Mountain	2,777	9,111	
Pyramid Mountain	2,766	9,075	
Mount McKean	2,743	8,999	George Burdon McKean, VC
Buttress Mountain	2,685	8,809	
Mount Griesbach	2,682	8,799	William Antrobus Griesbach (not VC recipient)
Mount Kinross	2,650	8,690	Cecil John Kinross, VC
Mount Zengel	2,630	8,630	Raphael Louis Zengel, VC
Mount Henry	2,629	8,625	Henry A.F. MacLeod, CPR engineer
Cairngorm	2,610	8,560	
Mount Kerr	2,560	8,400	John Chipman Kerr, VC
Emigrants Mountain	2,553	8,376	
Elysium Mountain	2,446	8,025	
Mount Pattison	2,316	7,598	John George Pattison, VC

== See also ==
- Ranges of the Canadian Rockies
