= Chak Peak =

Mountain in Alberta, Canada

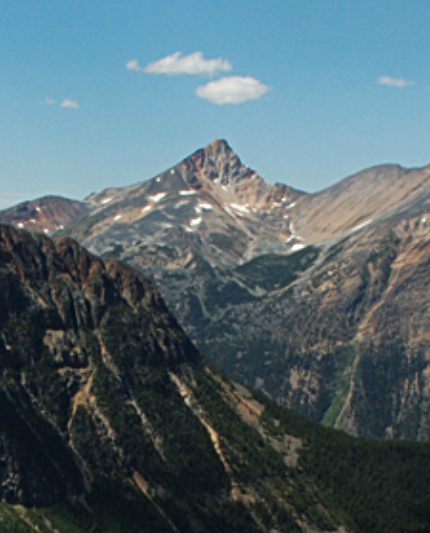
- Chak Peak seen from Cavell Meadows Trail

Highest point
- Elevation: 2,775 m (9,104 ft)
- Prominence: 235 m (771 ft)
- Parent peak: Franchère Peak 2805 m
- Listing: Mountains of Alberta
- Coordinates: 52°42′43″N 118°07′38″W

Geography
- Location within Alberta Location within Canada
- Location: Jasper National Park; Alberta, Canada
- Parent range: Canadian Rockies
- Topo map: NTS 83D9 Amethyst Lakes

Climbing
- First ascent: 1915 Topographical Survey

Chak Peak is a 2,775-metre (9,104-foot) mountain summit located in the Athabasca River valley of Jasper National Park, in the Canadian Rockies of Alberta, Canada. Chak is a name derived from the Stoney language meaning "eagle". Precipitation runoff from Chak Peak drains into Portal Creek and Astoria River which are both tributaries of the Athabasca River.

== Climate ==
Based on the Köppen climate classification, Chak Peak is located in a subarctic climate with cold, snowy winters, and mild summers. Temperatures can drop below -20 °C with wind chill factors below -30 °C.

== Geology ==
The mountain is composed of sedimentary rock laid down during the Precambrian to Jurassic periods and pushed east and over the top of younger rock during the Laramide orogeny.

== See also ==
- Geography of Alberta
