= Snaring Mountain =

Mountain in Alberta, Canada

- Location within Alberta

Highest point
- Elevation: 2,931 m (9,616 ft)
- Prominence: 1,057 m (3,468 ft)
- Listing: Mountains of Alberta
- Coordinates: 53°02′17″N 118°19′50″W

Geography
- Country: Canada
- Province: Alberta
- Protected area: Jasper National Park
- Parent range: Victoria Cross Ranges
- Topo map: NTS 83E1 Snaring River

Snaring Mountain is the highest mountain in the Victoria Cross Ranges of Alberta, Canada. The peak was named for a local Indian tribe who used snares to trap small animals; the name became official in 1934.
