= Pyramid Mountain (Alberta) =

Mountain in Alberta, Canada

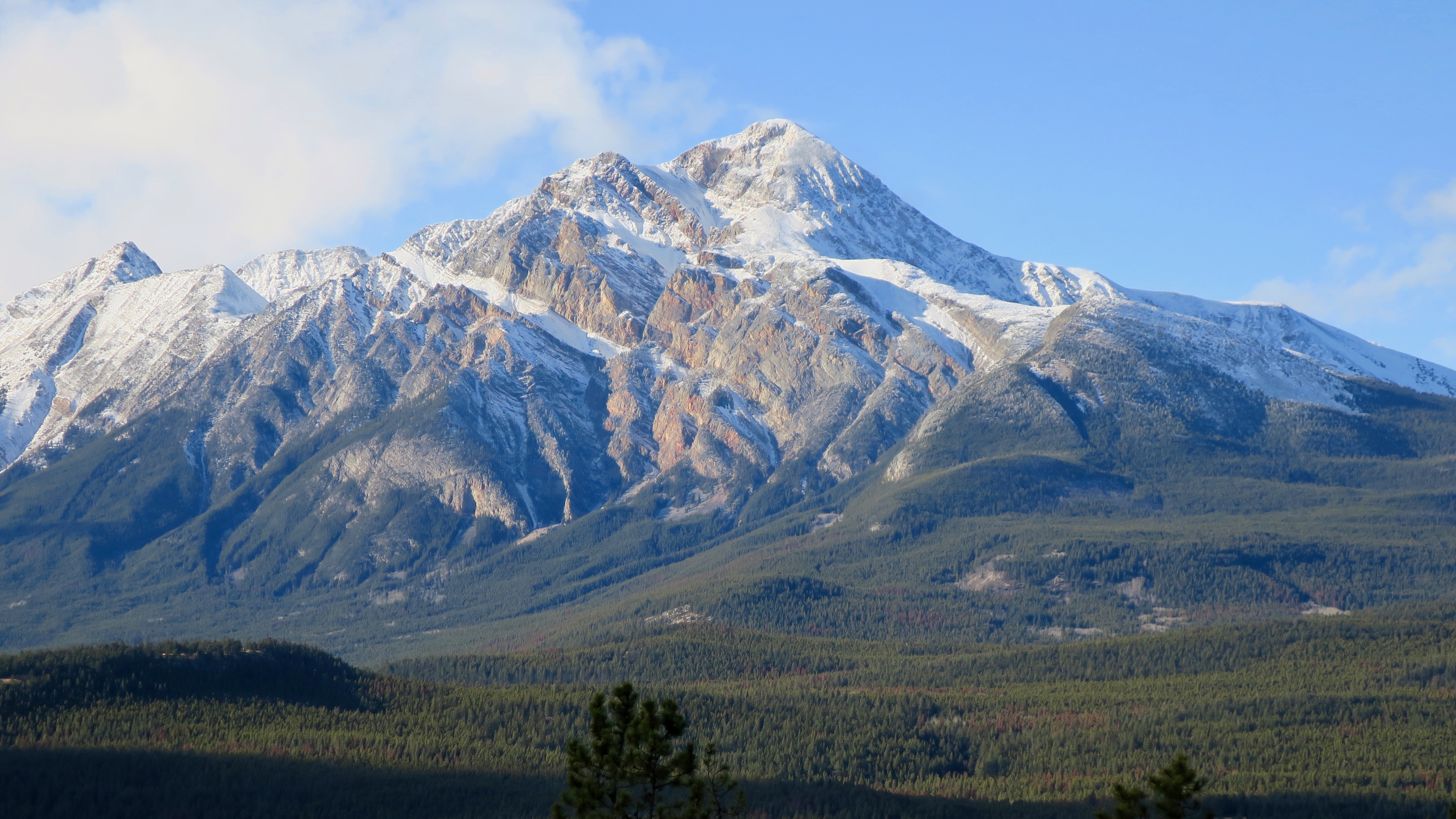
- Pyramid from Maligne Lookout

Highest point
- Elevation: 2,766 m (9,075 ft)
- Prominence: 761 m (2,497 ft)
- Listing: Mountains of Alberta
- Coordinates: 52°57′04″N 118°08′57″W

Geography
- Location within Alberta
- Location: Alberta, Canada
- Parent range: Victoria Cross Ranges
- Topo map: NTS 83D16 Jasper

Climbing
- First ascent: George Kinney, guided by Conrad Kain
- Easiest route: Scramble

Pyramid Mountain is a mountain in Jasper National Park, Alberta, Canada, named for its pyramid-like shape. James Hector named the mountain in 1859 due to its appearance from the Athabasca River valley on the eastern side of the peak.

Part of the Victoria Cross Ranges in the Athabasca River Valley the mountain is in the major headwaters for the Athabasca River. The peak is just under 10 km (6 mi) north-west of the town of Jasper.

The mountain is a relatively easy scramble on the eastern slopes. These slopes can be reached by following a steep fire road from the parking lot at Pyramid Lake, 11.5 km (7 mi) southeast of the peak.

Based on the Köppen climate classification, Pyramid Mountain is located in a subarctic climate zone with cold, snowy winters, and mild summers. Temperatures can drop below -20 °C with wind chill factors below -30 °C.

== Gallery ==
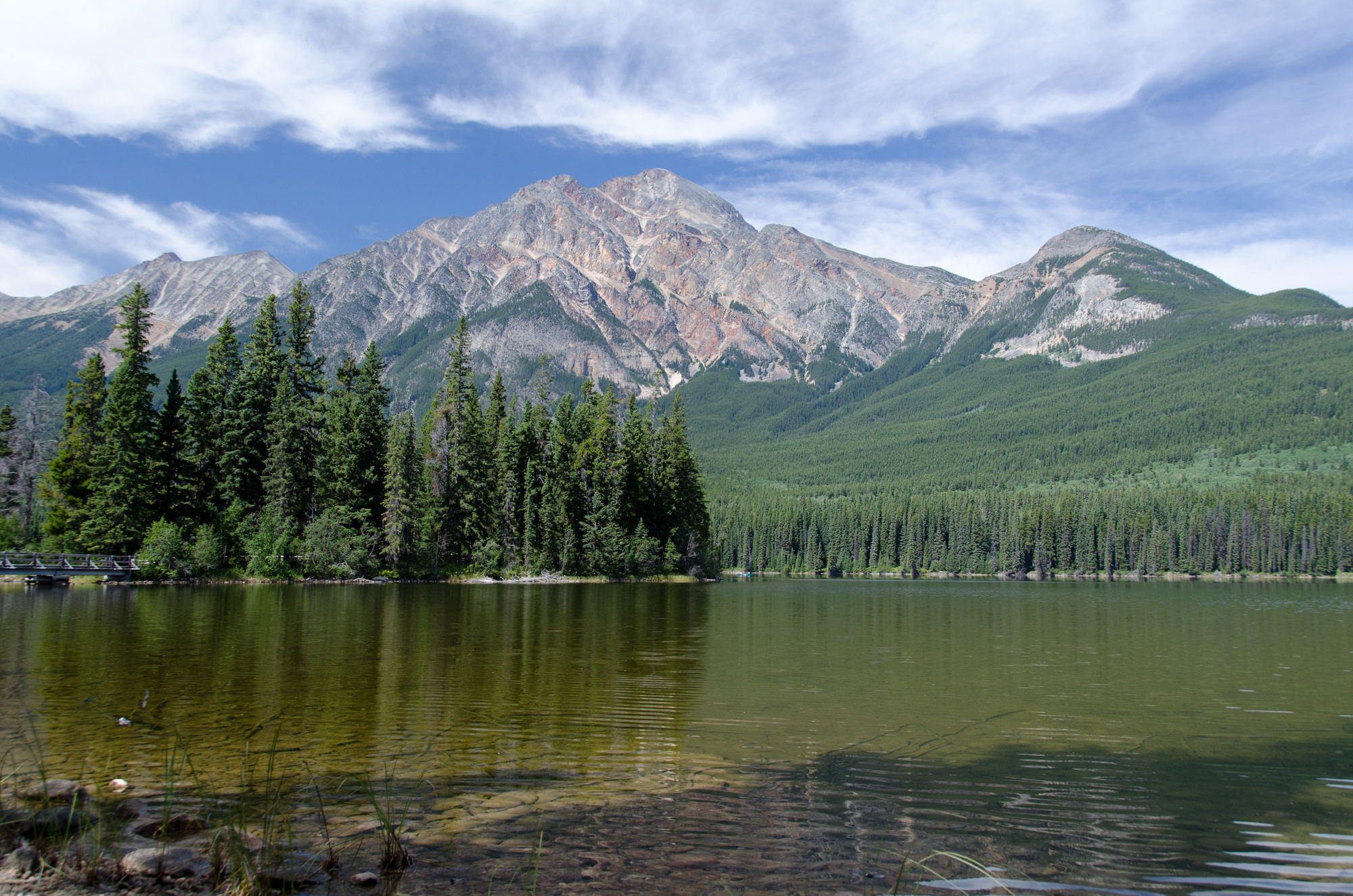
Pyramid Mountain from Pyramid Lake, August 2012

== See also ==
- Geography of Alberta
