= Snaring River =

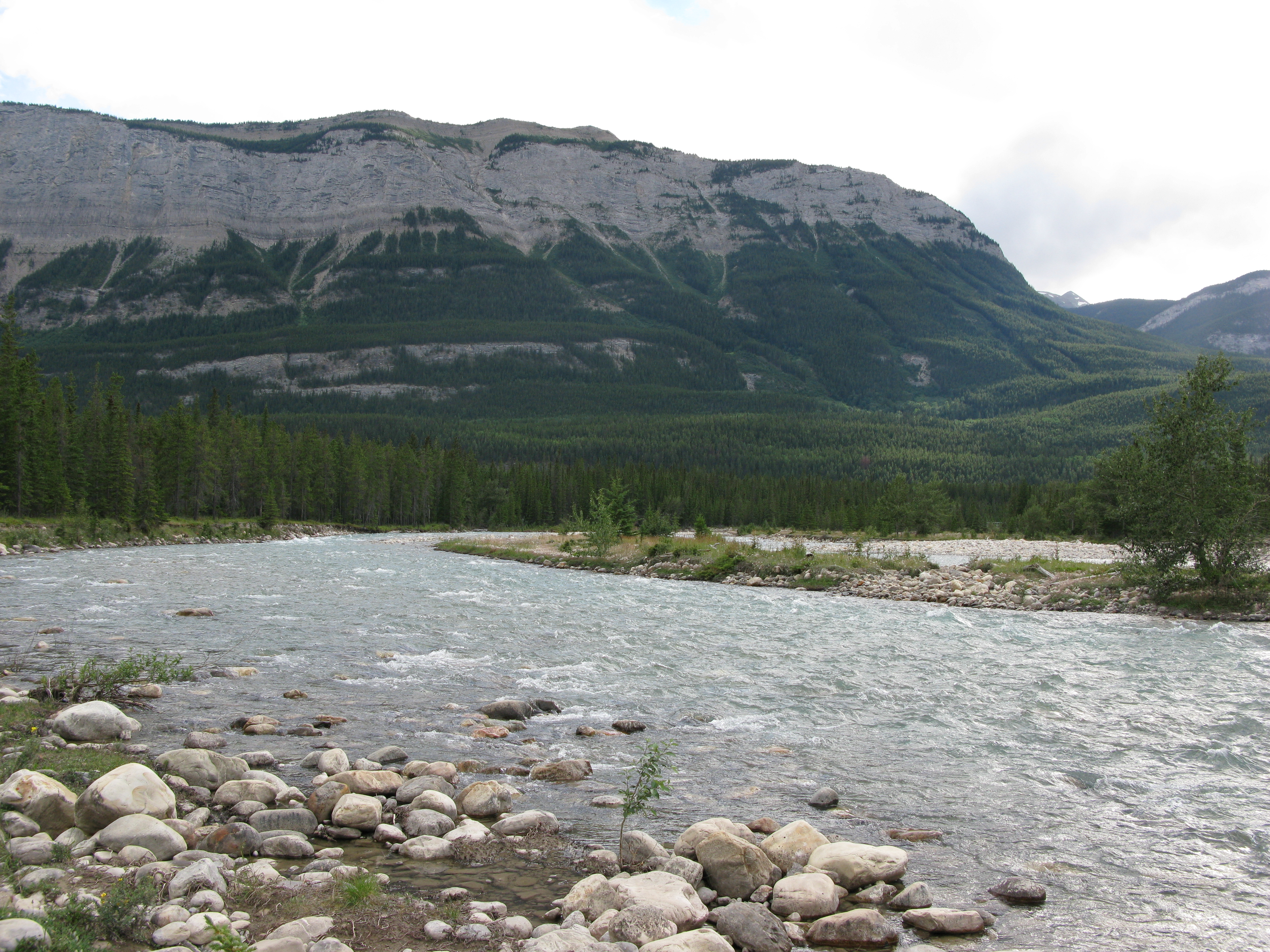
- The Snaring River in Jasper National Park

Location
- Country: Canada
- Province: Alberta

Physical characteristics
- Source
  - location: Colonel Pass
  - coordinates: 53°04′56″N 118°42′28″W
  - elevation: 1,084 m (3,556 ft)
- Mouth
  - location: Athabasca River
  - coordinates: 53°00′50″N 118°04′31″W
  - elevation: 1,039 m (3,409 ft)

The Snaring River is a medium-sized river in the Canadian Rockies. It runs through parts of Jasper National Park in Alberta, Canada. The Snaring River is a significant tributary of the Athabasca River. The Snaring is named after a former local tribe of first nations people who lived in dugouts and trapped animals with snares.

== Course ==
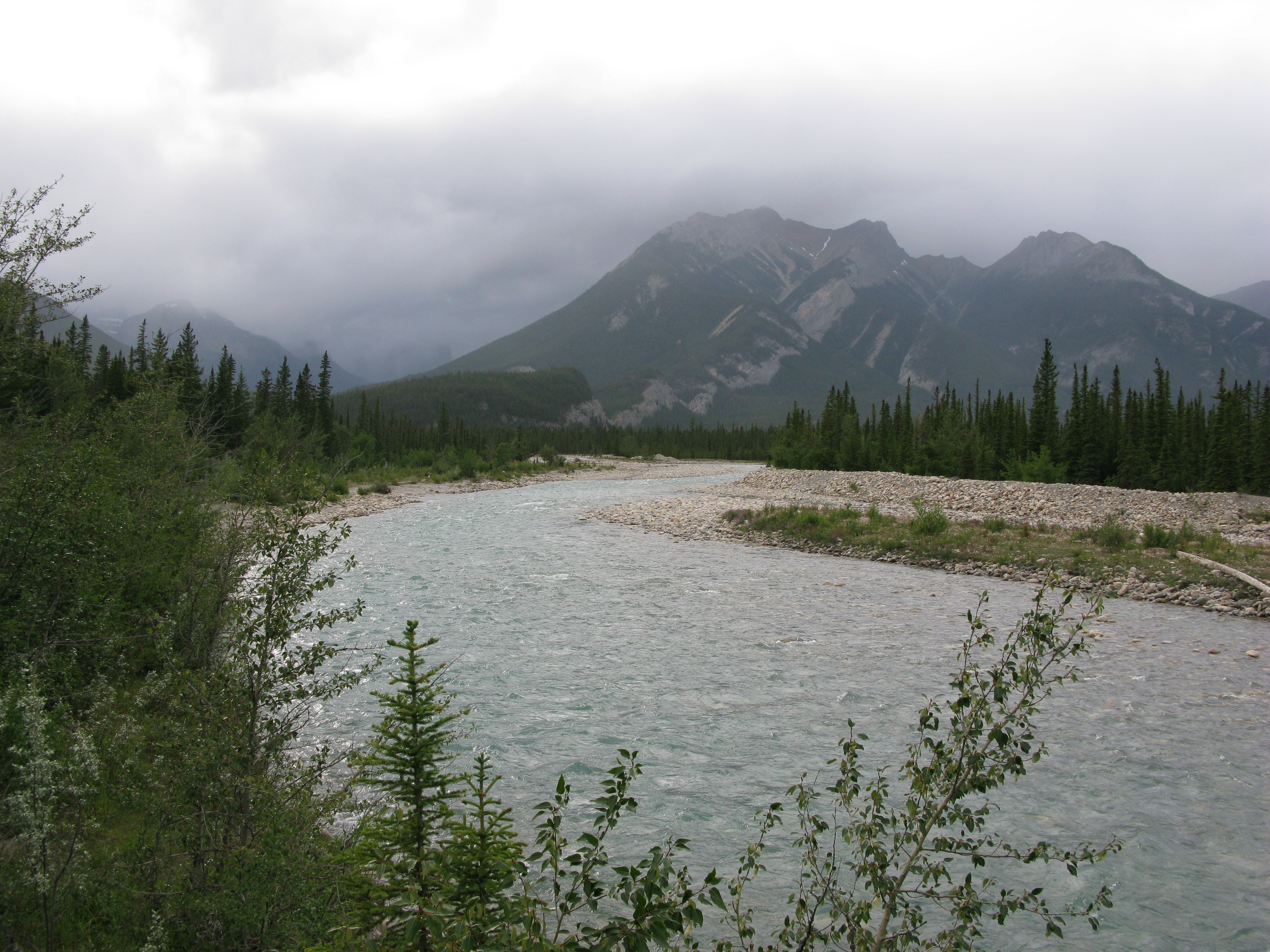
The Snaring River near its confluence with the Athabasca River

The Snaring River rises in the northwestern section of Jasper National Park, near the British Columbia border. It flows east-southeast before joining the Athabasca River. The Snaring is fed by meltwater of numerous peaks, including Mount McCord, Mount Beaupré, Mount Knight, Mount Rutherford, and Snaring Mountain. The small Harvey Lake also drains into the Snaring. A campground run by Parks Canada is on the Snaring near the Yellowhead Highway.

== See also ==
- List of rivers of Alberta
