= Miette River =

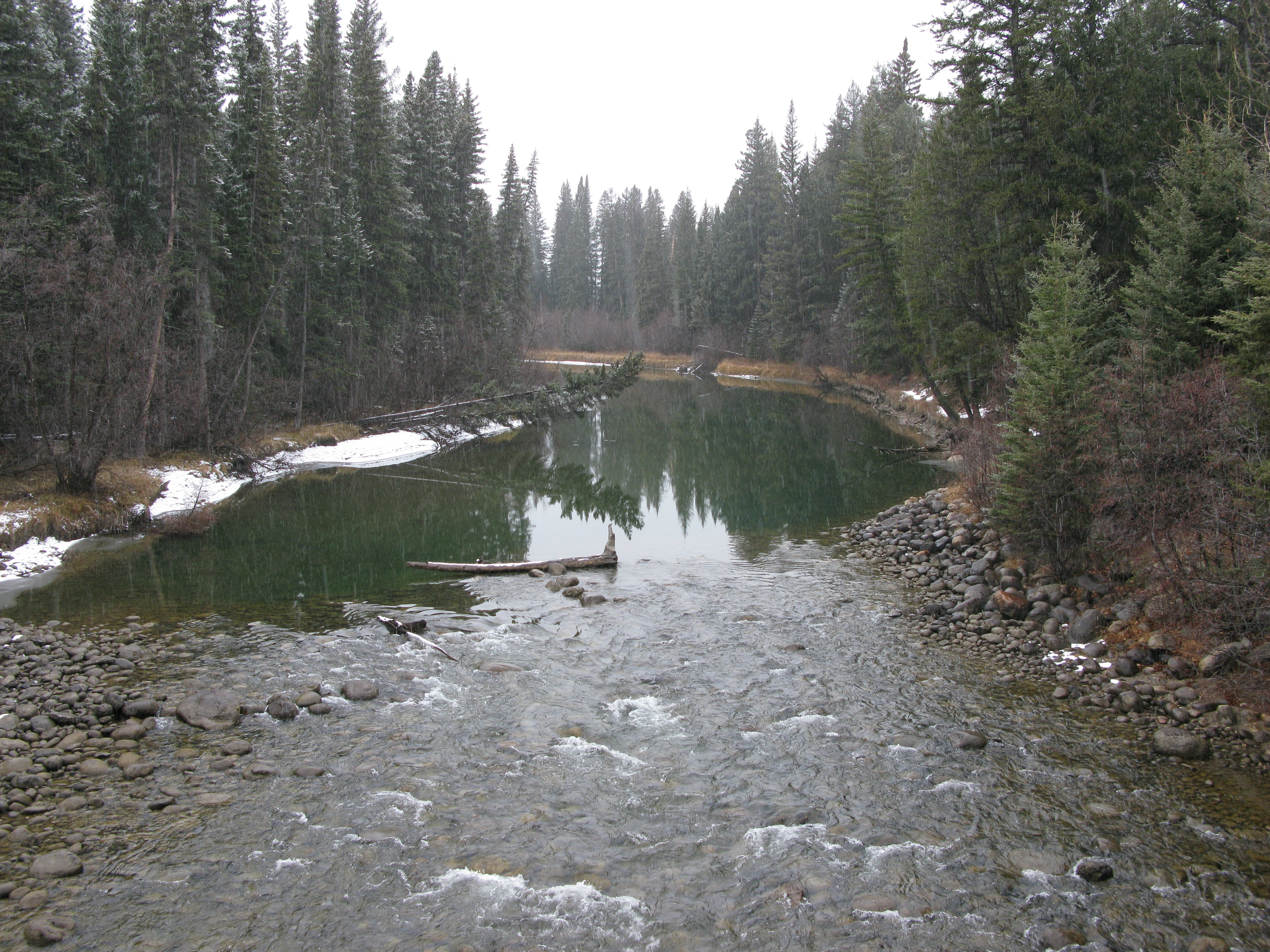
- The Miette River before its confluence with the Athabasca River

Location
- Country: Canada
- Province: Alberta

Physical characteristics
- Source
  - location: Miette Pass
  - coordinates: 52°57′18″N 118°35′02″W
  - elevation: 1,643 m (5,390 ft)
- Mouth
  - location: Athabasca River
  - coordinates: 52°51′55″N 118°04′12″W
  - elevation: 1,321 m (4,334 ft)

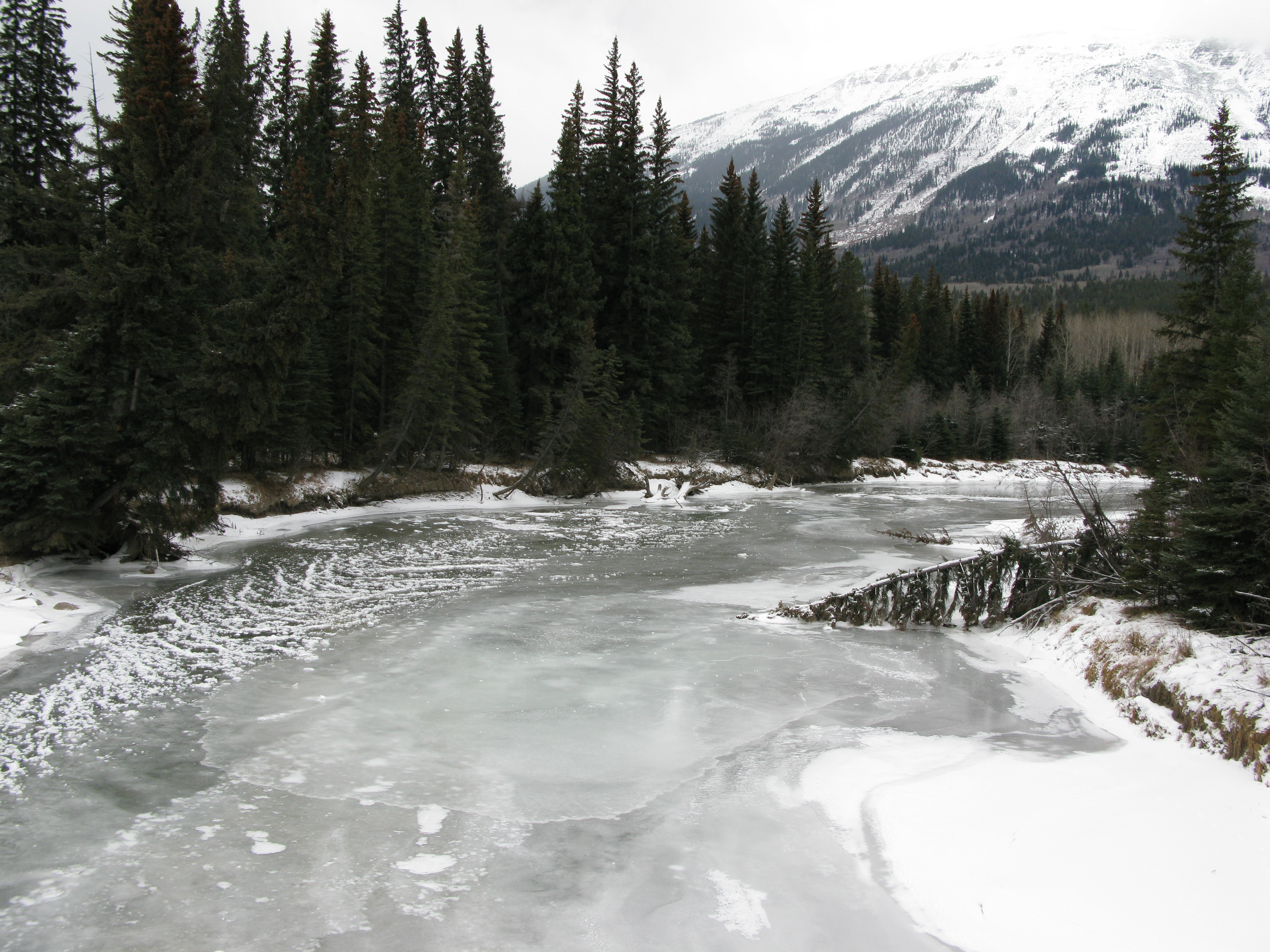
The Miette River before its confluence with the Athabasca River

The Miette River (/ˈmaɪ.ɛt/ or /maɪˈɛt/) is a short river in Jasper National Park, Alberta, Canada. It flows south-southeast through the Rocky Mountains before draining eastward into the Athabasca River at Jasper.

The Miette forms at the base of Mount Moren, with meltwater from Mount Bridgeland, Salient Mountain, Mount McCord, and Mount Beaupre contributing to the initial flow.

The Miette River, as well as various other geological features in Jasper National Park, are named after the Cree language word for bighorn sheep, ᒫᔭᑎᕁ mâyatihk.

The Miette River Trail runs along the Miette River. It goes for approximately 43.5 kilometres. The trail follows an abandoned railway for some of its distance. One of the landmarks on the trail is the Rink Cabin.

== Tributaries ==
- Rink Brook
- Clairvaux Creek
- Minaga Creek
- Muhigan Creek

== See also ==
- List of Alberta rivers
