= Survey Peak (Alberta) =

Mountain in Alberta, Canada

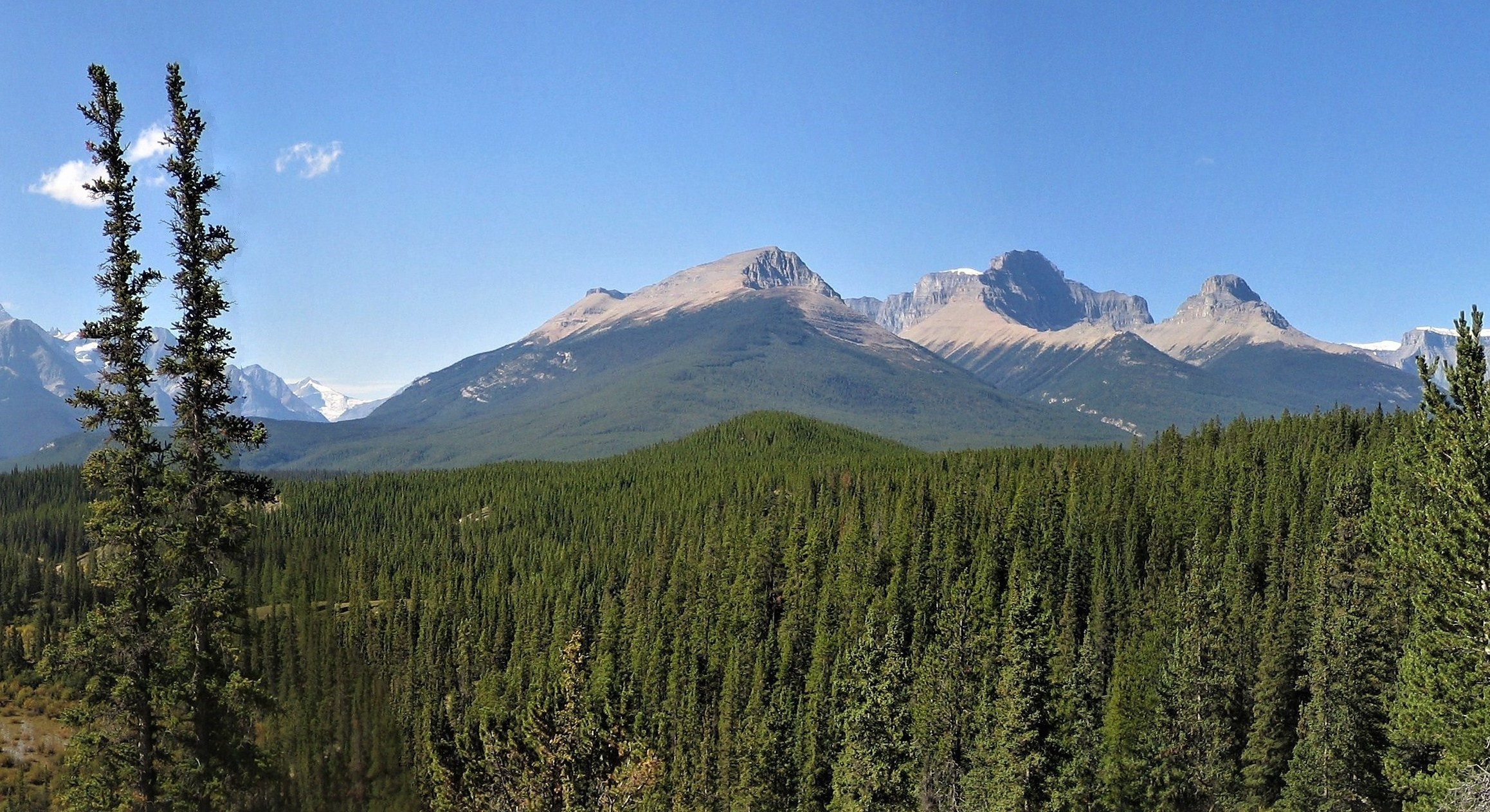
- East aspect, centered, from Icefields Parkway

Highest point
- Elevation: 2,667 m (8,750 ft)
- Prominence: 259 m (850 ft)
- Parent peak: Mount Forbes (3,612 m)
- Isolation: 2.33 km (1.45 mi)
- Listing: Mountains of Alberta
- Coordinates: 51°57′16″N 116°51′01″W

Geography
- Location within Alberta Location within Canada
- Interactive map of Survey Peak
- Country: Canada
- Province: Alberta
- Protected area: Banff National Park
- Parent range: Lyell Group; Canadian Rockies
- Topo map: NTS 82N15 Mistaya Lake

Geology
- Rock age: Cambrian
- Rock type: Sedimentary

Climbing
- First ascent: August 1898

Survey Peak is a 2,667-metre (8,750-foot) mountain summit in Alberta, Canada.

== Description ==
Survey Peak is located in the Canadian Rockies of Banff National Park. It is situated at the intersection of the North Saskatchewan River valley and Howse River valley. Topographic relief is modest as the summit rises 1,200 metres (3,937 ft) above Glacier Lake in 3 km (1.9 mi). The nearest higher named peak is Mount Erasmus, 4 km (2.5 mi) to the west. Survey Peak can be seen from the Icefields Parkway west of Saskatchewan Crossing. An ascent of the peak involves 1,400 metres of elevation gain covering 16 km round-trip distance, part of which is on the Glacier Lake Trail.

== History ==
The first ascent of the summit was made in August 1898 by J. Norman Collie and Hugh E.M. Stutfield. Collie so named the peak after conducting a plane table survey from the summit. The mountain's toponym was officially adopted on March 31, 1924, by the Geographical Names Board of Canada. A large forest fire in 1940 burned the slopes of Survey Peak, which can now be seen as two differently colored forests.

== Geology ==
Like other mountains in Banff Park, Survey Peak is composed of sedimentary rock laid down from the Precambrian to Jurassic periods. Formed in shallow seas, this sedimentary rock was pushed east and over the top of younger rock during the Laramide orogeny. The Survey Peak Formation is named after this peak.

== Climate ==
Based on the Köppen climate classification, Survey Peak is located in a subarctic climate zone with cold, snowy winters, and mild summers. Winter temperatures can drop below -20 °C with wind chill factors below -30 °C. Summer months offer the most favorable weather for climbing the peak, however snowshoeing in the spring is an option, albeit one with avalanche risk.

== See also ==
- Survey Peak Formation
- Geography of Alberta
