= Outram Formation =

Geologic formation in Canada

- Stratigraphic range: Early Ordovician ~485–470 Ma
- Type: Formation
- Underlies: Skoki Formation
- Overlies: Survey Peak Formation
- Thickness: Up to 443 metres (1453 ft)

Lithology
- Primary: Limestone, siltstone
- Other: Shale, chert

Location
- Coordinates: 51°52′54″N 116°52′31″W
- Region: Canadian Rockies
- Country: Canada

Type section
- Named for: Mount Outram
- Named by: J.D. Aitken and B.S. Norford

The Outram Formation is a stratigraphic unit of Early Ordovician age that is present on the western edge of the Western Canada Sedimentary Basin in the Canadian Rockies of Alberta and British Columbia. It was named for Mount Outram in Banff National Park by J.D. Aitken and B.S. Norford in 1967. The Outram Formation is fossiliferous and includes remains of trilobites and other marine invertebrates, as well as stromatolites and thrombolites.

== Lithology and deposition ==
The Outram Formation formed as a shallow and at times emergent marine shelf along the western shoreline of the North American Craton during Early Ordovician time. It consists primarily of nodular limestone, calcareous quartzose siltstone, limestone pebble-conglomerate, and brown shale. Nodules of grey chert occur throughout the formation.

== Distribution and stratigraphic relationships ==
The Outram is present in the Rocky Mountains of Alberta and British Columbia. Its thickness and shale content increase toward the west. It overlies the Survey Peak Formation and underlies the Skoki Formation. Both contacts are gradational.

== Paleontology ==
The Outram Formation contains several genera of trilobites, as well as brachiopods, conodonts, gastropods, sponges, echinoderms, bivalves, gastropods, stromatolites, thrombolites, oncolites, rare graptolites, and others.
