= Terminal Mountain =

Mountain in Alberta, Canada

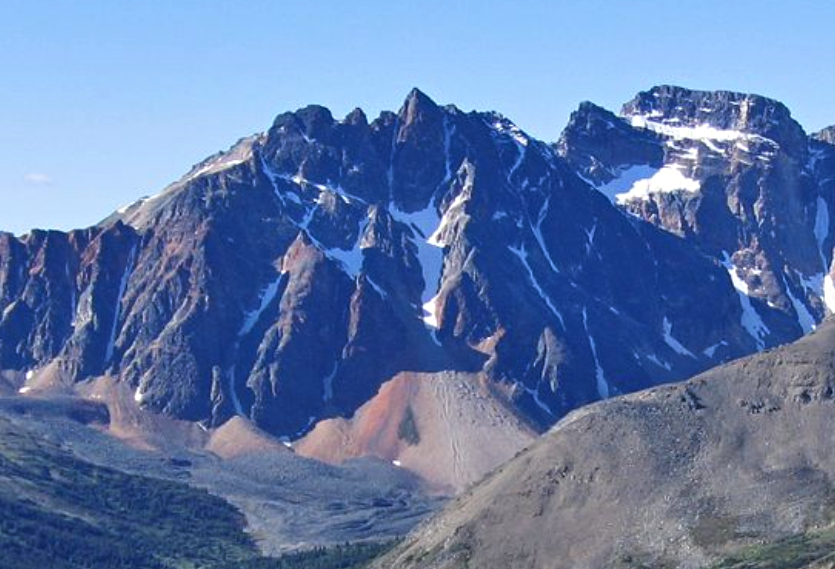
- Terminal Mountain seen from The Whistlers.

Highest point
- Elevation: 2,835 m (9,301 ft)
- Prominence: 105 m (344 ft)
- Parent peak: Manx Peak (3,044 m)
- Listing: Mountains of Alberta
- Coordinates: 52°46′42″N 118°09′37″W

Geography
- Location within Alberta Location within Canada
- Interactive map of Terminal Mountain
- Country: Canada
- Province: Alberta
- Protected area: Jasper National Park
- Parent range: Trident Range, Canadian Rockies
- Topo map: NTS 83D16 Jasper

Terminal Mountain is a 2,835-metre (9,301 ft) mountain summit located in Jasper National Park, in the Trident Range of the Canadian Rockies of Alberta, Canada. The town of Jasper is situated 12 kilometers to the north-northeast. Terminal Mountain forms the west buttress of Marmot Pass, and the east buttress is formed by Marmot Mountain, home of the Marmot Basin alpine ski area. Peveril Peak rises to the south across Circus Valley, and the north side towers above the valley of Whistlers Creek. The nearest higher neighbor is Manx Peak, 2.0 km (1.2 mi) to the west.

== History ==
The descriptive name Terminal was applied in 1916 by Morrison P. Bridgland (1878-1948), a Dominion Land Surveyor who named many peaks in Jasper Park and the Canadian Rockies. It appeared as Mt. Terminal, 9300 feet, in a 1921 book, "A Climber's Guide to the Rocky Mountains of Canada." The mountain's present toponym was officially adopted in 1951 by the Geographical Names Board of Canada.

== Climate ==
Based on the Köppen climate classification, Terminal Mountain is located in a subarctic climate zone with cold, snowy winters, and mild summers. Winter temperatures can drop below -20 °C with wind chill factors below -30 °C. Precipitation runoff from Terminal Mountain drains to the Athabasca River.

== Gallery ==
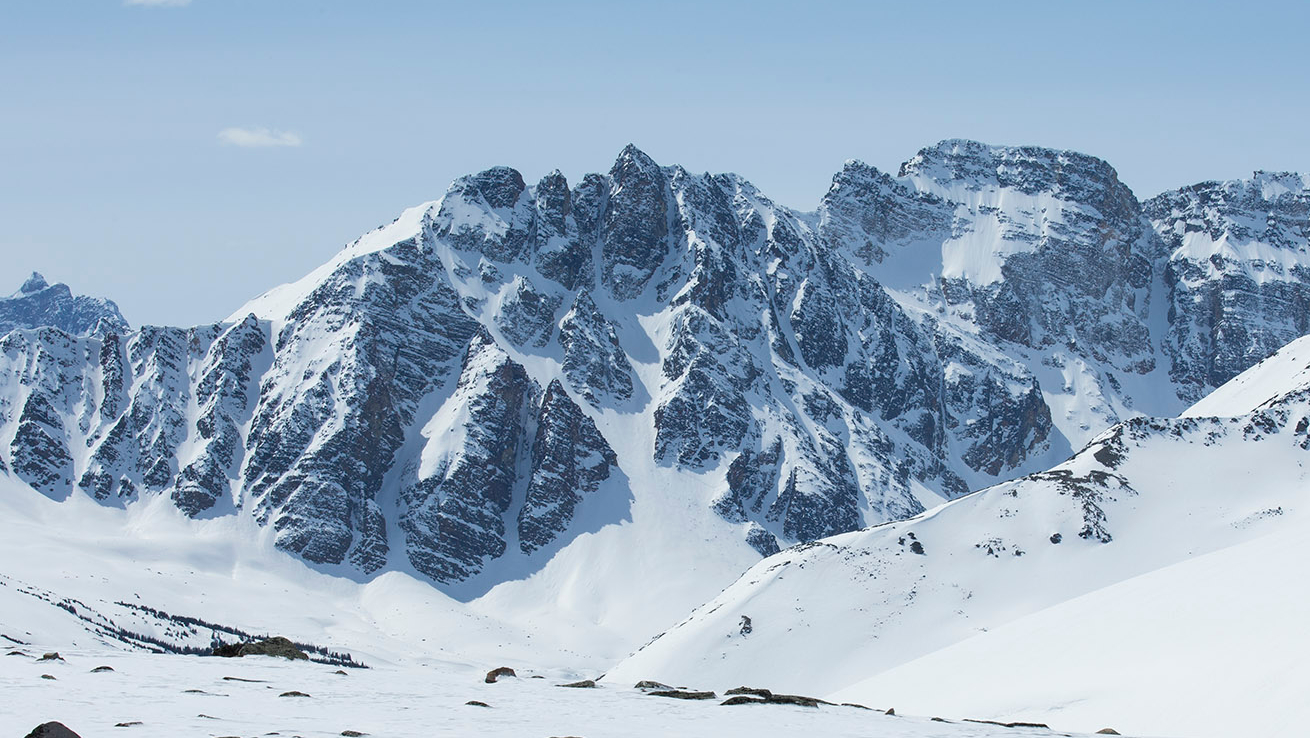
Terminal Mountain

== See also ==
- Geography of Alberta
