= Survey Peak Formation =

Stratigraphic Unit of latest Cambrian to Earliest Ordovician Age

- Stratigraphic range: latest Cambrian to earliest Ordovician ~490–475 Ma
- Type: Formation
- Underlies: Outram Formation
- Overlies: Mistaya Formation, Lynx Group
- Thickness: Up to 519 metres (17023 ft)

Lithology
- Primary: Limestone
- Other: Shale, mudstone, siltstone

Location
- Coordinates: 51°57′16.4″N 116°50′59″W
- Region: Canadian Rockies
- Country: Canada

Type section
- Named for: Survey Peak
- Named by: J.D. Aitken and B.S. Norford

The Survey Peak Formation is a stratigraphic unit of latest Cambrian to earliest Ordovician age. It is present on the western edge of the Western Canada Sedimentary Basin in the Canadian Rockies of Alberta and British Columbia. It was named for Survey Peak near Mount Erasmus in Banff National Park by J.D. Aitken and B.S. Norford in 1967. The Survey Peak Formation is fossiliferous and includes remains of trilobites and other marine invertebrates, as well as conodonts, stromatolites, and thrombolites.

== Lithology and deposition ==
The Survey Peak Formation formed as a shallow and at times emergent marine shelf along the western shoreline of the North American Craton during latest Cambrian to earliest Ordovician time. It consists of limestones, calcareous shales and mudstones, and siltstones, and can be subdivided into four informal members: a basal siltstone, overlain in turn by a putty-colored calcareous shale, a limestone and shale unit, and a massive, cliff-forming limestone.

== Distribution and stratigraphic relationships ==
The Survey Peak Formation is present in the Rocky Mountains of Alberta and British Columbia. It thickens westward. It overlies the Mistaya Formation or the top of the Lynx Group, and is overlain by the Outram Formation. The basal contact is conformable but abrupt. The top contact is gradational.

== Paleontology ==
The Survey Peak Formation is considered to be one of the best exposed and most accessible fossiliferous examples of the Cambrian-Ordovician boundary in Canada. It includes several genera of trilobites, as well as brachiopods, conodonts, gastropods, echinoderms, stromatolites, thrombolites, rare graptolites, and others.
