= Marmot Mountain =

Mountain in Jasper National Park, Alberta, Canada

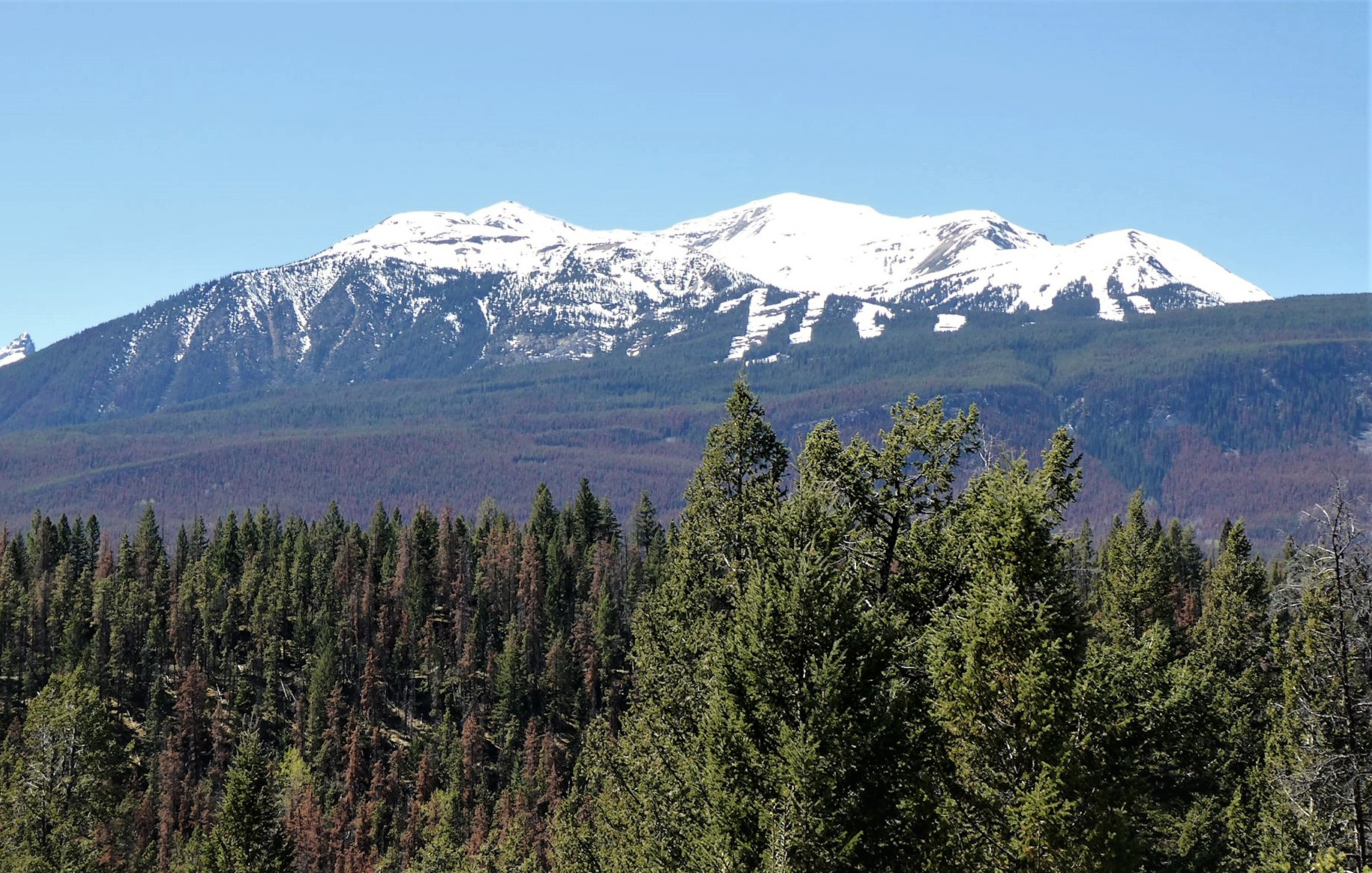
- East aspect

Highest point
- Elevation: 2,608 m (8,556 ft)
- Prominence: 338 m (1,109 ft)
- Isolation: 2.58 km (1.60 mi)
- Listing: Mountains of Alberta
- Coordinates: 52°47′24″N 118°07′36″W

Naming
- Etymology: Marmot

Geography
- Location within Alberta Location within Canada
- Interactive map of Marmot Mountain
- Country: Canada
- Province: Alberta
- Protected area: Jasper National Park
- Parent range: Trident Range; Canadian Rockies
- Topo map: NTS 83D16 Jasper

Marmot Mountain is a 2,608-metre (8,556-foot) mountain summit located in Alberta, Canada.

== Description ==
Marmot Mountain is set within Jasper National Park, in the Trident Range of the Canadian Rockies. The town of Jasper is situated 10 kilometres (6.2 mi) to the north and the Continental Divide is 15 kilometres (9.3 mi) to the west. The nearest higher neighbor is Terminal Mountain, 3.1 km (1.9 mi) to the southwest. Precipitation runoff from Marmot Mountain drains into Portal Creek and Whistlers Creek which are both tributaries of the Athabasca River. Topographic relief is modest as the summit rises 1,550 meters (5,085 feet) above the Athabasca Valley in six kilometers (3.7 miles). The mountain was named in 1916 and the toponym was officially adopted February 7, 1951, by the Geographical Names Board of Canada. The name refers to the marmot, which are large ground squirrels which inhabit the slopes. The Whistlers, Siffleur Mountain and Arctomys Peak also owe their names to the marmot, an indication that the animal was a favorite of the early explorers in Alberta.

== Climate ==
Based on the Köppen climate classification, Marmot Mountain is located in a subarctic climate zone with cold, snowy winters, and mild summers. Winter temperatures can drop below -20 °C with wind chill factors below -30 °C. This climate supports the Marmot Basin ski area on the eastern slopes.

== Geology ==
The mountain is composed of sedimentary rock laid down during the Precambrian to Jurassic periods and pushed east and over the top of younger rock during the Laramide orogeny.

== Gallery ==
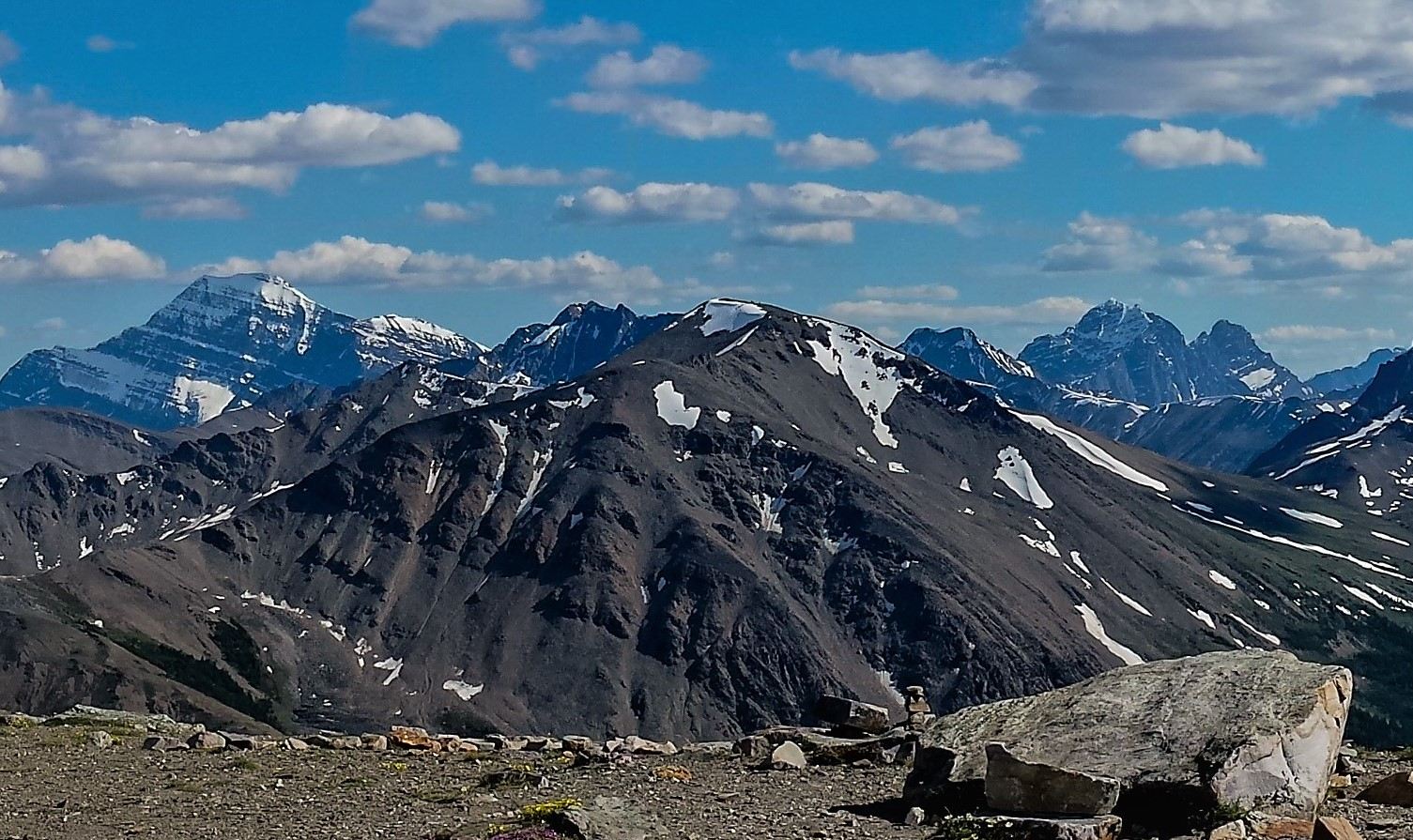
Marmot's north aspect centered, seen from The Whistlers.
Mt. Edith Cavell to left, Throne Mountain to right.

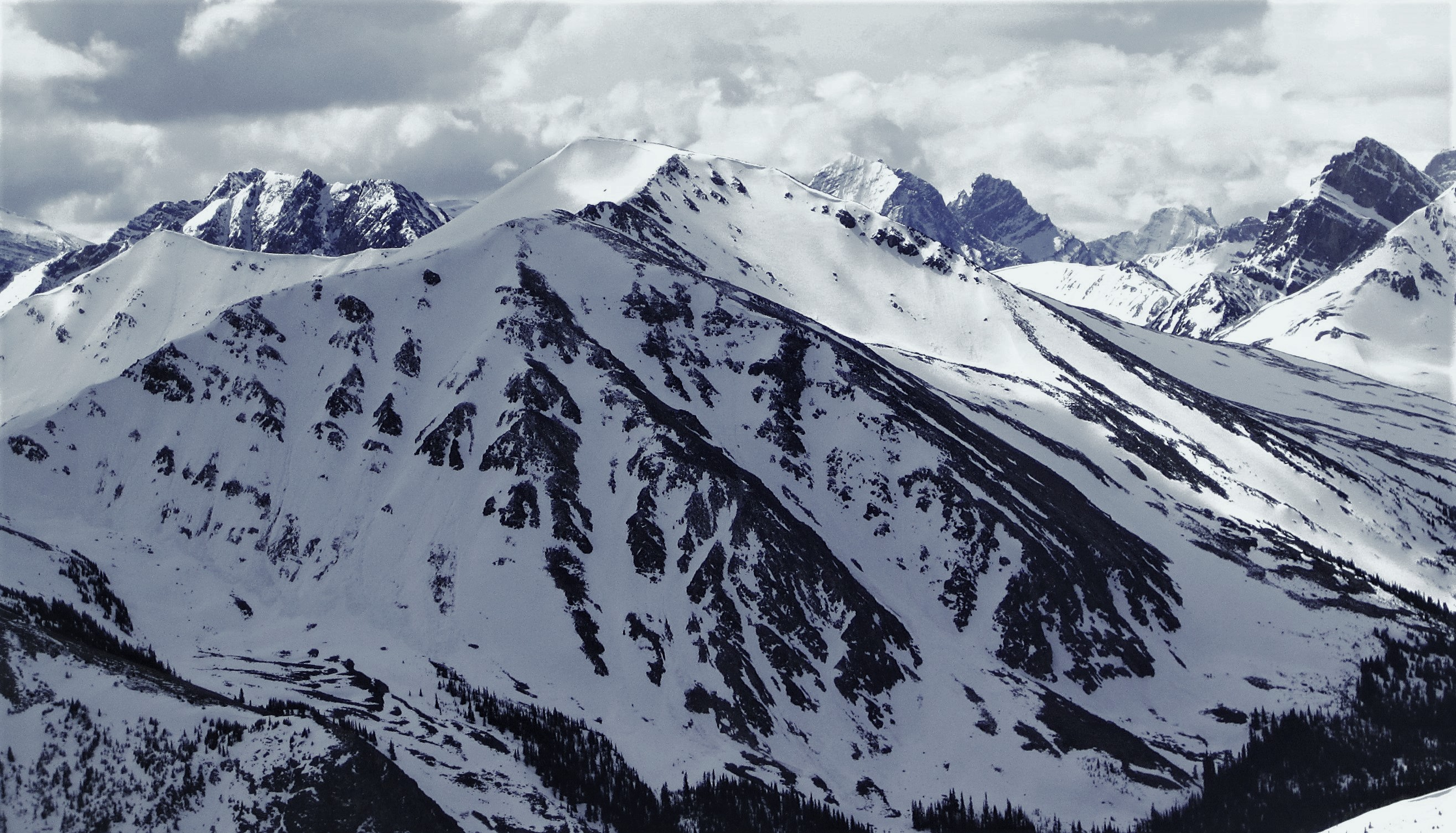
Marmot's north aspect centered, seen from The Whistlers.
Peveril Peak is dark summit to right.

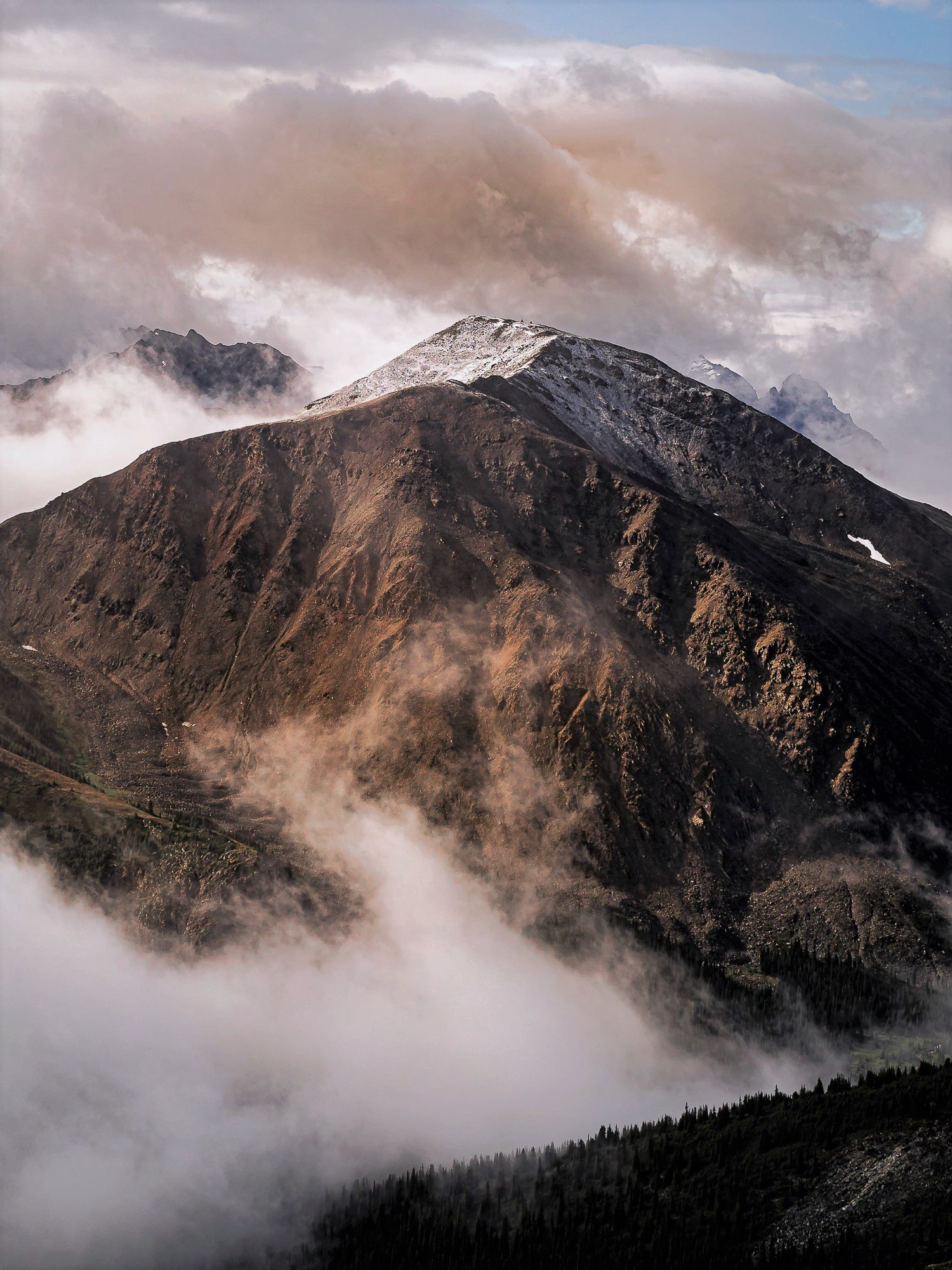
Marmot Mountain from The Whistlers

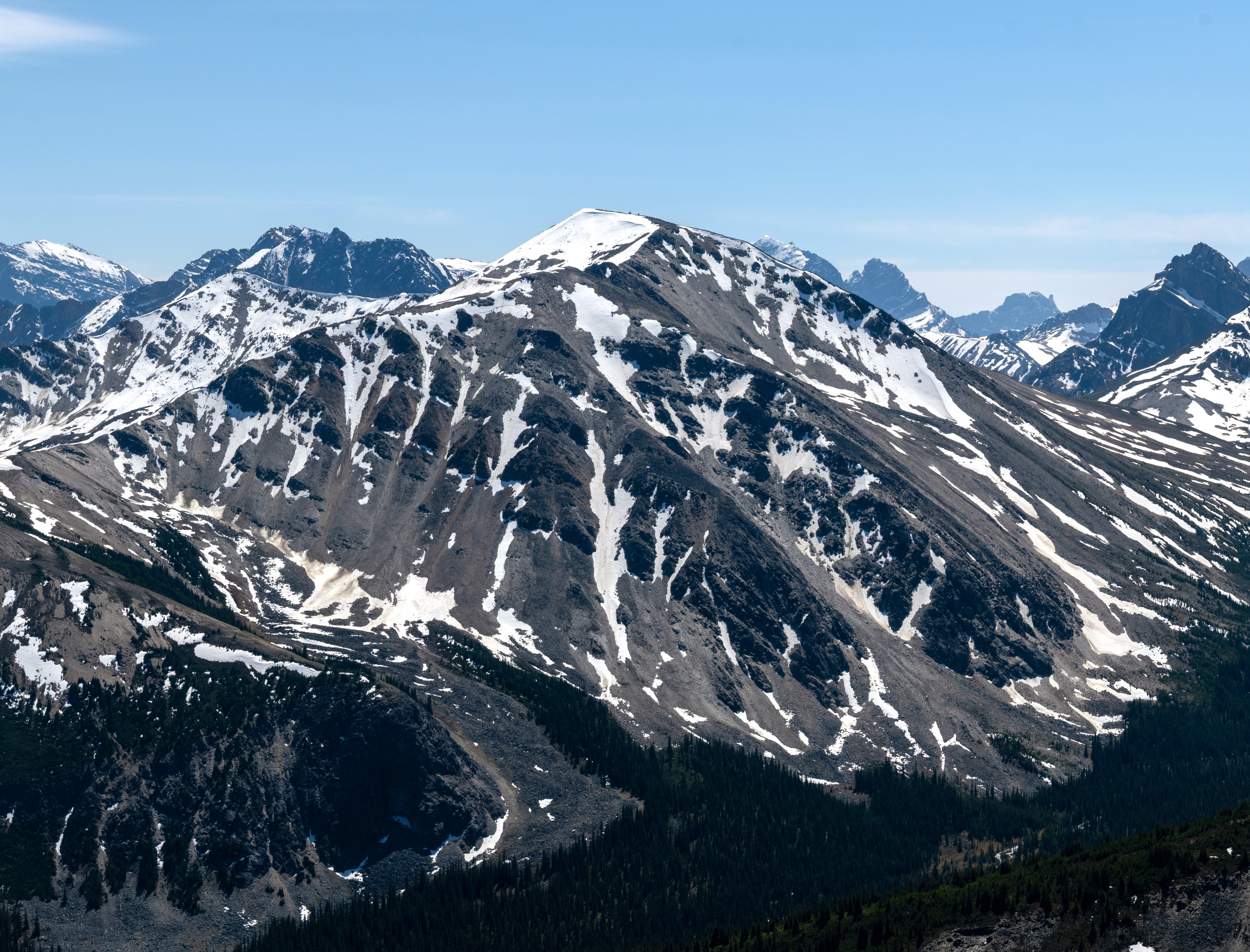
Marmot's north aspect centered, seen from The Whistlers.

== See also ==
- Geography of Alberta
