= Glacier Lake (Alberta) =

Lake in Banff NP, Alberta, Canada

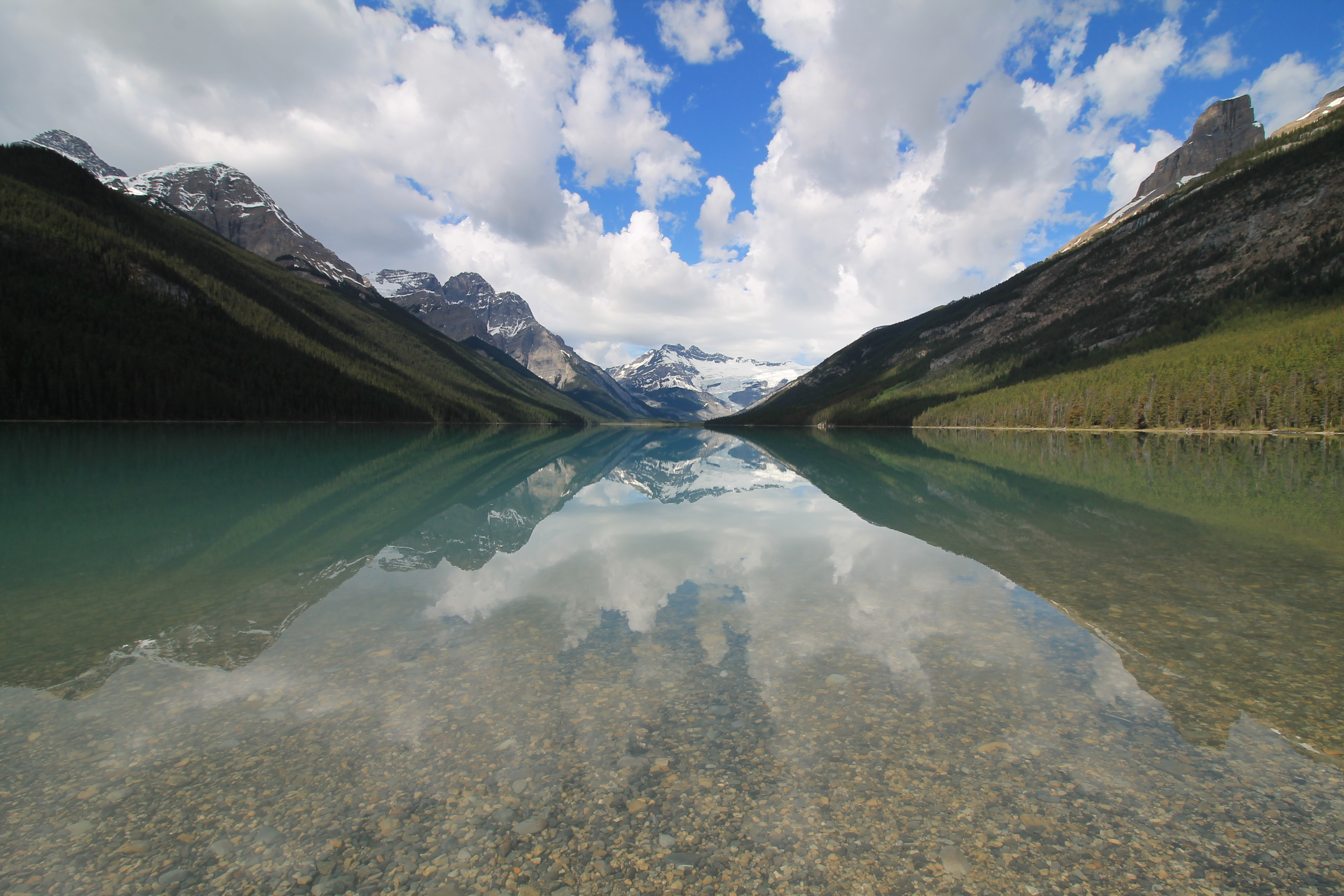

- Location within Alberta
- Location: Alberta, Canada
- Coordinates: 51°55′14″N 116°51′32″W
- Type: Glacial lake
- Primary inflows: Glacier River
- Primary outflows: Glacier River
- Basin countries: Canada
- Managing agency: Parks Canada
- Max. length: 3.85 km (2.39 mi)
- Max. width: 0.75 km (0.47 mi)
- Surface elevation: 1,480 metres (4,860 ft)

Glacier Lake is the fourth largest lake in Banff National Park, in Alberta, Canada.

Glacier Lake was named by Sir James Hector of the Palliser expedition in 1858 for the fact the lake is fed from glaciers, specifically the glaciers of the Lyell and Mons Icefields as well as the Forbes North Glacier. The lake is surrounded by Mount Outram, Division Mountain, Mount Erasmus and Survey Peak. The lake is fed and discharged by the Glacier River, which is a tributary of the Howse River. The lake can be accessed via a 8.9 kilometres (5.5 miles) trail which starts near Saskatchewan River Crossing along the Icefields Parkway. Park at the Glacier Lake trailhead (at the end of a short unnamed road 1.1 km (0.7 mi) west of the David Thompson Highway turn-off).

== Climate ==
Based on the Köppen climate classification, the lake experiences a subarctic climate with cold, snowy winters, and mild summers. Temperatures can drop below -20 °C with wind chill factors below -30 °C in the winter.

== See also ==
- List of lakes of Alberta
