= Mount Outram =

Mountain in Banff NP, Alberta, Canada

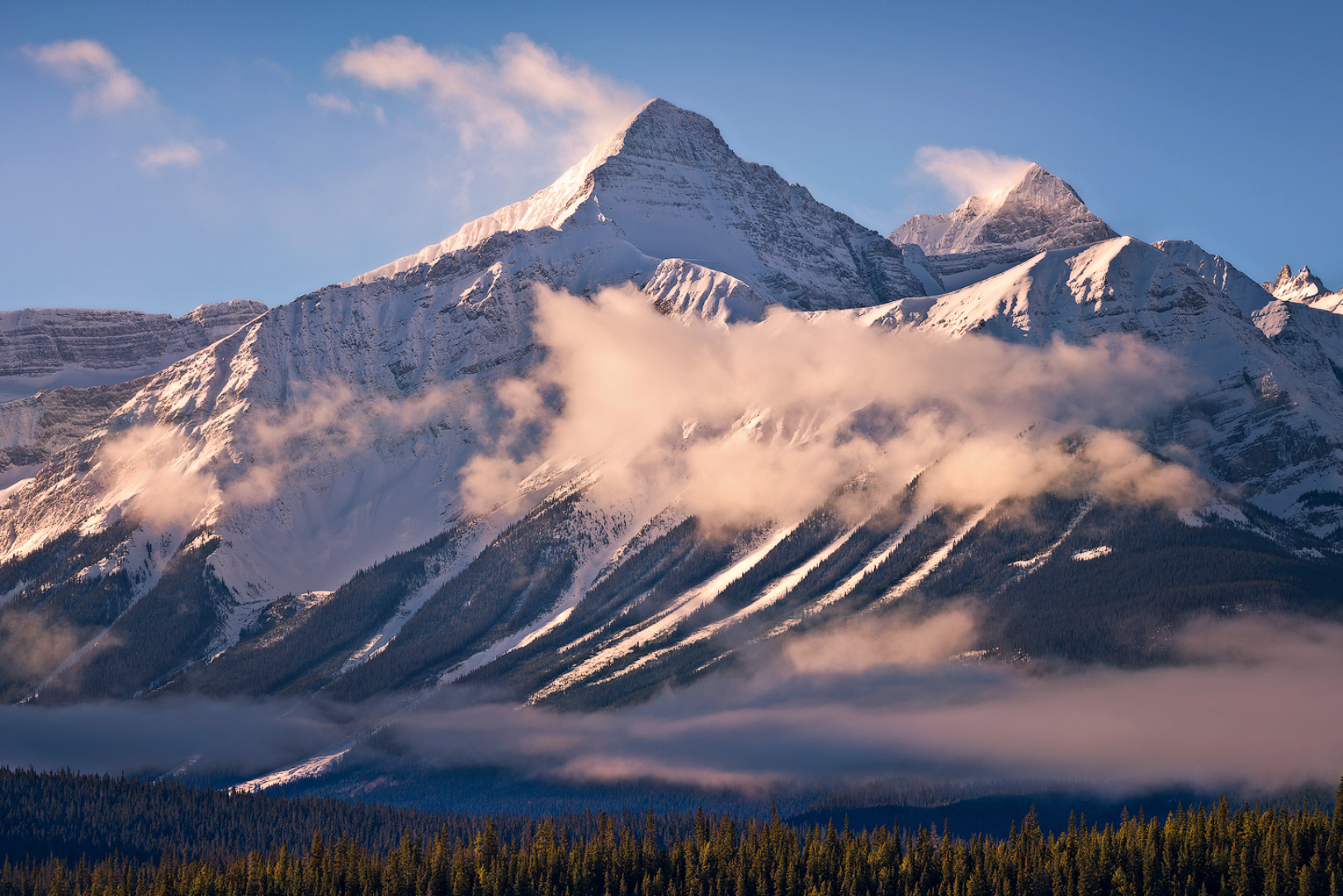
- Mount Outram seen from the Icefields Parkway

Highest point
- Elevation: 3,245 m (10,646 ft)
- Prominence: 735 m (2,411 ft)
- Parent peak: Mount Forbes (3,617 m)
- Listing: Mountains of Alberta
- Coordinates: 51°52′54″N 116°52′31″W

Geography
- Location within Alberta Location within Canada
- Interactive map of Mount Outram
- Location: Alberta, Canada
- Parent range: Forbes Group, Central Icefields; Canadian Rockies
- Topo map: NTS 82N15 Mistaya Lake

Geology
- Rock type: Sedimentary

Climbing
- First ascent: 1924 F.V. Field, W.0. Field, L. Harris, Edward Feuz Jr, J. Biner.
- Easiest route: Mountaineering

Mount Outram is a 3,245-metre (10,646-foot) mountain summit located in the Howse River Valley of Banff National Park, in the Canadian Rockies of Alberta, Canada. Its nearest higher peak is Mount Forbes, 4.37 km (2.72 mi) to the southwest. Glacier Lake is situated 4.0 km (2.5 mi) to the north, and the Sir James Glacier lies below the south aspect of the peak. Mount Outram can be seen from the Icefields Parkway southwest of Saskatchewan Crossing, with optimum photography conditions in morning light.

== History ==
Mount Outram was named in 1920 for James Outram (1864-1925), a mountaineer who made numerous first ascents in the Canadian Rockies including Mount Assiniboine, Chancellor Peak, Cathedral Mountain, and Mount Wilson.

The first ascent of the mountain was made in 1924 by F.V. Field, his brother W.O. Field, and L. Harris, with guides Edward Feuz Jr. and Joseph Biner.

The mountain's name was officially adopted in 1924 by the Geographical Names Board of Canada.

== Geology ==
Like other mountains in Banff Park, Mount Outram is composed of sedimentary rock laid down from the Precambrian to Jurassic periods. Formed in shallow seas, this sedimentary rock was pushed east and over the top of younger rock during the Laramide orogeny.

== Climate ==
Based on the Köppen climate classification, Mount Outram is located in a subarctic climate zone with cold, snowy winters, and mild summers. Winter temperatures can drop below -20 °C with wind chill factors below -30 °C. In terms of favorable weather conditions, summer months are best for climbing. Precipitation runoff from Mount Outram drains into tributaries of the Howse River.

== Gallery ==
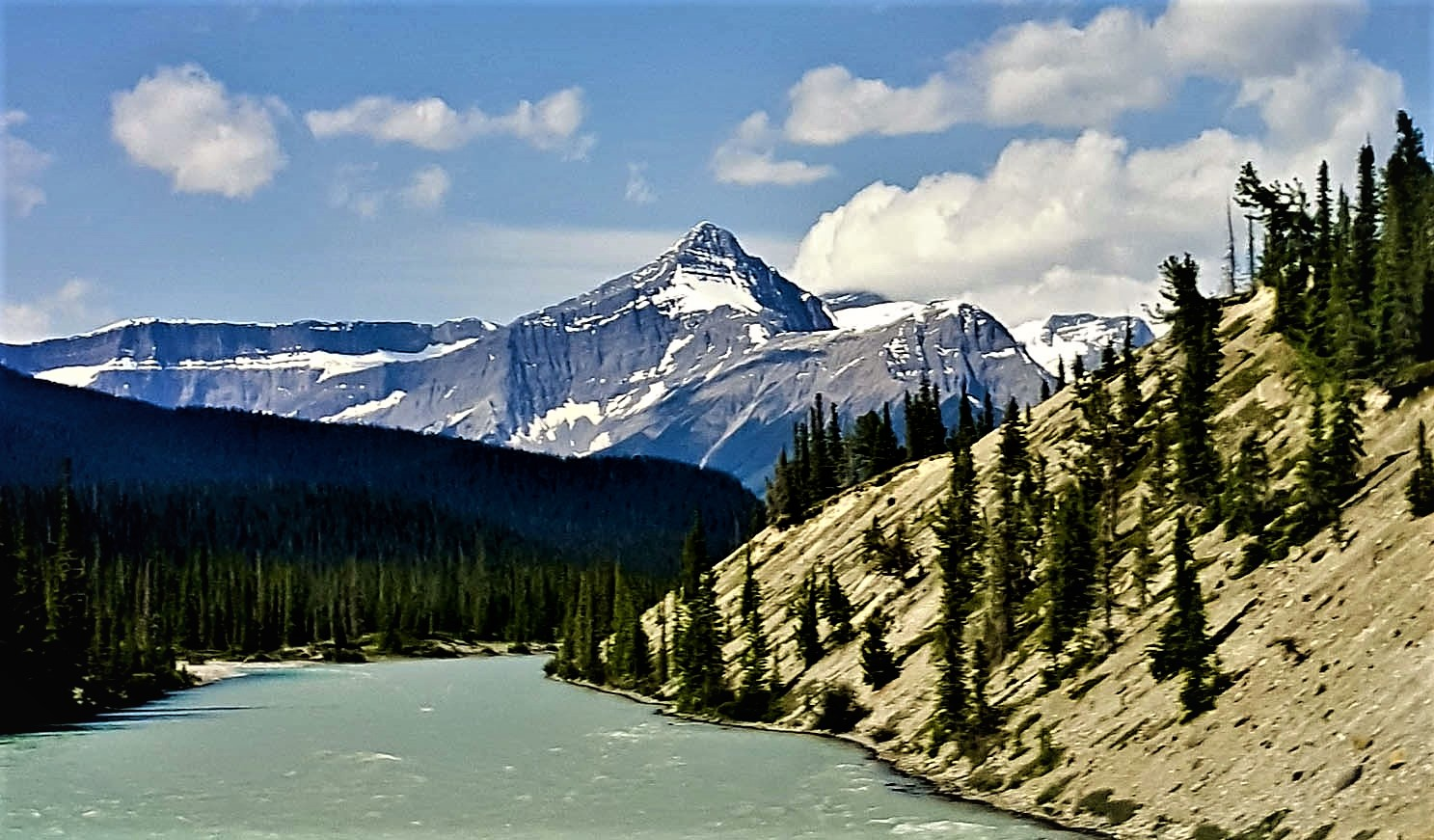
Mount Outram

== See also ==
- List of mountains of Alberta
- Geography of Alberta
