= Mount Forbes =

Mountain in Banff NP, Canada

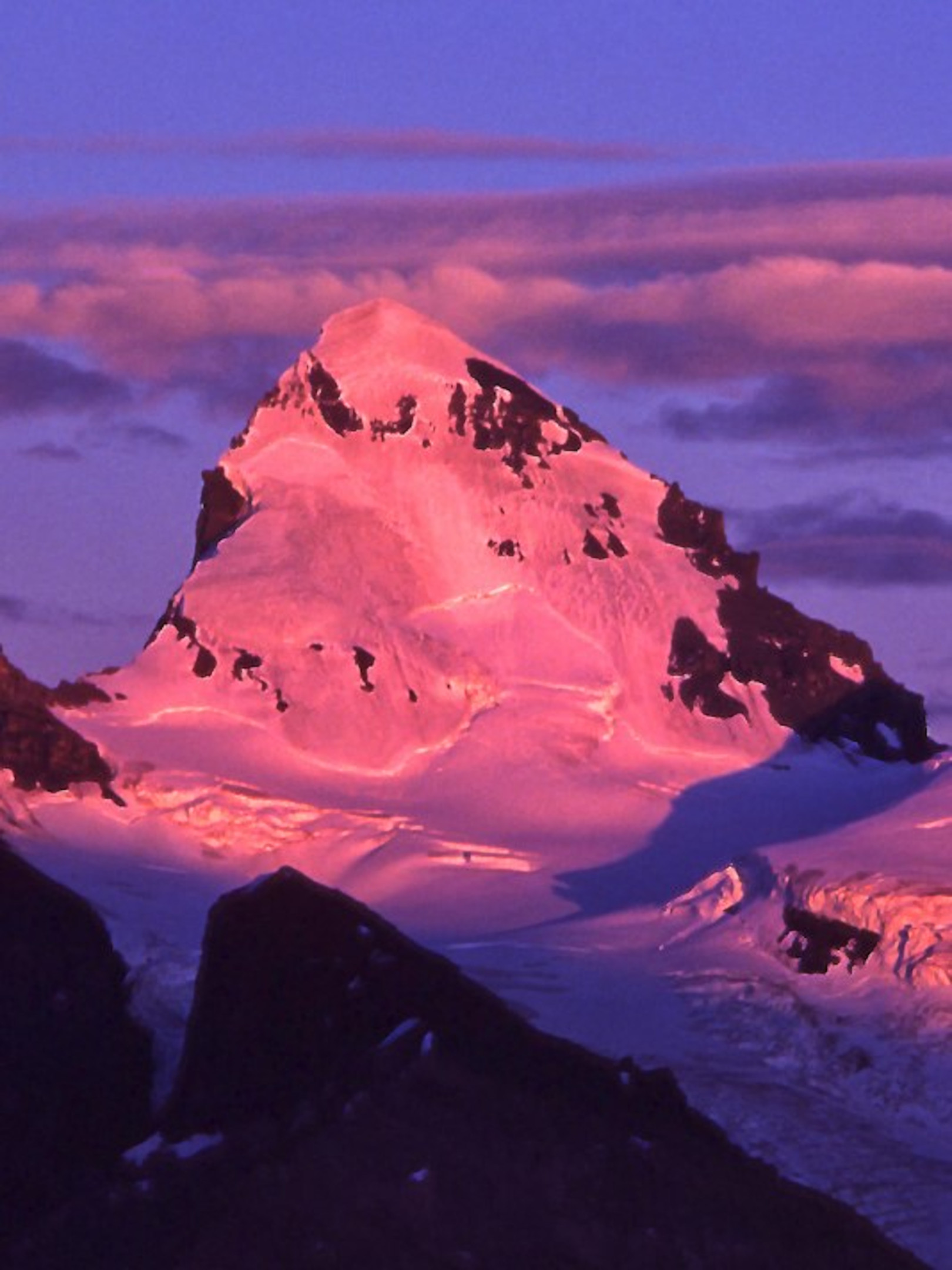
- Mount Forbes in alpenglow, from Arctomys Peak

Highest point
- Elevation: 3,612 m (11,850 ft)
- Prominence: 1,629 m (5,344 ft)
- Parent peak: Mount Columbia (3747 m)
- Listing: Mountains of Alberta; Canada highest major peaks 35th; Canada prominent peaks 94th
- Coordinates: 51°51′35″N 116°55′54″W

Geography
- Location within Alberta
- Country: Canada
- Province: Alberta
- Protected area: Banff National Park
- Parent range: Canadian Rockies
- Topo map: NTS 82N15 Mistaya Lake

Climbing
- First ascent: 10 August 1902 by Christian and Hans Kaufmann, J. Norman Collie, James Outram, et al.
- Easiest route: rock/snow climb

Mount Forbes is the seventh tallest mountain in the Canadian Rockies and the tallest within the boundaries of Banff National Park. It is located in southwestern Alberta, 18 km (11 mi) southwest of the Saskatchewan River Crossing in Banff. The mountain was named by James Hector in 1859 after Edward Forbes, Hector's natural history professor at the University of Edinburgh during the mid-19th century.

Mount Forbes was first ascended on August 10, 1902, by the Swiss brothers Christian and Hans Kaufmann, guiding the British gentlemen J. Norman Collie, James Outram, Hugh E.M. Stutfield, George M. Weed, and Herman Woolley. The shark tooth-shaped peak can be "predominantly seen from many parts of the range. The normal route, the NW face and the N Ridge all are well worth climbing."

== Climbing routes ==
There are several climbing routes for Mount Forbes, including:

- West Ridge (Normal Route) III
- North-West Face Variation III
- West Ridge of Rosita III 5.3

The most common approach route for Mount Forbes is from the Alberta side, starting at the Icefields Parkway. Park at the Glacier Lake trailhead (at the end of a short unnamed road 1.1 kilometres (0.68 mi) west of the David Thompson Highway turn-off), and follow the trail to the head of Glacier Lake (13 km (8 mi)). From there follow the old trail up the north bank of the Glacier River to the large open basin at the head of the river. Ford the Glacier River. Find the climbers trail ascending the timbered knob at the south end of the basin. Follow this trail as it climbs steeply up the knob then crosses to the west and climbs improbably up toward cliffs to the west. Eventually one climbs above the canyon and then makes the drop slightly to the edge of the Mons Glacier. Camps can be made here or at the foot of the North Glacier of Mt. Forbes. From here, the peak can be climbed in a reasonable day. The approach takes 4 to 6 hours.

A faster and shorter approach is from the west via recent logging roads starting north of Golden. The 4–6 hour approach mentioned above has become much longer due to deteriorating trails, and also involves cold river crossing. Many parties take two days using this approach. For a faster approach start on the Bush logging road and follow this until 68 km (42 mi). Here turn right on the Vallenciennes Road to 13 km (8 mi) where one follows the left fork up the Mons road. Park just past 23 km (14 mi) beside Icefall Brook. From here a trail ascends 350 m (1,148 ft) up a gravel slope, where it traverses north on ledges above the Icefall Canyon. This ledge is on the west side of Mons Peak. After traversing for 1 km (1 mi), the open meadows and moraines below the Mons Glacier are reached. From a camp here Mt. Forbes can be climbed in a day. This approach is 4 km (2 mi) long, climbs 1,000 m (3,281 ft), and can be done in 3 to 4 hours.

== Gallery ==
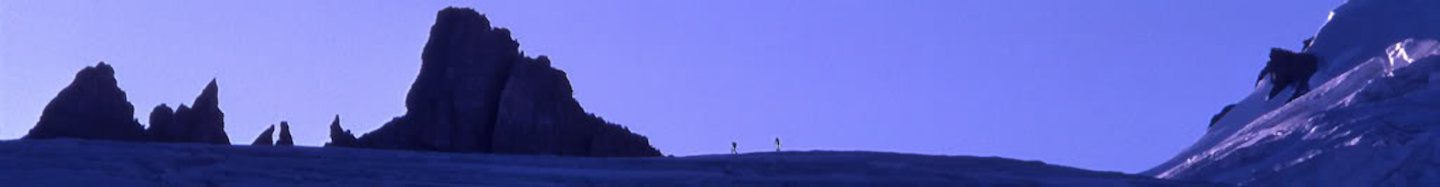
Mount Forbes Aiguille and the Forbes' North Glacier

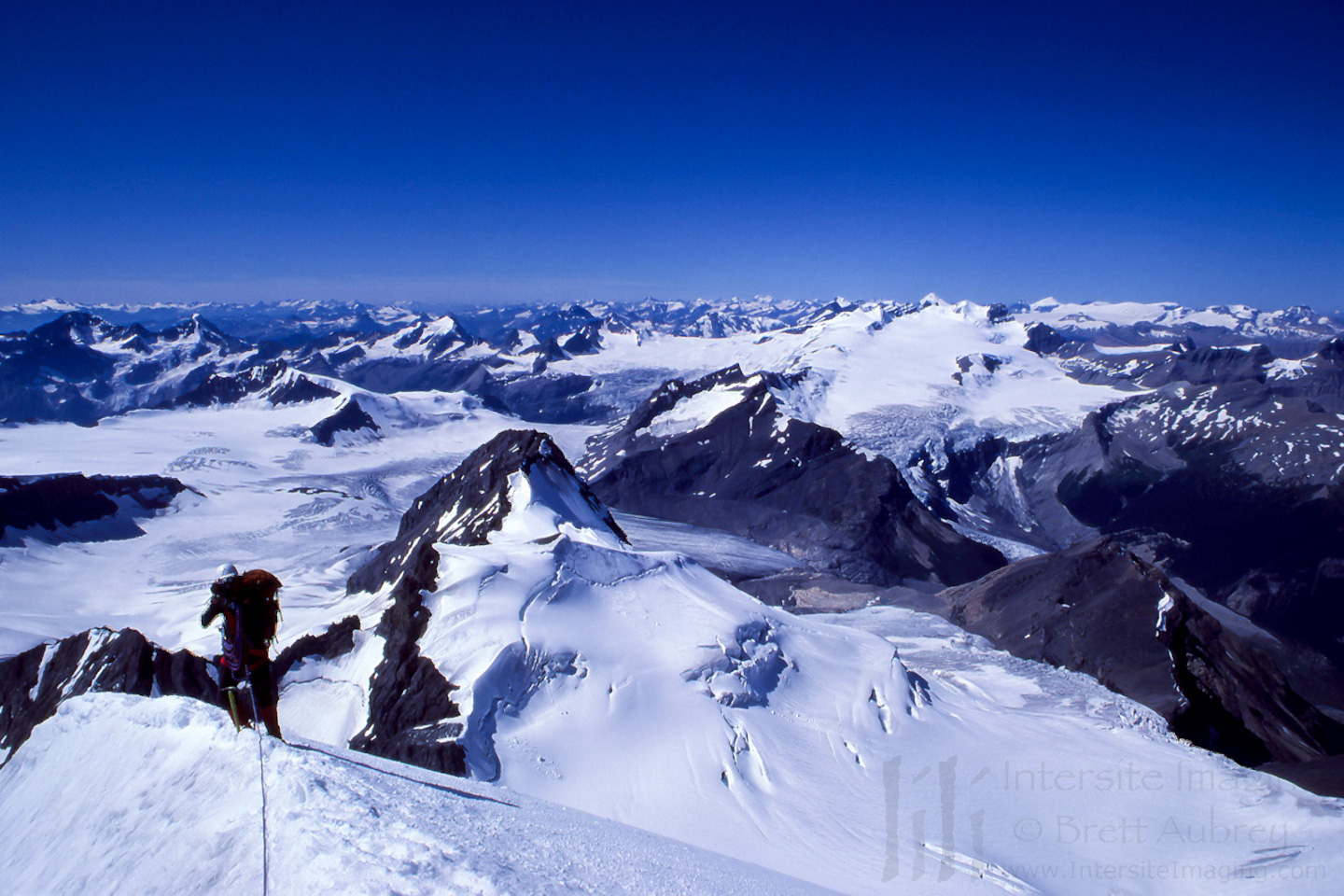
Mount Forbes summit looking northwest

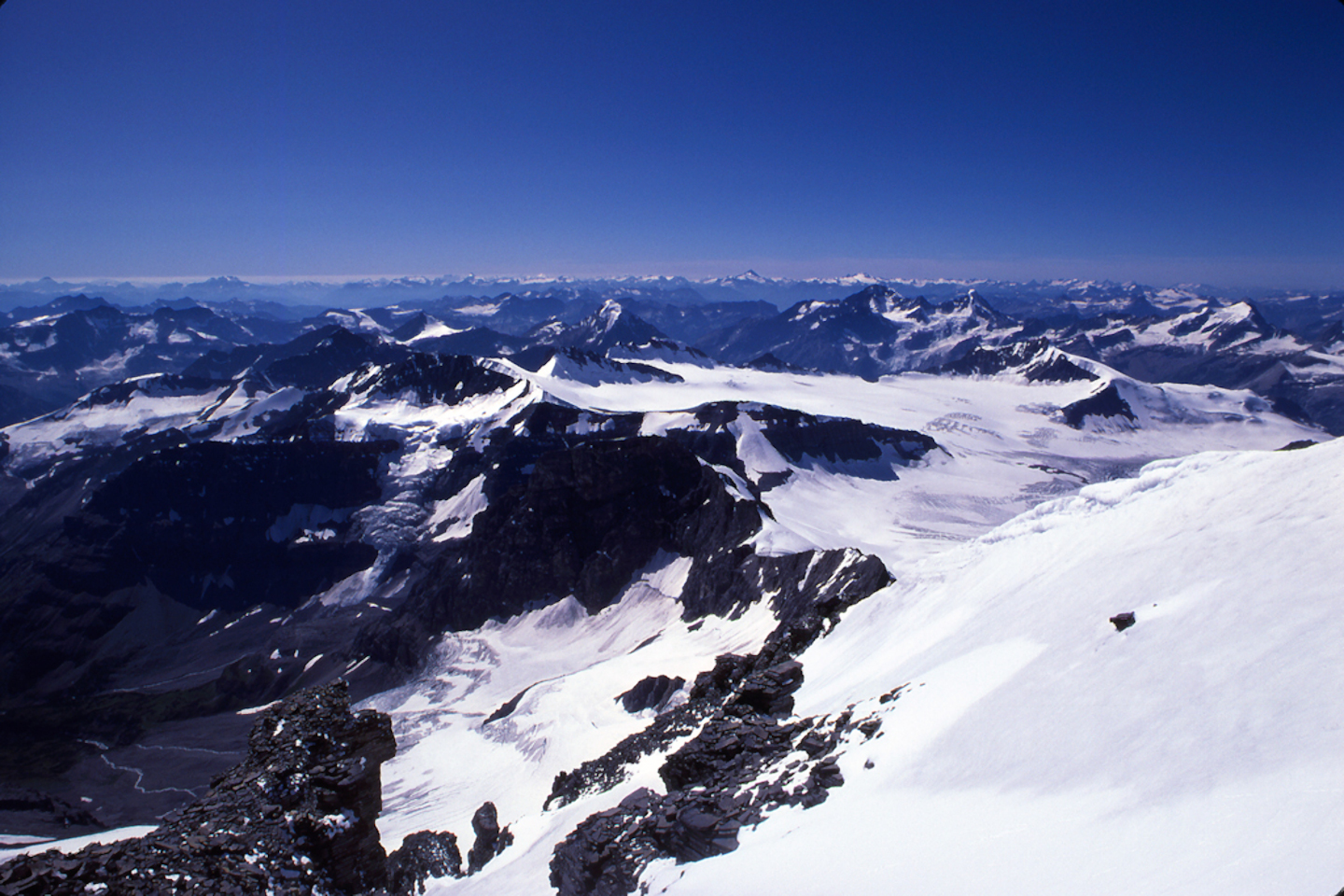
Mount Forbes summit looking west

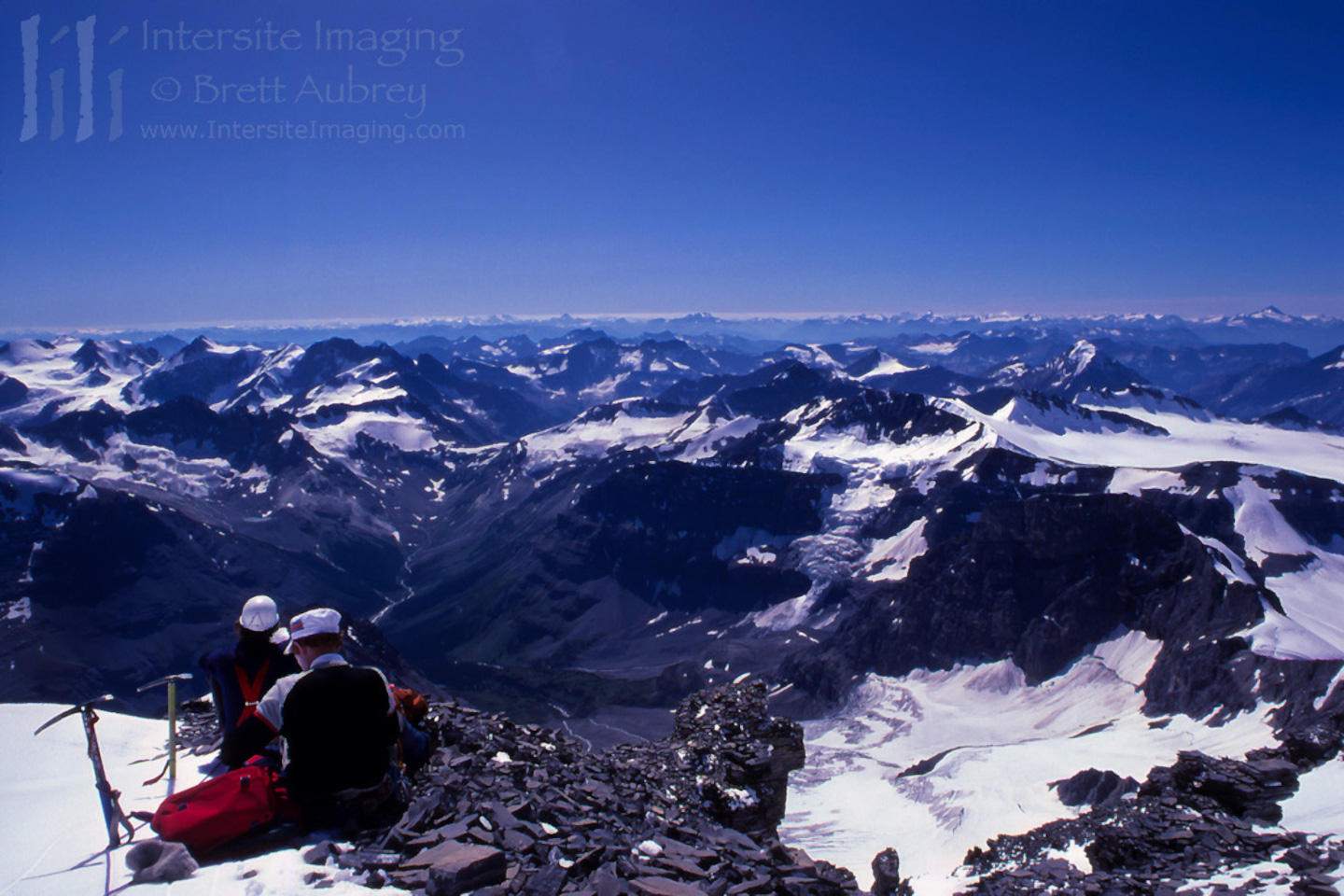
Mount Forbes' summit looking southwest

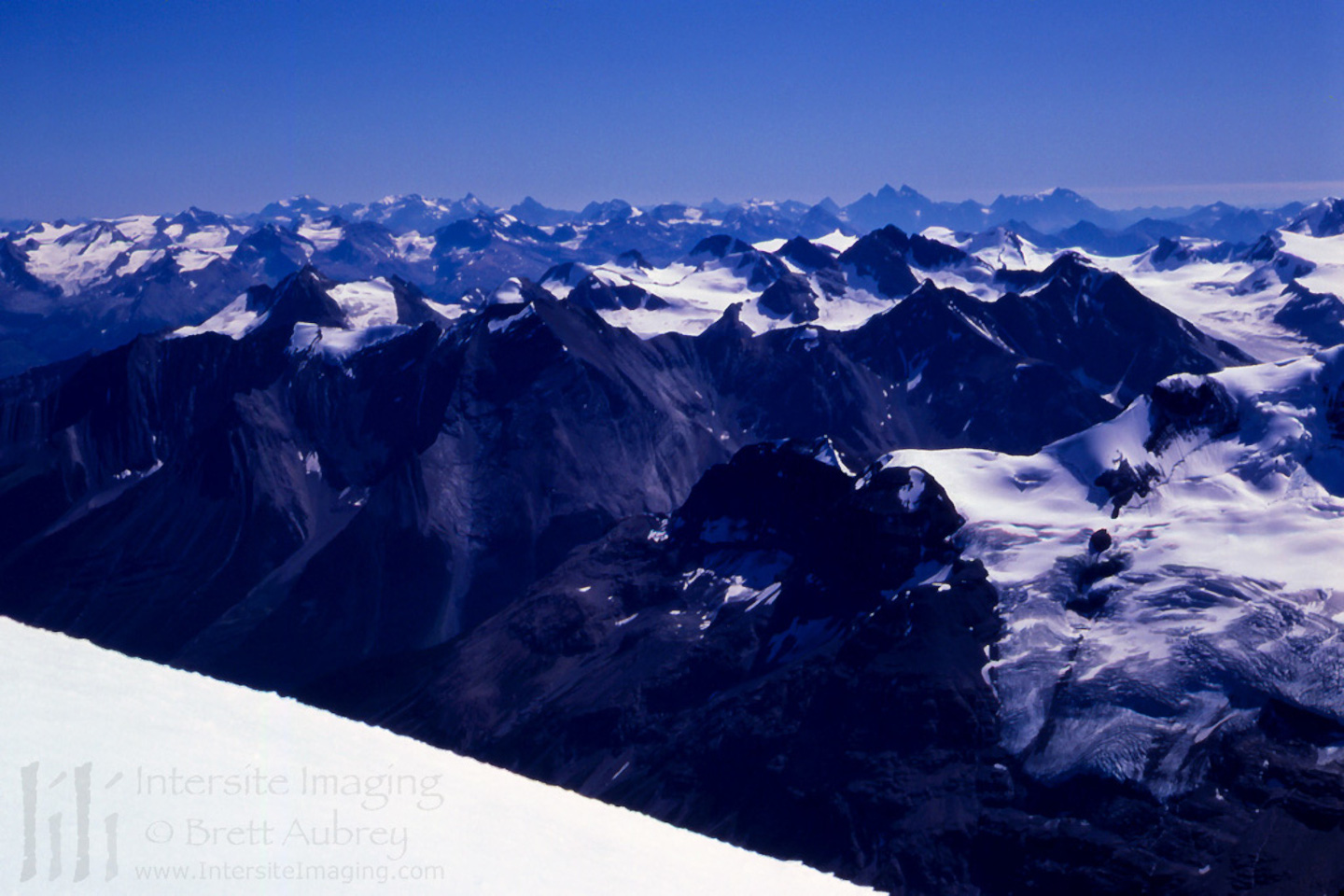
Mount Forbes' summit looking southeast

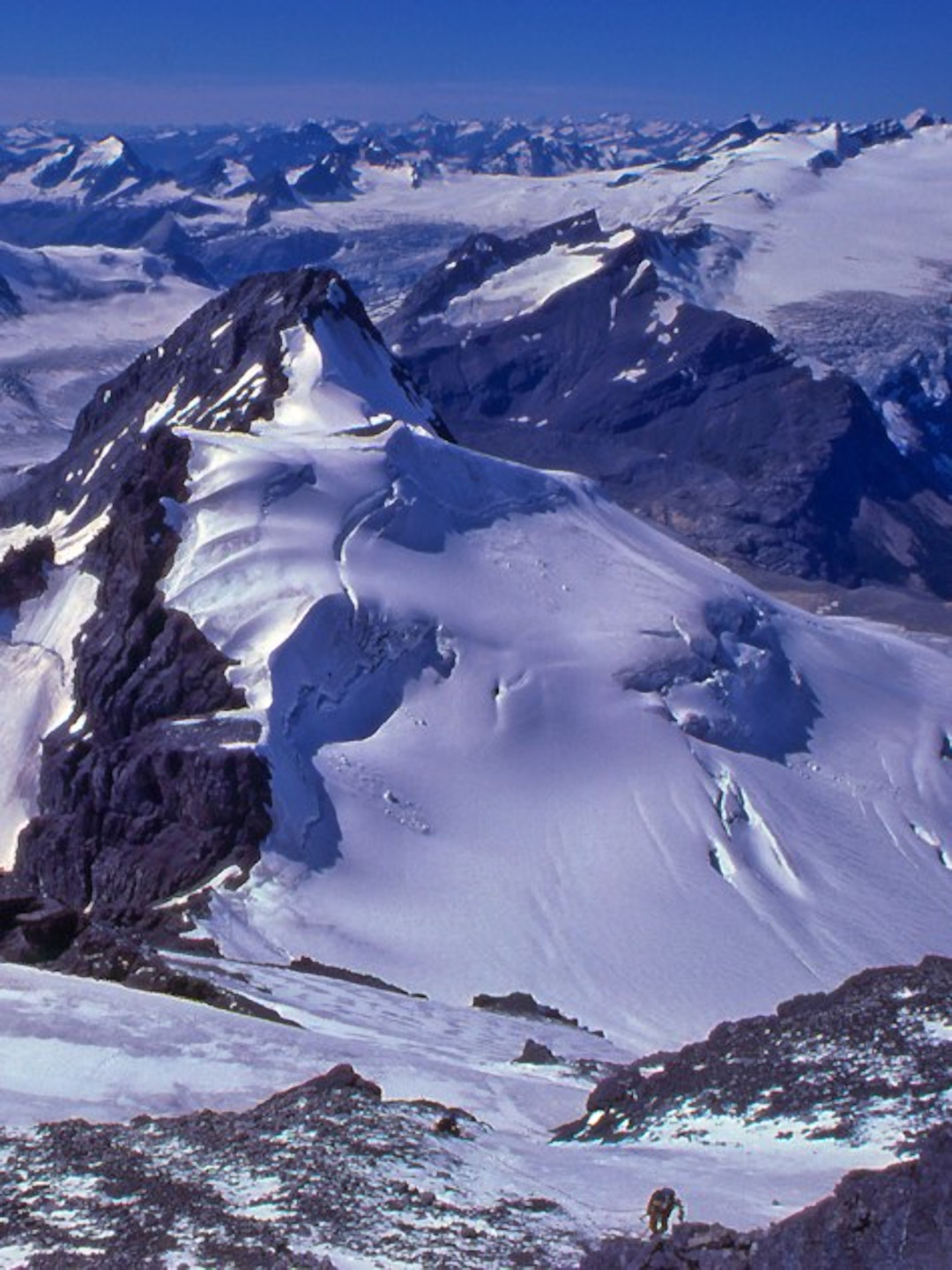
Mount Forbes Buttress & 2 US Climbers

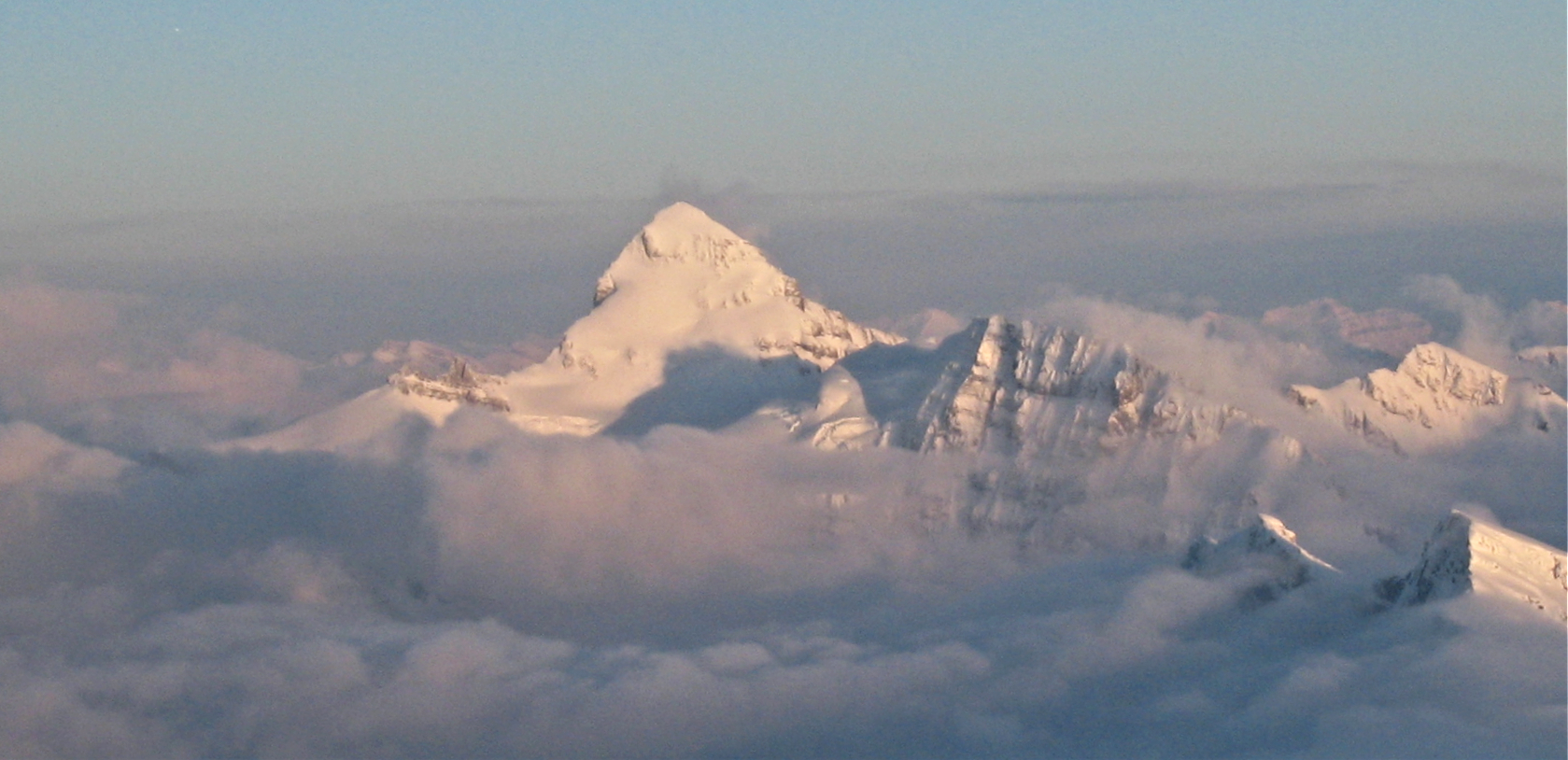
Mount Forbes (aerial shot over Alberta)

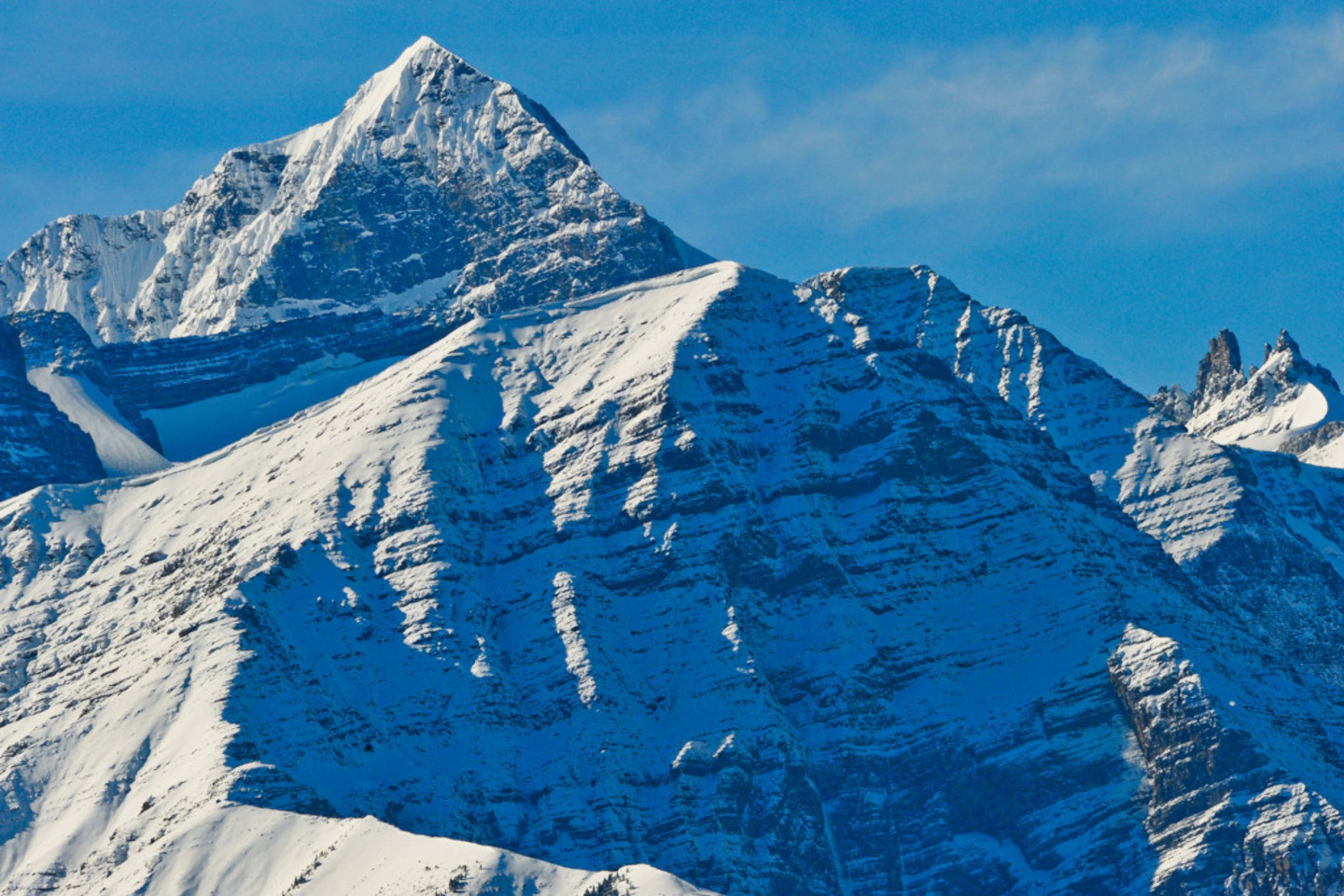
Mount Forbes from the Icefields Parkway

== See also ==
- Mountain peaks of Canada
- Mountain peaks of North America
- Mountain peaks of the Rocky Mountains
- Mistaya Mountain for a view of Mt. Forbes from the south-east
