= Manx Peak =

Mountain in Alberta, Canada

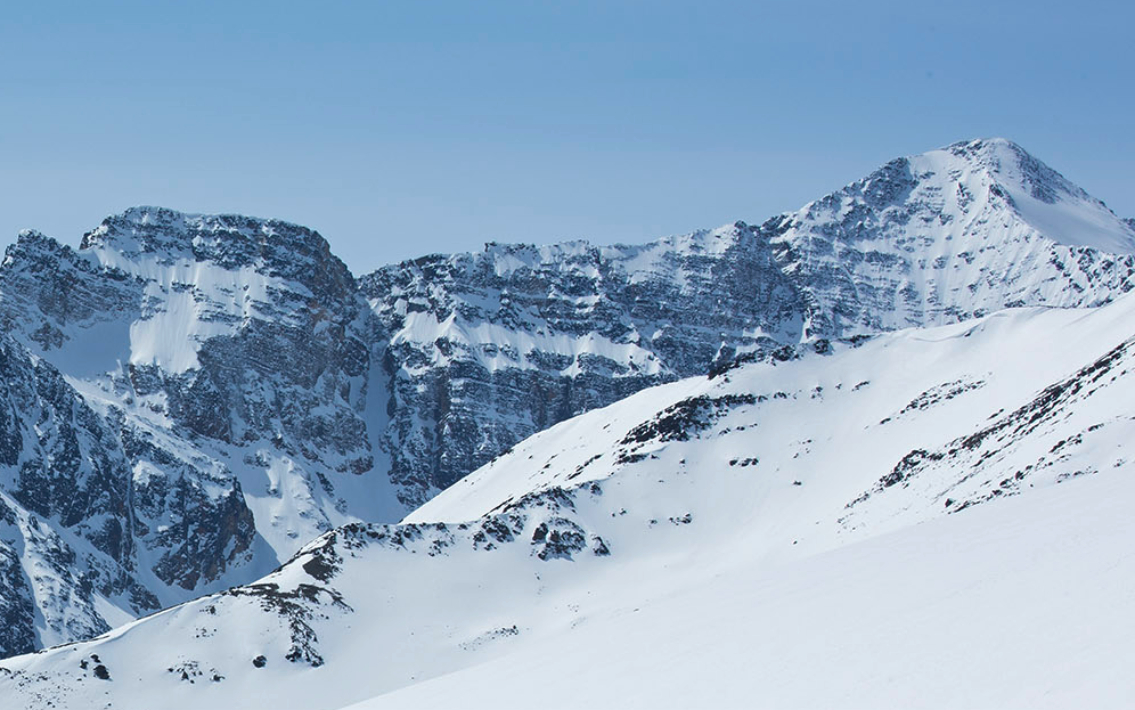
- Manx Peak seen from The Whistlers.

Highest point
- Elevation: 3,044 m (9,987 ft)
- Prominence: 374 m (1,227 ft)
- Parent peak: Mount Estella (3069 m)
- Listing: Mountains of Alberta
- Coordinates: 52°46′39″N 118°11′30″W

Geography
- Location within Alberta Location within Canada
- Interactive map of Manx Peak
- Country: Canada
- Province: Alberta
- Protected area: Jasper National Park
- Parent range: Trident Range; Canadian Rockies
- Topo map: NTS 83D16 Jasper

Climbing
- First ascent: 1919 R.T. Chamberlin, B. Herzberg

Manx Peak is a 3,044-metre (9,987 ft) mountain summit located in Jasper National Park, in the Trident Range of the Canadian Rockies of Alberta, Canada. The town of Jasper is situated 14 kilometres (8.7 mi) to the north-northeast. Circus Valley lies at the south side of the mountain, and the northeast aspect towers above the head of the valley of Whistlers Creek. Its nearest higher peak is Mount Estella, 1.8 km (1.1 mi) to the southwest, and Terminal Mountain lies 2.0 km (1.2 mi) to the east. The peak is composed of sedimentary rock laid down from the Precambrian to the Jurassic periods and pushed east and over the top of younger rock during the Laramide orogeny.

== History ==
The peak was named in 1916 by Morrison P. Bridgland because the shape of the contours of the mountain resemble the triskelion in the flag of the Isle of Man, the home of the Manx people. Bridgland (1878–1948), was a Dominion Land Surveyor who named many peaks in Jasper Park and the Canadian Rockies.

The first ascent of Manx Peak was made in 1919 by R.T. Chamberlin and B. Herzberg.

This mountain's toponym was officially adopted in 1951 by the Geographical Names Board of Canada.

== Climate ==
Based on the Köppen climate classification, Manx Peak is located in a subarctic climate zone with cold, snowy winters, and mild summers. Winter temperatures can drop below −20 °C (−4 °F) with wind chill factors below −30 °C (−22 °F). Precipitation runoff from Manx Peak drains into tributaries of the Athabasca River.

== Gallery ==
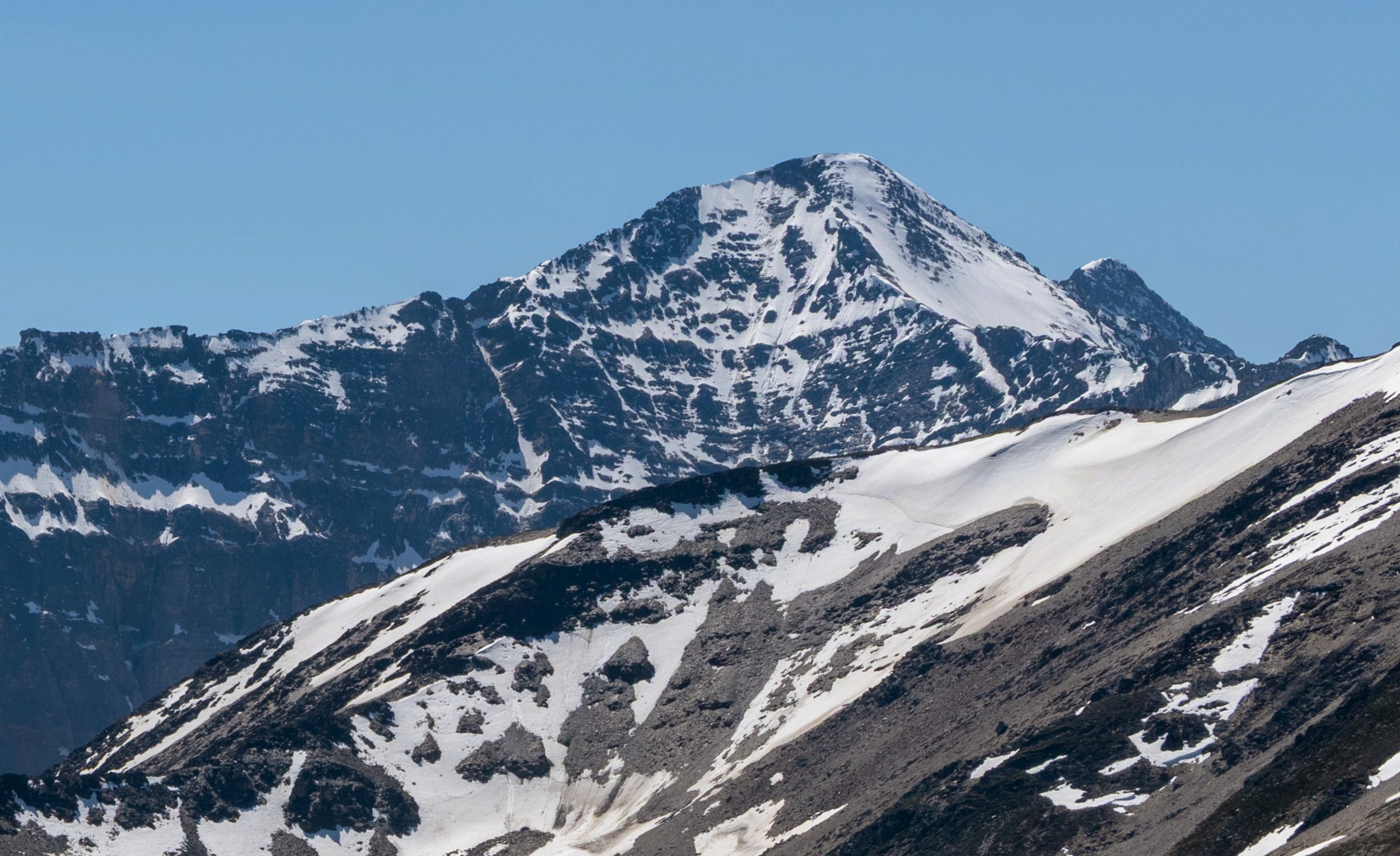
Manx Peak seen from The Whistlers

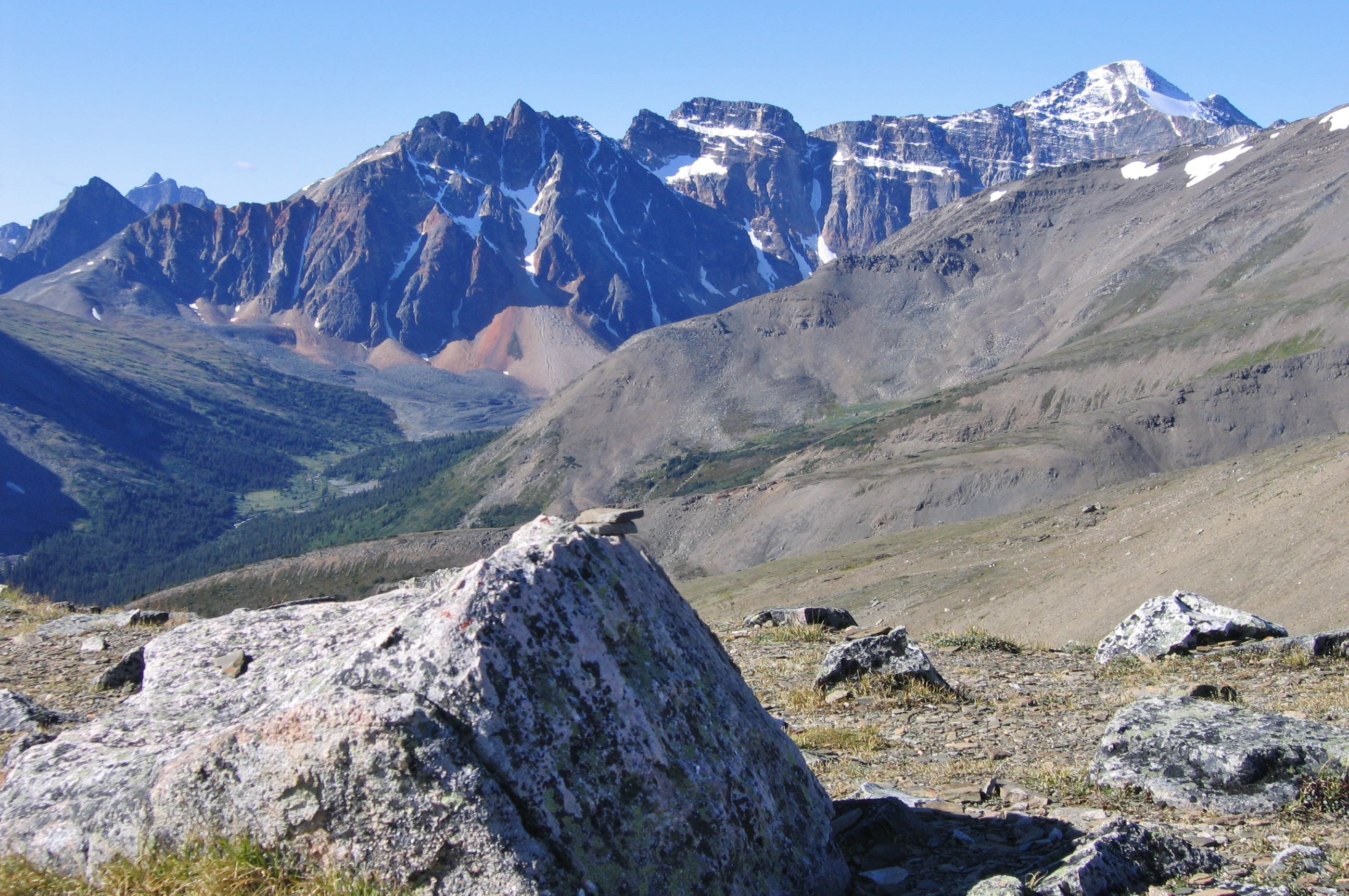
Terminal Mountain (left) and Manx Peak (upper right) seen from The Whistlers

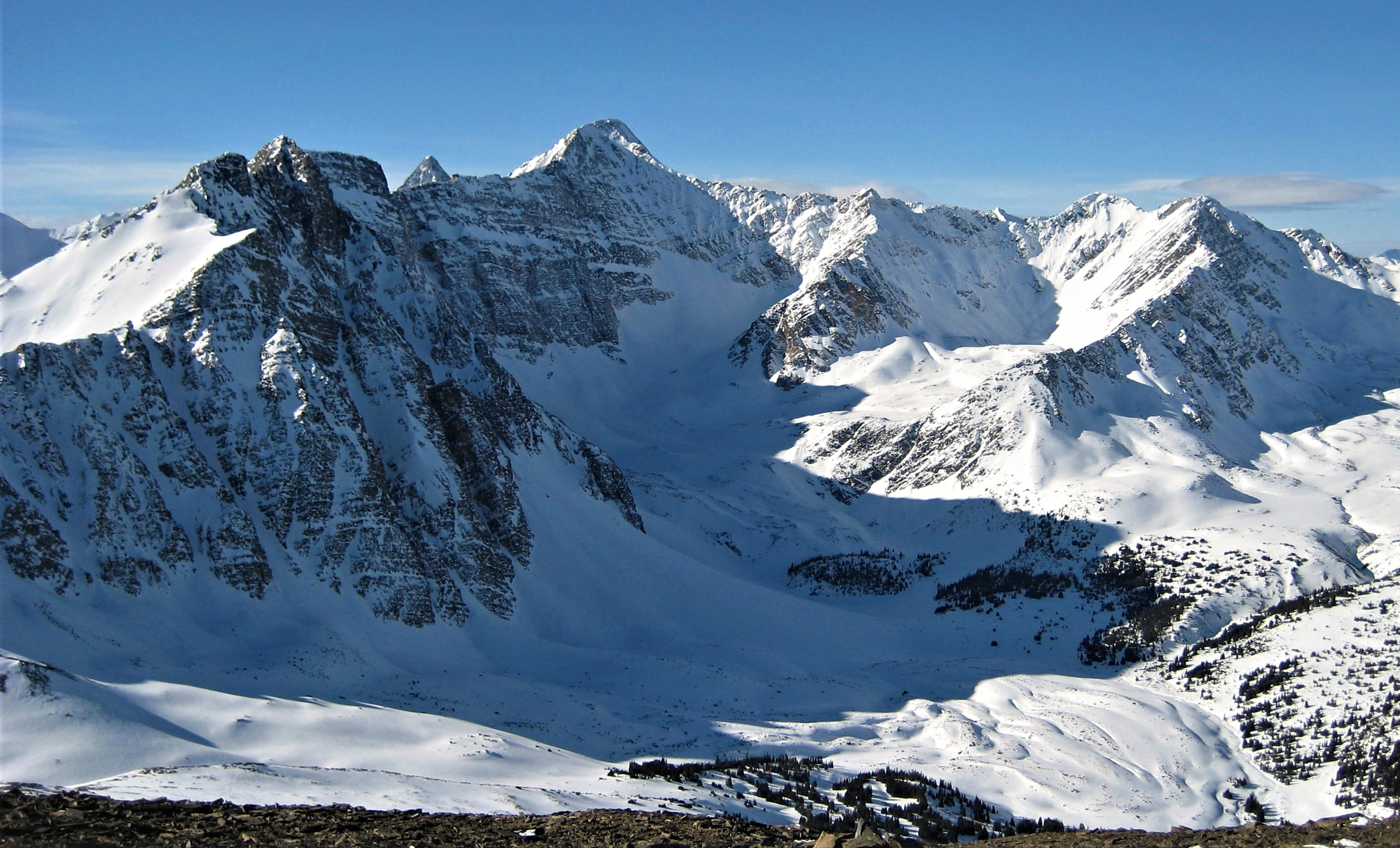
Terminal Mountain (left) and Manx Peak

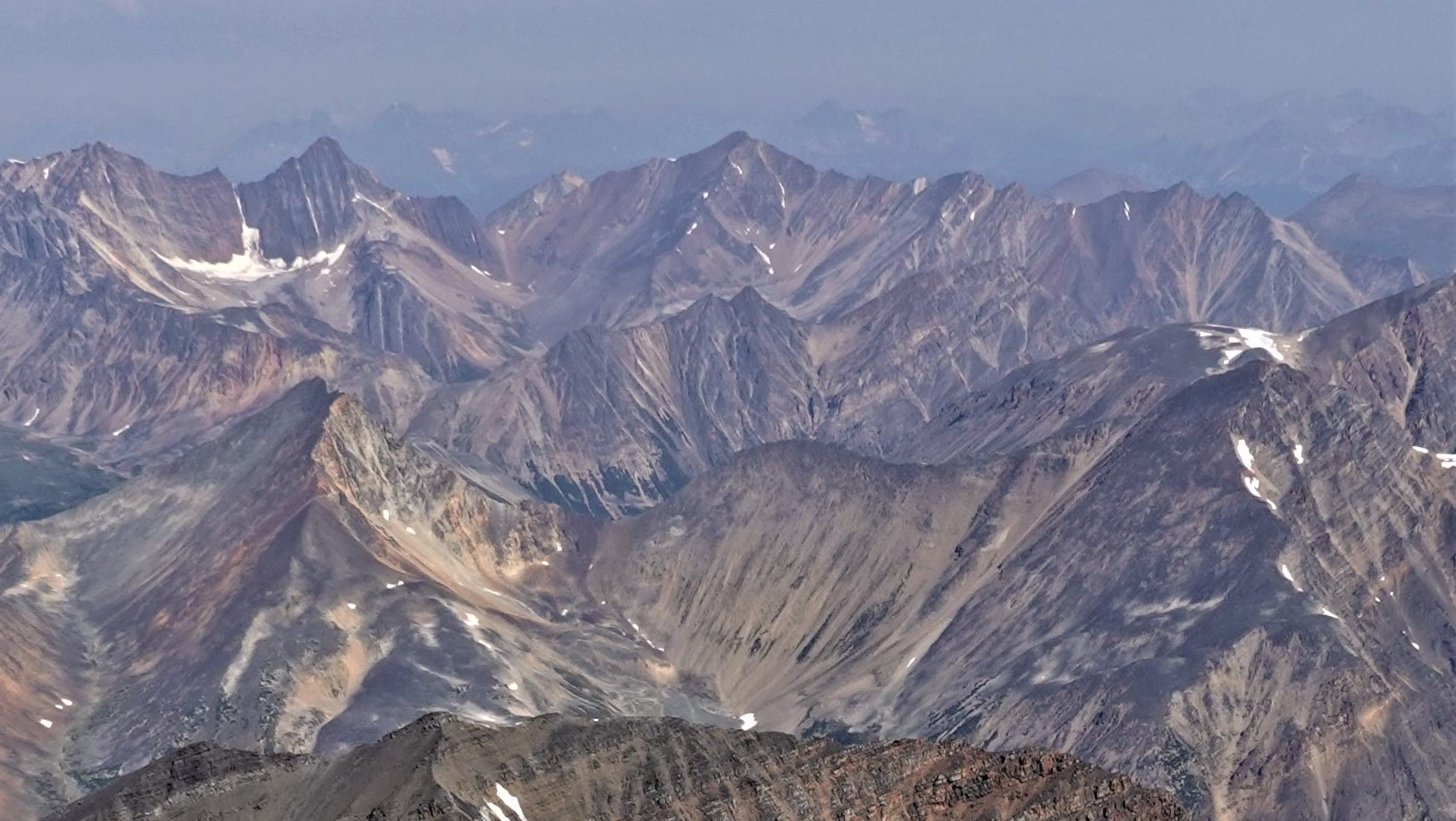
South aspect of Manx Peak centered at top, viewed from Mt. Edith Cavell

== See also ==
- List of mountains in the Canadian Rockies
- Geography of Alberta
