= Division Mountain =

Mountain in Alberta/British Columbia, Canada

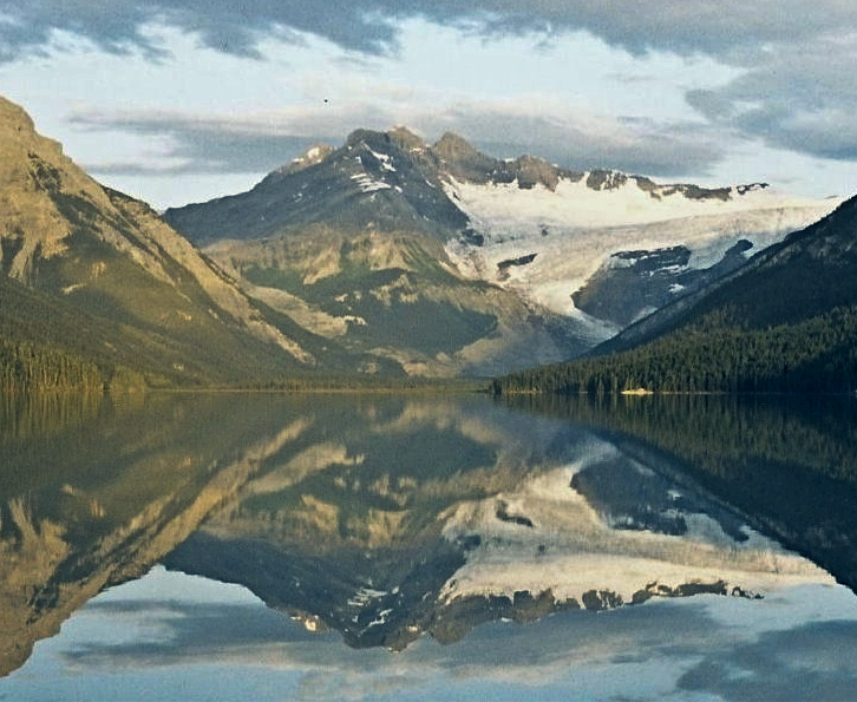
- Division Mountain reflected in Glacier Lake

Highest point
- Elevation: 3,020 m (9,910 ft)
- Prominence: 340 m (1,120 ft)
- Parent peak: Christian Peak (3406 m)
- Listing: Mountains of Alberta; Mountains of British Columbia
- Coordinates: 51°53′21″N 117°00′31″W

Geography
- Location within Alberta Location within British Columbia Location within Canada
- Country: Canada
- Provinces: Alberta and British Columbia
- Parent range: Canadian Rockies
- Topo map: NTS 82N14 Rostrum Peak

Climbing
- First ascent: 1918 by Interprovincial Boundary Commission

Division Mountain is located on the Continental Divide along the Alberta - British Columbia border of Canada. It also straddles the shared boundary of Banff National Park with Kootenay National Park in the Canadian Rockies. It was named in 1919 by Charles D. Walcott since the mountain divides the Lyell Icefield from the Mons Icefield.

== Geology ==
The mountain is composed of sedimentary rock laid down during the Precambrian to Jurassic periods. Formed in shallow seas, this sedimentary rock was pushed east and over the top of younger rock during the Laramide orogeny.

== Climate ==
Based on the Köppen climate classification, the mountain experiences a subarctic climate with cold, snowy winters, and mild summers. Temperatures can drop below -20 °C with wind chill factors below -30 °C in the winter.

== See also ==
- List of peaks on the Alberta–British Columbia border
