= Marmot Basin =

Ski area in Alberta, Canada

- Location within Alberta Location within Canada
- Location: Jasper National Park
- Nearest city: Edmonton, Alberta: 365 km (227 mi)
- Coordinates: 52°48′04″N 118°05′04″W
- Vertical: 914 m (2,999 ft)
- Top elevation: 2,612 m (8,570 ft)
- Base elevation: 1,698 m (5,571 ft)
- Skiable area: 6.8 km^{2} (2.6 sq mi)
- Trails: 91; 30% - Novice; 30% - Intermediate; 20% - Advanced; 20% - Expert
- Longest run: 5.6 km (3.5 mi)
- Lift system: 6 chairlifts 1 magic carpet
- Terrain parks: 3
- Snowfall: 440 cm (170 in)
- Snowmaking: Lower Area
- Website: Ski Marmot

Marmot Basin is an alpine ski area located on Marmot Mountain in Alberta's Jasper National Park. It has 91 named runs on four mountain faces with 3,000 vertical feet of drop. The area has a lift capacity of close to 12,000 skiers per hour on seven lifts. The season runs from mid-November to early May. It is located twenty minutes south of Jasper and has two million visitors annually.

== Amenities ==
Marmot Basin rents skis, snowboards, boots, and poles. The Snow Sports School offers lessons and children's programs.

There are three mountain day lodges: Caribou Chalet at the base of the ski hill and the Eagle and Paradise Chalets that are mid-mountain. There is no overnight on-mountain lodging at Marmot Basin.

Marmot Basin has three terrain parks – lower, mid, and upper mountain – with rail slides, table tops, and jumps.

=== Lift system ===
Lift Name	Vertical Rise	Type	Make	Build Year
Canadian Rockies Express	596m (1955')	High speed quad	Leitner-Poma	2009
Eagle Express	320m (1050')	High speed quad	Doppelmayr	1990
Paradise Express	410m (1345')	High speed quad	Leitner-Poma	2011
School House	122m (400')	Triple	Doppelmayr	2011 (moved from 1982 location)
Knob	270m (900')	Fixed grip quad	Doppelmayr	2023
Eagle Ridge	307m (1007')	Fixed grip quad	Doppelmayr	2001
Magic Carpet	8m (26')	Conveyor lift		2003

==== Former lifts ====
- Tranquilizer Chair (Double Chair) - 1968 - Removed 2009
- Kiefer T-Bar (T-Bar) - 1974 - Removed 2009
- School House T-Bar (T-Bar) - 1964 - Removed 2011
- Caribou Chair (Double Chair) - 1971 - Retired 2011
- Spillway T-Bar (T-Bar) - 1986 - Removed 1990
- Knob Chair (Double Chair) 1976 - Retired 2023

== Photos ==
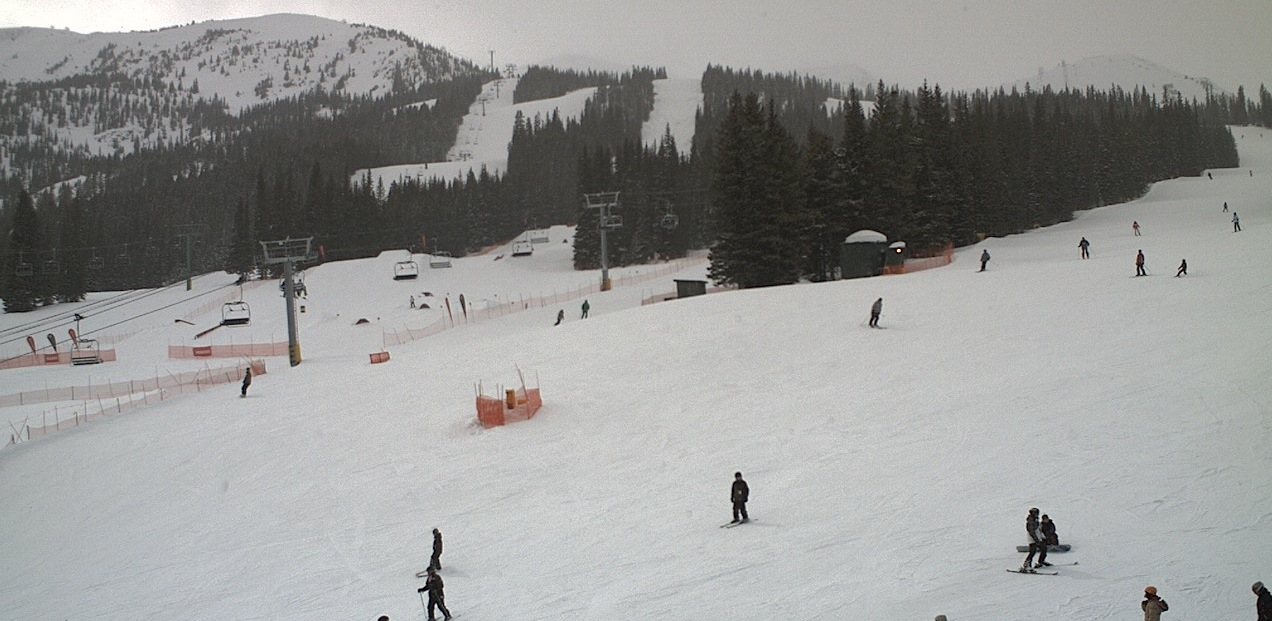
Lower Mountain

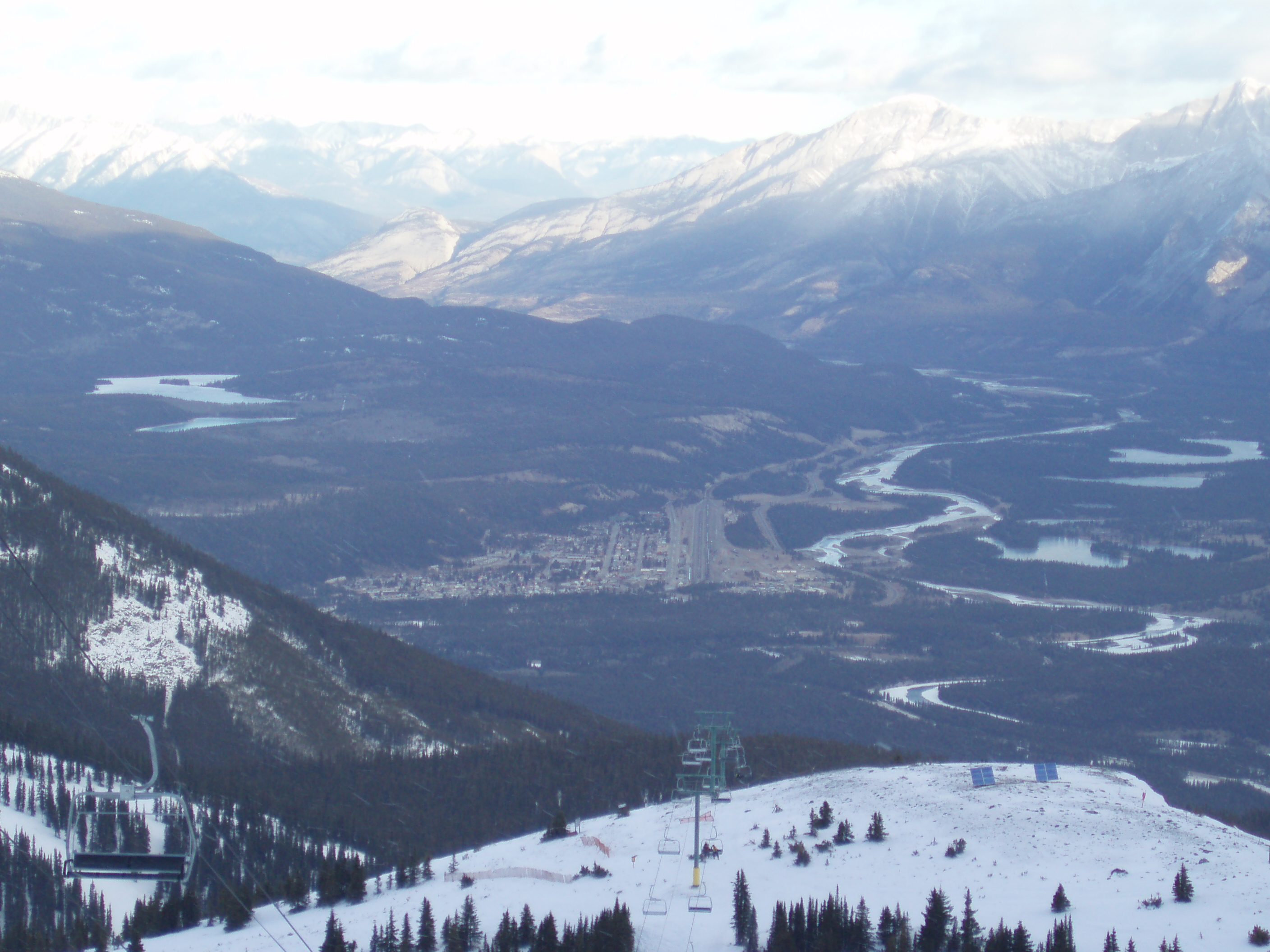
Town of Jasper from the Eagle Ridge lift

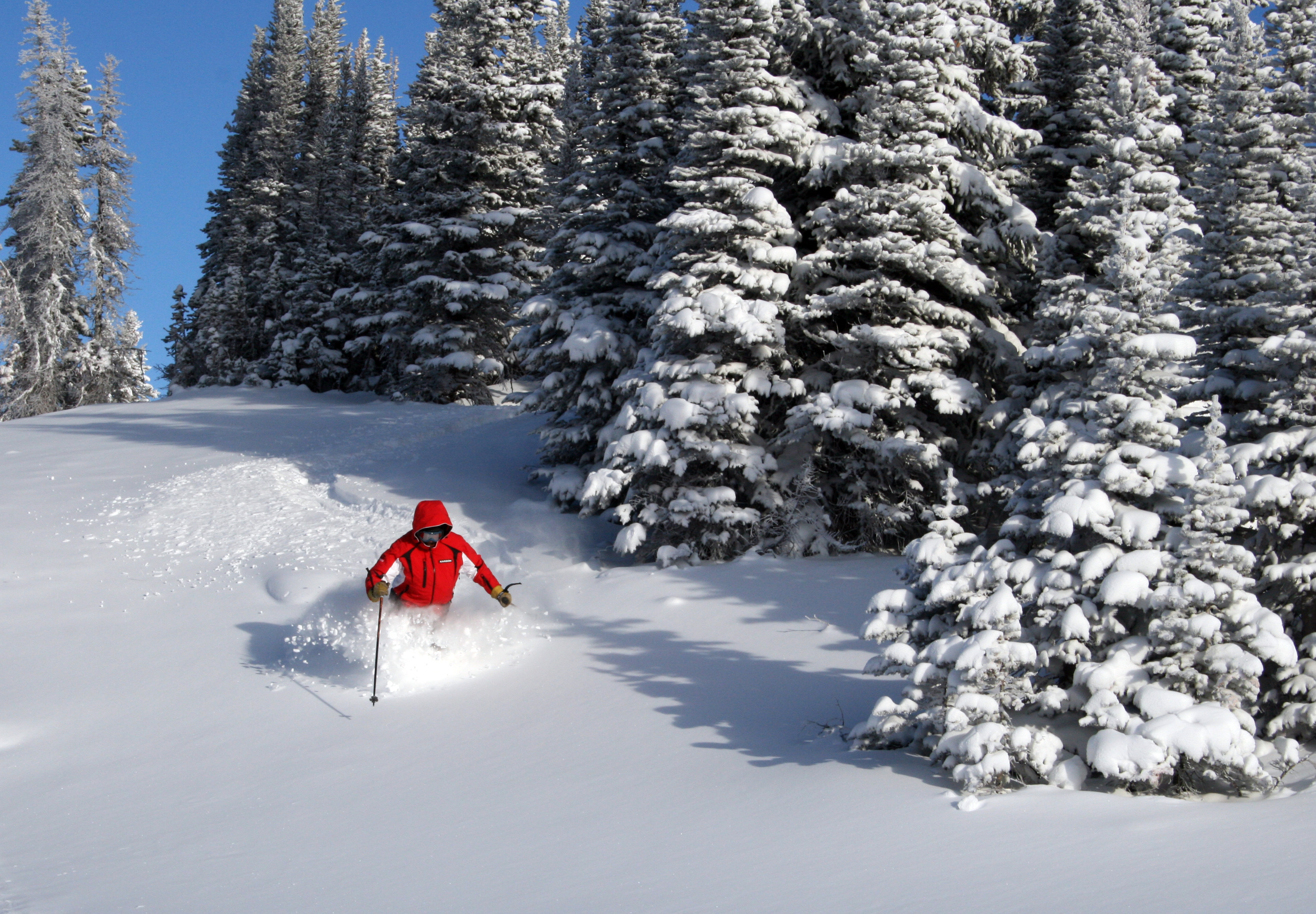
Powder day at Marmot Basin

== See also ==
- List of ski areas and resorts in Canada
- Jasper National Park
