= Arctomys Peak =

Mountain in Alberta, Canada

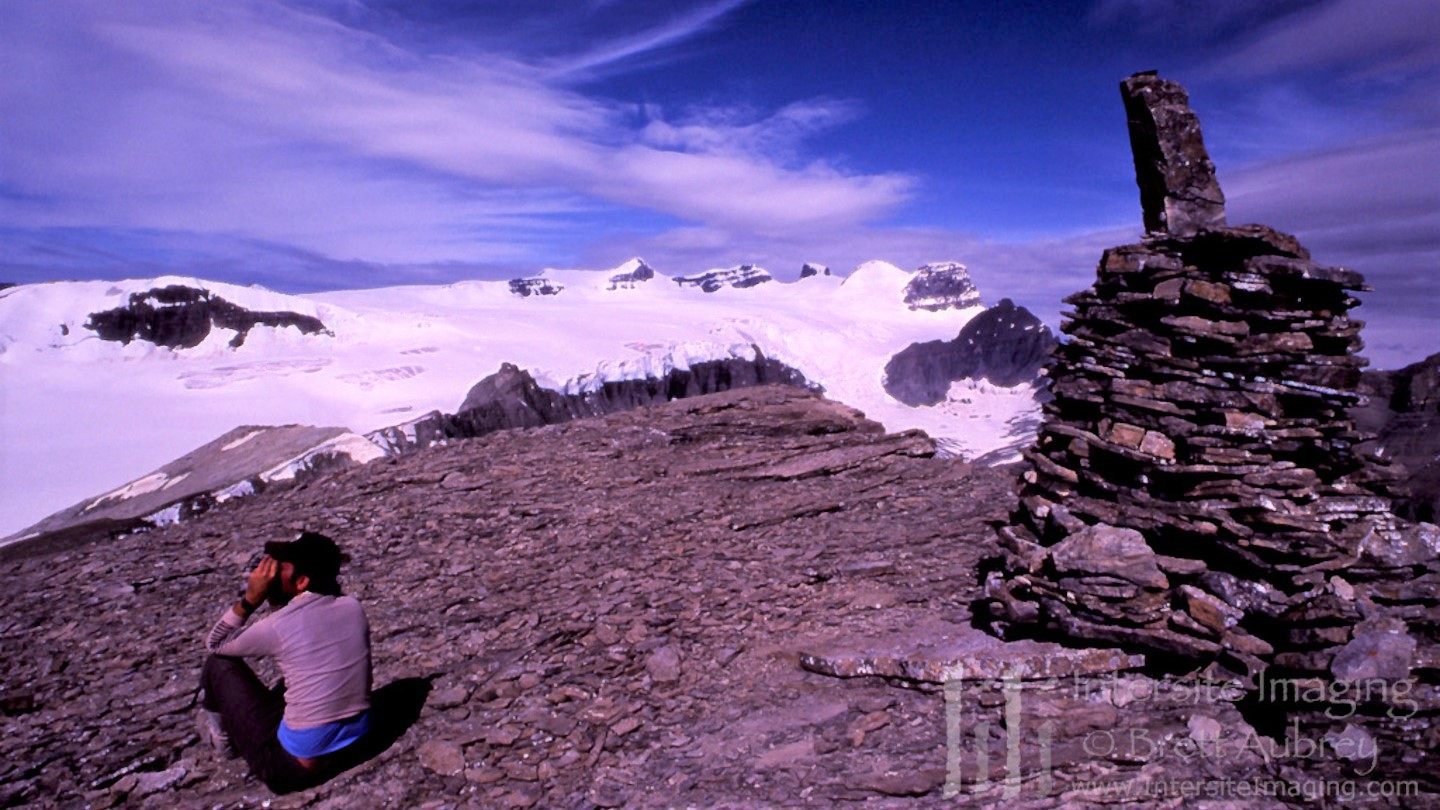
- Arctomys Peak summit cairn, the Lyells in back

Highest point
- Elevation: 2,793 m (9,163 ft)
- Prominence: 184 m (604 ft)
- Listing: Mountains of Alberta
- Coordinates: 51°56′20″N 117°00′18″W

Geography
- Location within Alberta Location within Canada
- Country: Canada
- Provinces: Alberta
- Topo map: NTS 82N10 Blaeberry River

Climbing
- First ascent: 1918 by the Interprovincial Boundary Commission
- Easiest route: Via Glacier Lake trail (as for the Lyells).

Arctomys Peak is a summit in Alberta, Canada.

Arctomys Peak was given the scientific name by Arthur O. Wheeler of a type of marmot native to the region.
