= Mount Erasmus =

Mountain in Banff NP, Alberta, Canada

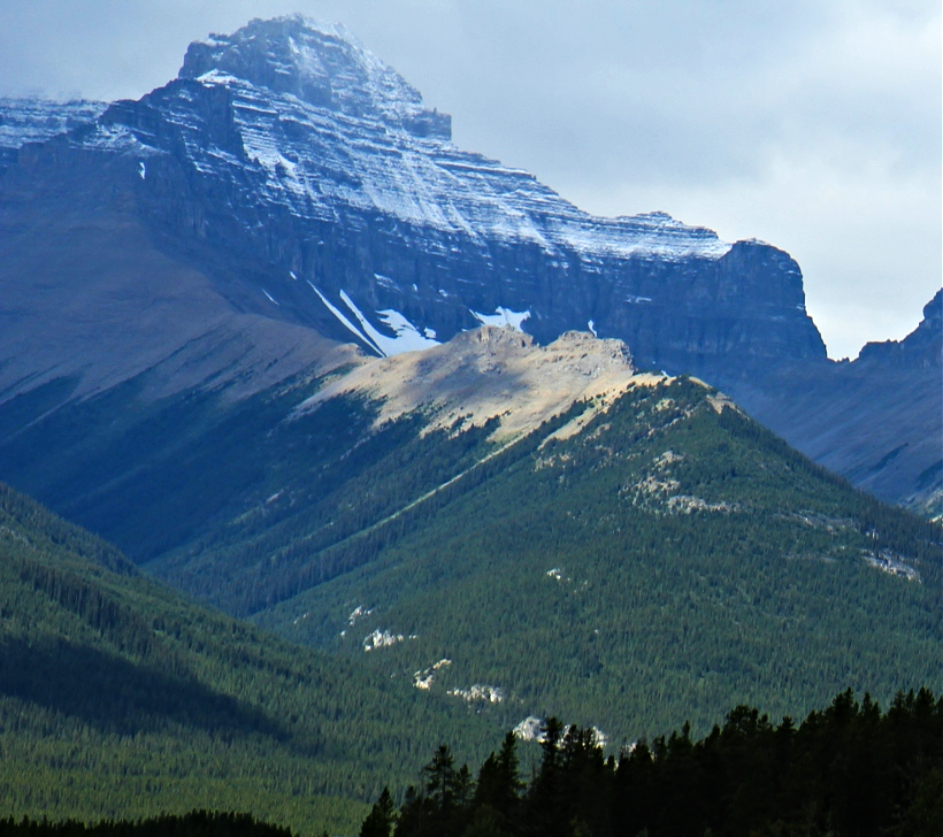
- Mount Erasmus seen from the Icefields Parkway

Highest point
- Elevation: 3,265 m (10,712 ft)
- Prominence: 735 m (2,411 ft)
- Parent peak: Mount Lyell (3498 m)
- Listing: Mountains of Alberta
- Coordinates: 51°57′35″N 116°55′16″W

Geography
- Location within Alberta Location within Canada
- Location: Alberta, Canada
- Parent range: Lyell Group, Central Icefields; Canadian Rockies
- Topo map: NTS 82N15 Mistaya Lake

Geology
- Rock type: Sedimentary

Climbing
- First ascent: 1950 J. C. Oberlin, F. D. Ayres
- Easiest route: Mountaineering

Mount Erasmus is a 3,265-metre (10,712-foot) mountain summit located in the North Saskatchewan River valley of Banff National Park, in the Canadian Rockies of Alberta, Canada. Its nearest higher peak is Mount Amery, 9.41 km (5.85 mi) to the north-northwest. Mount Erasmus can be seen from the Icefields Parkway west of Saskatchewan Crossing, with optimum photography conditions in morning light.

== History ==
Mount Erasmus was named by James Hector in 1859 during the Palliser expedition for Peter Erasmus (1833-1931), who was an interpreter and guide for that exploration into the Canadian Rockies. Peter's skills as a Métis interpreter opened up the west for scientists, explorers, and government officials.

The first ascent of the mountain was made in 1950 by John C. Oberlin and Fred Ayres.

The mountain's name was officially adopted in 1957 by the Geographical Names Board of Canada.

== Geology ==
Like other mountains in Banff Park, Mount Erasmus is composed of sedimentary rock laid down from the Precambrian to Jurassic periods. Formed in shallow seas, this sedimentary rock was pushed east and over the top of younger rock during the Laramide orogeny.

== Climate ==
Based on the Köppen climate classification, Mount Erasmus is located in a subarctic climate zone with cold, snowy winters, and mild summers. Winter temperatures can drop below -20 °C with wind chill factors below -30 °C. In terms of favorable weather conditions, summer months are best for climbing. Precipitation runoff from Mount Erasmus drains into tributaries of the North Saskatchewan River.

== Gallery ==
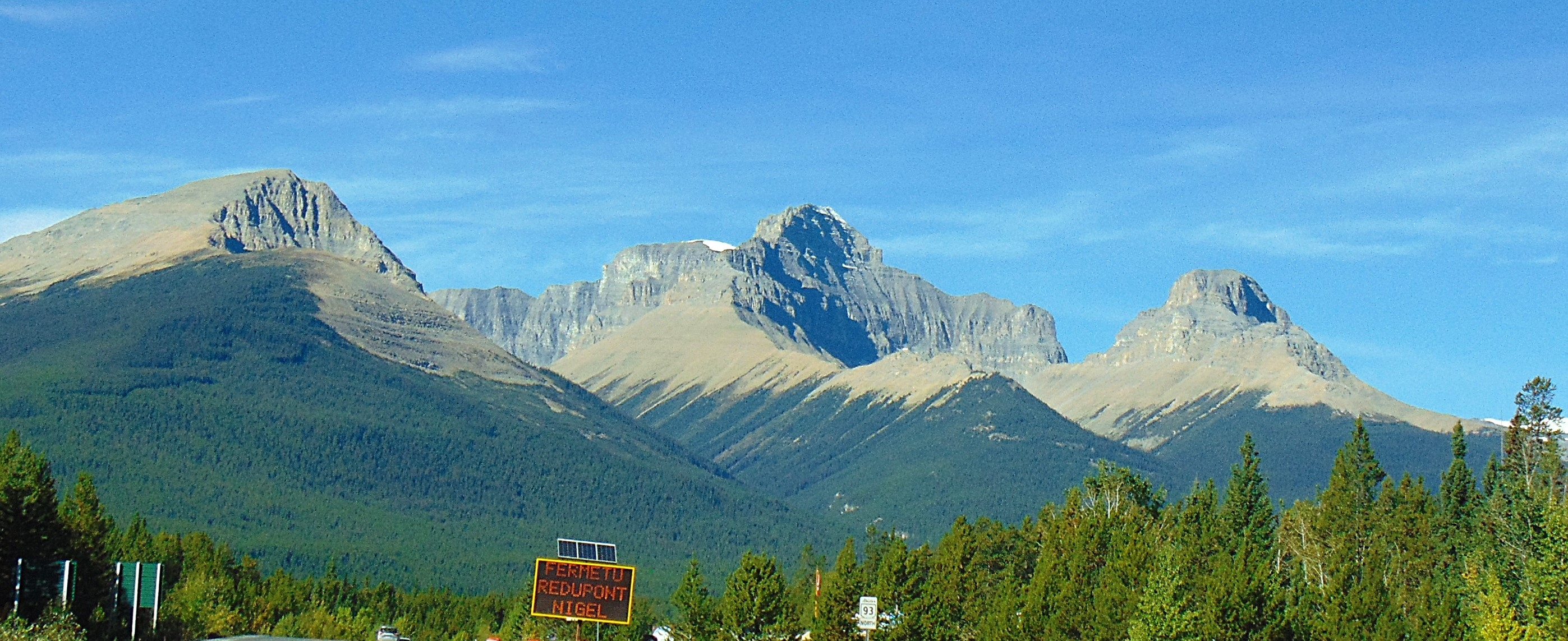
East aspect

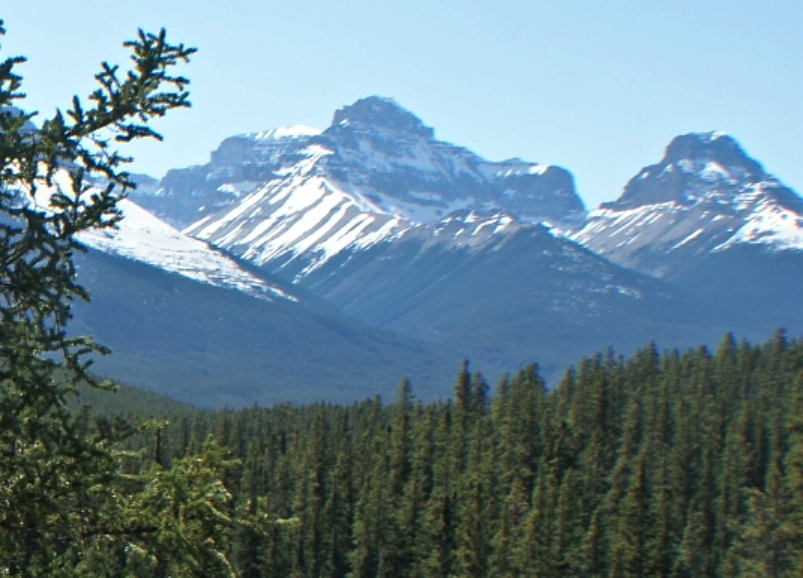
Mount Erasmus

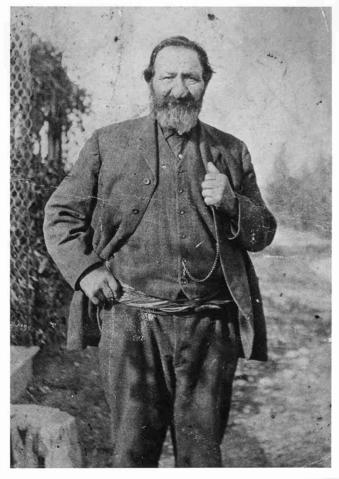
Peter Erasmus

== See also ==
- List of mountains of Canada
- Geography of Alberta
