= Aran =

Aran may refer to:

== Places ==
=== Azerbaijan ===
Villages and municipalities:

- Aran, Aghjabadi
- Aran, Lerik
- Aran, Shaki
- Aran, Tovuz
- Aran, Yevlakh

=== Iran ===
- Aran, Alborz, a village in Alborz Province
- Aran, Nain, a village in Isfahan Province
- Aran, Kermanshah, a village in Kermanshah Province
- Aran, former name of the city of Rezvanshahr, Isfahan
- Aran, former name of Bileh Savar in Ardabil Province

=== Russia ===
- Aran, village in Dagestan

=== Elsewhere ===
- Aran Fawddwy, mountain in Wales, United Kingdom
  - Aran Benllyn, subsidiary summit
- Aran (river), in France
- Aran Islands, a group of islands across the mouth of Galway Bay, Ireland
- Arranmore, also known as Aran Island, off the coast of County Donegal, Ireland
- Val d'Aran, commonly shortened to Aran, an autonomous region of Catalonia, Spain
- Aran Island (disambiguation), several islands
- Isle of Arran, Scotland

== People ==
- Aran Bell, American ballet dancer
- Aran Embleton (born 1981), English female international footballer
- Aran Fox (born 1988), English ice hockey goaltender
- Aran Hakutora (born 1984), Russian sumo wrestler
- Aran Jones, chief executive of Cymuned, a Welsh pressure group
- Aran Tharp (born 1977), New York filmmaker
- Aran Zalewski (born 1991), Australian field hockey player
- François-Amilcar Aran (1817–1861), French physician

== Fictional characters ==
- Samus Aran, the protagonist of Nintendo's Metroid video game series
- Aran Linvail, in the role-playing game Baldur's Gate II: Shadows of Amn
- Aran Ryan, in the Nintendo-produced Punch-Out!! game series

== Other uses ==
- Aran or Haran, brother of Abraham in the Bible
- Aran jumper, a style of jumper originating in Ireland
- HSwMS Äran, a former vessel of the Swedish Navy
- Aran (film), a 2006 film in the Tamil language
- Aran, ISO 15294 code for the Nastaliq (Persian and Urdu) script
- Left Recomposition or ARAN, a political party in Greece

== See also ==
- Aaron (disambiguation)
- Arran (disambiguation)
- Arun (disambiguation)
- Earl of Arran (Ireland)
- Enda of Aran (5th-6th century), Irish saint
- Aer Arann, former regional airline in Ireland
