= Holy Island, Firth of Clyde =

Island in the Firth of Clyde, Scotland

Holy Island
An t-Eilean Àrd/Eilean MoLaise (Gaelic)
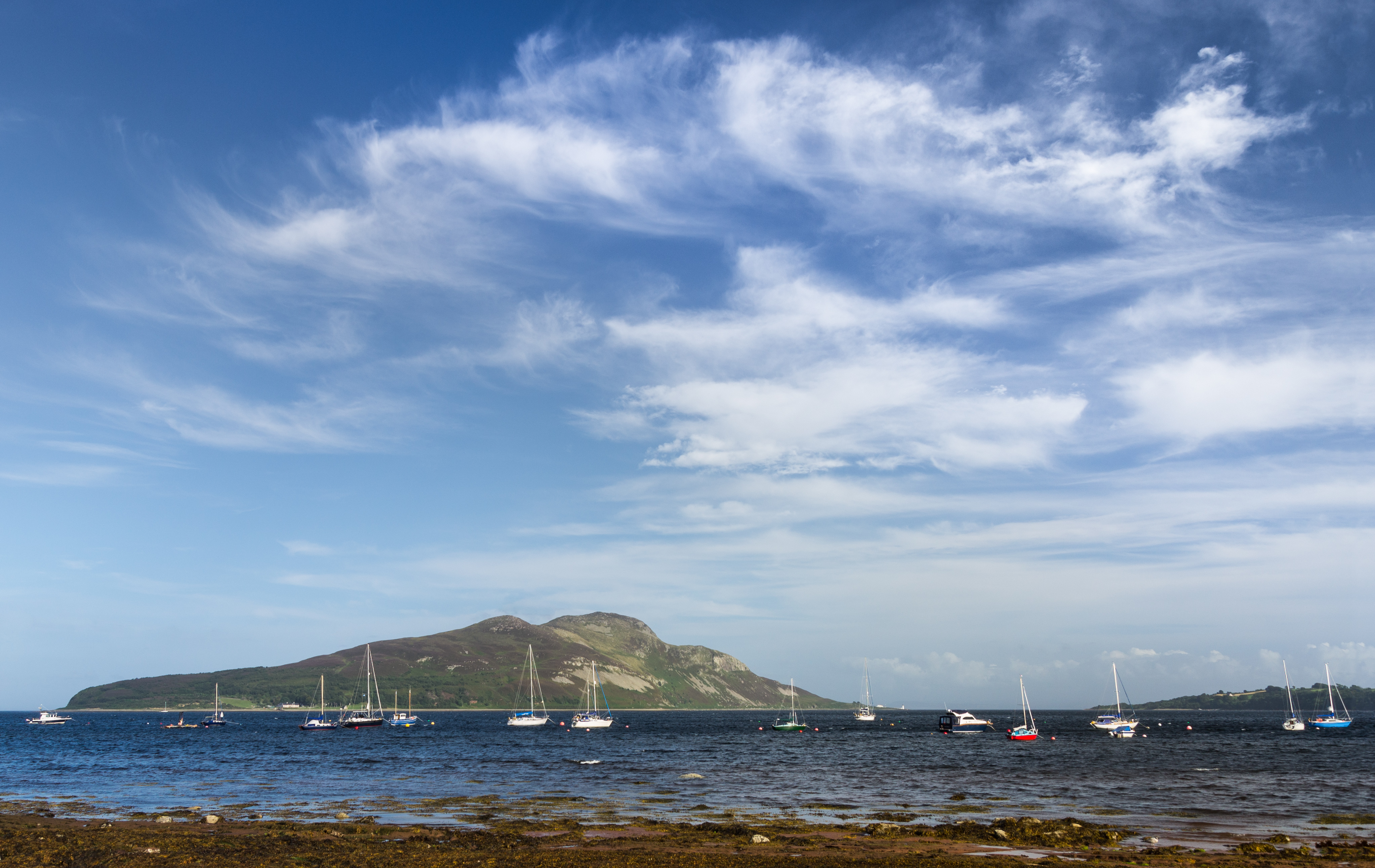
- Holy Island from Lamlash

Location
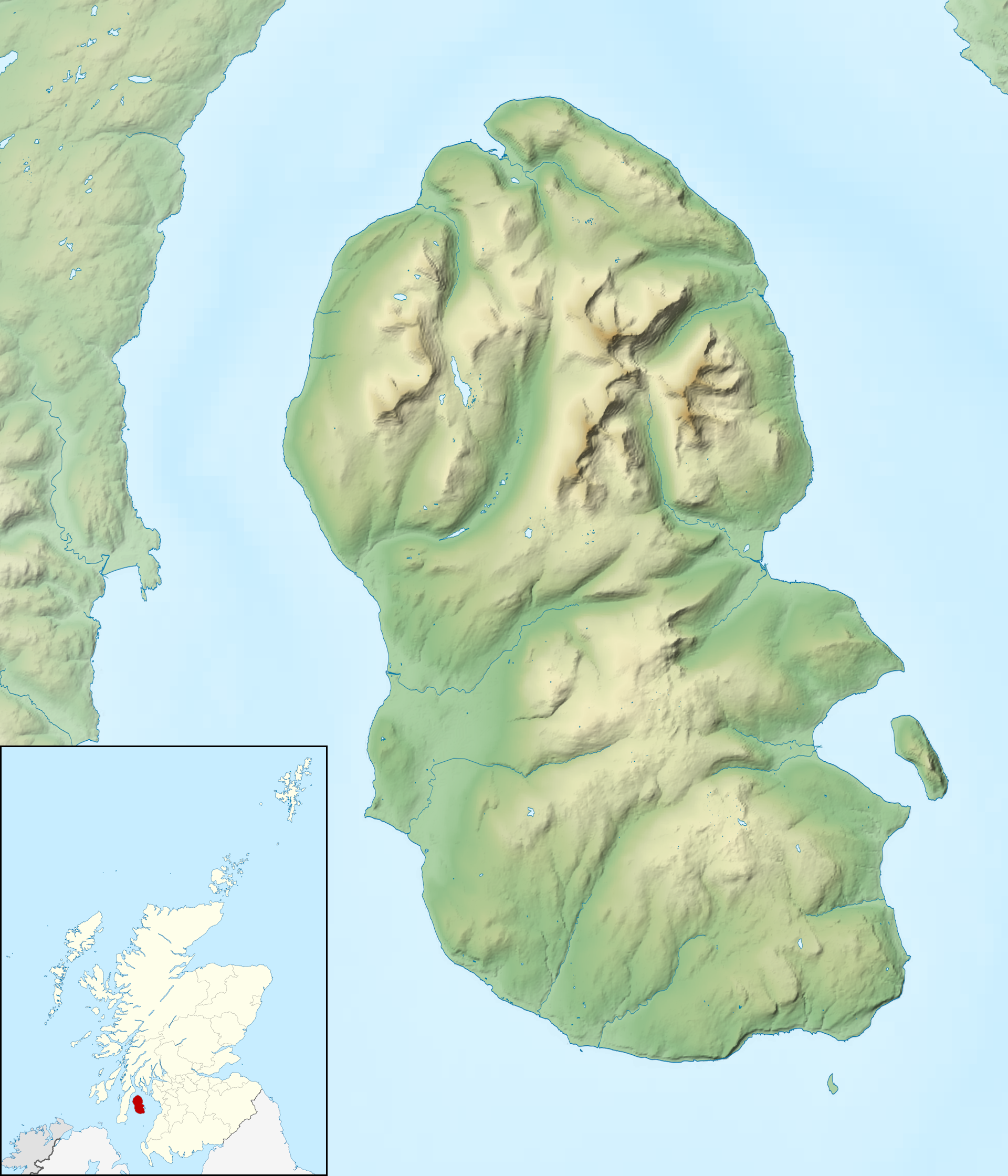
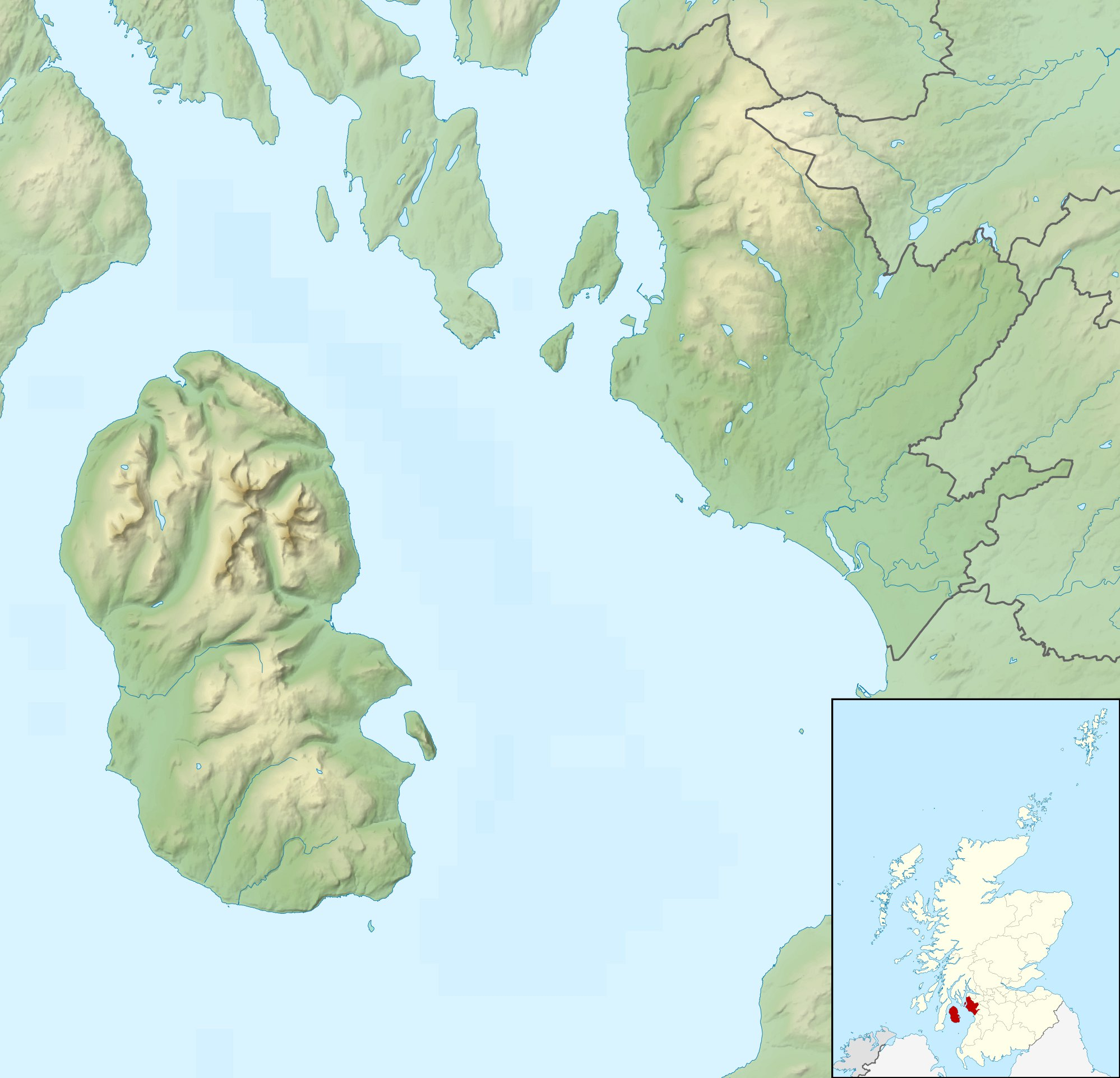
- Holy Island shown next to Arran Holy Island shown within North Ayrshire
- OS grid reference: NS063297
- Coordinates: 55.53°N 5.07°W

Name
- Name meaning: "the high island" or "Laisren's island" in Gaelic.

Physical geography
- Island group: Firth of Clyde
- Area: 263 ha (1 sq mi)
- Area rank: 95
- Highest elevation: Mullach Mòr, 1,030 ft (314 m) – a Marilyn

Administration
- Council area: North Ayrshire
- Country: Scotland
- Sovereign state: United Kingdom

Demographics
- Population: 17
- Population rank: 62=
- Population density: 6.7/km^{2} (17/sq mi)

Mullach Mòr
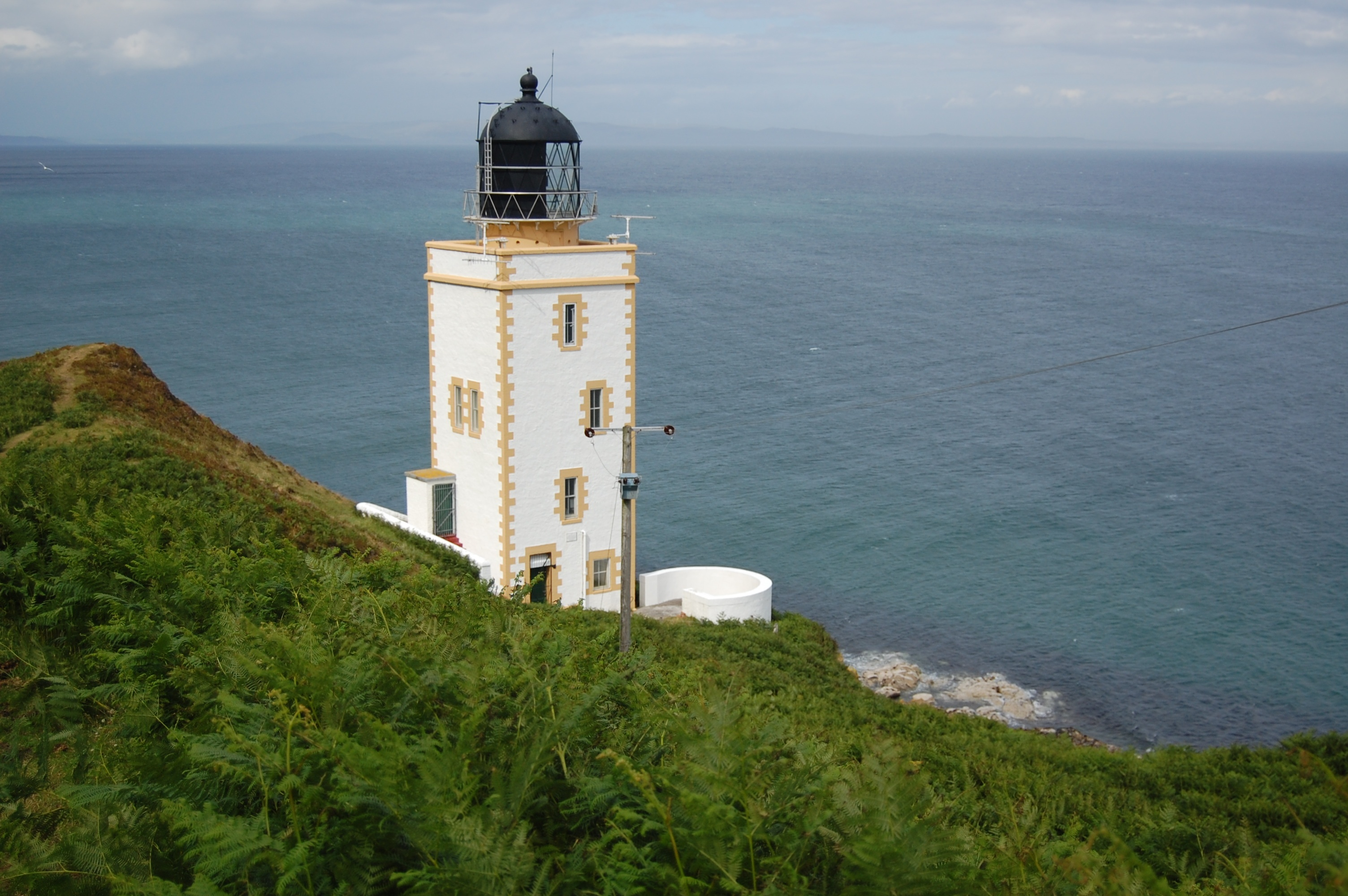
- Lighthouse on Holy Isle SE.

Highest point
- Elevation: 1,030 ft (310 m)
- Prominence: 1,030 ft (310 m)
- Listing: Marilyn
- Coordinates: 55°31′30″N 5°04′20″W

Naming
- English translation: Big hill
- Language of name: Gaelic
- Pronunciation: Scottish Gaelic: [ˈmul̪ˠəx ˈmoːɾ]

Geography
- Location: Firth of Clyde, Scotland
- OS grid: NS063297
- Topo map: OS Landranger 69

The Holy Island or Holy Isle (Scottish Gaelic: Eilean MoLaise) is an island in the Firth of Clyde, off the west coast of central Scotland, inside Lamlash Bay on the larger Isle of Arran. The island is around 3 kilometres (1 7/8 mi) long and around 1 kilometre (5/8 mi) wide. Its highest point is the hill Mullach Mòr.

== History ==
The island has a long history as a sacred site, with a spring or holy well held to have healing properties, the hermit cave of 6th century monk St Molaise, and evidence of a 13th-century monastery. An old Gaelic name for the island was Eilean MoLaise, Molaise's Island; this is the origin (via Elmolaise and Limolas) of "Lamlash", the name of the village on Arran that faces Holy Island.

Some runic writing is to be found on the roof of St Molaise's cave and a Viking fleet sheltered between Arran and Holy Isle before the Battle of Largs.

In 1549, Dean Monro wrote of the "little ile callit the yle of Molass, quherin there was foundit by Johne, Lord of the iles, ane monastry of friars, which is decayit."

== Current ownership ==
In 1992, the island was in the possession of Kay Morris, a devout Catholic who reportedly had a dream in which the Virgin Mary instructed her to give ownership of the island to the Samyé Ling Buddhist Community, who belong to the Kagyu school of Tibetan Buddhism. The settlements on the island include the Centre for World Peace and Health, founded by Lama Yeshe Losal Rinpoche, on the north of the island. This is an environmentally designed residential centre for courses and retreats which extends the former farm house. It has solar water heating and a reed-bed sewage treatment system. The approach from the ferry jetty is decorated with Tibetan flags and stupas. On the southern end of the island lives a community of nuns who are undertaking three-year retreats.

The remainder of the island is treated as a nature reserve with wild Eriskay ponies, Saanen goats, Soay sheep and the replanting of native trees. The rare Rock Whitebeam tree is found on the island, an essential link in the evolution of the Arran Whitebeam species, Sorbus arranensis, Sorbus pseudofennica and Sorbus pseudomeinichii. These are indigenous and unique to Arran.

There is a regular ferry service from Lamlash, and the island is popular with holiday makers staying on Arran. The usually resident population was recorded as 31 in 2011, an increase from 13 in 2001. At the time of the 2022 census the population was 17.

== Gallery ==
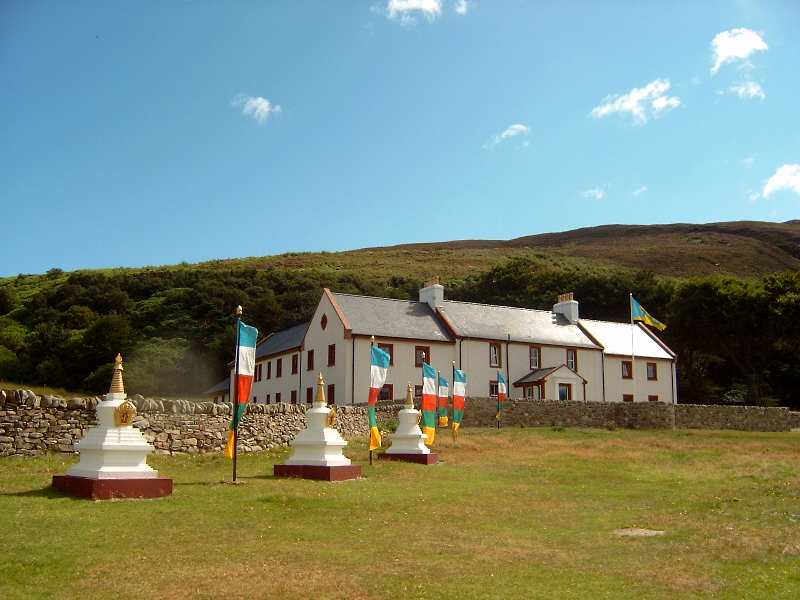
The Centre for World Peace and Health, with Tibetan flags and stupas

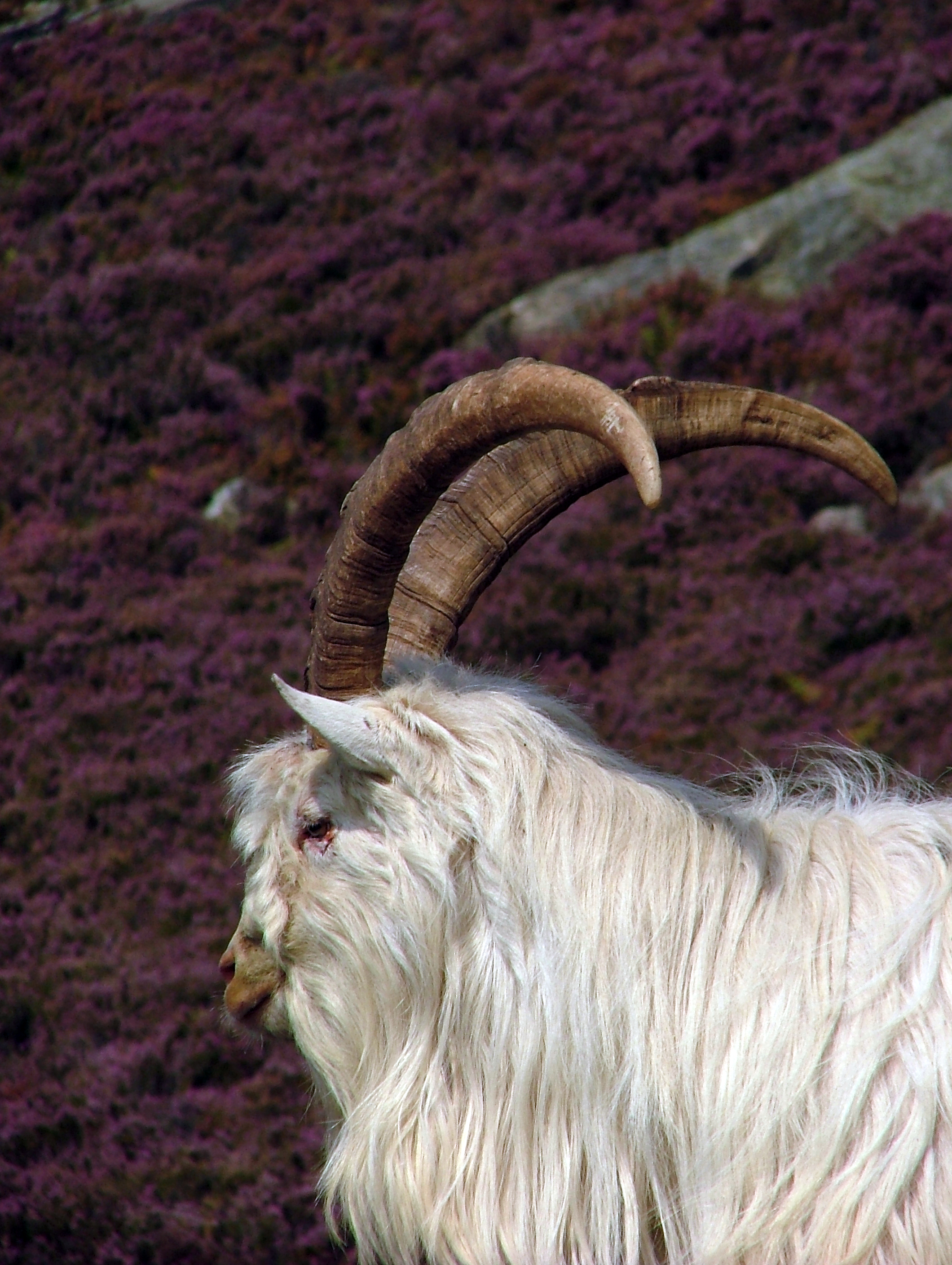
One of the Saanen goats

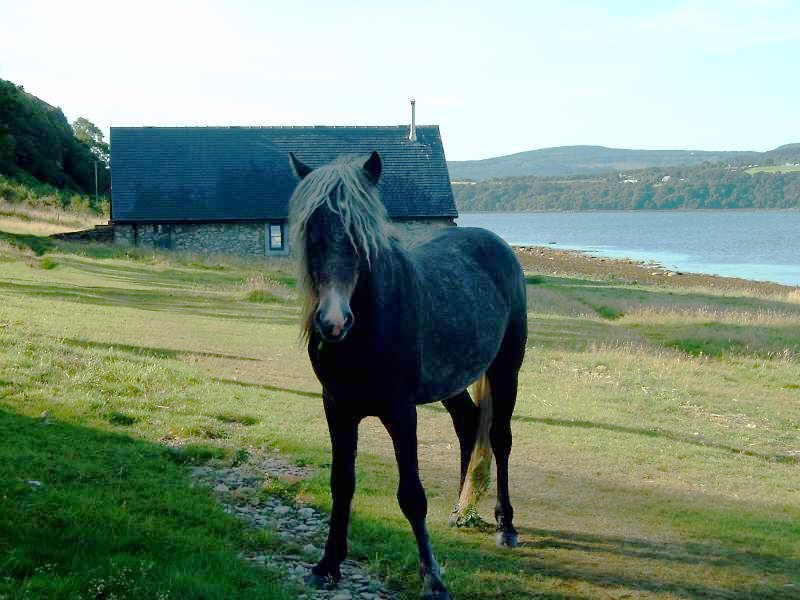
One of the wild Eriskay ponies

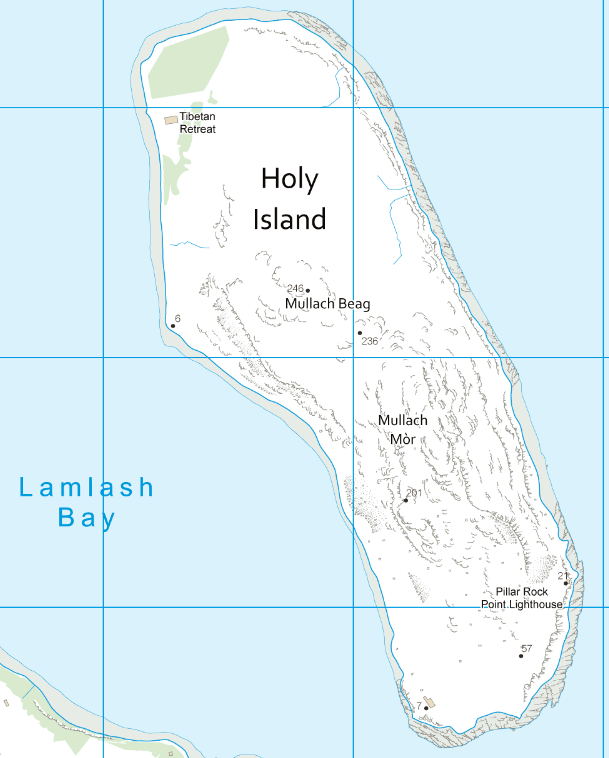
Map of the island
