= Anura (disambiguation) =

Anura is the order of frogs.

Anura may also refer to:

== Biology ==
- Anura (plant), a genus of flowering plants in the daisy family
- Anura (elephant), a long-lived elephant at the Tama Zoo in Japan

== People ==
- Anura Bandaranaike (1949–2008), Sri Lankan politician
- Anura Kumara Dissanayake (born 1968), 10th President of Sri Lanka
- Anura Horatious, Sri Lankan novelist
- Anura C. Perera (born 1947), Sri Lankan-American writer and astronomer
- Anura Ranasinghe (1956–1998), Sri Lankan cricketer
- Anura Rohana, (born 1973), Sri Lankan golfer
- Anura Tennekoon (born 1946), Sri Lankan cricketer
- Anura Wegodapola (born 1981), cricketer for Sri Lanka Navy
- Anura Priyadharshana Yapa (born 1959), Sri Lankan politician

== Places ==
- Anura, Varanasi, a village in Uttar Pradesh, India

== See also ==
- Aruna (disambiguation)
