= Aruna =

Aruna may refer to:

== Religion and mythology ==
- Aruna (Hinduism), the charioteer of Surya in Hinduism
- Aruna (Hittite mythology), a Hittite sea god
- Aruna Stambha, a monumental religious pillar in Puri, Odisha, India
- Arunachala (red mountain), a shaivite holy site in Tamil Nadu, India

== Other uses ==
- Aruna (given name)
- Aruna (surname)
- Aruna Mountains, Arunachal Pradesh, India
- 2313 Aruna, a minor planet

== See also ==
- Arun (disambiguation)
- Arūnas, a given name
- Anúna, an Irish choral ensemble
- Anura (disambiguation)
