= Arran =

Arran may refer to:

== Places ==
- Isle of Arran, Scotland
- Aran Islands, County Galway, Ireland
- Arran Island, New Zealand
- Arranmore, County Donegal, Ireland, also known in English as Aran Island
- Arran (Caucasus), or Caucasian Albania, a historical region
- Arran, Saskatchewan, Canada
- Arran, Syria, a village in Aleppo Governorate, Syria
- Arran–Elderslie, Ontario, Canada

== People ==
=== Given name ===
- Prince Arran, semi-legendary founder of Caucasian Albania
- Arran Brindle (born 1981), English female cricketer
- Arran Brown (born 1985), South African cyclist
- Arran Fernandez (born 1995), British mathematician
- Arran Gare (born 1948), Australian philosopher
- Arran Hoffmann (1902–1990), German sports shooter
- Arran Lee-Barrett (born 1984), English footballer
- Arran Pene (born 1967), New Zealand rugby player
- Arran Steele (born 1975), English cricketer
- Arran Stephens (born 1944), Canadian entrepreneur, author and philanthropist

=== Surname ===
- Len Arran (born 1961), English composer of film scores

=== Other names ===
- Earl of Arran (Ireland), a title in the Peerage of Ireland
- Earl of Arran (Scotland), a title in the Peerage of Scotland
- Lord of Arran, in High Medieval Scotland

== Ships ==
- Arran (1799 ship)
- MV Arran, 1953 Scottish ferry
- MV Isle of Arran, 1983 Scottish ferry

== Other uses ==
- Árran, the Lule Sámi center in Drag, Norway
- Árran (Sami publication), a news and culture magazine
- Arran (carpet), a variety of Karabakh carpets
- Arran (organization), the youth organization of the Catalan Independentist Left
- Arran distillery, in Lochranza, Scotland
- Arran, a fictional character in the game NightCaster
- Arran, a fictional character in the novel The Enemy

== See also ==
- Aran (disambiguation)
- Arun (disambiguation)
- Arran whitebeams, three species of whitebeam from the island of Arran, Scotland
