= Arun =

Arun may refer to:

== People ==
- Arun (given name)
  - Arun (actor), Indian actor
- Arun (surname)

== Places ==
- Arun, Badakhshan, Afghanistan
- Arun (England), a region of southeastern England
  - Arun District, West Sussex, England
- Arun Banner, an administrative division (banner) of Inner Mongolia, China
- Arun, Sumatra, a vassal state, now in Indonesia
- Arun gas field, Sumatra, Indonesia
- Aran va Bidgol ('Aran and Bidgol'), Isfahan Province, Iran
  - Aran va Bidgol County
- Arun rural municipality, Nepal
- Wat Arun, a temple in Bangkok, Thailand

== Rivers and canals ==
- Arun River, China–Nepal
- River Arun, in West Sussex, England
- Wey and Arun Canal, in the south east of England

== Other uses ==
- Aruṇa, a god in Hinduism
- Arun-class lifeboat
- HMS Arun, two ships of the Royal Navy
- Arun, a fictional character played by Sachin Pilgaonkar in the Indian films Ankhiyon Ke Jharokhon Se (1978) and Jaana Pehchana (2011)

== See also ==
- Aaron (disambiguation)
- Arran (disambiguation)
- Aruna (disambiguation)
- Arruns or Aruns, an Etruscan praenomen
- Arundel, a town in West Sussex, England
- SS Crown Arun, a 1938 cargo ship
- SS Empire Arun, a 1922 cargo ship
