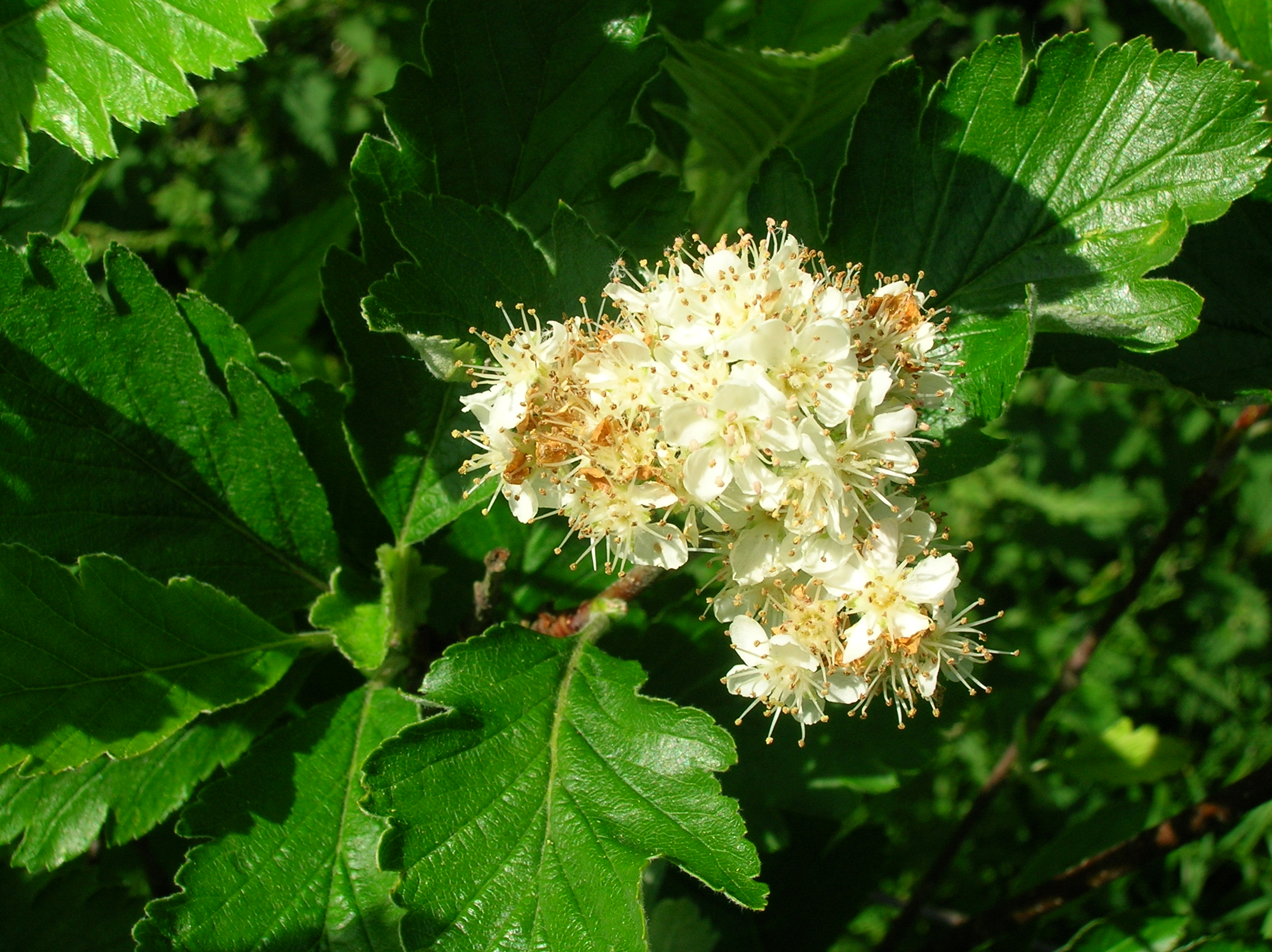

Conservation status
- Endangered (IUCN 3.1)

Scientific classification
- Kingdom: Plantae
- Clade: Tracheophytes
- Clade: Angiosperms
- Clade: Eudicots
- Clade: Rosids
- Order: Rosales
- Family: Rosaceae
- Genus: Hedlundia
- Species: H. arranensis

Binomial name
- Hedlundia arranensis (Hedl.) Sennikov & Kurtto

Synonyms
- Pyrus arranensis (Hedl.) Druce; Sorbus arranensis Hedl.; Sorbus intermedia var. arranensis (Hedl.) Rehder

= Hedlundia arranensis =

Species of flowering plant

Hedlundia arranensis, sometimes referred to as the Scottish or Arran whitebeam, is a species of plant in the family Rosaceae. It is endemic to the island of Arran in Scotland.

== Range and habitat ==
The species is threatened by habitat loss and only 283 Hedlundia arranensis were recorded as mature trees in 1980. They are protected in Glen Diomhan off Glen Catacol, which was formerly part of a National Nature Reserve; although this designation was removed in 2011 the area continues to form part of a designated Site of Special Scientific Interest (SSSI), and is monitored by staff from NatureScot. In its native states its distribution is restricted to Abhainn Bheag (Uisge Solus), Glen Diomhan (and tributary), Glen Catacol, Allt nan Calman, Allt Dubh, Gleann Easan Biorach and Glen Iorsa (Allt-nan-Champ). The trees are found in small remnants of woodland on inaccessible steep slopes, and grow on acidic soils.

Hedlundia arranensis evoked most collecting interest in 1870–1890 and 1920–1940, although older herbarium specimens exist.

== Evolution ==
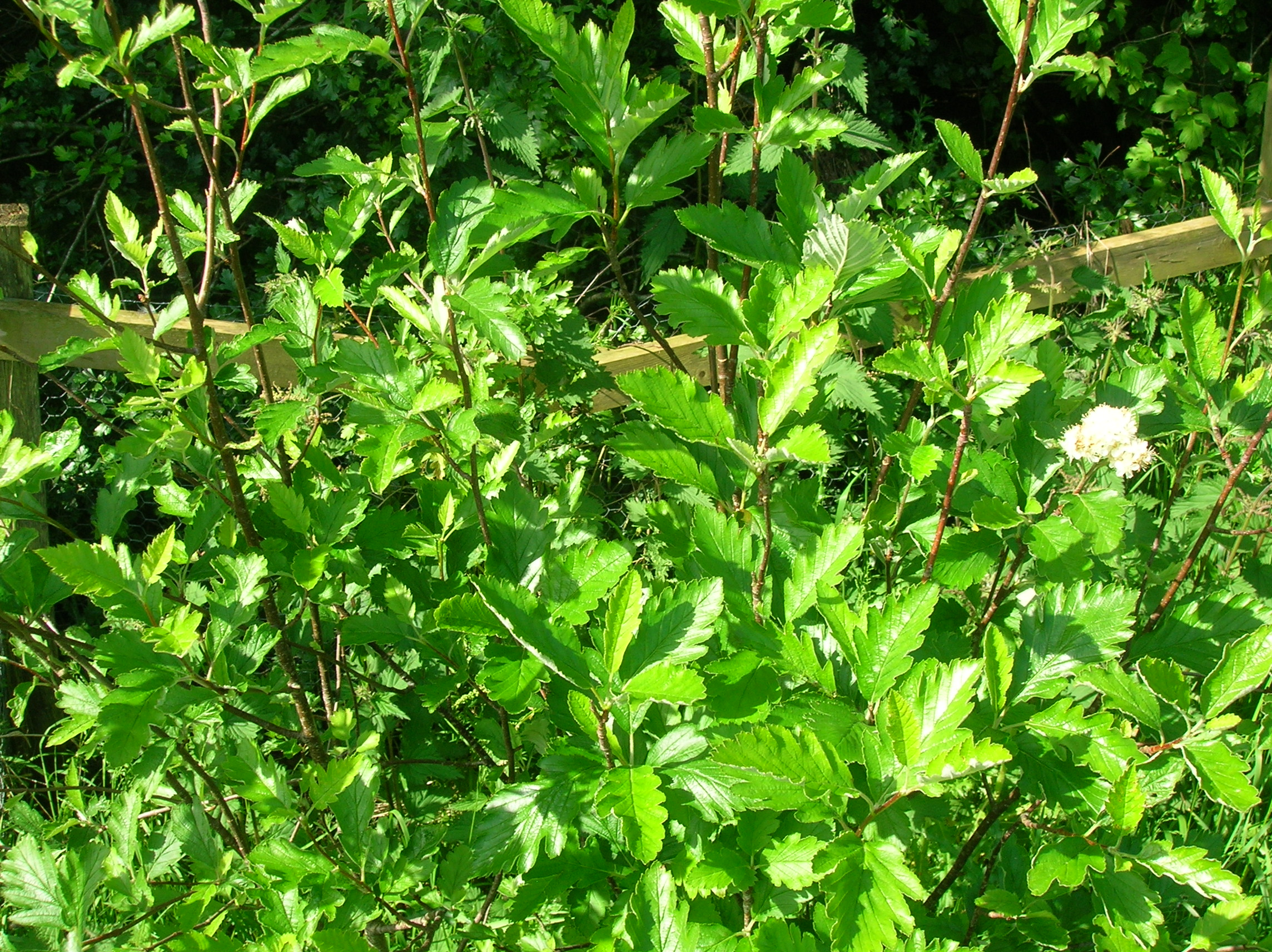
H. arranensis foliage in spring.

The whitebeams are apomictic, producing viable seed without the need for pollination and fertilisation. Each time this occurs, a new clone is effectively produced. The trees developed in a highly complex fashion, which involved the common whitebeam (Aria edulis) giving rise to the more robust rock whitebeam (Aria rupicola) which is still found on Holy Isle. This hybrid species interbred with the rowan/mountain ash (Sorbus aucuparia) to produce H. arranesis. The bastard mountain ash (Hedlundia pseudofennica) arose from a further cross between H. arranensis and the mountain ash (S. aucuparia).

Smart showed by using physical characteristics that the species were separate and not a result of random variation. Some overlap does however occur and this suggests that some hybridising may occur between H. arranensis and H. pseudofennica.

== See also ==
- Arran Whitebeams
