= Arun (surname) =

Arun is an Indian surname that may refer to the following notable people:

- Asim Arun (born 1970), Indian politician
- Avinash Arun, Indian cinematographer and film director
- Bharat Arun (born 1962), Indian Test cricketer
- Chinmayi Arun, Indian lawyer
- Gayatri Arun, Indian actress
- Ila Arun, Indian actress
- Masud Arun, Bangladesh Nationalist Party politician
- Parvathy Arun, Indian actress
- Priya Arun (born 1970), Indian actress
- Rajendra Arun (1945–2021), Indian scholar of the Ramayana and of Indian philosophy
- V. G. Arun, Indian judge
- Vinod Bala Arun, Indian philosophy scholar
