= Eigirdas =

Eigirdas, married female form Eigirdaitė, maiden name form Eigirdienė, is a Lithuanian name.

Notable people with this name include:

- Arūnas Eigirdas (born 1953), Lithuanian politician
- Eduardas Eigirdas (lt) (born 1970), Lithuanian journalist
- Eigirdas Žukauskas (born 1992), Lithuanian basketball player
