= Adam Summerfield =

English ice hockey player

- Born: 30 August 1990 (age 34); Whitehaven, England, U.K.
- Height: 5 ft 9 in (175 cm)
- Weight: 160 lb (73 kg; 11 st 6 lb)
- Position: Goaltender
- Catches: Left
- EPL team Former teams: Manchester Phoenix; Flintshire Flames
- Playing career: 2008–present

Adam Summerfield (born 30 August 1990 in Whitehaven, England) is an English professional ice hockey goaltender who played for the Manchester Phoenix in the EPL.

Summerfield played at Under-16 level with the Flintshire Flames, the junior team of the Flintshire Freeze. This led to his selection for the Under-18 squad of the Manchester Phoenix following trials at the Altrincham Ice Dome. Summerfield was promoted to the Elite League squad, replacing Aran Fox and Summerfield made his short debut coming on to replace Scott Fankhouser in a 5–2 loss for the Phoenix in Yorkshire against the Sheffield Steelers. Summerfield continued to make a number of appearances for the rest of the season, but was still employed as back-up.

He was re-signed by the Phoenix to play for the organisation in the 2009/10 season of the EPL.
