= Arran whitebeams =

Whitebeam species

The Arran whitebeams are species of whitebeam endemic to the island of Arran, Ayrshire, Scotland.

== Status ==
These trees, sometimes called the Scottish or Arran whitebeam (Sorbus arranensis), the bastard mountain ash or cut-leaved whitebeam (Sorbus pseudofennica) and the Catacol whitebeam (Sorbus pseudomeinichii) are, if rarity is measured by numbers alone, amongst the most endangered tree species in the world. They are protected in Glen Diomhan off Glen Catacol, which was formerly part of a National Nature Reserve; although this designation was removed in 2011 the area continues to form part of a designated Site of Special Scientific Interest (SSSI). Only 283 Arran whitebeam and 236 cut-leaved whitebeam were recorded as mature trees in 1980, and it is thought that grazing pressures and insect damage are preventing regeneration of the woodland.

They are typically trees of the mountain slopes, close to the tree line. However, they will grow at lower altitudes, and they are being grown within the Brodick Country Park. Also, North Ayrshire Council Parks and Recreation staff are growing specimens for conservation purposes. A few specialist garden centres and tree nurseries are able to supply them as grafts, and Ardrossan Academy in North Ayrshire has a grafted specimen for its use within the Scottish Higher Biology course in which it features as an example of evolution and survival of the fittest.

=== Distribution ===
- Sorbus arranensis: Abhainn Bheag (Uisge solus), Glen Diomhan (and tributary), Glen Catacol, Allt nan Calman, Allt Dubh, Gleann Easan Biorach and Glen Iorsa (Allt-nan-Champ).
- Sorbus pseudofennica: Abhainn Bheag (Uisge solus), Glen Diomhan and Allt nan Calma.
- Sorbus pseudomeinichii: Glen Catacol.

== History ==
The oldest preserved specimen is from the bastard mountain ash, S. pseudofennica, collected in 1797 from North Arran and another of the same species is in the British Museum dated 1838, when it was known as Pyrus pinnatifida (the pear group). S. pseudofennica was authoritatively recognised as a separate species by Clapham, Tutin and Warburg in 1952. Landsborough in 1875 noted the two kinds growing in Glen Diomhan and called them French rowan or whitebeams.

The Scottish mountain ash, S. arranensis, evoked most collecting interest in 1870–1890 and 1920–1940, although older herbarium specimens exist.

== Evolution ==
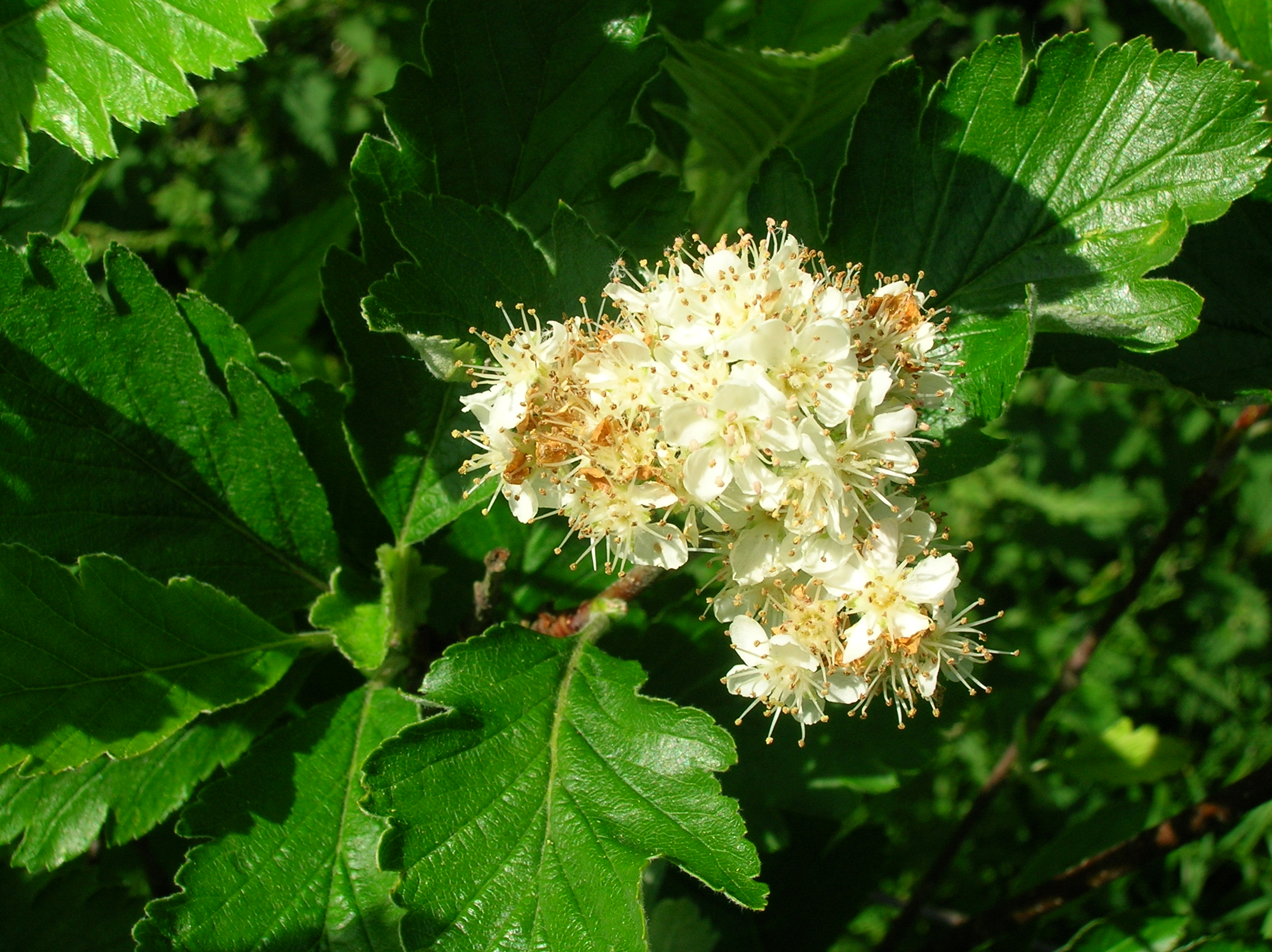
Sorbus arranensis in flower at Eglinton Country Park, Irvine.

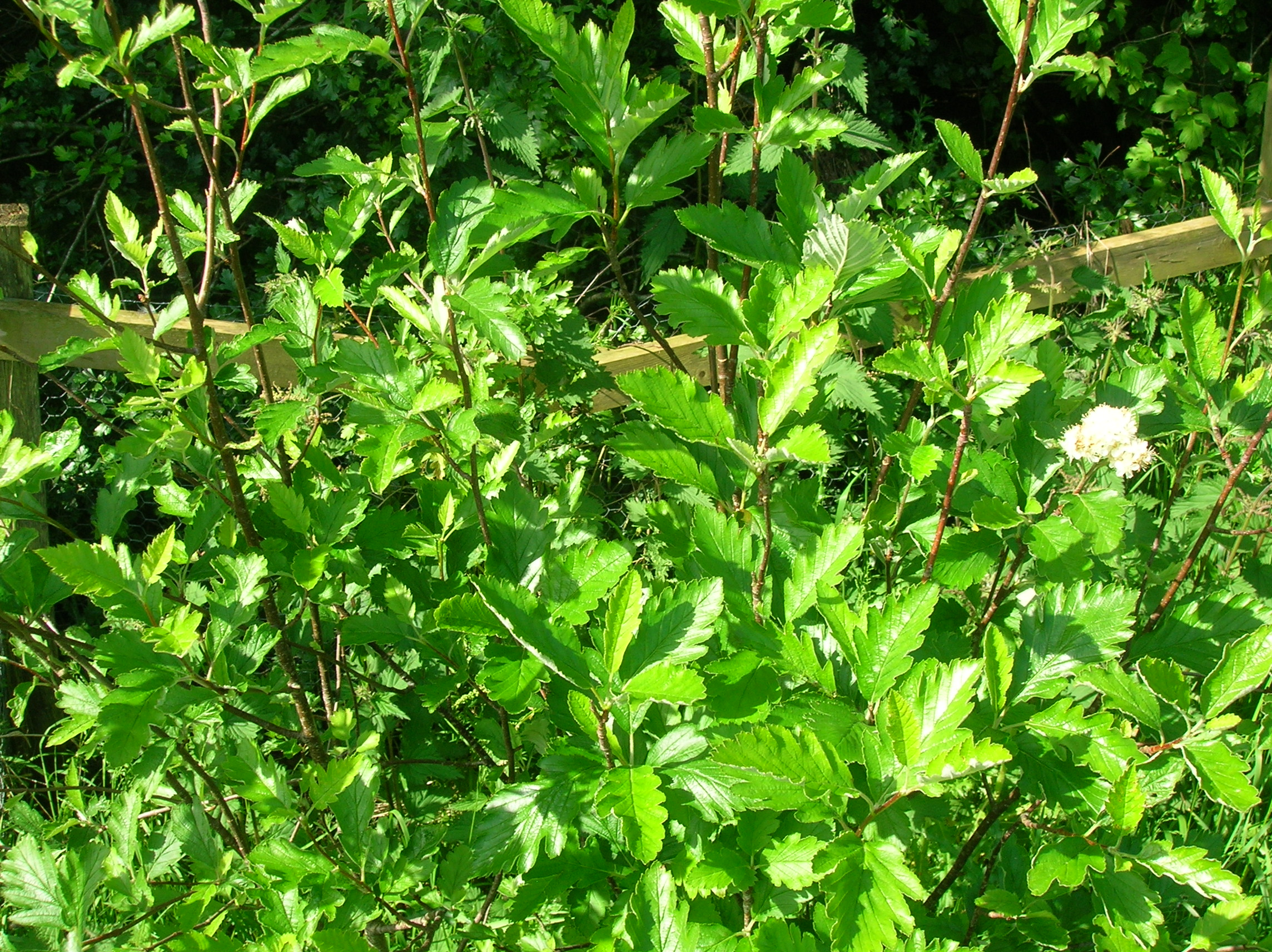
S. arranensis foliage in spring.

The trees developed in a highly complex fashion, which involved the common whitebeam (Sorbus aria) giving rise to the tetraploid rock whitebeam (Sorbus rupicola) which is still found on Holy Isle. This species is able to survive at higher altitudes and therefore occupies a less competitive niche with fewer tree species able to tolerate the harsher conditions. The rock whitebeam interbred with the rowan / mountain ash (Sorbus aucuparia) to produce the hybrid, a fertile separate species the Scottish whitebeam (Sorbus arranesis) which grows well in this zone of reduced competitive growth at higher altitudes. The bastard mountain ash (Sorbus pseudofennica) arose from a further cross between S. arranensis and the mountain ash (S. aucuparia).

The Sorbus group are apomictic, producing viable seed without the need for pollination and fertilisation. Each time this hybrid cross occurs a new clone is effectively produced.

Smart showed by using physical characteristics that the species were separate and not a result of random variation. Some overlap does however occur and this suggests that some hybridising may occur between the two species.

A number of other Sorbus species have been produced in this way, such as the Devon whitebeam, the Bristol whitebeam, the Cheddar whitebeam, Irish whitebeam, Lancaster whitebeam, etc. All are rare and require careful protection and expert habitat management if they are to survive in the wild.

In Scandinavia, particularly Norway, similar species have evolved following similar evolutionary pressures, but quite independently of the Arran whitebeams.

Islands are well known as sites of endemic species. The Lundy cabbage (Coincya wrightii) is another British example, only growing on Lundy Island off the North Devon coast.

== Characteristics ==
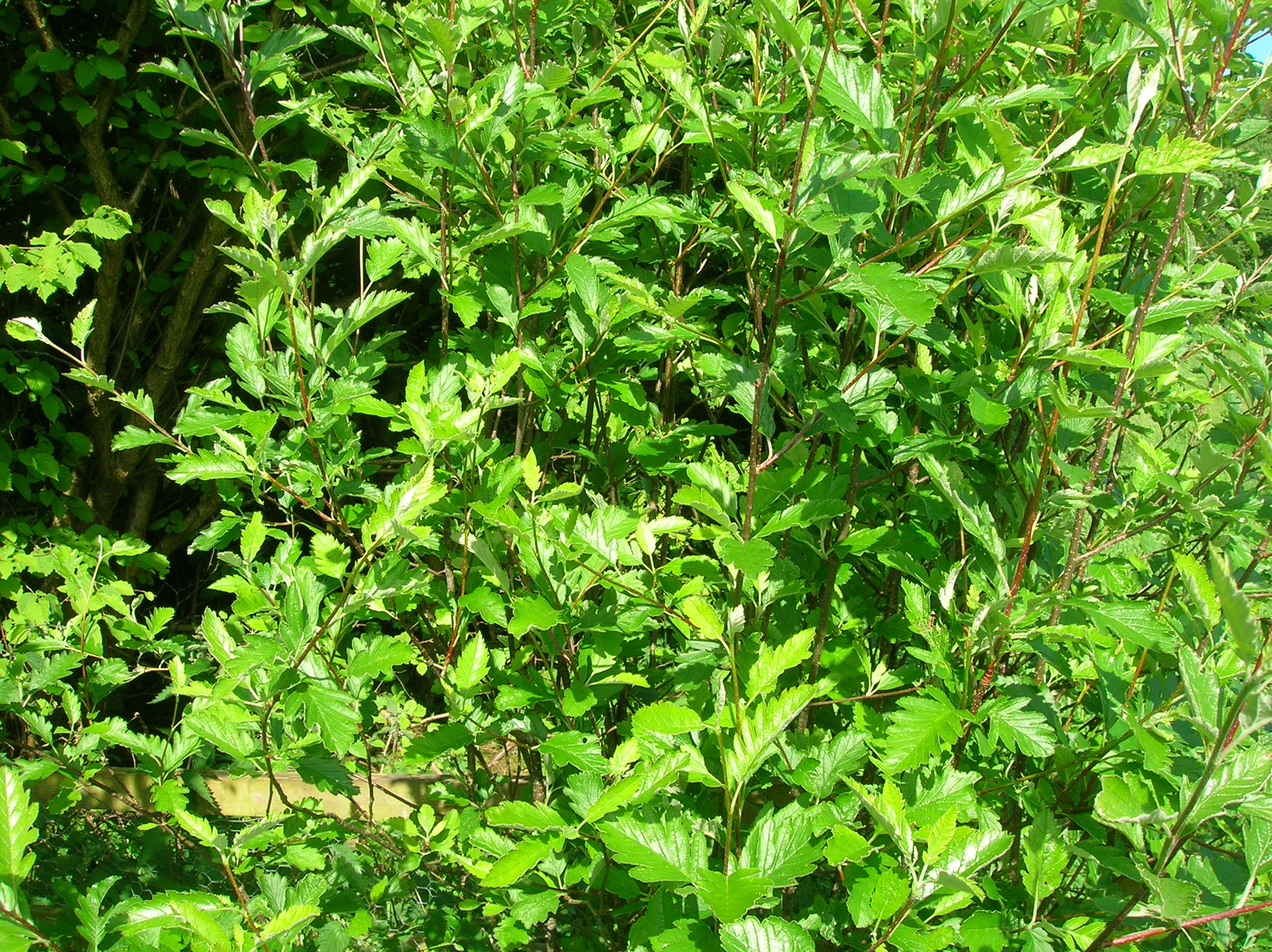
Sorbus pseudofennica at Eglinton Country Park, Ayrshire.

The mountain ash has a leaf made up of a number of leaflets, whilst the whitebeam leaf is entire and doesn't even have lobes. The result of crossing the two is that the hybrids begin to merge or mix characteristics, so that S. arranensis has lobes but no leaflets, while S. pseudofennica, having an extra cross with the "leafleted" mountain ash, has a variable number of true leaflets and lobes. These characteristics are not always definitive and sometimes the actual species cannot be ascertained with certainty, possibly due to hybridisation between the species in question.

Some differences in the flower and seed characteristics are also noted.

Unlike other endemic British species, they do not seem to grow on base-rich soils.

== Future prospects ==
Although actual numbers haven't dropped since the first quantitative survey was carried out in 1897, this may be a false impression, since with more searching more have been found, which does not necessarily suggest a stable population. Various attempts at introducing saplings grown from native seed have had widely differing degrees of success.

Grazing by sheep has probably reduced the population from being widespread and numerous to what it is now, confined to steep slopes, cracks in rocks, and restricted to the mountainous northern end of the island.

The trees are not well known to the islanders and two fine specimens were even cut down in the 1980s by a professional gardener working at a site near Brodick Castle. The Ranger's Service have taken steps to increase the distribution of the trees, planting both species in the park. However, a great deal more could be done to make visitors and islanders aware of these unique species possessed by Arran.

== Catacol whitebeam – a new species ==
In 2007, it was announced that two specimens of the newly named Catacol whitebeam (Sorbus pseudomeinichii) had been discovered by researchers on Arran. The tree is again a cross between the native rowan and whitebeam, the discovery being made following work by Scottish Natural Heritage (SNH), Dougarie Estate and Royal Botanic Garden Edinburgh. Research into the genetics of whitebeam trees had shown that the population was much more diverse than previously thought and that the Arran whitebeams seem to be gradually evolving towards a new type of tree which will in all likelihood look very similar to a rowan.

A team from the Royal Botanic Gardens collected seeds and cuttings to ensure the long-term survival of the trees and steps were taken to protect the two known specimens.

As of 2016, only one of the two specimens could be found.

== See also ==
- Eglinton Country Park Arran whitebeams on the mainland.
