= Arūnas =

Arūnas is a masculine Lithuanian given name and may refer to:

- Arūnas Bižokas (born 1978), ballroom dancer
- Arūnas Bubnys (born 1961), historian and archivist
- Arūnas Degutis (born 1958), politician
- Arūnas Dulkys (born 1972), economist and Minister of Health
- Arūnas Eigirdas (born 1953), politician
- Arūnas Gelažninkas (born 1985), motocross, enduro and rally raid rider
- Arūnas Jurkšas (born 1972), track and field athlete
- Arūnas Klimavičius (born 1982), footballer
- Arūnas Matelis (born 1961), documentary film director
- Arūnas Mika (born 1970), footballer
- Arūnas Mikalauskas (born 1997), basketball player
- Arūnas Pukelevičius (born 1973), footballer
- Arūnas Savickas (born 1975), retired freestyle swimmer
- Arūnas Valinskas (born 1966), showman, TV producer and host, and politician
- Arunas Vasys (born 1943), American football player
- Arūnas Visockas (born 1965), Lithuanian basketball player
