= World Hindi Conference =

Triennial linguistics conference

विश्व हिंदी सम्मेलन Vishva Hindi Sammelan World Hindi Conference
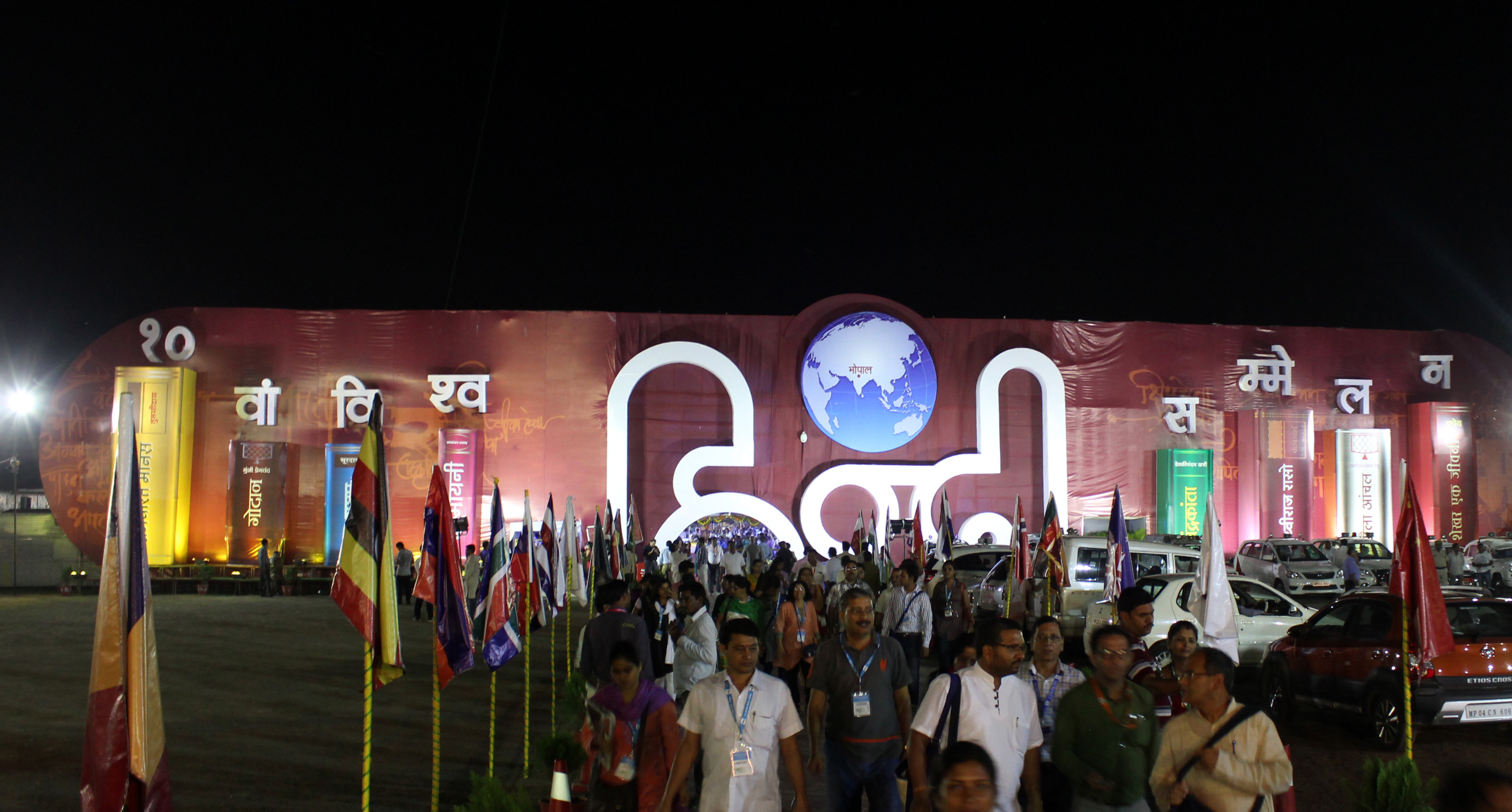
- 10th Vishva Hindi Sammelan held at kareli, India
- Status: active
- Genre: Conference
- Frequency: Once in 3 Years
- Years active: 51
- Inaugurated: 10 January 1975
- Previous event: 2018
- Next event: 2022
- Patron: Government of India
- Website: vishwahindisammelan.gov.in/index.htm

The World Hindi Conference (Hindi: विश्व हिंदी सम्मेलन, romanized as Vishva Hindi Sammelan) is a world conference celebrating the Modern Standard Hindi register of the Hindustani language. It consists of several Hindi scholars, writers and laureates from different parts of the world who contribute to the language.

== List of conferences ==
World Hindi Conference
| # | Date | City | Country |
|---|---|---|---|
| 1 | 10-12 January 1975 | Nagpur | India |
| 2 | 28-30 August 1976 | Port Louis | Mauritius |
| 3 | 24-28 October 1983 | New Delhi | India |
| 4 | 2-4 December 1993 | Port Louis | Mauritius |
| 5 | 4-8 April 1996 | Port of Spain | Trinidad and Tobago |
| 6 | 14-18 September 1999 | London | United Kingdom |
| 7 | 5-9 June 2003 | Paramaribo | Suriname |
| 8 | 13-15 July 2007 | New York City | United States |
| 9 | 22-24 September 2012 | Johannesburg | South Africa |
| 10 | 10-12 September 2015 | Bhopal | India |
| 11 | 18-20 August 2018 | Port Louis | Mauritius |
| 12 | 15-17 February 2023 | Fiji | Fiji |

== History ==
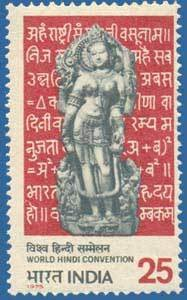
Stamp of India - 1975 - Saraswati Goddess of learning - inscription in Hindi

The first World Hindi Conference was inaugurated on 10 January 1975 by the then Prime Minister of India Indira Gandhi. It was held from 10 to 12 January 1975 in Nagpur. Seewoosagur Ramgoolam, then Prime Minister of Mauritius attended the conference as the chief guest. 122 delegates from 30 countries participated in the conference. Ninth World Hindi Conference was held from 22 to 24 September 2012 in Johannesburg, South Africa. The conference was inaugurated by Indian Minister of State for External Affairs Preneet Kaur and South African Finance Minister Pravin Gordhan.

The tenth World Hindi Conference is being organized from 10 to 12 September 2015 in the city of Bhopal by the Ministry of External Affairs, government of India along with the partnership of the government of Madhya Pradesh. The decision to organize the tenth conference in India was taken at the ninth conference held in Johannesburg in September 2012. The eleventh conference was hosted by Mauritius. The twelfth conference will be hosted by Fiji. World Hindi Day is celebrated each year on 10 January with events organized by the National Council of Indian Culture, Hindi Nidhi Foundation, Indian High Commission, Mahatma Gandhi Institute for Cultural Co-operation, and the Sanatan Dharma Maha Sabha.

== See also ==
- Hindi Divas
- World Hindi Secretariat
- World Tamil Conference
- World Telugu Conference
