= Vinod Bala Arun =

Indian academic

- Born: Jalandhar, Punjab, India
- Occupation: Scholar

Dr Vinod Bala (Vinoo) Arun is the President of the Ramayana Centre, set up by an Act of the Parliament of Mauritius in 2001 for the promotion of the values of the Ramayana worldwide.

Prior to taking on her role at the Ramayana Centre, Dr Arun was the former and first secretary-general of the World Hindi Secretariat, an organisation set up by the governments of India and Mauritius to promote Hindi across the world.

She is a Hindi, Sanskrit and Indian Philosophy scholar who was awarded a PhD degree from the University of Mauritius, sponsored by the Tertiary Education Commission on the topic, "A comparative study of the ethical values in Ramayana and Ramacharitmanasa and their impact on the Hindu Society of Mauritius". Arun was the first Sanskrit education officer and one of the first to teach Hindi literature in Mauritius. Subsequently, she was a senior lecturer in Indian philosophy at the University of Mauritius from 2002 to 2010.

== Positions held ==
- Senior Lecturer in Sanskrit and Indian Philosophy, Mahatma Gandhi Institute, University of Mauritius, 2002-2010.
- First ever Secretary General of the World Hindi Secretariat, 2007-2010.
- President of the Ramayana Centre, 2021 - now.
- Creator and presenter of various TV and radio programmes at the Mauritius Broadcasting Corporation, 1994 - now.

== Publications ==
- Mauritius Ki Hindi Katha Yatra. This was the first critical research on the history of Hindi story writing in Mauritius.
- Rama Katha Mein Naitik Mulya
- Stuti Suman
- Sanskar Ramayana also available in English
- Ram Kaaj Karibe Ko Aatur an anthology about Pt Rajendra Arun edited by Dr Arun and Prabhat Kumar
- Devi Vandana
- Lakshman Gun Gatha

== Radio and TV work ==
Since 1994, Dr Arun has been creating and delivering popular programmes on radio and TV in Mauritius. She is currently presenting Manas Manthan and Manas Moti - respectively weekly and fortnightly radio programmes on the Ramacharitmanas on the Mauritius Broadcasting Corporation.

Her past programmes include:

Radio:

- Navneet, 1994 - 2015. Explanation and interpretation within a modern context of philosophical movie and non-movie songs. Fortnightly, 30 min programme.
- Chayanika, 1994 - 2015. Explanation and interpretation within a modern context of great Hindi poetry. Fortnightly, 30 min programme.
- Prarthna, (1994 - 2015)/Jeevan Path, (2015 - now). Explanation and interpretation of popular and important Hindu prayers, mantras and scriptures including the pioneering work of explaining the entirety of the Bhagavada Gita and the Upanishads in an accessible manner to a modern audience. Weekly.
- Jivan Jyoti, 1995 - 2015. Explanation and interpretation within a modern context of golden sayings in Sanskrit. Weekly.

TV:

- Prateek, 2001 - 2003. A series of 27 min programmes on symbolism in Hinduism.
- Many other one-off programs such as Matabhumi, on the environment, Yatra, on Shiv Ratri, and programmes on World Hindi Day from 2007 - 2009.
- An Encounter with Dr Arun - Interview at the Mauritius Broadcasting Corporation
- Interview at the Doordarshan

== Awards ==
- Manas Sangam Sahitya Samman awarded by Manas Sangam, Kanpur, India
- Dharma Bhushan awarded by Vishwa Hindu Parishad, Mauritius
- Sahitya Shiromani awarded by Akhil Vishwa Hindu Samiti, New York
- Pravasi Bharatiya Hindi Bhushan Samman awarded by Uttar Pradesh Hindi Sansthaan
