= Musavar =

Human settlement in Azerbaijan

Coordinates: 38°53′N 48°25′E

Musavar is a village in the municipality of Aran in the Lerik Rayon of Azerbaijan.
