= World Hindi Secretariat =

International Organization promoting Hindi

विश्व हिन्दी सचिवालय (World Hindi Secretariat)
- Headquarters: Independence Street, Phoenix, Mauritius
- Official language: Hindi
- Membership: 5 states: India; Mauritius; Fiji; Suriname; Nepal

Leaders

Establishment
  - World Hindi Conference Nagpur: 1975
  - Memorandum of Understanding: 20 August 1999

Population
  - 2017 estimate: ~ 400 million (primary language)
- Website vishwahindi.com

World Hindi Secretariat (WHS) (Hindi: विश्व हिन्दी सचिवालय, romanized: Viśva Hindī Sacivālaya) is an international organisation of nations and regions where Hindi is the first or customary language with significant proportion of population consisting of Hindi speakers and/or with notable affiliation with North Indian culture. WHS is focused on promoting Hindi as an international language and furthering the cause of recognition of Hindi as an official language of the United Nations. India has been trying to get 129 votes at the United Nations to make Hindi an official language of the UN. WHS is head quartered at Vacoas-Phoenix city in Plaines Wilhems District of Mauritius.

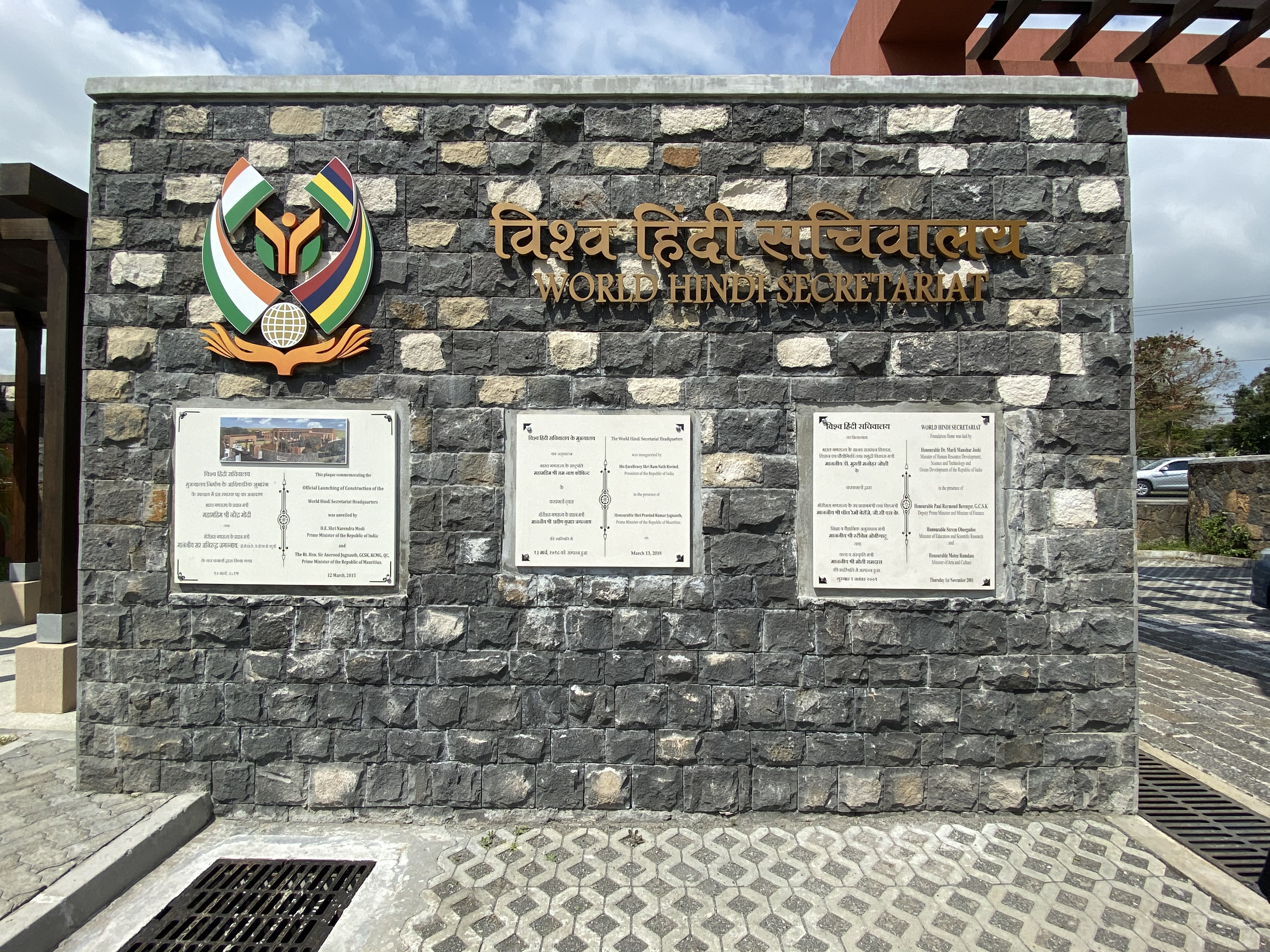
Entrance of World Hindi Secreteriat office in Mauritius

WHA was set up in 1999 by governments of India and Mauritius to promote Hindi across the world, Vinod Bala Arun became was the first secretary-general of WHS.

== History ==
=== Origin of WHS (1975-1999) ===
During the first World Hindi Conference held in Nagpur in 1975, the idea of setting up a World Hindi Center was presented by Sir Shivsagar Ramgoolam, the then Prime Minister of Mauritius and President of the delegation. This idea took the form of determination to the idea of establishing the World Hindi Secretariat in Mauritius after the brainstorming at the Second World Hindi Conference held in Mauritius and in many World Hindi Conferences continuously. An agreement was signed between the Government of India and the Mauritian Government and the Act was passed in the Legislative Assembly of Mauritius.

After the 5th World Hindi Conference in Trinidad and Tobago in April 1996, Mauritius Government appointed Dr Smt Sarita Budhu as an advisor in the Ministry of Education and Scientific Research for the works related to the creation of the World Hindi Secretariat. In June 1996, a unit of World Hindi Secretariat was set up in the Ministry of Education and Scientific Research in Mauritius with the assistance of Government of India through the High Commission of India.

On 20 August 1999 the Government of Mauritius and Government of India signed an agreement relating to the objectives, operational and financing of secretariat in Port Louis, Mauritius. The then Minister of Education and Scientific Research, Hon'ble Ramasamy, Mr. Chhedambram Pillay and the then Indian High Commissioner, HE Mr. M.L. Tripathi represented his own governments. The Mauritius government provided land in Phoenix for the construction of World Hindi Secretariat headquarter and the Government of India took responsibility for the cost of construction and construction of the building.

=== Establishment of WHS temporary office (2001) ===
On 1 November 2001, the foundation stone of the World Hindi Secretariat was laid on the land provided by the Mauritian government in the hands of the Mauritian government, the then Indian Human Resources Development, Science and Technology and Marine Development Minister, Hon. Murli Manohar Joshi, The then Deputy Prime Minister and Finance Minister, Honorable Pol Raimon Berenze, G.O.K.K., the then Education and Scientific Research in the presence of Honorable Moti Ramadoss, Minister of Honor, Hon. Steven Obigadu and then Minister of Arts and Culture, were present.

=== World Hindi Secretariat Act (2002) ===
On 12 November 2002, the Mauritius government passed the Act relating to the establishment and management of the World Hindi Secretariat. The secretariat was established with the aim of preparing the stage for the formation of Hindi as an international language and making Hindi an official language of the United Nations.

On 21 November 2003, an agreement related to the formation and working practices of the World Hindi Secretariat between the Mauritius Government and the Government of India was signed in New Delhi. Mr. H. Gannu, Cabinet Secretary represented the Government of Mauritius and Mr. Jagdish Chandra Sharma, Secretary (PCD), Government of India.

=== Proclamation of World Hindi Secretariat Act (2005) ===
The Proclamation of the World Hindi Secretariat Act passed in Mauritius National Assembly in November 2002 was announced on 12 September 2005. On 11 February 2008, the World Hindi Secretariat officially started functioning. The functioning was led by the Secretary General Dr. Mrs Vinod Bala Arun and the Deputy General Secretary Dr. Rajendra Prasad Mishra.

In 2012, a proposal was passed on the concluding day of the Ninth World Hindi Conference in Johannesburg to make Hindi one of the official languages of the UN.

The World Hindi Secretariat was asked to prepare a database of global institutions involved in promotion and teaching of Hindi. A database for Hindi scholars was also asked to be prepared.

On 12 March 2015, Prime Minister of the Republic of India in the Fenix, His Excellency Mr. Narendra Modi and the Prime Minister of the Republic of Mauritius, Honorable Sir Anirudh Jagannath, G.C.S.K. KCMG, QC The official launch of the construction of World Hindi Secretariat headquarter in the hands of On the occasion, a memorial plaque was unveiled by the two Prime Ministers in the presence of Mauritius Education and Human Resources, Tertiary Education and Scientific Research Minister, Honorary Mrs. Leela-Devi Srimin-Lachuman.

== Organisational structure ==
In 2015, prime minister of India, Narendra Modi laid the foundation stone of the secretariat in Mauritius. He also praised Mauritius for promoting Hindi literature.

== See also ==
- Greater India
- Indianisation
- Indian diaspora
- India–Mauritius relations
- Indosphere
- Pravasi Bharatiya Divas
- Sanskritisation

By ISO 639-3 code
Enter an ISO code to find the corresponding language article.
