= Quercus lodicosa =

Conservation status
- Endangered (IUCN 3.1)

Scientific classification
- Kingdom: Plantae
- Clade: Embryophytes
- Clade: Tracheophytes
- Clade: Angiosperms
- Clade: Eudicots
- Clade: Rosids
- Order: Fagales
- Family: Fagaceae
- Genus: Quercus
- Subgenus: Quercus subg. Cerris
- Section: Quercus sect. Ilex
- Species: Q. lodicosa

Binomial name
- Quercus lodicosa O.E.Warb. & E.F.Warb.

Species of flowering plant

Quercus lodicosa is a species of oak. It is a tree native to Assam state in northeastern India, northern Myanmar, and southeastern Tibet. It is known from several widely separated populations and herbarium collections, where it grows in tropical and subtropical moist montane forests from 1,800 to 3,000 metres elevation.
