= Rajendra Arun =

Indian academic (1945–2021)

- Born: Narwa Pitambarpur, Uttar Pradesh, India
- Occupation: Scholar

Rajendra Arun (29 July 1945 – 21 June 2021) was a scholar of the Ramayana and of Indian Philosophy. He was the founder and president of the Ramayana Centre, set up by an Act of the Parliament of Mauritius in 2001 to promote and propagate the Ramayana and the spiritual, social and cultural values flowing therefrom.

Pandit Arun was famous worldwide for his books on the Ramayana, starting from Hari Katha Ananta, published in 1983 to Manas Mein Nari, published in 2010 and for his radio programs broadcast on Mauritian national radio since 1983. An eminence on the Ramayana, Mr Arun gave many invited talks across the world on the subject.

Rajendra Arun has his own place among the narrators of Ramcharitmanas. He was unique in his style, as he engaged his audience and readers in a manner that is neither unnecessarily melodramatic nor philosophically dry. He narrated the story of Ramayana in a very articulate and lucid way so that the listeners while enjoying it, were immensely inspired. He had earned the adulation of his readers and recognition of critics and institutions around the world. Rajendra Arun was born on July 29, 1945, in Naravapitambarpur village in Faizabad district, Uttar Pradesh, India. He adopted journalism after acquiring a Masters, in Hindi from Allahabad University. In 1973, he went to Mauritius and became the managing editor of the 'Janata' Hindi weekly owned by the then Prime Minister Sir Seewoosagur Ramgoolam. He also received the support of the founder of the Seva Shivir socio-cultural movement Swami Krishnanand Maharaj. He had also been appointed the representative of 'Samachar' and United News of India (UNI). Presently he is the founder and Chairman of Ramayana Centre, a first institution of its kind in the World set up by an Act of Parliament. Under his leadership, the Ramayana Centre is actively promoting and propagating the spiritual, social and cultural values flowing therefrom.

== Publications ==
Rajendra Arun wrote 8 books in Hindi on various characters and aspects of Ramcharitmanas, of which 5 subsequently been translated into English. All of his books have been published by Prabhat Prakashan based in New Delhi, India.

- Hari Katha Anantaa
- Bharat Gun Gatha
- Jag Janani Janaki
- Jag Rom Rom Mein Rama
- Raghukul Reeti Sada
- Taju Sansay Bhaju Rama
- Ath Kaikeyi Katha
- Manas Mein Nari
