= Aran Island =

Aran Island may refer to several places:

- Arranmore or Aran Island, off the coast of County Donegal in Ireland
- Aran Islands, three islands in Galway Bay in Ireland
- Isle of Arran, one of the islands of the lower Firth of Clyde in Scotland
- Arran Island, New Zealand

== See also ==
- Aran (disambiguation)
