= Aruna (given name) =

Aruna is a Hindic, mostly feminine, given name that may refer to the following notable people:

- Aruna (singer) (born 1975), American musician
- Aruna Asaf Ali (1909–1996), Indian educator, activist, and publisher
- Aruna Balraj (fl. from 2006), Indian film actress
- Aruna Biswas (fl. from 1986), Bangladeshi actress
- Aruna Chaudhary (born 1957), Indian politician
- Aruna Darshana (born 1999), Sri Lankan sprinter
- Aruna De Silva (born 1961), Sri Lankan cricketer
- Aruna Dhathathreyan (fl. 2000s), Indian biophysicist
- Aruna Dindane (born 1980), Ivorian football player
- Aruna Gunawardene (born 1969), Sri Lankan cricketer
- Aruna Irani (born 1946), Indian actress
- Aruna Jayanthi (fl. 2000s), Indian businesswoman
- Aruna Kori (born 1973), Indian politician
- Aruna Kumari Galla (born 1944), Indian politician
- Aruna Lama (1945–1998), Indian singer
- Aruna Mishra (fl. from 2003), female Indian boxer
- Aruna Mohanty (born 1960), Odissi dancer
- Aruna Miller (born 1964), Indian-American politician
- Aruna Raje (born 1946), Indian film director
- Aruna Ramchandra Dhere (born 1957), Marathi writer
- Aruna Reddy (born 1995), Indian artistic gymnast
- Aruna Roy (born 1946), Indian political and social activist
- Aruna Sairam (born 1952), Indian classical vocalist
- Aruna Shanbaug (1948–2015), subject of an Indian euthanasia court case
- Aruna Shields (fl. from 2002), British-Indian actress
- Aruna Sundararajan (fl. from 1982), Indian civil servant
- Aruna Vasudev (born 1936), Indian scholar on Asian cinema
