= Hedlundia pseudomeinichii =

Catacol whitebeam

Conservation status
- Critically Endangered (IUCN 3.1)

Scientific classification
- Kingdom: Plantae
- Clade: Tracheophytes
- Clade: Angiosperms
- Clade: Eudicots
- Clade: Rosids
- Order: Rosales
- Family: Rosaceae
- Genus: Hedlundia
- Species: H. pseudomeinichii

Binomial name
- Hedlundia pseudomeinichii (Ashley Robertson) Sennikov & Kurtto

Synonyms
- Pyrus pseudomeinichii (Ashley Robertson) M.F.Fay & Christenh.; Sorbus pseudomeinichii Ashley Robertson

Species of tree

Hedlundia pseudomeinichii, known as false rowan and Catacol whitebeam, is a rare species of tree endemic to the Isle of Arran in south-western Scotland. It is believed to have arisen as a hybrid of the native European rowan (Sorbus aucuparia) and the cut-leaved whitebeam (Hedlundia pseudofennica) which is in turn a rowan/Arran whitebeam (Hedlundia arranensis) hybrid. Until 2020, only one living specimens of the Catacol whitebeam was known, at the time making it the rarest tree not only in Scotland, but joint rarest in the world with Wood's cycad. Another was recorded as a sapling, but is believed to have been destroyed by deer. A seedling and grafted plants have also been grown in Edinburgh.

The latest evaluation by IUCN failed to find one of the two trees found, so they state in the red list citation for the species that only one tree is left. During September 2020 a second tree was discovered and confirmed by Dr Ashley Robertson as a new location for the taxon, rather than the rediscovery of one of the two previously known plants that had been lost'.

The discovery followed work in the 1990s by Scottish Natural Heritage (SNH), Dougarie Estate and Royal Botanic Garden Edinburgh. The trees were confirmed as a distinct species by DNA testing.

Graeme Walker of SNH has said:

"These are unique trees which are native to Arran and not found anywhere else in the world, we knew about the Arran whitebeam and the cut-leaved Arran whitebeam, which are also crosses between rowan and different species of whitebeam, but it has been really exciting to discover a completely new species. It is very complex picture but we think that the Arran whitebeams are gradually evolving towards a new type of tree which will probably look very similar to a rowan."

Dr. Ashley Robertson of Bristol University, who helped discover the species, said: "It is not an evolutionary dead end. It is evolution in action".

The new species is the third endemic whitebeam found on Arran (after the Arran whitebeam and the cut-leaved whitebeam) and combines the red berries of a rowan with the oval leaves of a whitebeam. The trees are currently within a deer fence which will be extended - delivery of materials by helicopter will be necessary due to the remoteness of the location. The species is named after Glen Catacol where it was found and the largest of the only known remaining trees may be over 50 years old.
