= Anura, Varanasi =

Anaura
- Village
- Village location on Varanasi district map Anaura (Uttar Pradesh) Anaura (India)
- Coordinates: 25.374350°N 82.892324°E
- Country: India
- State: Uttar Pradesh
- District: Varanasi district
- Tehsil: Pindra
- Elevation: 81.263 m (266.61 ft)

Population (2011)
  - Total: 1,178

Languages
  - Official: Hindi
- Time zone: UTC+5:30 (IST)
- Postal code: 221206
- Telephone code: +91-542
- Vehicle registration: UP65 XXXX
- Village code: 208820
- Lok Sabha constituency: Varanasi
- Vidhan Sabha constituency: Pindra

Anura is a village in Pindra Tehsil of Varanasi district in the Indian state of Uttar Pradesh. Anura is within the Karoma gram panchayat. The village is about 18.5 kilometers North-West of Varanasi city, 321 kilometers South-East of state capital Lucknow and 797 kilometers South-East of the national capital Delhi.

== Demography ==
Anura has a total population of 1,178 people amongst 171 families. Sex ratio of Anura is 894 and child sex ratio is 926. Uttar Pradesh state average for both ratios is 912 and 902 respectively.

Details	Male	Female	Total	Comments				
Number of houses	-	-	171	(census 2011) |-	Adult	527	468	995
Children (0–6 years)	95	88	183	(census 2011) |-				
Total population	622	556	1,178	(census 2011) |-				
Literacy	70.21%	51.71%	61.51%	(census 2011) |-				

== Transportation ==
Anura can be accessed by road and does not have a railway station of its own. Nearest operational airports are Varanasi airport (16 kilometers North-West) and Allahabad Airports (135 kilometers West).

== See also ==
- Pindra Tehsil
- Pindra (Assembly constituency)
