= Aran, Yevlakh =

Aran
- Municipality
- Location within Azerbaijan
- Coordinates: 40°37′31″N 46°58′32″E
- Country: Azerbaijan
- Rayon: Yevlakh

Population (2021)
  - Total: 7.987
- Time zone: UTC+4 (AZT)
  - Summer (DST): UTC+5 (AZT)

Aran (previously known as İyirmi Səkkiz Aprel, 28 Aprel, and 28 Aprelya) is a village and the most populous municipality in the Yevlakh Rayon of Azerbaijan. It has a population of 11.587

== Climate ==
Yevlakh has a semi-arid climate (Köppen climate classification: BSk).

Climate data for Aran
Month	Jan	Feb	Mar	Apr	May	Jun	Jul	Aug	Sep	Oct	Nov	Dec	Year
Mean daily maximum °C (°F)	7.2 (45.0)	8.7 (47.7)	13.1 (55.6)	21.5 (70.7)	26.4 (79.5)	30.2 (86.4)	34.3 (93.7)	32.9 (91.2)	28.7 (83.7)	21.4 (70.5)	14.4 (57.9)	9.5 (49.1)	20.7 (69.3)
Daily mean °C (°F)	2.0 (35.6)	3.2 (37.8)	7.3 (45.1)	14.4 (57.9)	19.9 (67.8)	24.4 (75.9)	27.8 (82.0)	26.4 (79.5)	22.3 (72.1)	15.1 (59.2)	9.3 (48.7)	4.5 (40.1)	14.7 (58.5)
Mean daily minimum °C (°F)	−1.5 (29.3)	0.0 (32.0)	4.1 (39.4)	9.1 (48.4)	14.1 (57.4)	18.5 (65.3)	21.6 (70.9)	20.4 (68.7)	16.8 (62.2)	10.9 (51.6)	5.5 (41.9)	0.9 (33.6)	10.0 (50.0)
Average precipitation mm (inches)	16 (0.6)	20 (0.8)	22 (0.9)	34 (1.3)	47 (1.9)	45 (1.8)	22 (0.9)	22 (0.9)	17 (0.7)	49 (1.9)	25 (1.0)	20 (0.8)	339 (13.3)
Average precipitation days	4	5	6	6	7	5	3	2	3	5	4	4	54
Mean monthly sunshine hours	104.5	97.7	130.4	189.6	222.3	262.2	280.1	261.1	217.9	162.3	112.4	104.5	2,145
Source: NOAA

== History ==
Founded in 1935, Aran is the largest settlement in the Yevlakh Rayon. During the Soviet period, the settlement was prominent for its livestock farming. It was officially granted urban-type settlement status in 1946.
