= HMS Arun =

HMS Arun is the name of two of Royal Navy vessels, named after the English River Arun:

- HMS Arun (1903), a River-class destroyer built by Cammell Laird, Birkenhead, launched in 1903 and completed later that year. The ship was sold for scrap in 1920.
- HMS Arun (M2014), a River-class minesweeper, launched at Lowestoft in 1985. The vessel was sold to the Brazilian Navy in 1998, and renamed successively Hercules, Jose Bonifacio and Babitonga.
