= Aruna (surname) =

Aruna is a Hindic surname that may refer to the following notable people:

- Ade Aruna (born 1994), Nigerian player of American football
- Aladi Aruna (1933–2004), Indian politician
- D. K. Aruna (fl. 1994), Indian politician
- Mucherla Aruna (born 1965), Indian actress
- Poongothai Aladi Aruna (born 1964), Indian politician
- Quadri Aruna (born 1988), Nigerian table tennis player
- Sanghapali Aruna (born 1979), Indian human rights activist
