= Arun, Badakhshan =

Arun Ārūn
- Location in Afghanistan
- Coordinates: 38°18′36″N 70°50′45″E
- Country: Afghanistan
- Province: Badakhshan Province
- District: Maimay
- Time zone: + 4.30

Arun is a village in Badakhshan Province in north-eastern Afghanistan.
