= Anura Wegodapola =

Sri Lankan cricketer (born 1981)

Anura Wegodapola (born Senevirathne Panditha Abeykoon Bandaranayaka Wasala Mudiyense Ralahamilage Anura Bandara Wegodapola on 23 March 1981) is a Sri Lankan cricketer. He is a left-handed batsman and right-arm off-break bowler who plays for the Sri Lanka Navy. He was born in Polgolla.

Wegodapola made his List A debut for the side during the 2009–10 season, against Seeduwa Raddoluwa. From the opening order, he scored 12 runs. He bowled 3 overs in the match, conceding 21 runs.
