= Lord of Arran =

Title in medieval Scotland

The Lord of Arran was a title for the lord of Arran, Scotland in High Medieval Scotland.

== Lords of Arran ==
- John de Menteith

== See also ==
- Hugh Bisset
- Earl of Arran (Scotland)
