= Arran (carpet) =

Type of Karabakh carpet

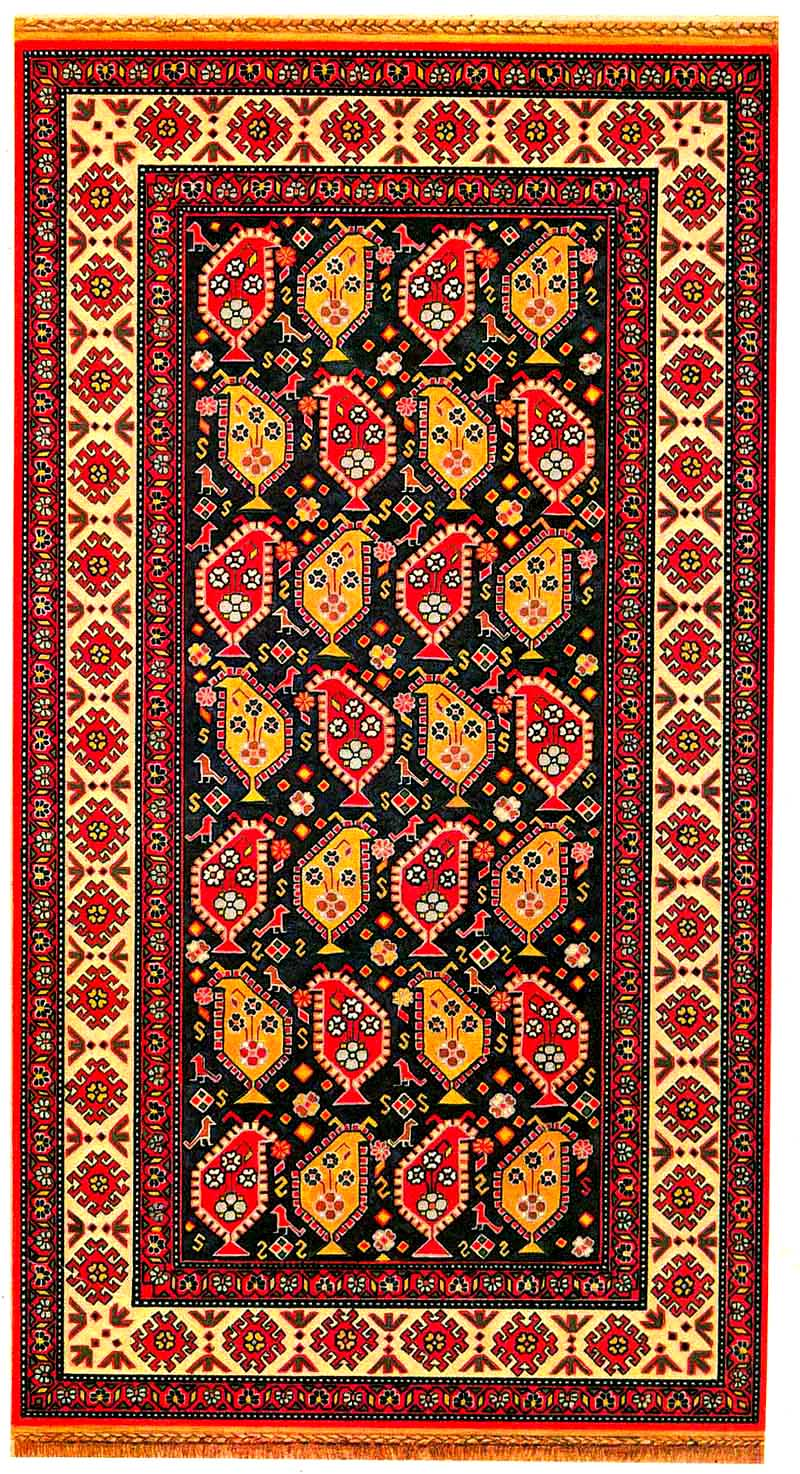
19th-century Arran rug

Arran carpets are a variety of carpets of the Karabakh carpet type.

== History ==
Barda was the center of Arran carpet production. From the second half of the 19th century, these carpets began to be produced in Jabrayil weaving factories under the name "Ərran", referring to the Ərran region. In the 9th-10th centuries Barda, was the center of this region. More recently, Arran carpets have been called "Jabrail" because they are widely produced in Jabrayil carpet weaving factories.

== Characteristics ==
The composition of the decorative pattern in the middle section of the Aran carpets consists of tasseled buta. These buta patterns - the main elements - are rarely but specifically placed in the middle field according to paisley-patterned carpets. Buta contains a description of birds and different shapes.

Arran carpets are woven in different formats. The density of knots is 4 knots per cm (160,000 knots per square meter), and the pile length is 7 mm.

== See also ==
- Azerbaijani rug
- Karabakh carpet
