= Aran, Tovuz =

Human settlement in Azerbaijan

Aran
- Location within Azerbaijan
- Coordinates: 40°58′8″N 45°45′5″E
- Country: Azerbaijan
- District: Tovuz
- Municipality: Yanıqlı

Population (2009)
  - Total: 534
- Time zone: UTC+4 (AZT)
  - Summer (DST): UTC+5 (AZT)

Aran is a village and municipality in the Tovuz District of Azerbaijan. As of the year 2009, It has a population of 534.

== Toponymy ==
The village is known as Aran Yanıqlı among the local population. In the past, this region was an area of arable lands under Yanıqlı. Following the Second World War, people who left Yanıqlı built a new settlement here.

== Demographics ==
Year	Total	Men	Women
1999	462	246	216
2009	534	284	250

== Healthcare ==
Aran Medical Center is located in the village.

== Notable people ==
- Vasif Heydərov, a lieutenant and a martyr of Second Nagorno-Karabakh War

== See also ==
- Administrative divisions of Azerbaijan
