= Aran, Lerik =

Aran
- Municipality
- Location within Azerbaijan
- Coordinates: 38°53′12″N 48°25′23″E
- Country: Azerbaijan
- Rayon: Lerik

Population
  - Total: 417
- Time zone: UTC+4 (AZT)
  - Summer (DST): UTC+5 (AZT)

Aran is a village and municipality in the Lerik Rayon of Azerbaijan. It has a population of 417. The municipality consists of the villages of Aran, Lələdulan, and Musavar.
