= Aran, Shaki =

Village in Shaki District, Azerbaijan

Aran
- Village
- Interactive map of Aran
- Coordinates: 40°55′46.69″N 47°9′18.87″E
- Country: Azerbaijan
- District: Shaki

Population
  - Estimate: 467

Aran is a village and municipality in the Shaki Rayon of Azerbaijan. It has a population of 467.
