= Aruna Dhathathreyan =

Indian biophysicist

- Education: University of Madras

Aruna dhathathreyan is a Professor and Emeritus scientist at CSIR-Central Leather Research Institute, Chennai, India. Her fields of work and research include biophysics, biophysical chemistry, and surface sciences.

== Education ==
Dhathathreyan grew up and was schooled in New Delhi, India. Inspired by the science-fiction works of Jules Verne, she chose to pursue physics as her undergraduate field of study. With few options available to her in Delhi, Dhathathreyan moved to Chennai to study physics at Women's Christian College.

In 1974, Dhathathreyan completed her undergraduate education and pursued a postgraduate degree at Madras Christian College. Following this, she completed her PhD in 1984, from the Department of Crystallography and Biophysics at the University of Madras. Accepted by the Max Planck Institute in Germany, Dhathathreyan spent six years working on her post-doctoral fellowship.

== Career ==
Throughout her career, Dhathathreyan has worked under, and with, eminent scientists, including Dr. GN Ramachandran, and the last PhD student of Linus Pauling; she currently works at CSIR-CLRI's Advanced Materials Lab., where she has been working since July 2015. She is also an INSA DFG visiting professor at Max Planck Institute, Germany, and visiting faculty at Anna University-CSIR-CLRI, Chennai.

Her publications have been featured in various journals, and include papers and articles such as:

- Scientists - making sense and being sensitive (General article, 2003).
- Teaching and research programmes in science in Indian universities (General article, 2003).
- Protein microcapsules: Preparation and applications (Publication, 2014).
- Development of smart leathers: incorporating scent through infusion of encapsulated lemongrass oil. (Publication, 2015).
- Balancing soft elasticity and low surface polarity in films of charged BSA capsules at air/fluid interface (Publication, 2016).

Dhathathreyan has authored over 125 research papers and has two patents. She has research experience in areas such as bio-colloids, Langmuir and Langmuir-Blodgett films, and molecular organized assemblies of bio-membranes, liposomes, and proteasomes.

She recently retired as Head of Department at CLRI, but continues to work with and mentor several students.

== Awards and honours ==
Awards received by Dhathathreyan include the following:

- B.C. Deb Memorial Award for Physical Chemistry (1998).
- Raman Research Fellowship (1999).
- Stree Shakti Samman Award for Best Woman Scientist, Physical Sciences (2005).
- Best Woman Biophysicist, Mother Teresa Women's University - Silver Jubilee Year Award (2009).
- INSA DFG Visiting Fellowship, Max Planck Institute for Colloids and Interface Research (2010).

In addition, Dhathathreyan was elected Fellow of the Madras Science Foundation in 2011, and was among 98 scientists featured in Leelavathi's Daughters, a compendium of female scientists in India created by the Indian Science Academy, Bengaluru (2008).

== Personal life ==
Dhathathreyan married a chemist who, at the time of their marriage, was a Humboldt Fellow in Germany. She has one child, a boy named Aditya, who is an entrepreneur in Chennai.

On her hobbies, Dhathathreyan says, "I think it’s important for scientists to be aware of trends in the world. They can’t lead isolated lives." She enjoys reading fiction, listening to a wide variety of music genres, and often discusses movies and actors with her students.
