= Left Recomposition =

- Founded: 2003
- Dissolved: 2024
- Merged into: Metavasi
- Headquarters: Stratigopoulou 7, Athens
- Newspaper: Ektos Grammis
- Youth wing: Left Recomposition Youth Sector
- Ideology: Communism; Anti-capitalism; Maoism
- Political position: Far-left
- National affiliation: Popular Unity (2015–2020)
- International affiliation: none

Website
- anasynthesi.gr

Left Recomposition (Greek: Αριστερή Ανασύνθεση, romanized: Aristeri Anasynthesi, ΑΡΑΝ; ARAN) was a Greek political organisation of the anti-capitalist left, formed in 2003. In May 2024, ARAN ceased to exist as an independent organisation upon participating in the formation of Metavasi (Greek: Μετάβαση).

== History ==
Left Recomposition was founded in 2003 as the merger of Aristeres Syspeiroseis (Left-Wing Groups) and Aristeri Kinisi (Left Movement).

== See also ==
- Politics of Greece
- List of political parties in Greece
