= Aran, Aghjabadi =

Aran
- Location within Azerbaijan
- Coordinates: 39°55′18″N 47°25′52″E
- Country: Azerbaijan
- Rayon: Aghjabadi
- Time zone: UTC+4 (AZT)
  - Summer (DST): UTC+5 (AZT)

Aran (known as Kuybishev until 1999) is a village and municipality in the Aghjabadi Rayon of Azerbaijan. It has a population of 1,655.

== History ==
The village used to be named Kuybışev (English transliteration: Kuybishev) in honor of Valerian Kuybyshev, a Bolshevik revolutionary and Soviet politician. On 1999-10-05, it was renamed Aran.
