= Anura C. Perera =

Sri Lankan science writer and astronomer (born 1947)

- Born: June 18, 1947 (age 77); Colombo Sri Lanka
- Other names: Anura Chandra Perera
- Education: Nalanda College, Colombo
- Occupations: Author; publisher
- Known for: Author, astronomer

Anura C. Perera (born 18 June 1947) is a Sri Lankan science writer and astronomer. He resides in the United States.

== Early life ==
Perera was born in Colombo to parents Aleck Fedrick Perera and Dona Charlet Benaragama. He was educated at Nalanda College, Colombo. He has an elder sister Indrani and younger brother Suraj.

== Career ==
He was deputy editor of Sri Lanka's first science magazine, Vidumina. In 1971 he was awarded the Science award for his book Sun & Planets.
