= Catacol =

Coordinates: 55.695°N 5.326°W

Catacol: Scottish Gaelic: Catagal
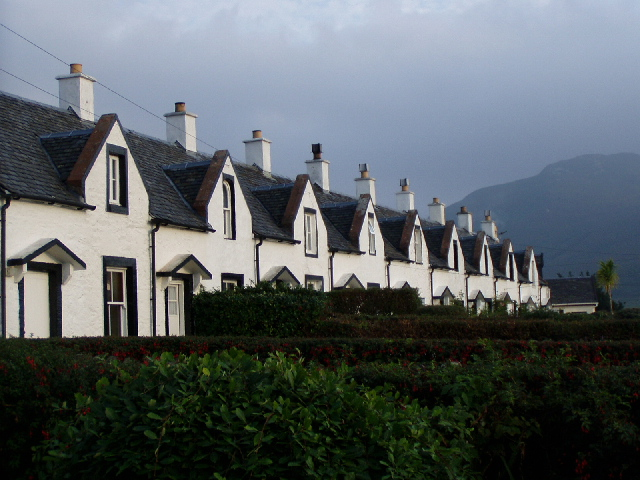
- The Twelve Apostles at Catacol Bay

- Location within North Ayrshire
- OS grid reference: NR909496
- Civil parish: Kilmory
- Council area: North Ayrshire
- Lieutenancy area: Ayrshire and Arran
- Country: Scotland
- Sovereign state: United Kingdom
- Post town: ISLE OF ARRAN
- Postcode district: KA27
- Dialling code: 01770
- Police: Scotland
- Fire: Scottish
- Ambulance: Scottish
- UK Parliament: North Ayrshire and Arran
- Scottish Parliament: Cunninghame North

Catacol (Scottish Gaelic: Catagal) is a small village on the Isle of Arran, in the council area of North Ayrshire, Scotland.

== Geography ==
Catacol is located on the north west side of the island, just a few miles along the coastal road from Lochranza that continues on to Blackwaterfoot. It derives its name from Old Norse, referring to the 'gully of the cat', referring to the wildcats that may have roamed here. It is situated at the foot of Glen Catacol, a steep-sided valley down which the Abhainn Mor flows, where the river is crossed by a bridge just inland from the banks of shingle on the beach beside Catacol Bay.

== Landmarks ==
Catacol's main feature is the row of cottages called the 'Twelve Apostles', which were completed around the middle of the 1860s. They were built to house those people cleared from the surrounding countryside, when much of the interior of the island was set aside for deer, the hunting of which had become fashionable among the landed gentry. The theory was these former farmers evicted from the land would turn to fishing, and with this in mind, each of the twelve cottages had a differently shaped first floor window. This would allow the woman of the house to signal by placing a candle in the window to her husband while he was out fishing on the Firth of Clyde. The husband would know who was being signalled by the shape of the window in which the candle was lit. In reality, most of the dispossessed crofters moved away to other parts of the island in protest against their eviction, and the houses remained empty for two years, during which time they were known as "hungry row".

The village formerly housed a hotel, the Catacol Bay Hotel, know by locals as 'the cat', permanently closed in September 2018 due to the owner retiring. The surrounding area has grassy hills, moorland and patches of woodland in the steep-sided gullies. The Isle of Arran is the only place in which the Catacol whitebeam (Sorbus pseudomeinichii) is to be found. This is an extremely rare tree endemic to the area, thought to be a hybrid of the native rowan (Sorbus aucuparia) and the cut-leaved whitebeam (Sorbus pseudofennica), of which there may be only one or two surviving specimens.

There is also a small jetty that is no longer used, an old anchor embedded into the grass and an old boat winch.
