= Aran Fox =

- Born: 23 December 1988 (age 36); Altrincham, England
- Height: 5 ft 11 in (180 cm)
- Weight: 147 lb (67 kg; 10 st 7 lb)
- Position: Goaltender
- Catches: Left
- EIHL team Former teams: Unattached; Manchester Phoenix
- Playing career: 2007–present

Aran Fox (born 23 December 1988) is an English professional ice hockey goaltender, currently without a club after leaving for personal reasons the Manchester Phoenix of the EIHL. He had been the first player to rise up through the junior ranks of the Phoenix organisation to the EIHL squad.

Fox did not manage to start a game for the Phoenix however, and was used as the back-up goaltender behind the ex-Atlanta Thrashers player Scott Fankhouser. Fox left the Phoenix EIHL team midway through the 2007/08 season.
