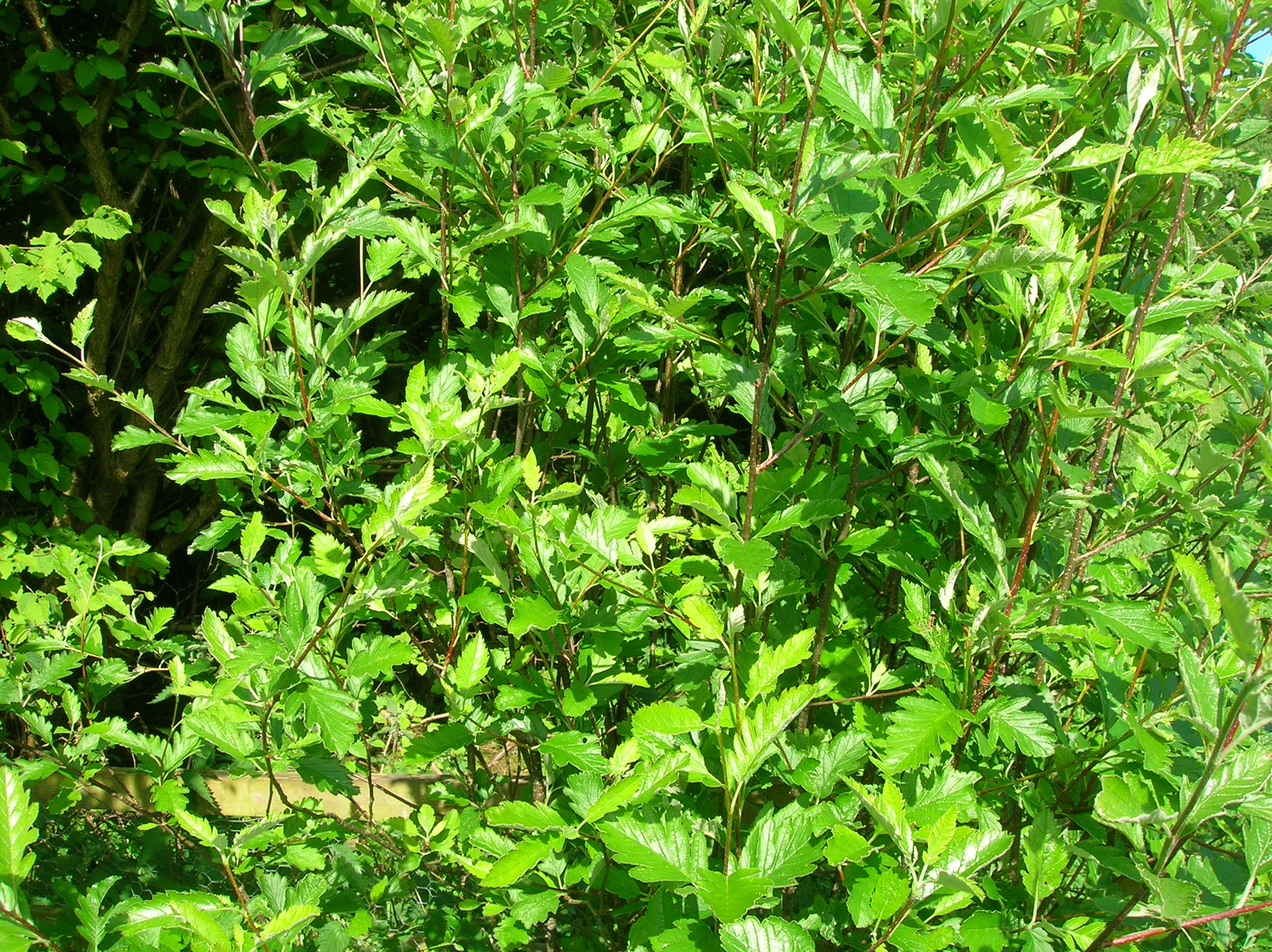

Conservation status
- Critically Endangered (IUCN 3.1)

Scientific classification
- Kingdom: Plantae
- Clade: Tracheophytes
- Clade: Angiosperms
- Clade: Eudicots
- Clade: Rosids
- Order: Rosales
- Family: Rosaceae
- Genus: Hedlundia
- Species: H. pseudofennica

Binomial name
- Hedlundia pseudofennica (E.F.Warb.) Sennikov & Kurtto

Synonyms
- Pyrus pseudofennica (E.F.Warb.) M.F.Fay & Christenh.; Sorbus pseudofennica E.F.Warb.; Sorbus hybrida Syme

= Hedlundia pseudofennica =

Species of plant

Hedlundia pseudofennica, also called Arran service-tree or Arran cut-leaved whitebeam, is a species of plant in the family Rosaceae. Endemic to the Isle of Arran in Scotland, it is threatened by habitat loss. It is thought to be a naturally occurring hybrid between H. arranensis and Sorbus aucuparia, probably with additional backcrossing with S. aucuparia. Hedlundia arranensis is itself a hybrid between Aria rupicola and S. aucuparia. Apomixis and hybridization are common in some groups of Sorbus species.

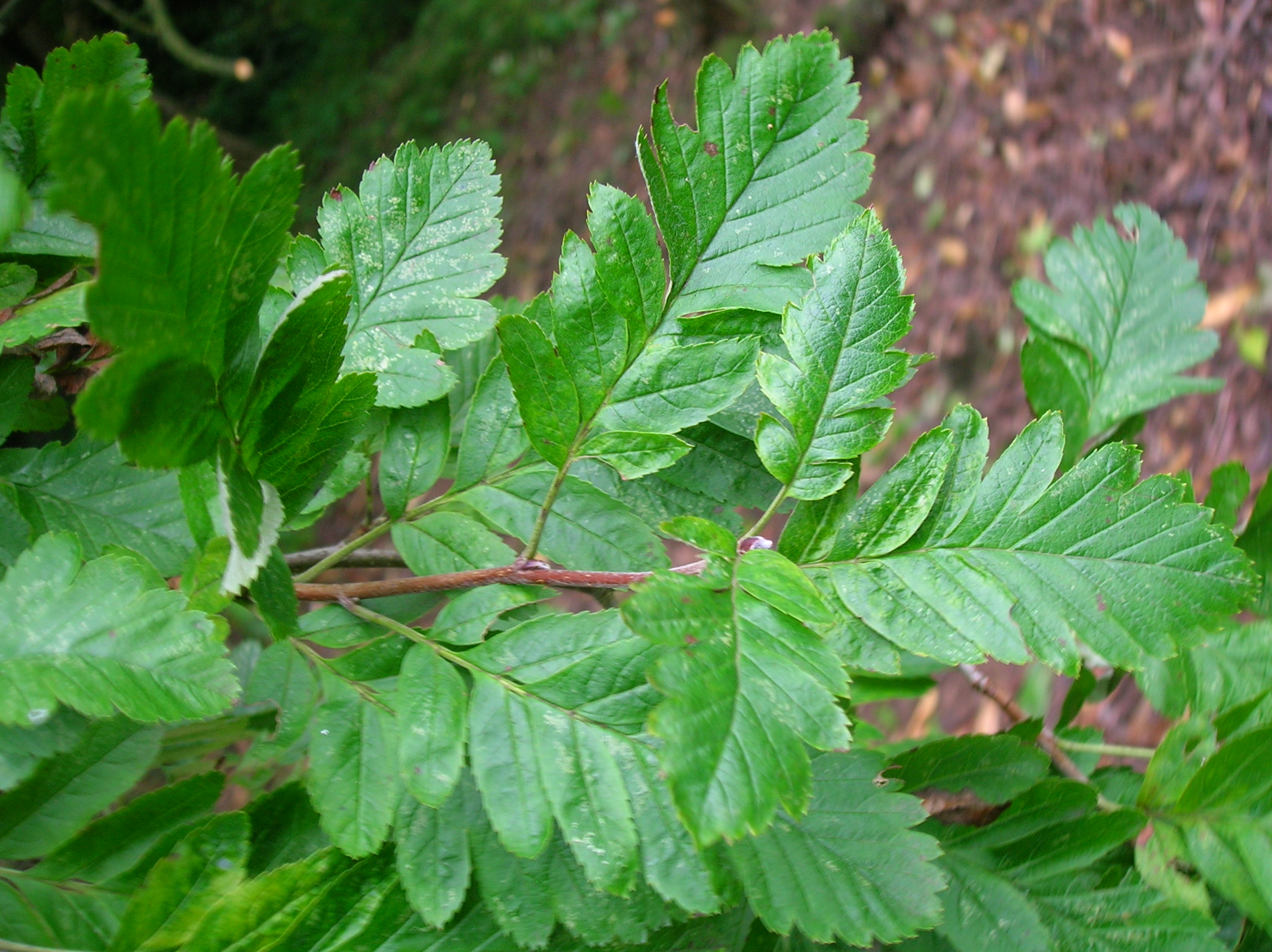
Detail of S. pseudofennica leaves.

== See also ==
- Arran whitebeams
- Spier's School - a mature example grows here.
