= Arūnas Eigirdas =

Lithuanian politician (born 1953)

Arūnas Eigirdas (born 11 June 1953) is a Lithuanian politician and former member of the Seimas.

== Biography ==
Eigirdas was born in Klaipėda, Lithuania, on 11 June 1953.

Eigirdas was a member of the Communist Party of Lithuania until 1989. In the first parliamentary elections after the independence, Eigirdas was elected as the member of the Sixth Seimas through the electoral list of Sąjūdis (LPS).

On 14 April 1993 the Central Electoral Commission declared the previously announced results in three electoral districts invalid, citing the decisions of the Supreme Court of Lithuania. Stasys Malkevičius and Algirdas Endriukaitis, both ranked higher than Eigirdas on the electoral list of LPS, lost their single-seat constituencies, but retained their seats in the parliament through the electoral list. As a result, Eigirdas (and another Seimas member elected through the same list, Juozas Janonis) lost their seats.

Since 1993 Eigirdas was a member of the Homeland Union, which had emerged from LPS, leaving in 2012. In 2013 he joined the Lithuanian Nationalist Union and unsuccessfully ran in the municipal elections in 2015.
