= Ramayana Centre =

The Ramayana Centre is cultural and spiritual organization based in Union Park, Mauritius. It was founded in 2001 by an act passed in the National Assembly of the Republic of Mauritius to promote and propagate the Hindu epic Ramayana and the spiritual, social and cultural values flowing therefrom. Prior to this, no parliament of any country had enacted a Bill or set up an institution for the dissemination of the perennial values of the Ramayana.

The Bill was unanimously approved on May 22, 2001, and was proclaimed as an Act by the President of the Republic on June 14, 2001. It was published in the Government Gazette No. 64 on June 30, 2001.

The president of the Ramayana Centre is Pandit Rajendra Arun, scholar of the Ramayana and author of several books on various characters of the Ramayana. In 2002, on Tulsi Jayanti day, the foundation stone of the Ramayana Center laid by Prime Minister, Anerood Jugnauth. Subsequently, the building of formally inaugurated in 2007 by the then Prime Minister Dr. Navinchandra Ramgoolam.
