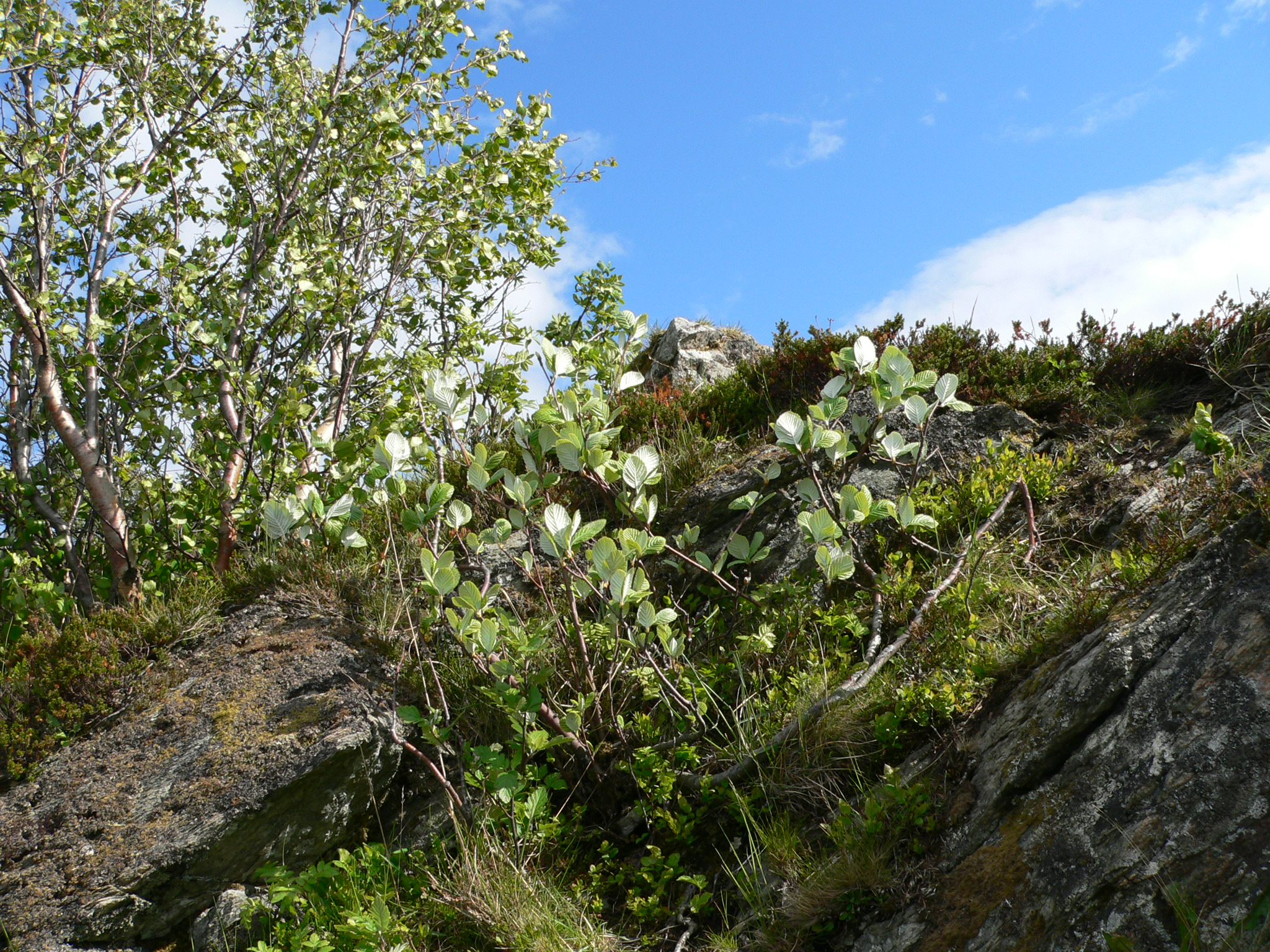
- Rock whitebeam at the Trondheimsfjord, Norway

Conservation status
- Least Concern (IUCN 3.1)

Scientific classification
- Kingdom: Plantae
- Clade: Embryophytes
- Clade: Tracheophytes
- Clade: Spermatophytes
- Clade: Angiosperms
- Clade: Eudicots
- Clade: Rosids
- Order: Rosales
- Family: Rosaceae
- Genus: Aria
- Species: A. rupicola

Binomial name
- Aria rupicola (Syme) Mezhenskyj

Synonyms
- List: Pyrus aria subsp. rupicola Syme; Pyrus rupicola (Syme) Bab.; Sorbus rupicola (Syme) Hedl.; Sorbus scandica subsp. rupicola (Syme) Nyman; Pyrus aria proles salicifolia (Myrin) Asch. & Graebn.; Sorbus aria var. salicifolia Myrin; Sorbus aria subsp. salicifolia (Myrin) Hedl.; Sorbus salicifolia (Myrin) Prain

= Aria rupicola =

Species of shrub

Aria rupicola, commonly known as rock whitebeam, is a rare species of shrub or small tree best known from the British Isles but also reported from Norway, Sweden, and the Baltic States.

Reaching heights of 10 m, it grows in rocky woodland, scrub and cliffs, usually on limestone.

The species reproduces apomictically (asexually via cloned seeds) and was presumably created by autopolyploidysation of the common whitebeam proper (Sorbus aria s.str.). It contains a tetraploidal set of chromosomes (2n=4x=68).

Stace gives Aria rupicola the following characteristics:

- Leaves unlobed or lobed ≤1/20 of the way to the midrib.
- Leaves with a single style of teeth or, weakly, two styles of teeth.
- Leaves with 6 to 9 (rarely 4 to 10) pairs of lateral veins.
- Leaves mostly 1.6 to 2.4 times longer than wide.
- Leaves mostly widest in that half of the leaf furthest from the stalk.
- Leaves usually obtuse (rarely acute) at apex.
- Leaves have dense white hairs on lower surface.
- Fruits 10-15mm across, warty.
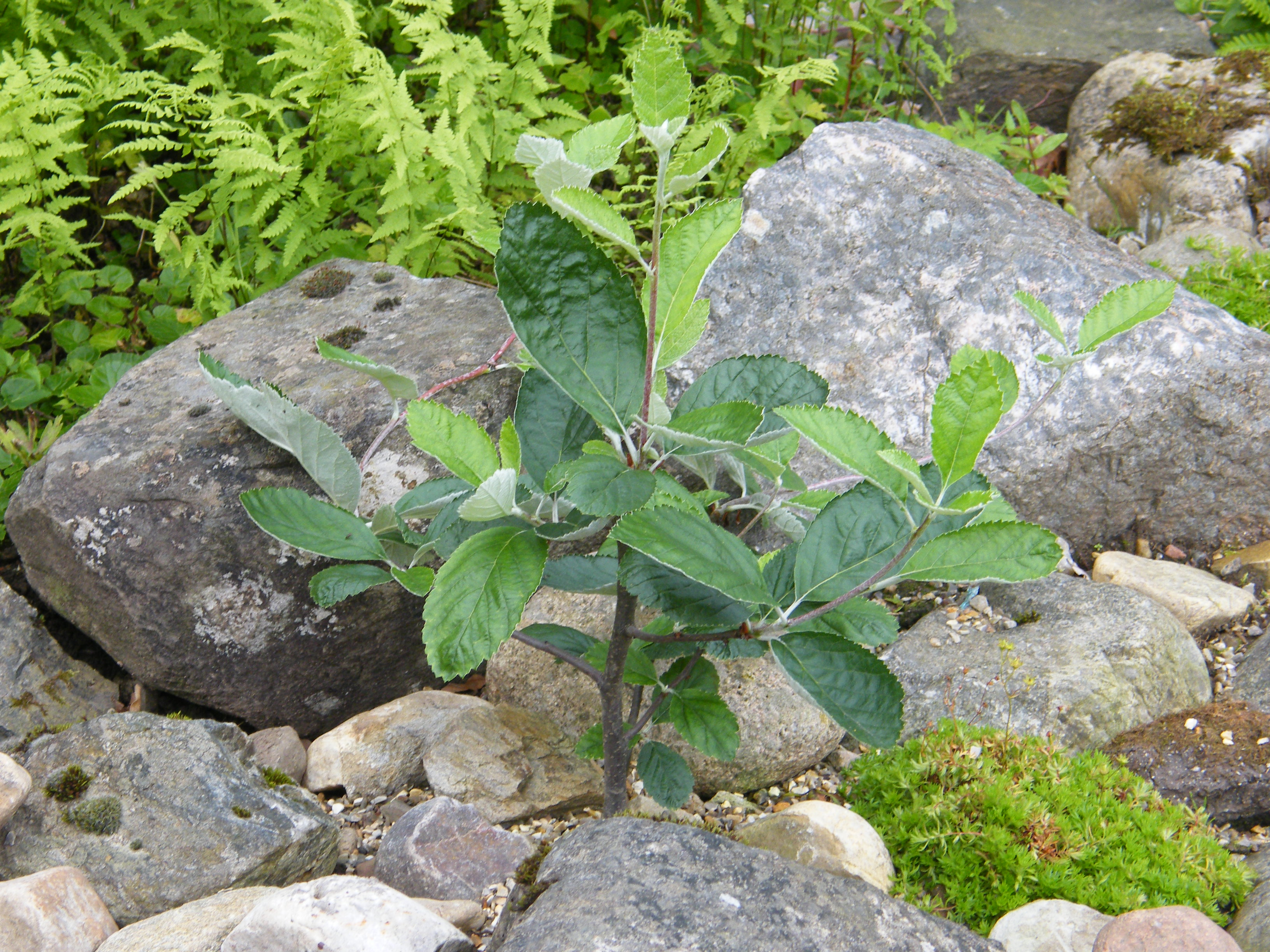
A young specimen

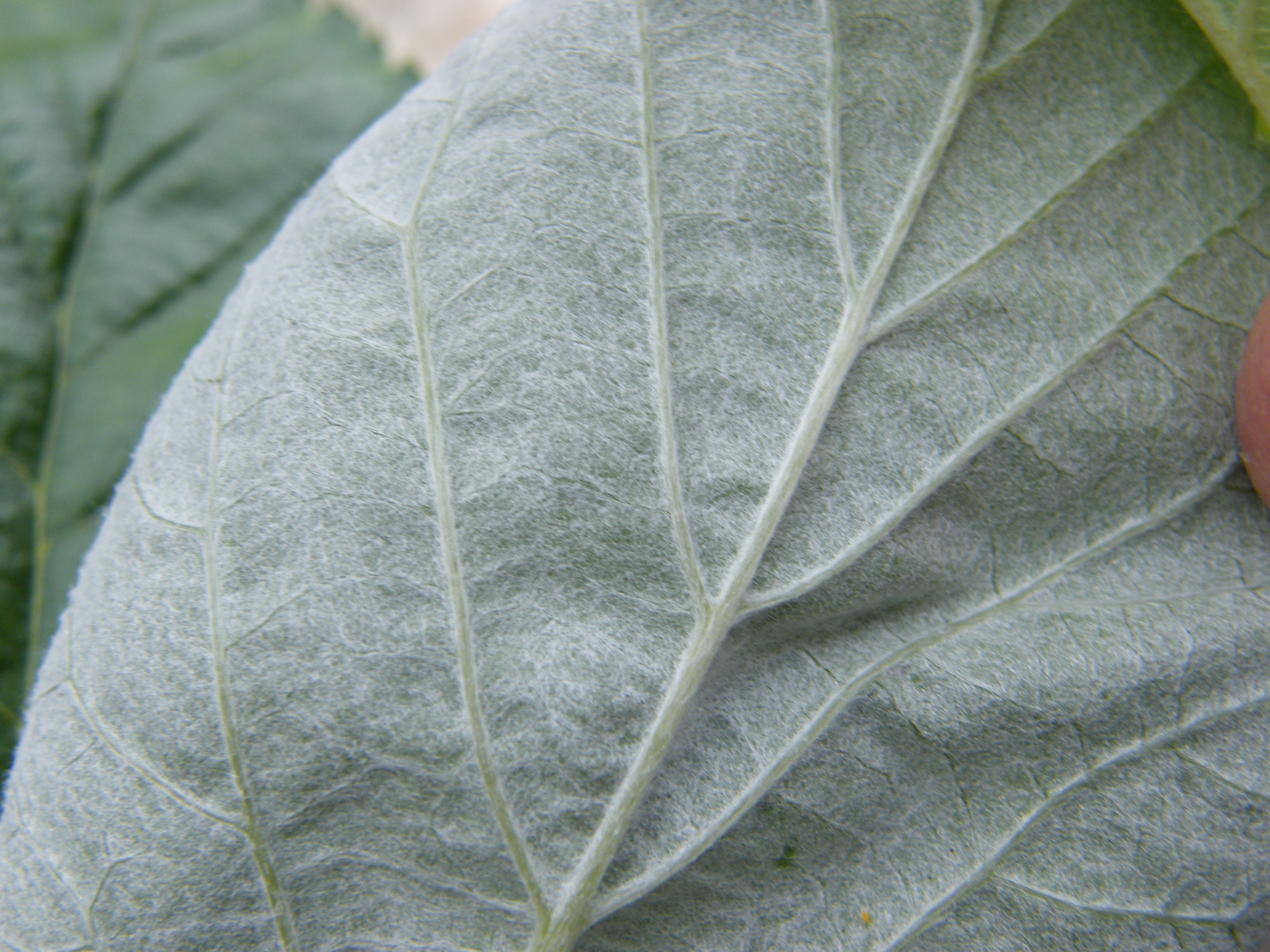
Back of a leaf

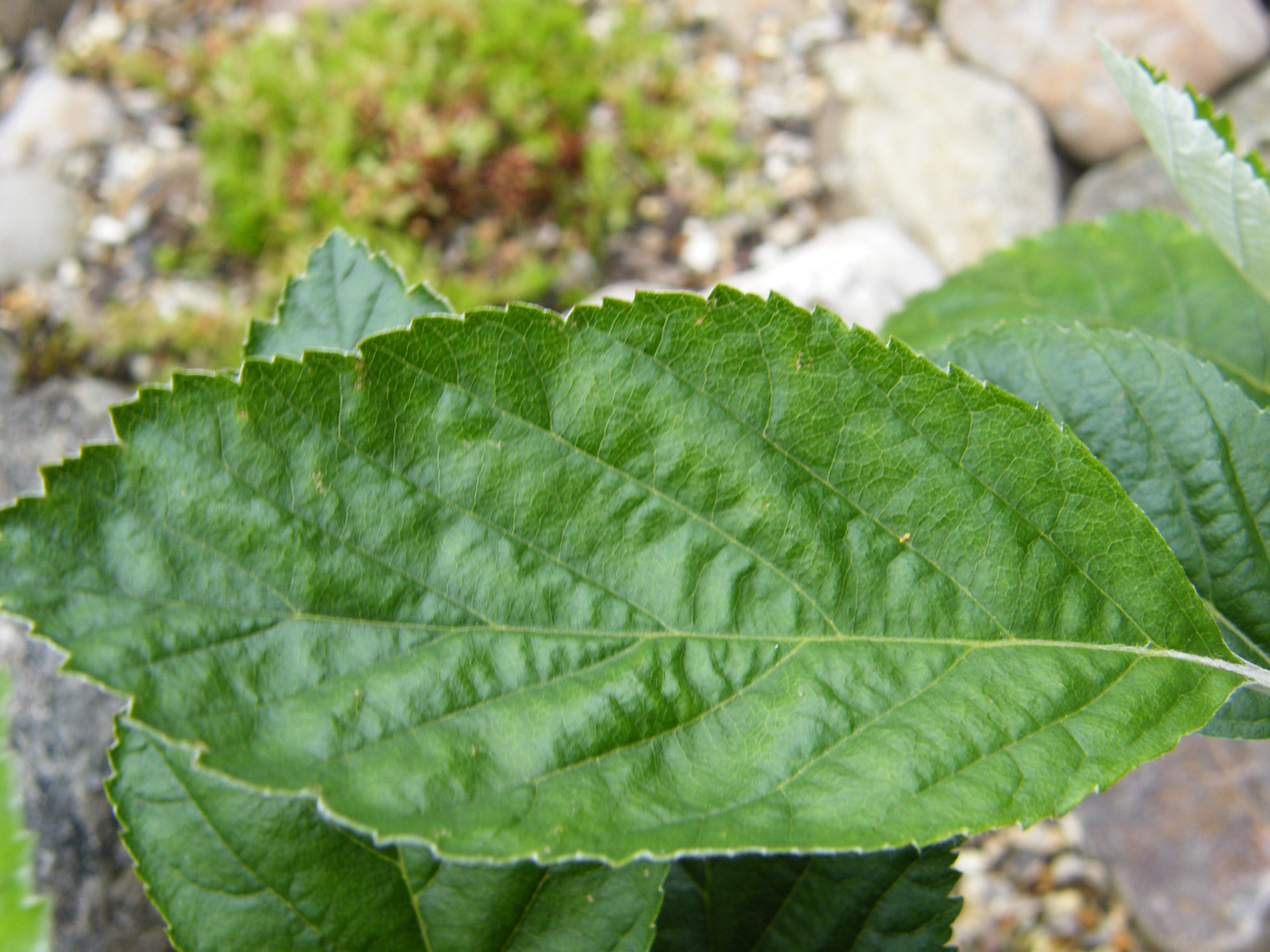
Upper surface of a leaf

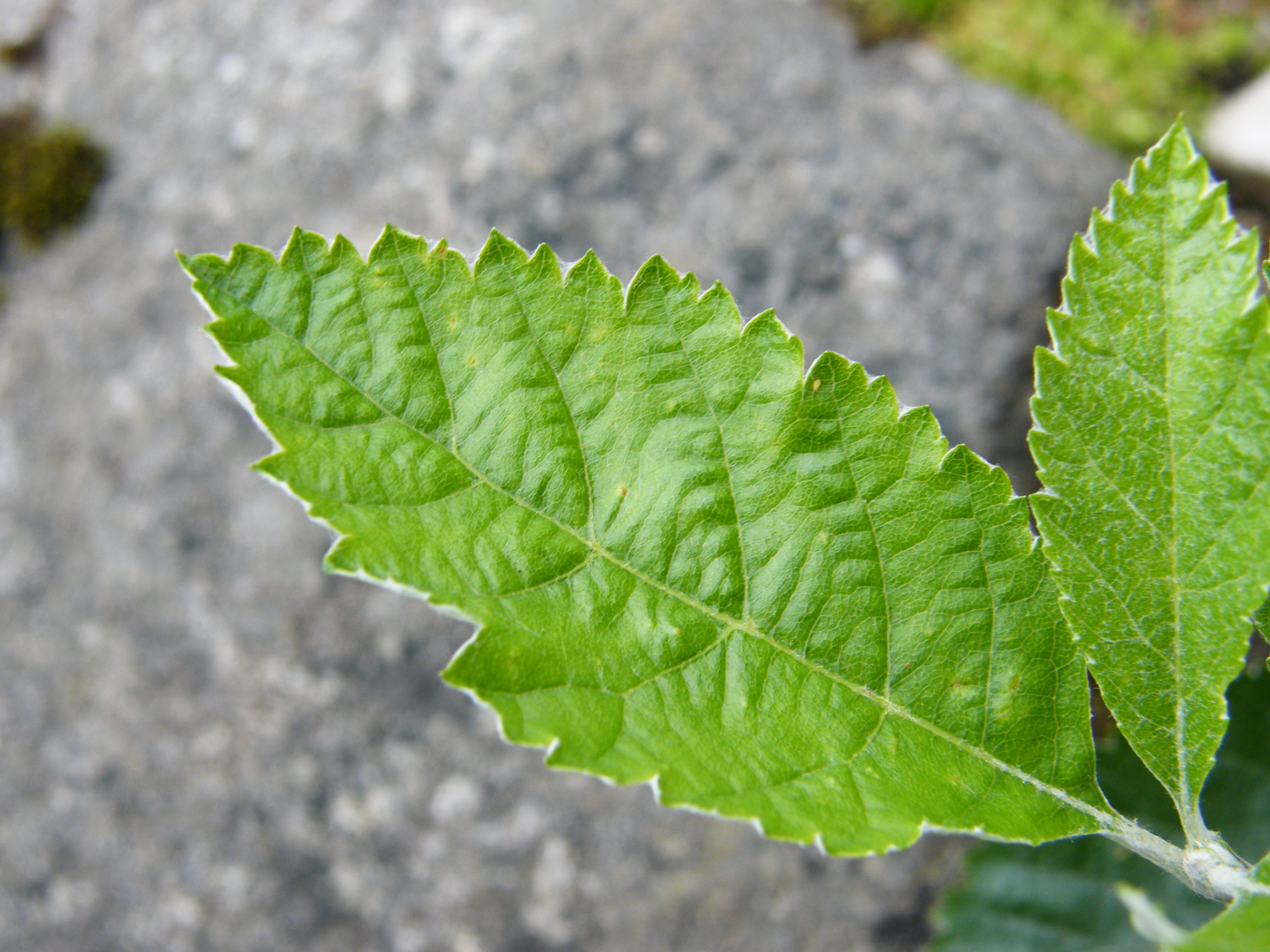
Upper surface of a leaf

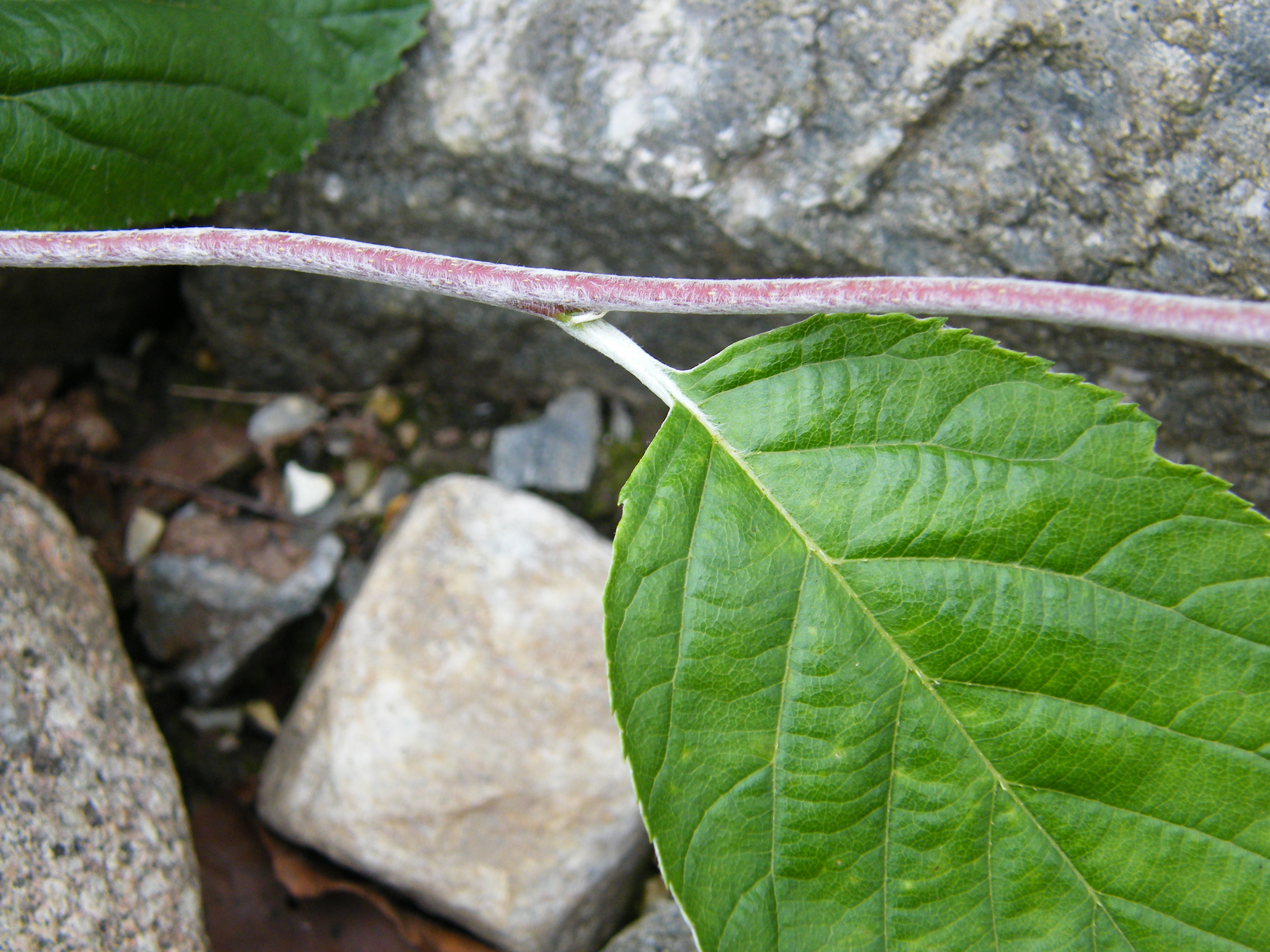
Twig and part of a leaf
