= Giants' Graves, Arran =

Giants' Graves
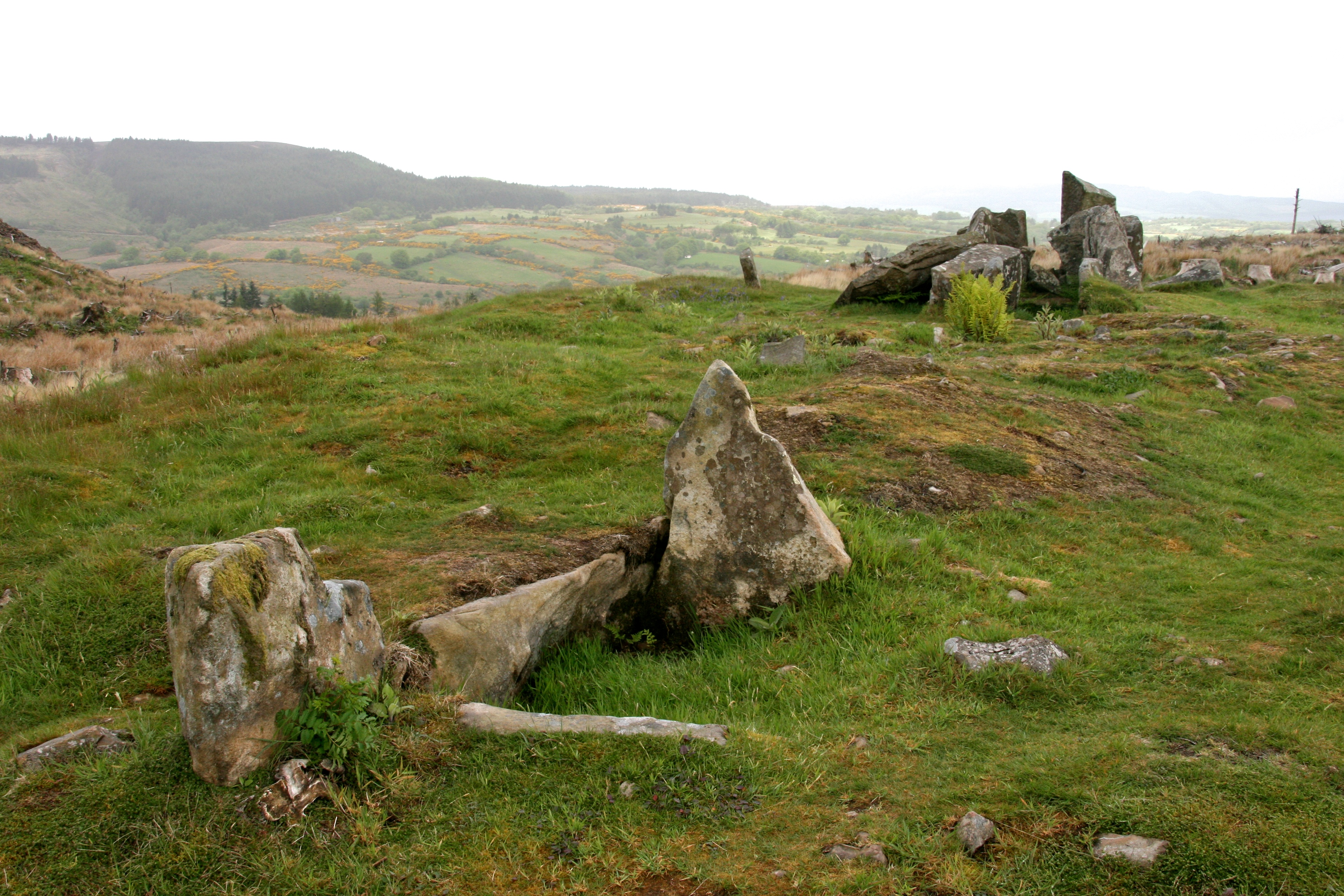

- Shown within the Isle of Arran, Scotland
- 55°28′35″N 5°05′50″W
- Type: Chambered burial tomb
- Periods: Neolithic
- Location: Isle of Arran

Site notes
- Public access: Yes

The Giants' Graves are the remains of two Neolithic chambered tombs on the Isle of Arran in Scotland. They are situated within 40 metres of each other, and stand on a ridge 120 metres above the sea in a clearing in a forest, overlooking Whiting Bay to the south.

== Giant's Grave North ==
This cairn (grid reference NS04302467) has been much robbed, but the edges are still well-defined. The main axis of the cairn is north–south, the north end being wider with a concave facade. The chamber is 6 metres long, and around 1 metre wide. It was excavated in 1902, and among the artifacts recovered were pottery shards, flint knives, and leaf-shaped arrowheads.

== Giant's Grave South ==
This cairn (grid reference NS04312463) is at right angles to the larger northern cairn. The main axis is east–west, and the entrance was at the west end. The chamber is about 4 metres long, and over 1 metre wide. Excavations in 1902 only revealed soil and stones, however in 1961-2 further exploration produced nine sherds of a round-based vessel, and fragments of burnt bone.
