= Lochranza Castle =

Castle in Lochranza, Scotland

Coordinates: 55.7053°N 5.2903°W

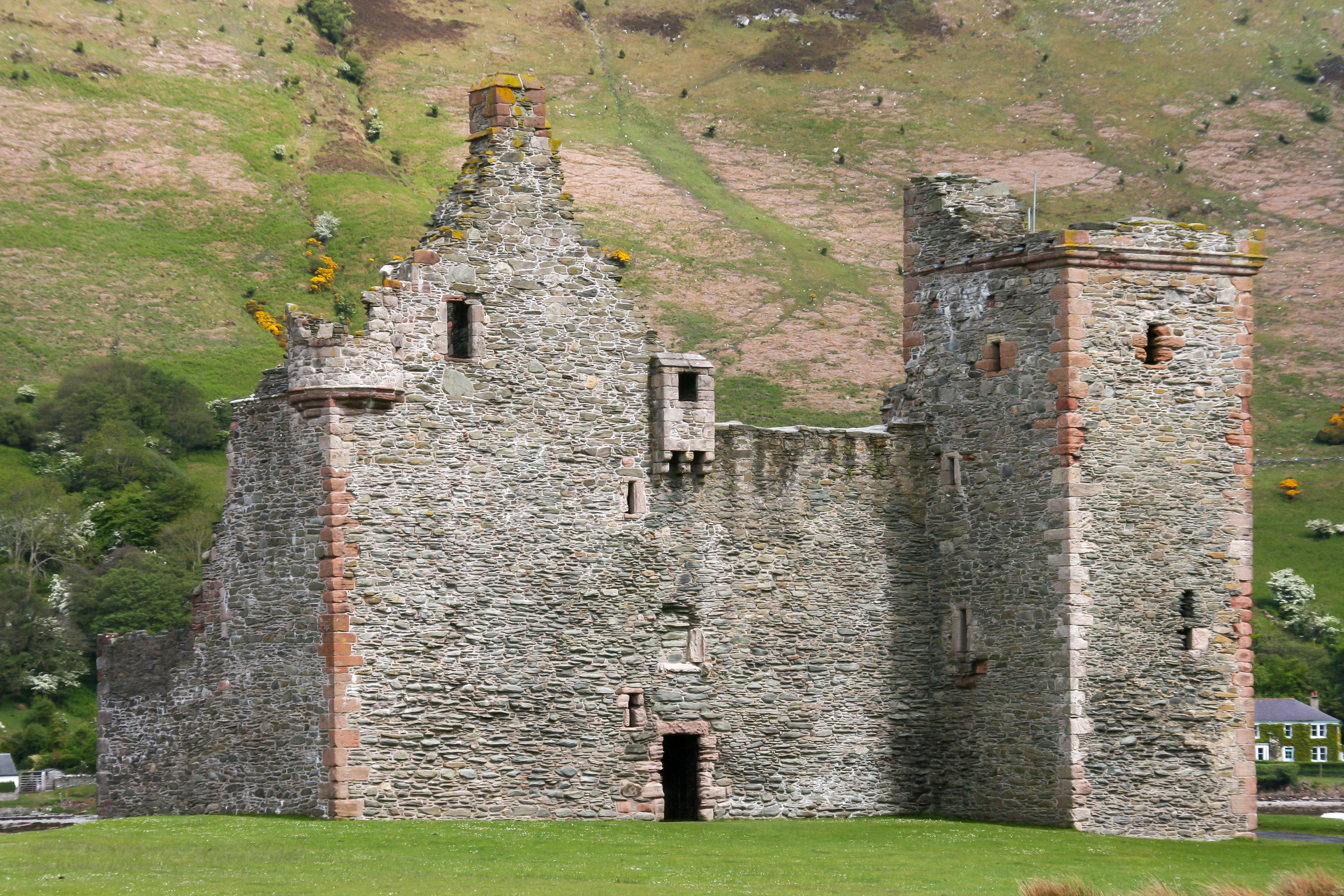
Lochranza Castle (May 2011)

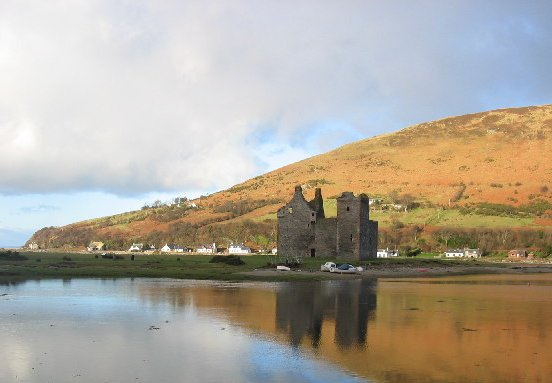
Lochranza Castle (February 2004)

Lochranza Castle is an L-plan fortified tower house situated on a promontory in Lochranza, on the northern part of the Isle of Arran in Scotland. Most of the current structure was built in the 16th century.

== History ==
The castle dates from the 13th century when it was owned by the MacSweens. In 1262, King Alexander III granted the castle and its lands to Walter Stewart, the Earl of Menteith. It is believed that Robert the Bruce landed at Lochranza in 1306 on his return from Ireland to claim the Scottish throne. By 1371, the castle was the property of Robert II. It is thought that at this time it was used as a royal hunting lodge.

During the 1490s, James IV used the castle in his campaign against the Lord of the Isles and the Clan MacDonald.

In 1600 Robert Montgomerie of Skelmorlie recovered the castle for the Marquess of Hamilton from Alastair Mc Alastair and his followers.

In 1614 it was occupied by the king and in the 1650s it was used by Oliver Cromwell.

By 1705, Lochranza Castle was the property of the Hamilton family, after it was purchased by the Duchess of Hamilton. The Hamiltons had owned other estates on the Isle of Arran so eventually sold it to the Blackwood-Davidson family who used it as their principal seat. During the 18th century, the castle fell into disuse and was abandoned. The castle is now in the care of Historic Scotland.

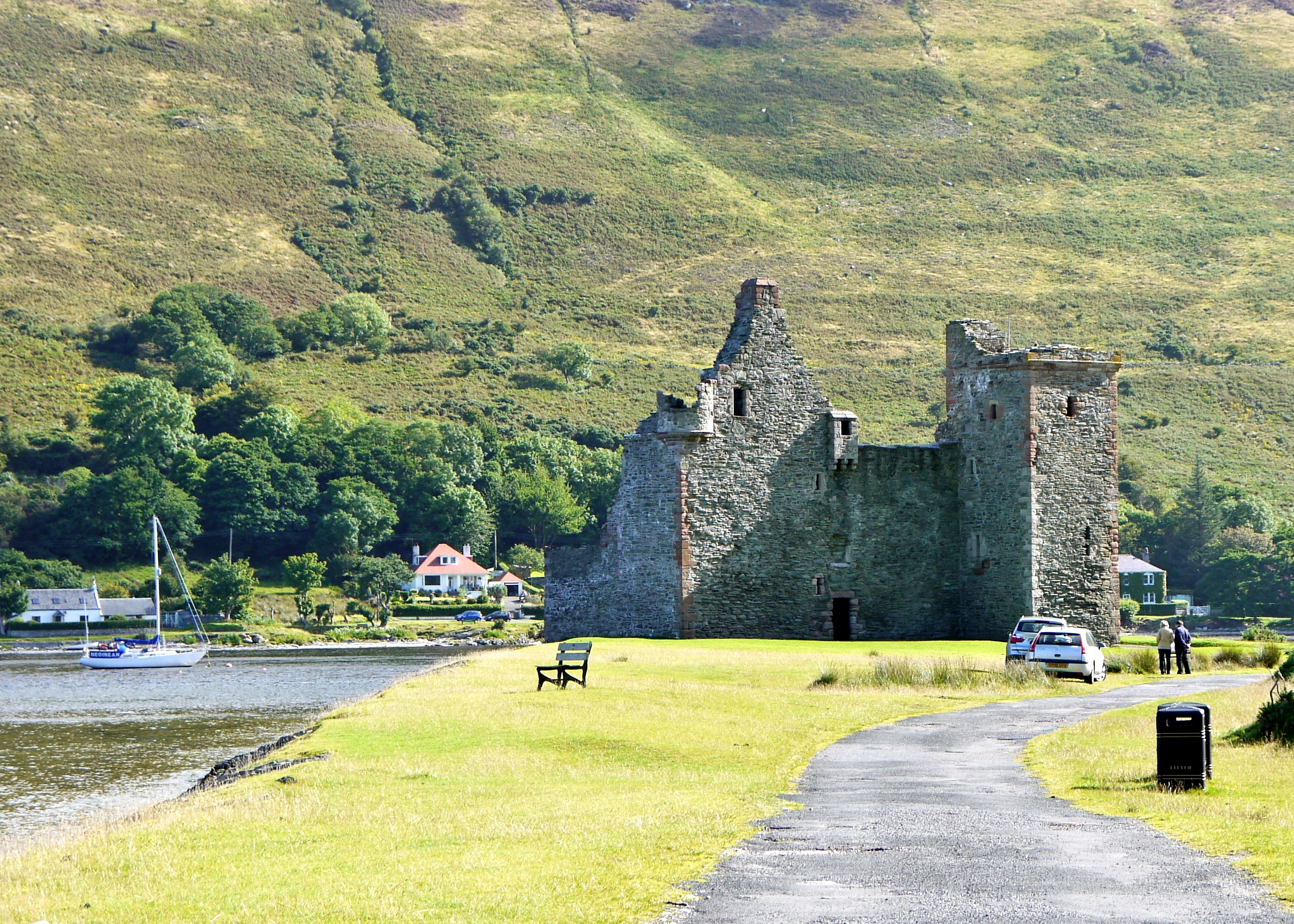
Lochranza Castle (August 2011)

== In popular culture ==
For the album The Black Island in The Adventures of Tintin, Methuen Publishing, the English publisher, asked for more realism for the third edition of 1966. Bob de Moor, then Hergé's assistant, followed in Tintin's exact footsteps, drawing inspiration from different locations to produce a new set of background designs. He goes to the Isle of Arran. According to Charles Dierick, a member of Studios Hergé, it erroneously follows that Lochranza Castle is said to serve as a model. But this one has a square tower and its silhouette is not appropriate, whereas on this same island Bob de Moor reproduces certain details of Brodick Castle.

The castle appeared in "Dom Joly and the Black Island" on Channel 4 TV on 19 March 2010, in which it was portrayed as being Kisimul Castle on the Isle of Barra in the Outer Hebrides, as it appeared directly after Joly was shown attempting to reach Kisimul Castle.
