= Tighvein =

Hill in North Ayrshire, Scotland

Coordinates: 55°29′57″N 5°10′18″W

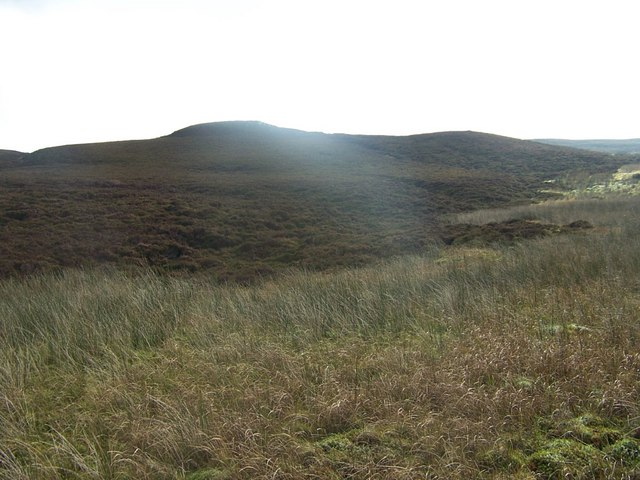
- Tighvein from the north

Highest point
- Elevation: 458 m (1,503 ft)
- Prominence: 181 m (594 ft)
- Parent peak: A' Chruach
- Listing: Marilyn

Naming
- English translation: Side mountain
- Language of name: Gaelic

Geography
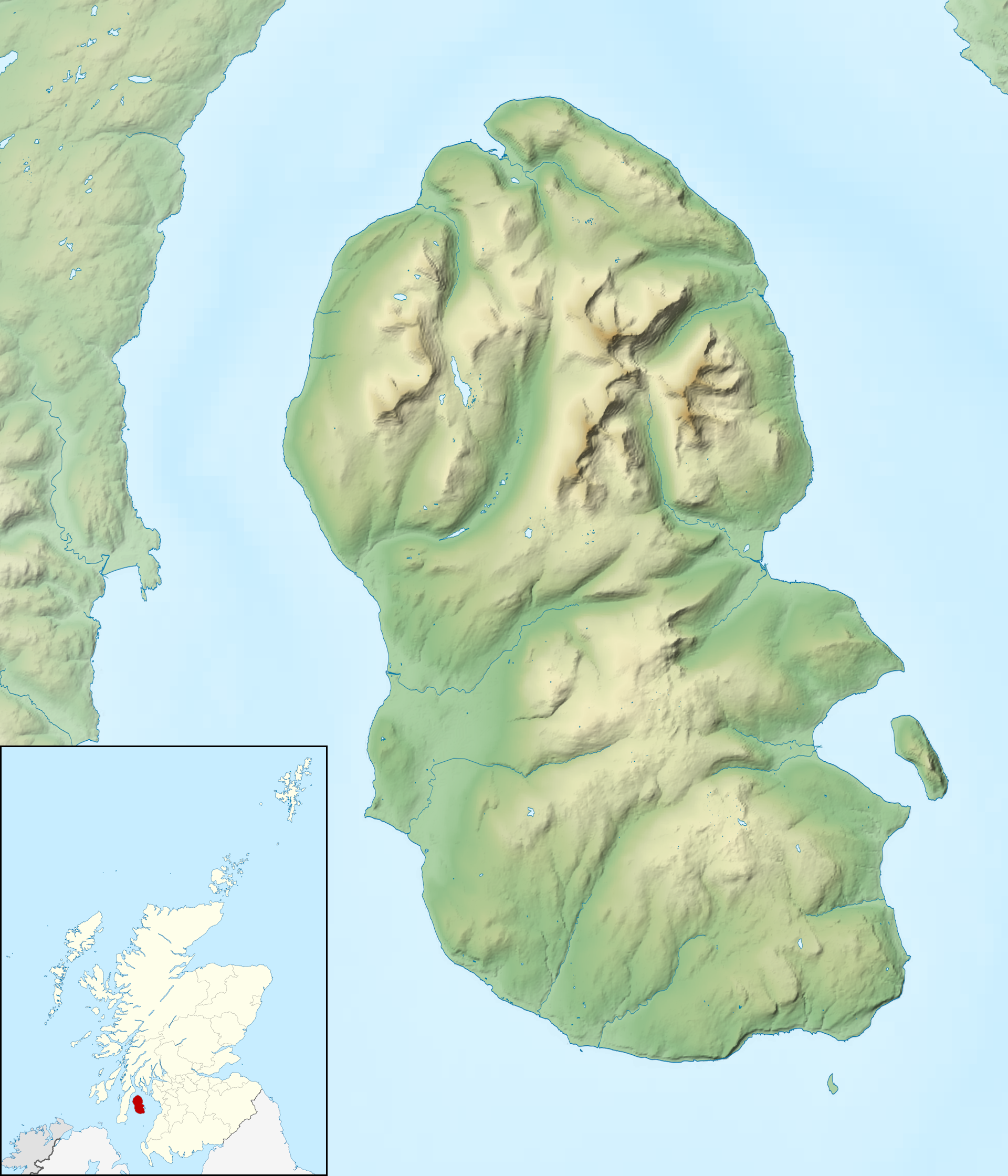
- Location within Arran
- Location: Isle of Arran, North Ayrshire, Scotland
- OS grid: NR997274
- Topo map: OS Landranger 69

Tighvein (Scottish Gaelic: Taobh Bheinn) is a hill above Lamlash on the Isle of Arran in western Scotland. It is a Marilyn (a hill with topographic prominence of at least 150m) and the highest point on the south-eastern section of the island, south-east of the pass of Monamore Glen. Two miles from the nearest road, the top is a heathery, boggy moor, almost entirely ringed by thick forestry plantations. It is rarely climbed as there are no paths to the top.
