= Isle of Arran =

Island off the coast of Scotland

Eilean Arainn (Gaelic)
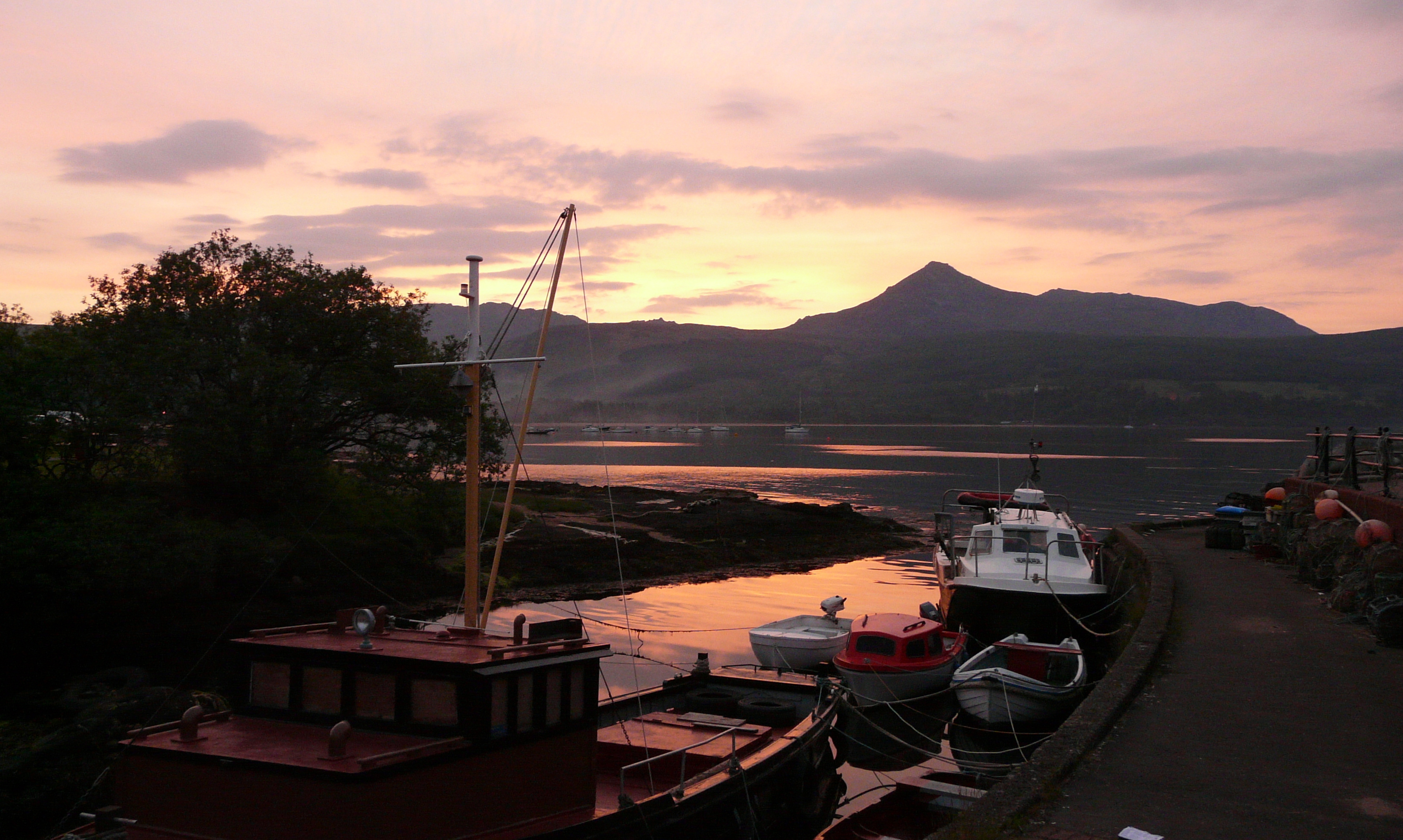
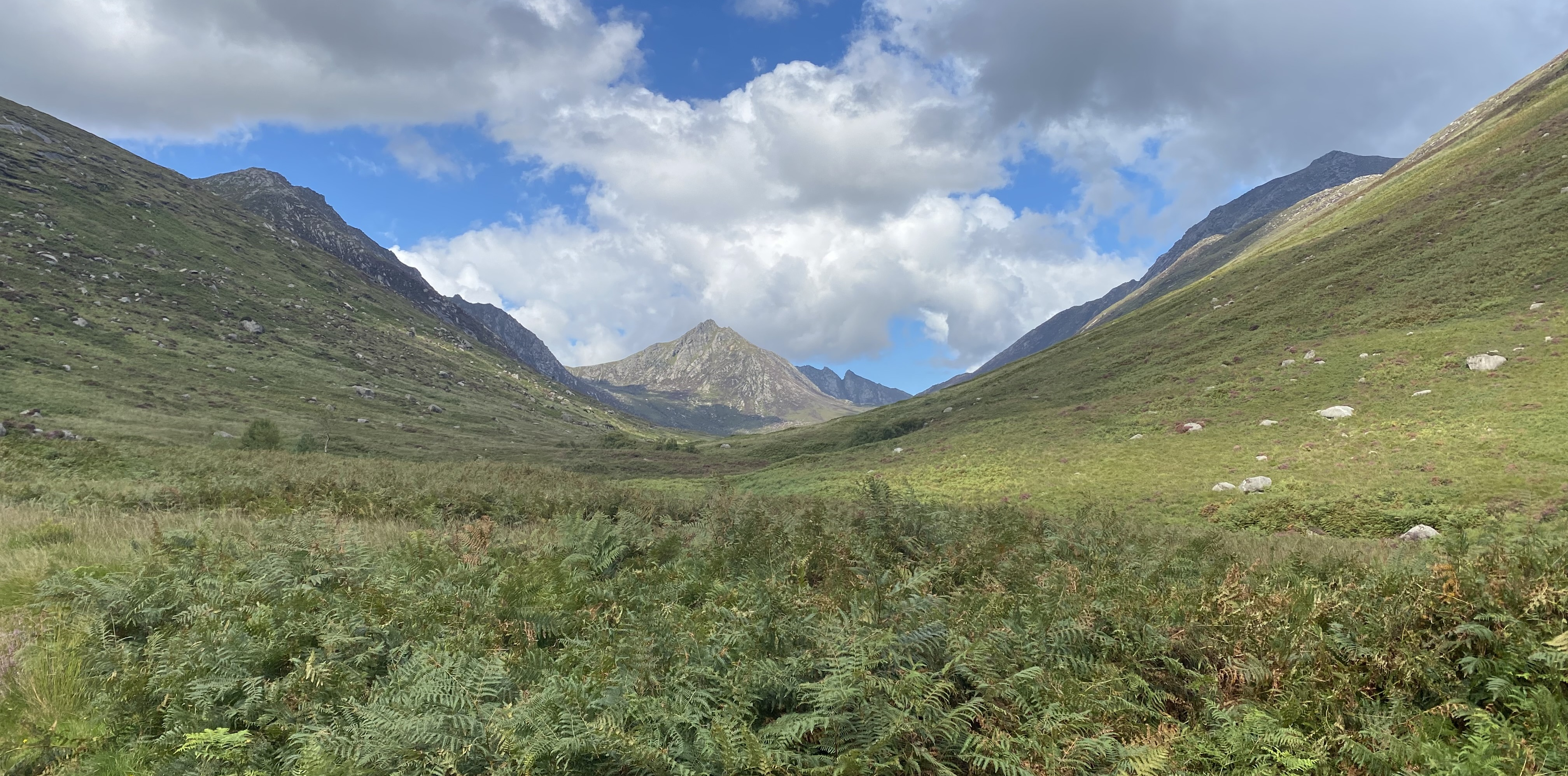
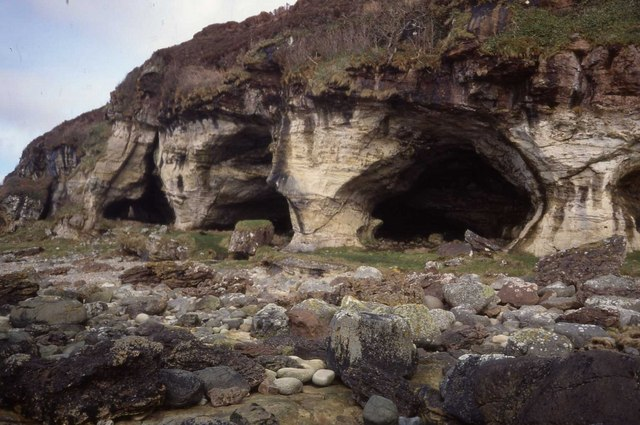
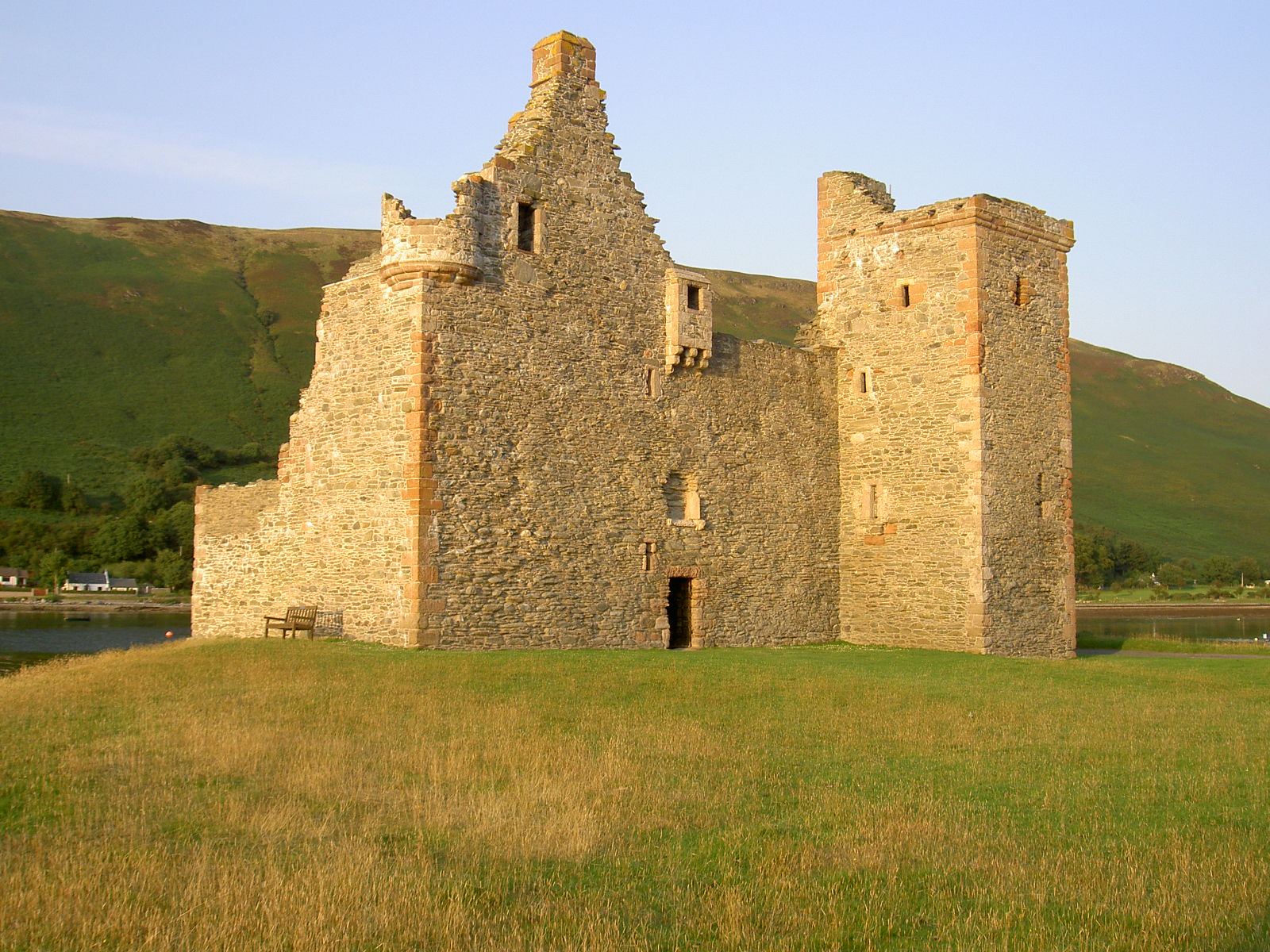
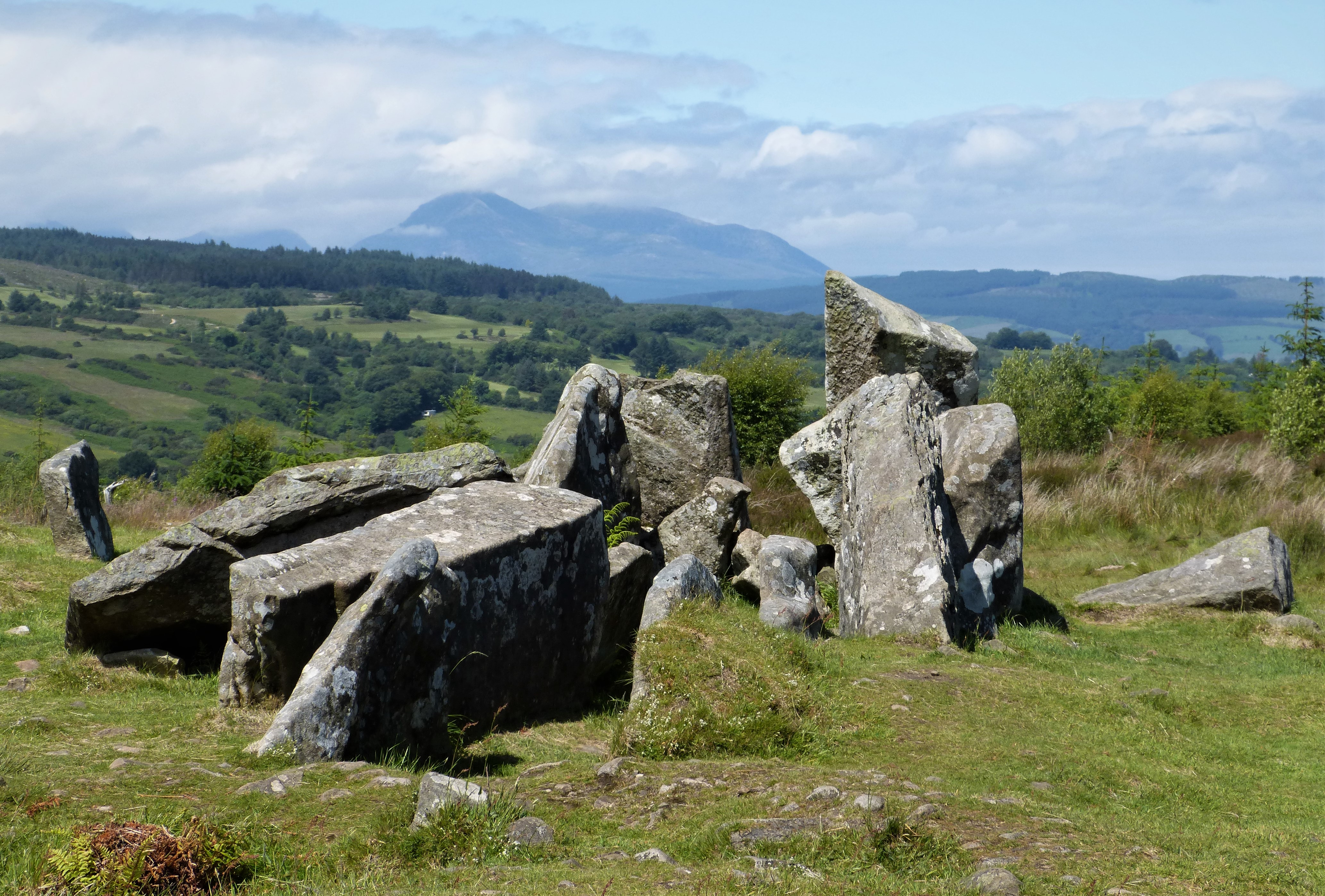
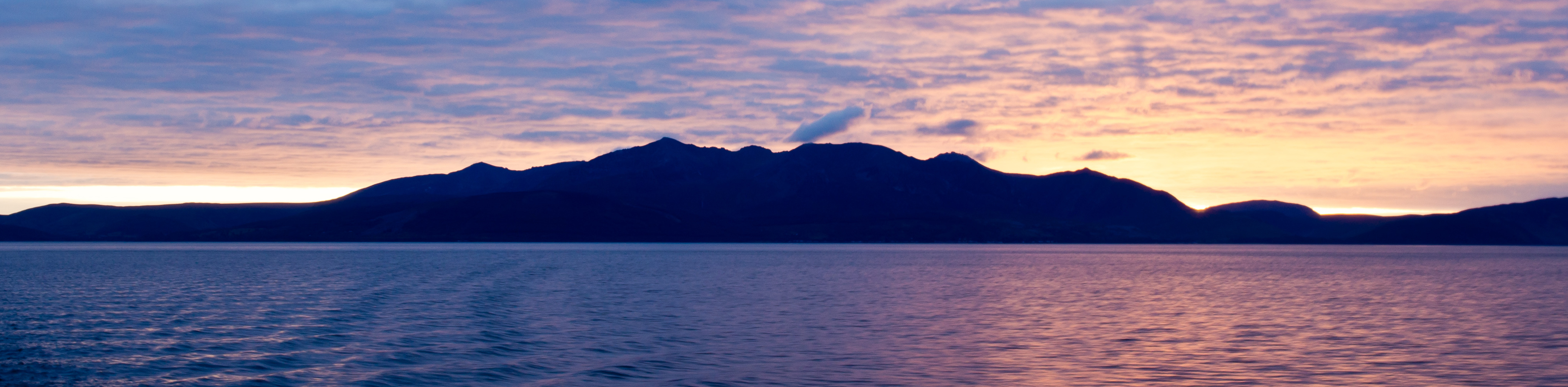
- Brodick harbour & Goatfell Glen Rosa King's Cave Lochranza Castle Giants' Graves Arran seen from the east

Location
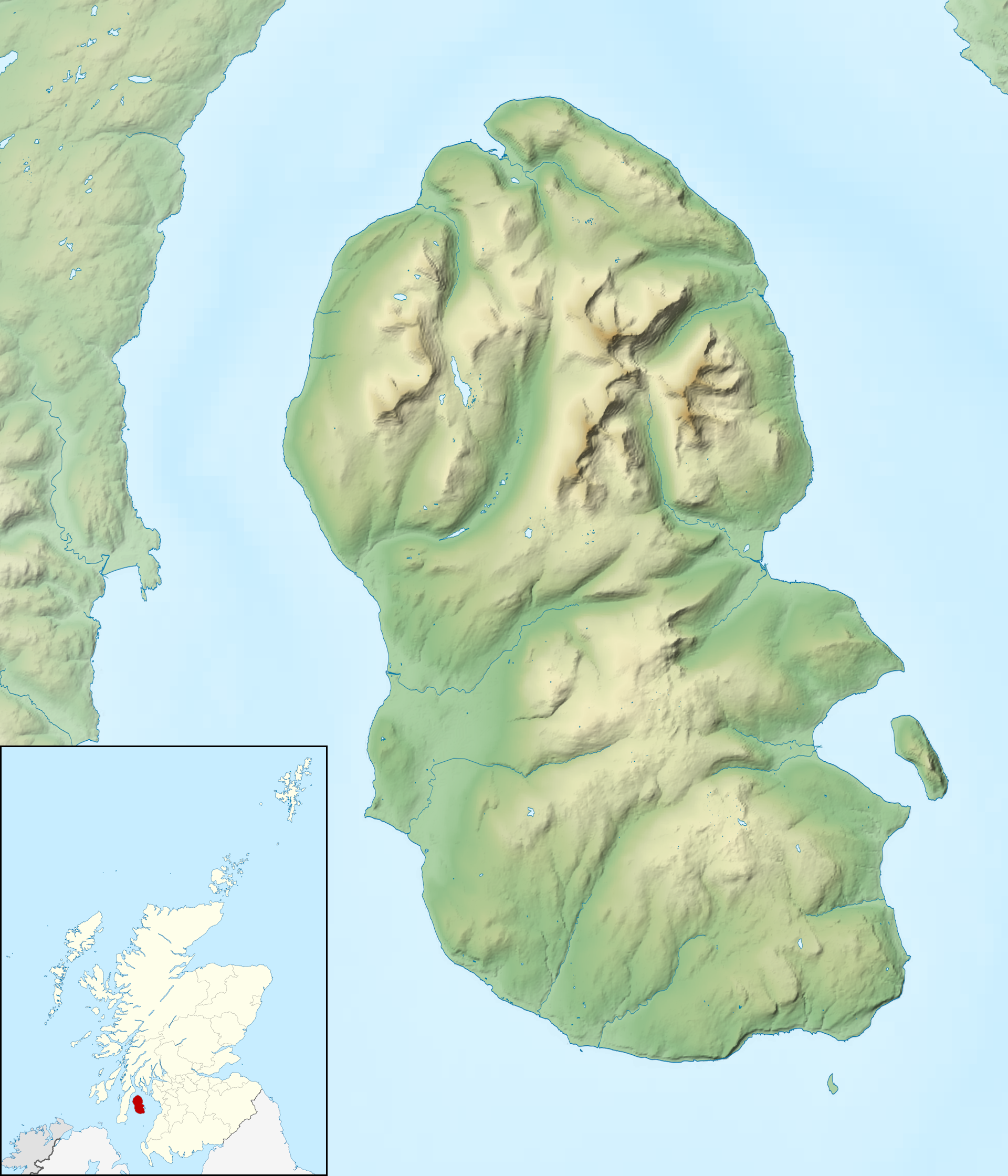
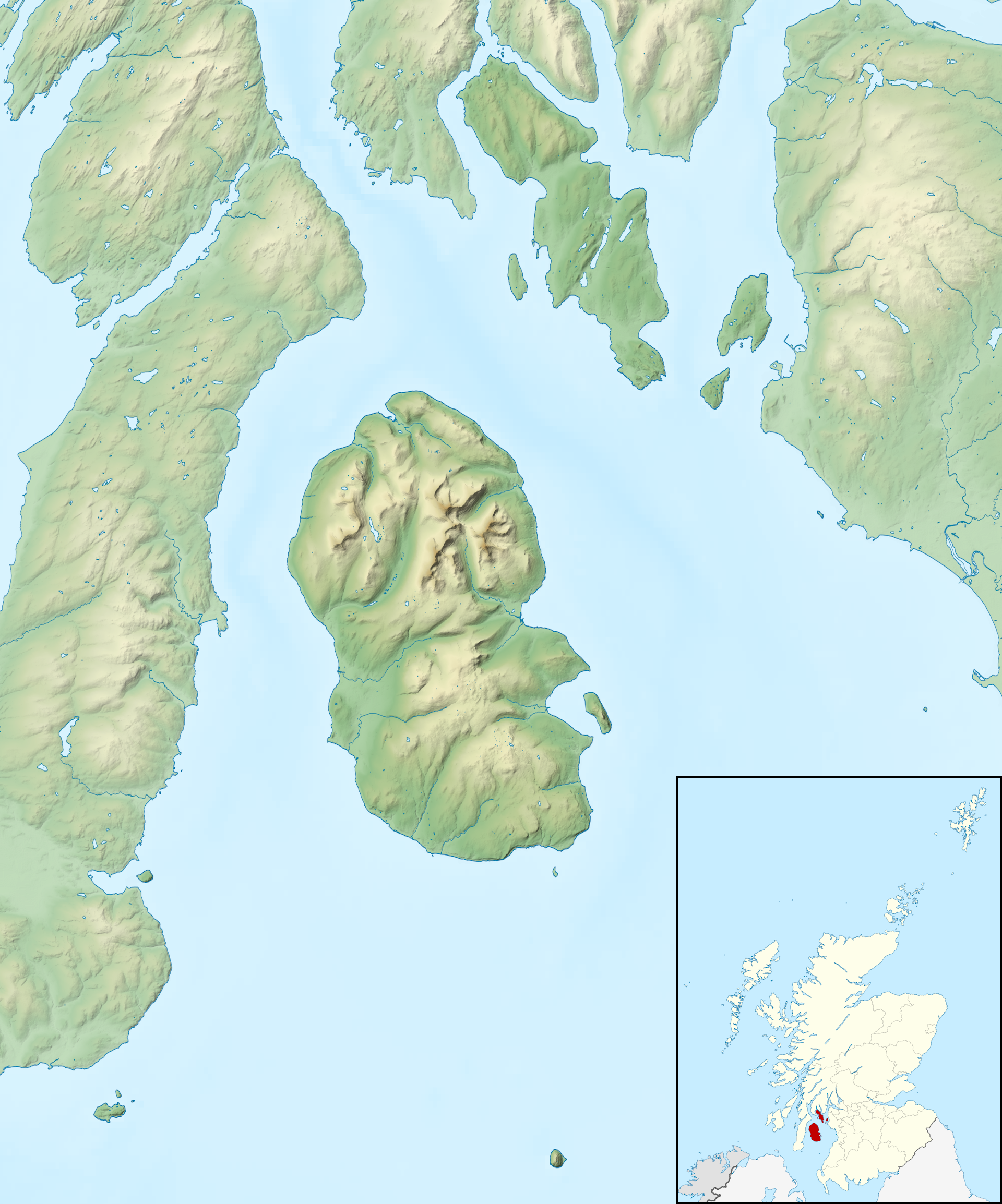
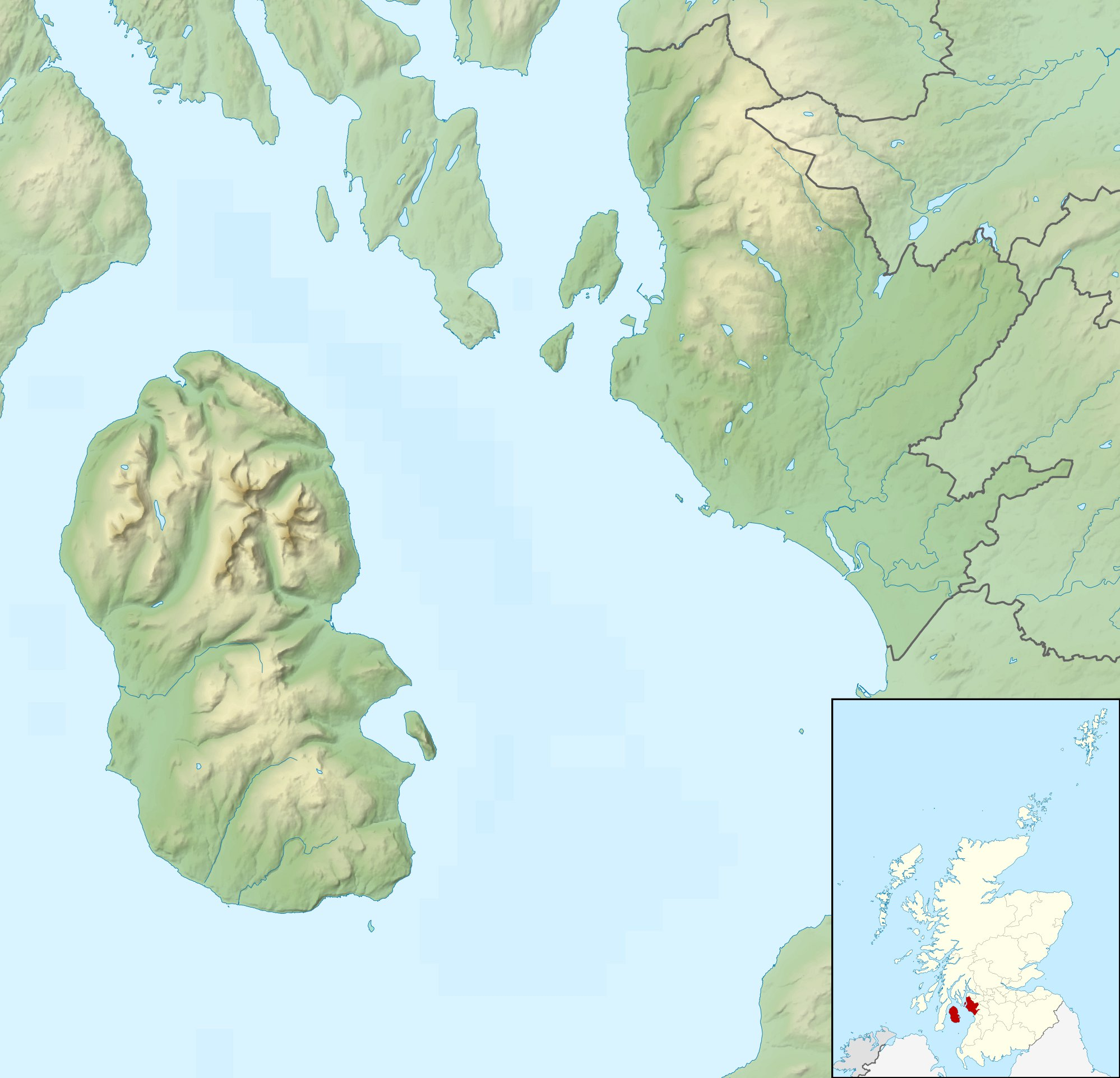
- Map of Arran & surrounding islands Arran shown with the other islands of the Clyde Arran shown within North Ayrshire
- OS grid reference: NR950359
- Coordinates: 55.5775°N 5.2375°W

Name
- Gaelic pronunciation: [ˈelan ˈaɾɪɲ]
- Name meaning: Possibly Brythonic for "high place"
- Old Norse name: Herrey

Physical geography
- Island group: Firth of Clyde
- Area: 43,201 hectares (167 sq mi)
- Area rank: 7
- Highest elevation: Goat Fell 875 m (2,871 ft)

Administration
- Council area: North Ayrshire
- Country: Scotland
- Sovereign state: United Kingdom

Demographics
- Population: 4,618
- Population rank: 6
- Population density: 10.69 people/km^{2}
- Largest settlement: Lamlash

The Isle of Arran (/ˈærən/; Scottish Gaelic: Eilean Arainn) or simply Arran is an island off the west coast of Scotland. It is the largest island in the Firth of Clyde and the seventh-largest Scottish island, at 432 square kilometres (167 sq mi). Historically part of Buteshire, it is in the unitary council area of North Ayrshire. In the 2022 census it had a resident population of 4,618. Though culturally and physically similar to the Hebrides, it is separated from them by the Kintyre peninsula. Often referred to as "Scotland in Miniature", the island is divided into highland and lowland areas by the Highland Boundary Fault and has been described as a "geologist's paradise".

Arran has been continuously inhabited since the early Neolithic period. Numerous prehistoric remains have been found. From the 6th century onwards, Goidelic-speaking peoples from Ireland colonised it and it became a centre of religious activity. In the troubled Viking Age, Arran became the property of the Norwegian crown, until formally absorbed by the kingdom of Scotland in the 13th century. The 19th-century "clearances" led to significant depopulation and the end of the Gaelic language and way of life. The economy and population have recovered in recent years, the main industry being tourism. However, the increase in tourism and people buying holiday homes on the island, the second highest rate of such homes in the UK, has led to a shortage of affordable homes on the island. There is a diversity of wildlife, including three species of tree endemic to the area.

The island includes miles of coastal pathways, numerous hills and mountains, forested areas, rivers, small lochs and beaches. Its main beaches are at Brodick, Whiting Bay, Kildonan, Sannox and Blackwaterfoot.

== Etymology ==
Most of the islands of Scotland have been occupied consecutively by speakers of at least four languages since the Iron Age. Therefore, the names of many islands have more than one possible origin, including Arran. Mac an Tàilleir (2003) says the name "is said to be unrelated" to those of Arranmore or the Aran Islands in Ireland, which come from Irish Árainn meaning "kidney-shaped", though he does not rule out this derivation.

Unusually for a Scottish island, Haswell-Smith (2004) and William Cook Mackenzie (1931) offer a Brythonic derivation and a meaning of "high place" (compare Middle Welsh aran) which at least corresponds with the geography – Arran is significantly loftier than all the land that immediately surrounds it along the shores of the Firth of Clyde.

Any other Brythonic place-names that may have existed, save perhaps for Mayish, were later replaced on Arran as the Goidelic-speaking Gaels spread from Ireland, via their adjacent kingdom of Dál Riata.

During the Viking Age it became, along with most Scottish islands, the property of the Norwegian crown, at which time it may have been known as Herrey or Hersey. As a result of Norse influence, many current place-names on Arran are of Viking origin.

== History ==
=== Prehistory ===
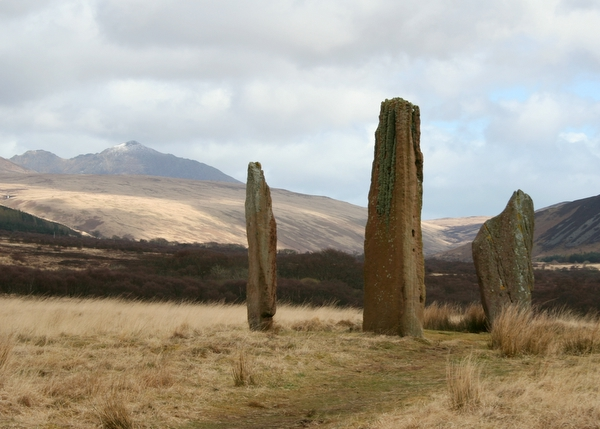
Machrie Moor Standing Stones

Arran has a particular concentration of early Neolithic Clyde Cairns, a form of Gallery grave. The typical style of these is a rectangular or trapezoidal stone and earth mound that encloses a chamber lined with larger stone slabs. Pottery and bone fragments found inside them suggest they were used for interment and some have forecourts, which may have been an area for public display or ritual. There are two good examples in Monamore Glen west of the village of Lamlash, and similar structures called the Giants' Graves above Whiting Bay. There are numerous standing stones dating from prehistoric times, including six stone circles on Machrie Moor (Gaelic: Am Machaire).

Pitchstone deposits on the island were used locally to make various items in the Mesolithic era. In the Neolithic and the Early Bronze Age pitchstone from the Isle of Arran or items made from it were transported around Britain. It is thought to be the source of most, it not all, pitchstone artefacts found in the United Kingdom. There are more than 100 document sources of the material on the island that prehistoric people could have collected/mined from.

Several Bronze Age sites have been excavated, including Ossian's Mound near Clachaig and a cairn near Blackwaterfoot that produced a bronze dagger and a gold fillet. Torr a' Chaisteal Dun in the south west near Sliddery is the ruin of an Iron Age fortified structure dating from about AD 200. The original walls would have been 3 metres (9.8 ft) or more thick and enclosed a circular area about 14 metres (46 ft) in diameter.

In 2019, a Lidar survey revealed 1,000 ancient sites in Arran including a cursus near Drumadoon. Excavation began in 2023. This is believed to be the only complete example in Britain.

=== Gaels, Vikings and Middle Ages ===
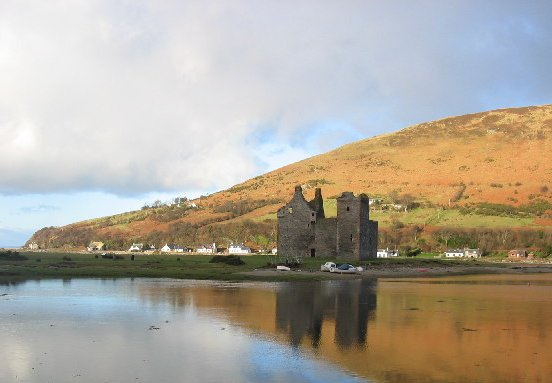
Lochranza Castle, 16th century

An ancient Irish poem called Agalllamh na Senorach, first recorded in the 13th century, describes the attractions of the island.

Arran of the many stags
The sea strikes against her shoulders,
Companies of men can feed there,
Blue spears are reddened among her boulders.

Merry hinds are on her hills,
Juicy berries are there for food,
Refreshing water in her streams,
Nuts in plenty in the wood.

The monastery of Aileach founded by St. Brendan in the 6th century may have been on Arran, with Holy Isle being a centre of Brendan's activities. The caves below Keil Point (Gaelic: Rubha na Cille) contain a slab which may have been an ancient altar. This stone has two petrosomatoglyphs on it, the prints of two right feet, said to be of Saint Columba.

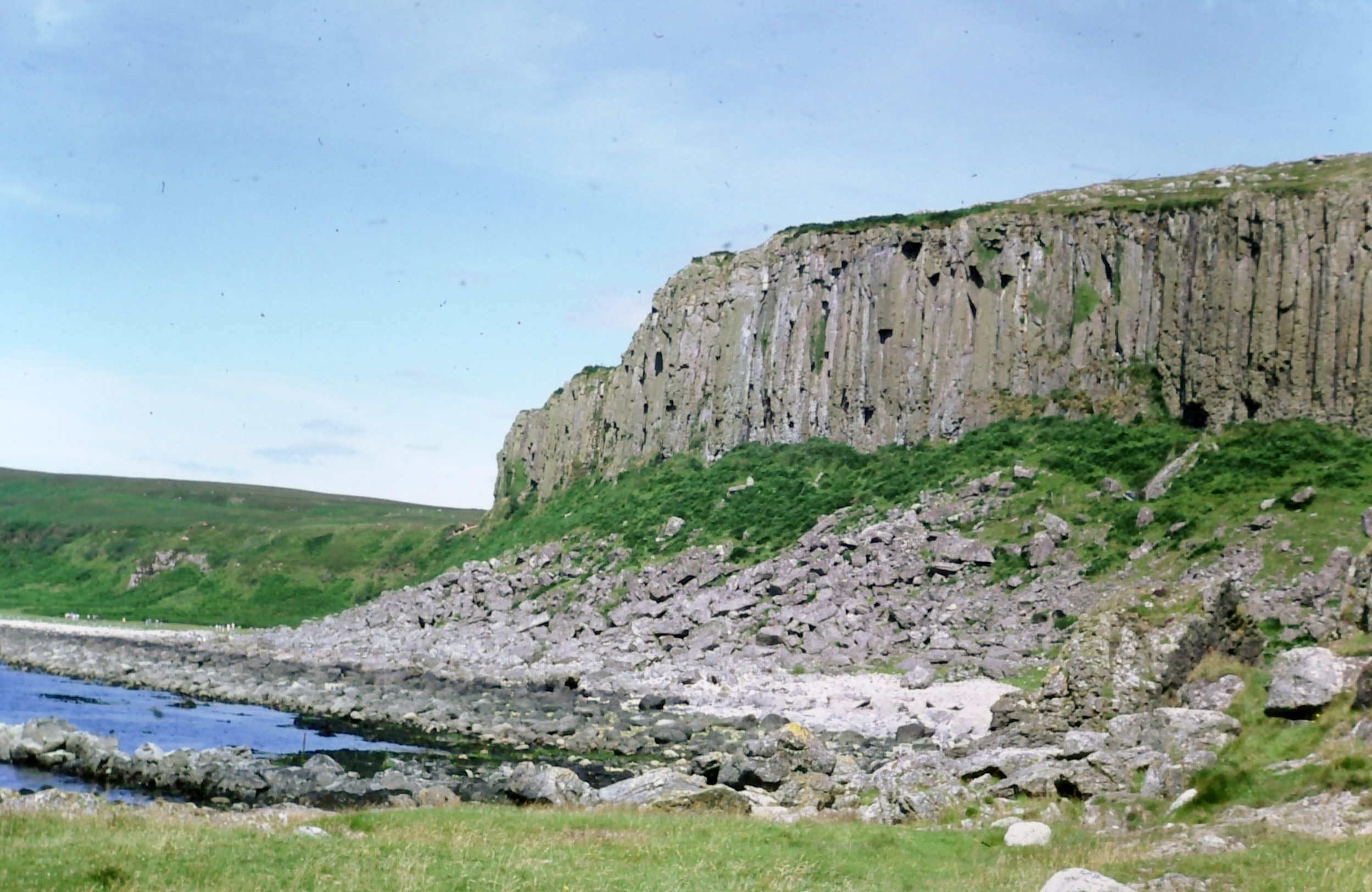
Cliffs at Blackwaterfoot

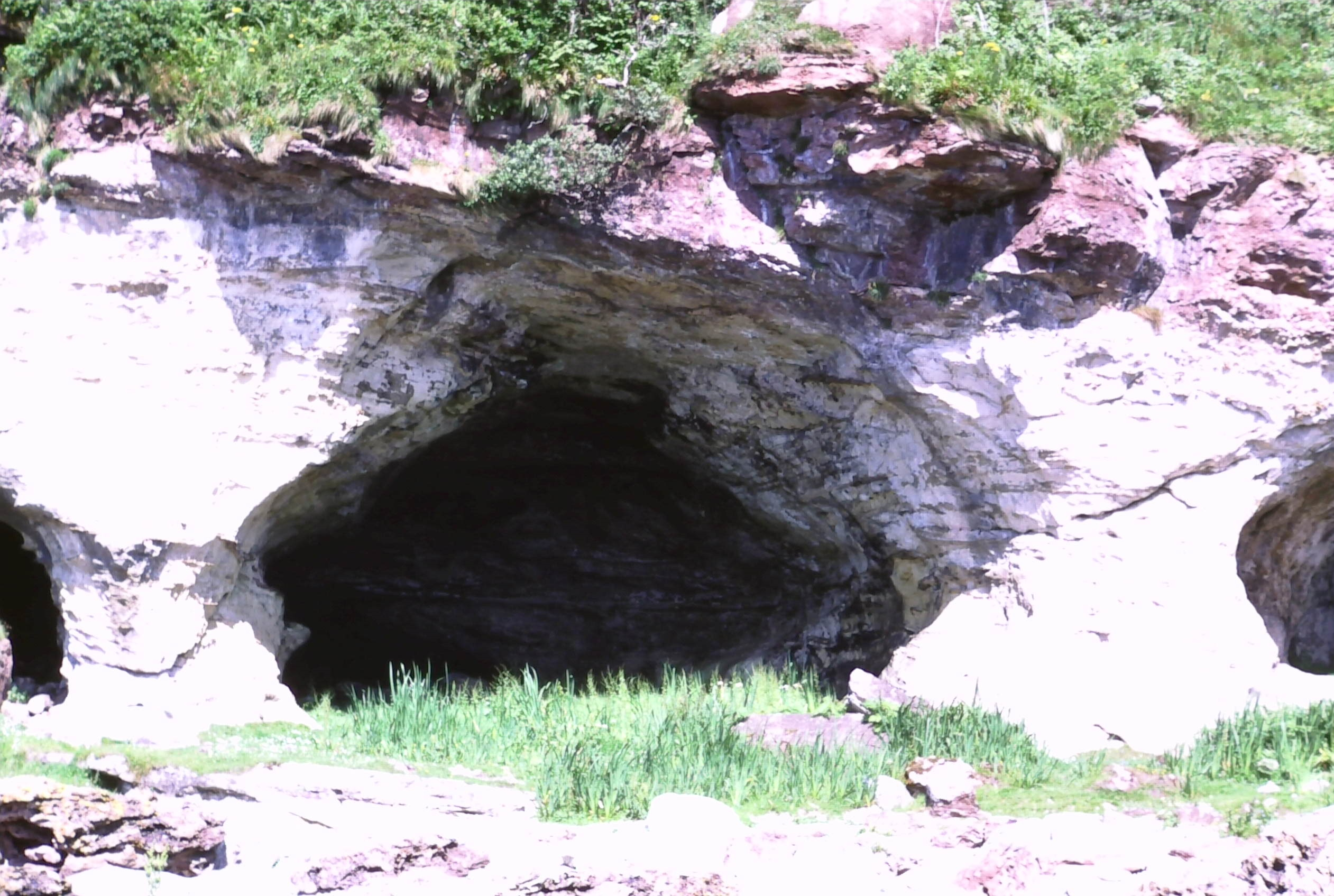
The "King's Cave", reputedly a refuge of King Robert the Bruce

In the 11th century Arran became part of the Sodor (Old Norse: 'Suðr-eyjar'), or South Isles of the Kingdom of Mann and the Isles, but on the death of Godred Crovan in 1095 all the isles came under the direct rule of Magnus III of Norway. Lagman (1103–1104) restored local rule. After the death of Somerled in 1164, Arran and Bute were ruled by his son Angus. In 1237, the Scottish isles broke away completely from the Isle of Man and became an independent kingdom. After the indecisive Battle of Largs between the kingdoms of Norway and Scotland in 1263, Haakon Haakonsson, King of Norway reclaimed Norwegian lordship over the "provinces" of the west. Arriving at Mull, he rewarded a number of his Norse-Gaelic vassals with grants of lands. Bute was given to Ruadhri and Arran to Murchad MacSween. (Note: Murchad MacSween is called "Margad" in the original Norwegian text. According to Hákonar saga Hákonarsonar, "In this expedition King Haco regained all those provinces which King Magnus Barefoot had acquired, and conquered from the Scotch and Hebrideans, as is here narrated.") Following Haakon's death later that year Norway ceded the islands of western Scotland to the Scottish crown in 1266 by the Treaty of Perth. A substantial Viking grave has been discovered near King's Cross south of Lamlash, containing whalebone, iron rivets and nails, fragments of bronze and a 9th-century bronze coin, and another grave of similar date nearby yielded a sword and shield. Arran was part of the medieval Bishopric of Sodor and Man.

On the opposite side of the island near Blackwaterfoot is the King's Cave where Robert the Bruce is said to have taken shelter in the 14th century. Bruce returned to the island in 1326, having earlier granted lands to Fergus MacLouis for assistance rendered during his time of concealment there. Brodick Castle played a prominent part in the island's medieval history. Probably dating from the 13th century, it was captured by English forces during the Wars of Independence before being taken back by Scottish troops in 1307. It was badly damaged by action from English ships in 1406 and sustained an attack by John of Islay, the Lord of the Isles in 1455. Originally a seat of the Clan Stewart of Menteith it passed to the Boyd family in the 15th century. For a short time during the reign of King James V in the 16th century, the Isle of Arran was under the regency of Robert Maxwell, 5th Lord Maxwell.

=== Modern era ===
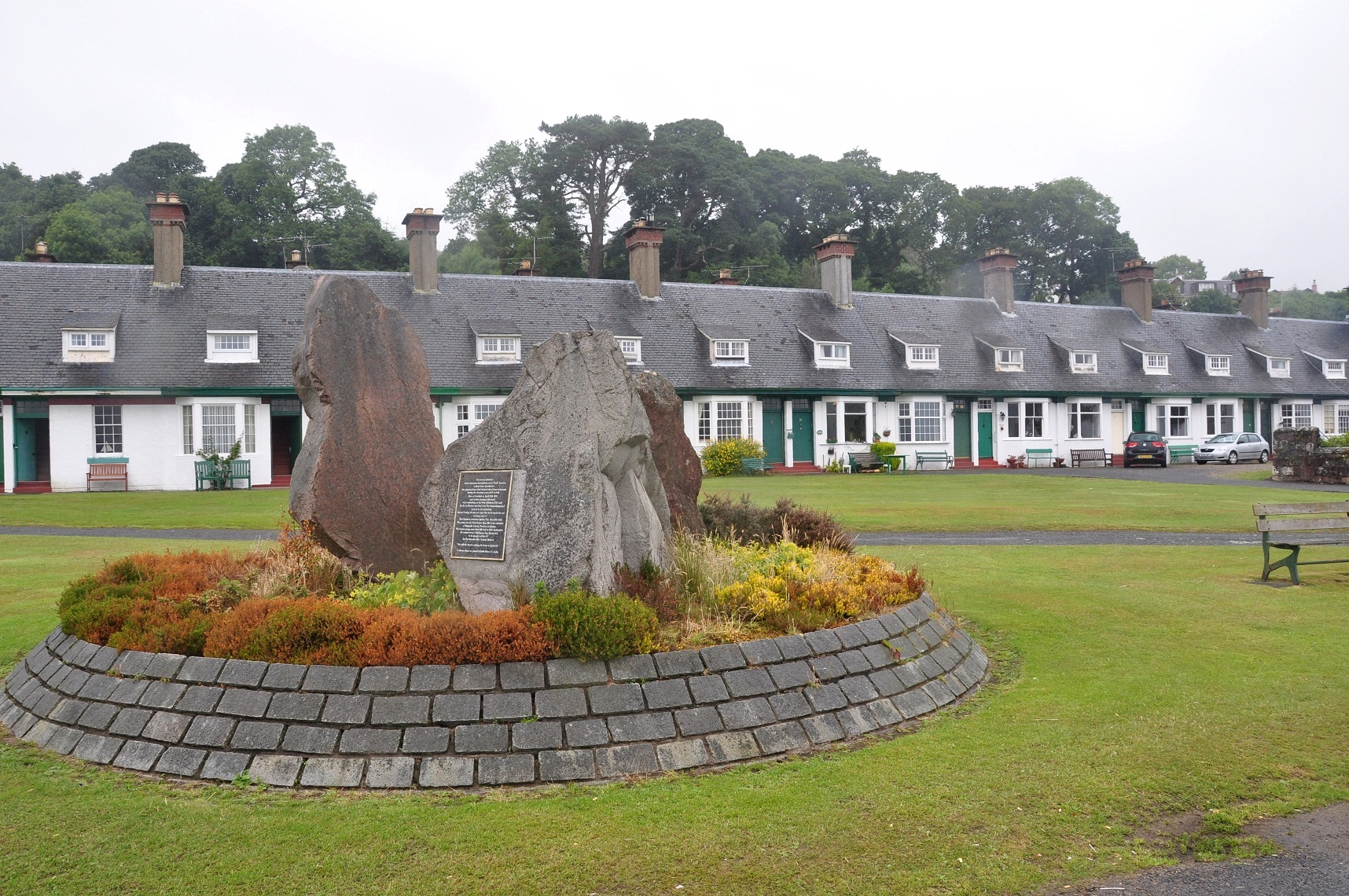
"Hamilton Terrace" with the Clearances Monument, Lamlash

At the commencement of the Early modern period James, 2nd Lord Hamilton became a privy counsellor to his first cousin, James IV of Scotland and helped to arrange his marriage to Princess Margaret Tudor of England. As a reward he was created Earl of Arran in 1503. The local economy for much of this period was based on the run rig system, the basic crops being oats, barley and potatoes. The population slowly grew to about 6,500. In the early 19th century Alexander, 10th Duke of Hamilton (1767–1852) embarked on a programme of clearances that had a devastating effect on the island's population. These "improvements" typically led to land that had been rented out to as many as 27 families being converted into a single farm. In some cases, land was promised in Canada for each adult emigrant male. In April 1829, for example, 86 islanders boarded the brig Caledonia for the two-month journey, half their fares being paid for by the Duke. However, on arrival in Quebec only 41 hectares (100 acres) was made available to the heads of extended families. Whole villages were removed and the Gaelic culture of the island devastated. The writer James Hogg wrote, "Ah! Wae's [Woe is] me. I hear the Duke of Hamilton's crofters are a'gaun away, man and mother's son, frae the Isle o' Arran. Pity on us!". A memorial to this has been constructed on the shore at Lamlash, paid for by a Canadian descendant of the emigrants.

Goatfell was the scene of the death of English tourist Edwin Rose who was allegedly murdered by John Watson Laurie in 1889 on the mountain. Laurie was sentenced to death, later commuted to a life sentence and spent the rest of his life in prison.

On 10 August 1941 a RAF Consolidated B-24 Liberator LB-30A AM261 was flying from RAF Heathfield in Ayrshire to Gander International Airport in Newfoundland. However, the B-24 crashed into the hillside of Mullach Buidhe north of Goat Fell, killing all 22 passengers and crew.

== Geography ==
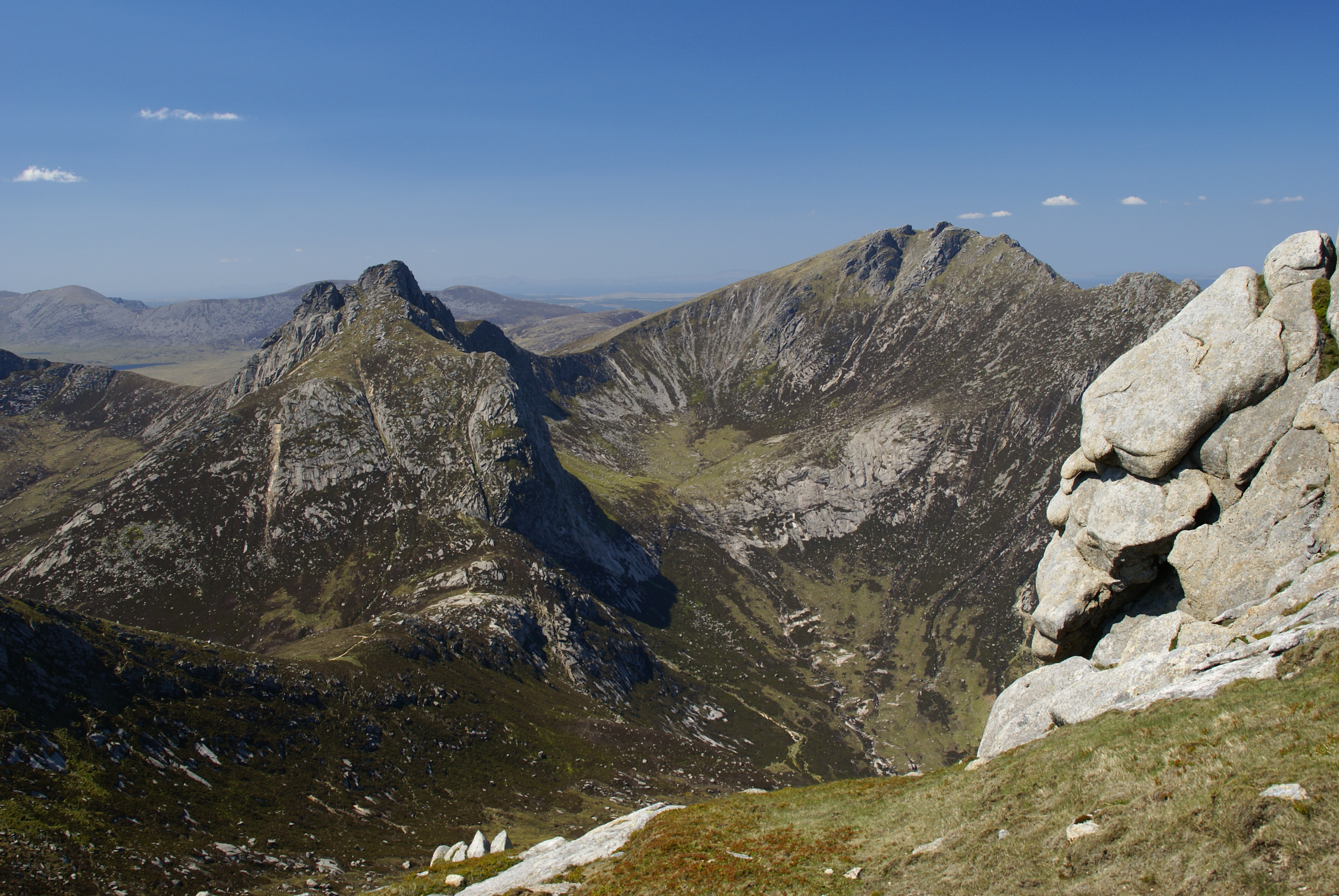
Cìr Mhòr and Caisteal Abhail seen from North Goatfell

The island lies in the Firth of Clyde between Ayr and Ardrossan, and Kintyre. The profile of the north Arran hills as seen from the Ayrshire coast is referred to as the "Sleeping Warrior", due to its resemblance to a resting human figure. The highest of these hills is Goat Fell at 875 metres (2,871 ft). There are three other Corbetts, all in the north east: Caisteal Abhail, Cìr Mhòr and Beinn Tarsuinn. Beinn Bharrain is the highest peak in the north west at 721.4 metres (2,367 ft).

The largest glen on the island is Glen Iorsa to the west, whilst narrow Glen Sannox (Gaelic: Gleann Shannaig) and Glen Rosa (Gaelic: Gleann Ròsa) to the east surround Goat Fell. The terrain to the south is less mountainous, although a considerable portion of the interior lies above 350 metres (1,150 ft), and A' Chruach reaches 512.5 metres (1,681 ft) at its summit. There are two other Marilyns in the south, Tighvein and Mullach Mòr (Holy Island).

=== Villages ===
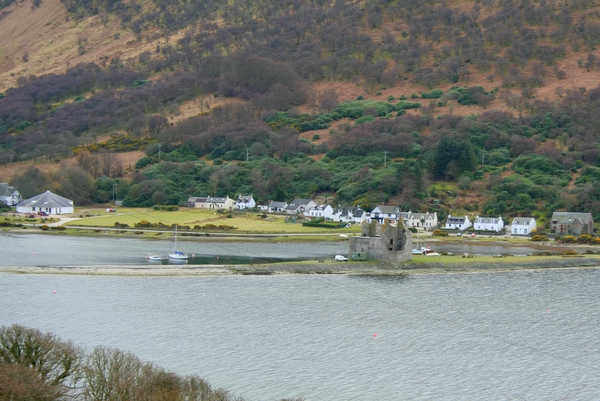
Lochranza village and castle

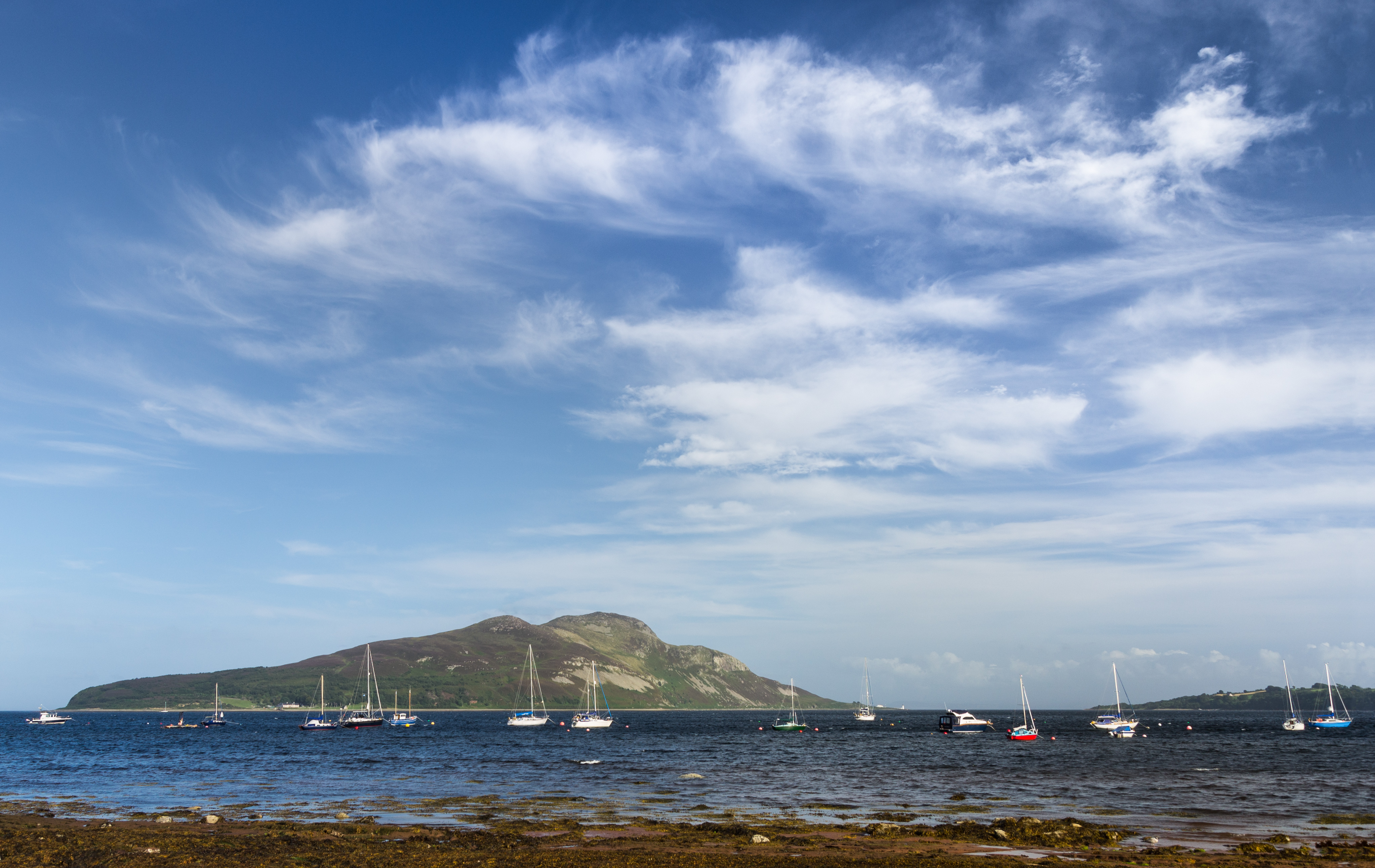
Holy Island as seen from Arran

Arran has several villages, mainly around the shoreline. Brodick (old Norse: 'broad bay') is the site of the ferry terminal, several hotels, and the majority of shops. Brodick Castle is a seat of the Dukes of Hamilton. Lamlash, however, is the largest village on the island and in 2001 had a population of 1,010 (1,100 mid-2020 est.) compared to 621 for Brodick. Other villages include Lochranza and Catacol in the north, Corrie in the north east, Blackwaterfoot and Kilmory in the south west, Kildonan in the south and Whiting Bay in the south east.

=== Surrounding islands ===
Arran has three smaller satellite islands: Holy Island lies to the east opposite Lamlash, Pladda is located off Arran's south coast and tiny Hamilton Isle lies just off Clauchlands Point 1.2 kilometres (0.75 mi) north of Holy Island. Eilean na h-Àirde Bàine off the south west of Arran at Corriecravie is a skerry connected to Arran at low tide. Ailsa Craig is situated south east of Arran and on a clear day is visible from most of Arran's south coast.

Other islands in the Firth of Clyde include Bute, Great Cumbrae and Inchmarnock.

=== Geology ===
The division between the "Highland" and "Lowland" areas of Arran is marked by the Highland Boundary Fault which runs north east to south west across Scotland. Arran is a popular destination for geologists, who come to see intrusive igneous landforms such as sills and dykes, and sedimentary and meta-sedimentary rocks ranging in age from Precambrian to Mesozoic.

Most of the interior of the northern half of the island is taken up by a large granite batholith that was created by substantial magmatic activity around 58 million years ago in the Paleogene period. This comprises an outer ring of coarse granite and an inner core of finer grained granite, which was intruded later. This granite was intruded into the Late Proterozoic to Cambrian metasediments of the Dalradian Supergroup. Other Paleogene igneous rocks on Arran include extensive felsic and composite sills in the south of the island, and the central ring complex, an eroded caldera system surrounded by a near-continuous ring of granitic rocks.

Sedimentary rocks dominate the southern half of the island, especially Old and New Red Sandstone. Some of these sandstones contain fulgurites – pitted marks that may have been created by Permian lightning strikes. Large aeolian sand dunes are preserved in Permian sandstones near Brodick, showing the presence of an ancient desert. Within the central complex are subsided blocks of Triassic sandstone and marl, Jurassic shale, and even a rare example of Cretaceous chalk. During the 19th century barytes was mined near Sannox. First discovered in 1840, nearly 5,000 tons were produced between 1853 and 1862. The mine was closed by the 11th Duke of Hamilton on the grounds that it "spoiled the solemn grandeur of the scene" but was reopened after the First World War and operated until 1938 when the vein ran out.

Visiting in 1787, the geologist James Hutton found his first example of an unconformity to the north of Newton Point near Lochranza, which provided evidence for his Plutonist theories of uniformitarianism and about the age of the Earth. This spot is one of the most famous places in the study of geology.

The Pleistocene glaciations almost entirely covered Scotland in ice, and Arran's highest peaks may have been nunataks at this time. After the last retreat of the ice at the close of the Pleistocene epoch sea levels were up to 70 metres (230 ft) lower than at present and it is likely that circa 14,000 BP the island was connected to mainland Scotland. Sea level changes and the isostatic rise of land makes charting post-glacial coastlines a complex task, but it is evident that the island is ringed by post glacial raised beaches. King's Cave on the south west coast is an example of an emergent landform on such a raised beach. This cave, which is over 30.5 metres (100 ft) long and up to 15.3 metres (50 ft) high, lies well above the present day sea level. There are tall sea cliffs to the north east including large rock slides under the heights of Torr Reamhar, Torr Meadhonach and at Scriden (An Scriodan) at the far north end of the island.

The island has the highest concentration of pitchstone sources in the United Kingdom, with approximately 100 documented sources of it on the island.

=== Climate ===
The influence of the Atlantic Ocean and the Gulf Stream create a mild oceanic climate. Temperatures are generally cool, averaging about 6 °C (43 °F) in January and 16 °C (61 °F) in July at sea level. The southern half of the island, being less mountainous, has a more favourable climate than the north, and the east coast is more sheltered from the prevailing winds than the west and south.

Snow seldom lies at sea level and frosts are less frequent than on the mainland. As in most islands of the west coast of Scotland, annual rainfall is generally high at between 1,500 mm (59 in) in the south and west and 1,900 mm (75 in) in the north and east. The mountains are wetter still with the summits receiving over 2,550 mm (100 in) annually. May and June are the sunniest months, with upwards of 200 hours of bright sunshine being recorded on average.

== Demography and services ==
=== Population ===
Overview of population trends
Year	Population	Year	Population
1755	3,646	1931	4,506
1782	5,804	1961	3,700
1821	6,600	1971	3,564
1841	6,241	1981	3,845
1881	4,730	1991	4,474
1891	4,824	2001	5,058
		2011	4,629

Arran's resident population was 4,629 in 2011, a decline of over 8 per cent from the 5,045 recorded in 2001, against a background of Scottish island populations as a whole growing by 4 per cent to 103,702 over the same period.

=== Local government ===
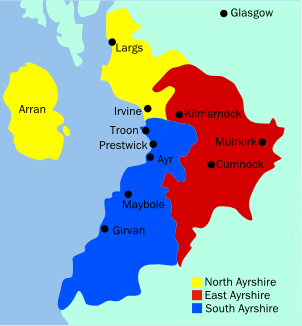
Arran's location within Ayrshire

From the 17th to the late 20th century, Arran was part of the County of Bute. After the 1975 reorganisation of local government Arran became part of the district of Cunninghame in Strathclyde Region. This two-tier system of local government lasted until 1996 when the Local Government etc. (Scotland) Act 1994 came into effect, abolishing the regions and districts and replacing them with 32 council areas. Arran is now in the North Ayrshire council area, along with some of the other constituent islands of the County of Bute.

In the 2017 North Ayrshire Council election, the Ardrossan and Arran Ward elected two SNP and one Scottish Conservative Party councillors. Following boundary changes, Arran became its own single-member ward in the 2022 North Ayrshire Council election, electing a single Scottish Conservative councillor.

For some statistical purposes Arran is within the registration county of Bute, and for ceremonial purposes it forms part of the lieutenancy area of Ayrshire and Arran.

In the House of Commons, since 2005 it has been part of the Ayrshire North and Arran constituency, represented since 2024 by Irene Campbell of the Labour party. It had been part of Cunninghame North from 1983 to 2005, and of Ayrshire North and Bute from 1918 to 1983. In the Scottish Parliament, Arran is part of the constituency of Cunninghame North, currently represented by Kenneth Gibson of the SNP. The Scottish Labour Party held the seat until 2007, when the SNP gained it by 48 votes, making it the most marginal seat in Holyrood until 2011, when the SNP increased its majority to 6,117 over Labour. Cunninghame North sits within the West Scotland Scottish Parliament Electoral Region.

=== Health services ===
NHS Ayrshire and Arran is responsible for the provision of health services for the island. Arran War Memorial Hospital is a 17-bed acute hospital at Lamlash. The Arran Medical Group provides primary-care services and supports the hospital. The practice is based at Brodick Health Centre and has three base surgeries and four branch surgeries.

=== Transport ===
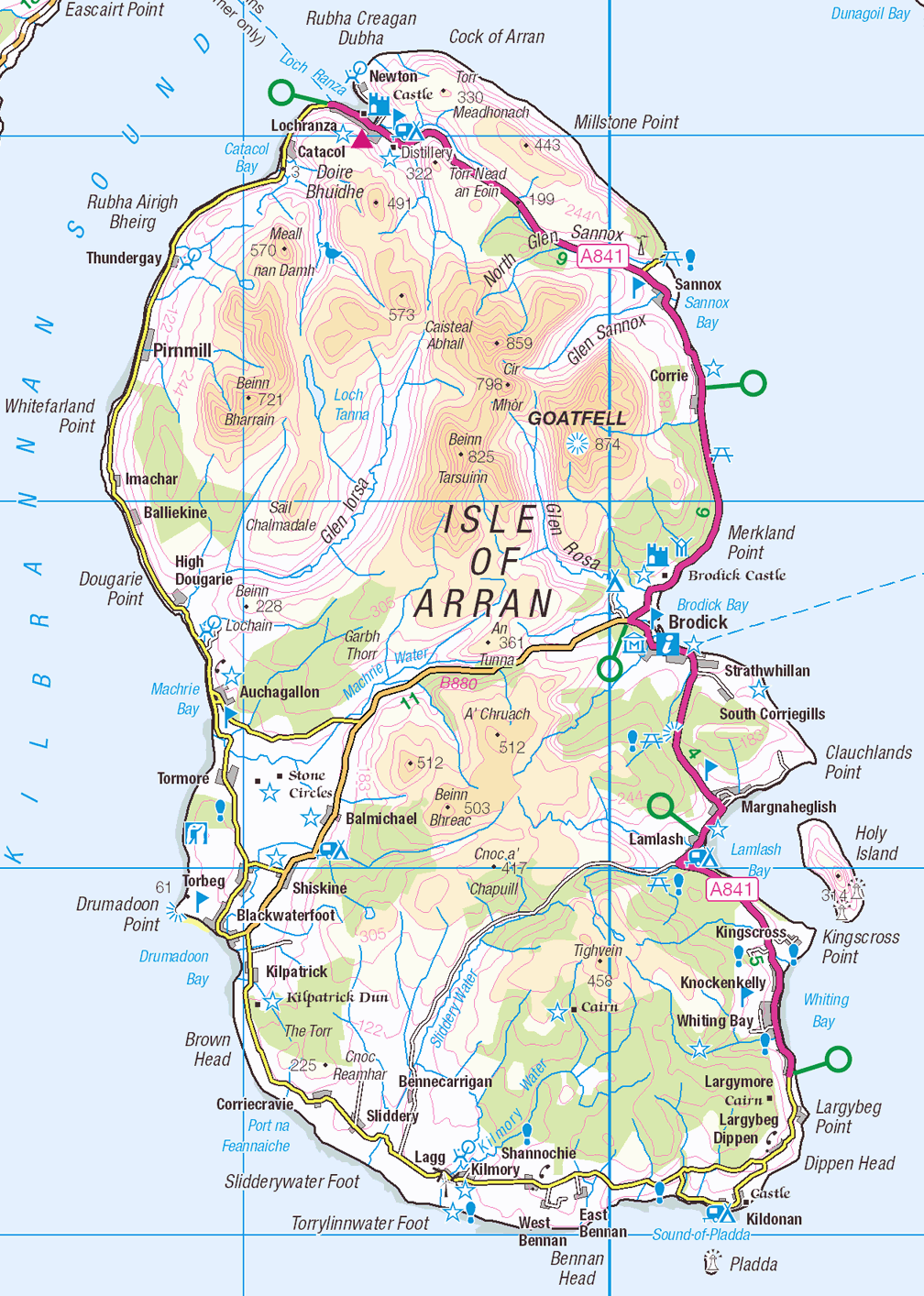
Map of Arran. The island to the east is Holy Island and the tiny island to the south is Pladda.

Arran is connected to the Scottish mainland by two ferry routes operated by Caledonian MacBrayne (CalMac). The Brodick to Ardrossan service is provided by MV Caledonian Isles, with additional summer sailings by MV Isle of Arran. A service to Lochranza is provided by MV Catriona from Claonaig in summer and from Tarbert in winter. Summer day trips are available on board the paddle steamer PS Waverley, and a summer service operated by a local resident connects Lamlash to the neighbouring Holy Island.

Brodick Ferry Terminal underwent £22 million of work to improve connections to the island. The new terminal includes better passenger facilities, increased passenger and freight capacity, and a new pier, all of which were set to open in August 2017 but finally opened on 20 March 2018, due to various construction issues. The island is served by a new £200-million dual-fuelled ferry, Glen Sannox, which has capacity for 1,000 passengers. Glen Sannox was due to enter service in 2018, but due to significant delays and cost increases, the vessel entered service in January 2025 and is to be followed by another new vessel, MV Glen Rosa. The delay to the arrival of these ferries has been dubbed the 'Ferry Fiasco'.

There are three through roads on the island. The 90 km (56 mi) coast road circumnavigates the island. In 2007, a 48 km (30 mi) stretch of this road, previously designated as A841, was de-classified as a C road. Travelling south from Whiting Bay, the C147 goes round the south coast continuing north up the west coast of the island to Lochranza. At this point the road becomes the A841 down the east coast back to Whiting Bay. At one point the coast road ventures inland to climb the 200 metres (660 ft) pass at the Boguillie between Creag Ghlas Laggan and Caisteal Abhail, located between Sannox and Lochranza.

The other two roads run across from the east to the west side of the island. The main cross-island road is the 19 km (12 mi) B880 from Brodick to Blackwaterfoot, called "The String", which climbs over Gleann an t-Suidhe. About 10 kilometres (6 mi) from Brodick, a minor road branches off to the right to Machrie. The single-track road "The Ross" runs 15 kilometres (9 mi) from Lamlash to Lagg and Sliddery via Glen Scorodale (Gaelic: Gleann Sgoradail).

The island can be explored using a public bus service operated by Stagecoach. The bus service is subsidised by the Strathclyde Partnership for Transport.

== Economy ==
=== Tourism ===
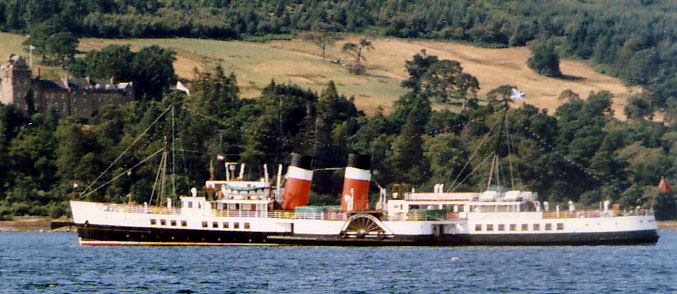
PS Waverley in front of Brodick Castle

The island's main industry is tourism; outdoor activities such as walking, cycling and wildlife watching are especially popular. Popular walking routes include climbing to the summit of Goat Fell, and the Arran Coastal Way, a 107 km (66 mi) trail that goes around the coastline of the island. The Arran Coastal Way was designated as one of Scotland's Great Trails by Scottish Natural Heritage in June 2017.

One of Arran's best known tourist attractions is Brodick Castle, owned by the National Trust for Scotland. The Auchrannie Resort, which contains two hotels, three restaurants, two leisure complexes and an adventure company, is one of biggest employers on the island. The island has a number of golf courses including the 12 hole Shiskine links course, founded in 1896.

=== Other industries ===
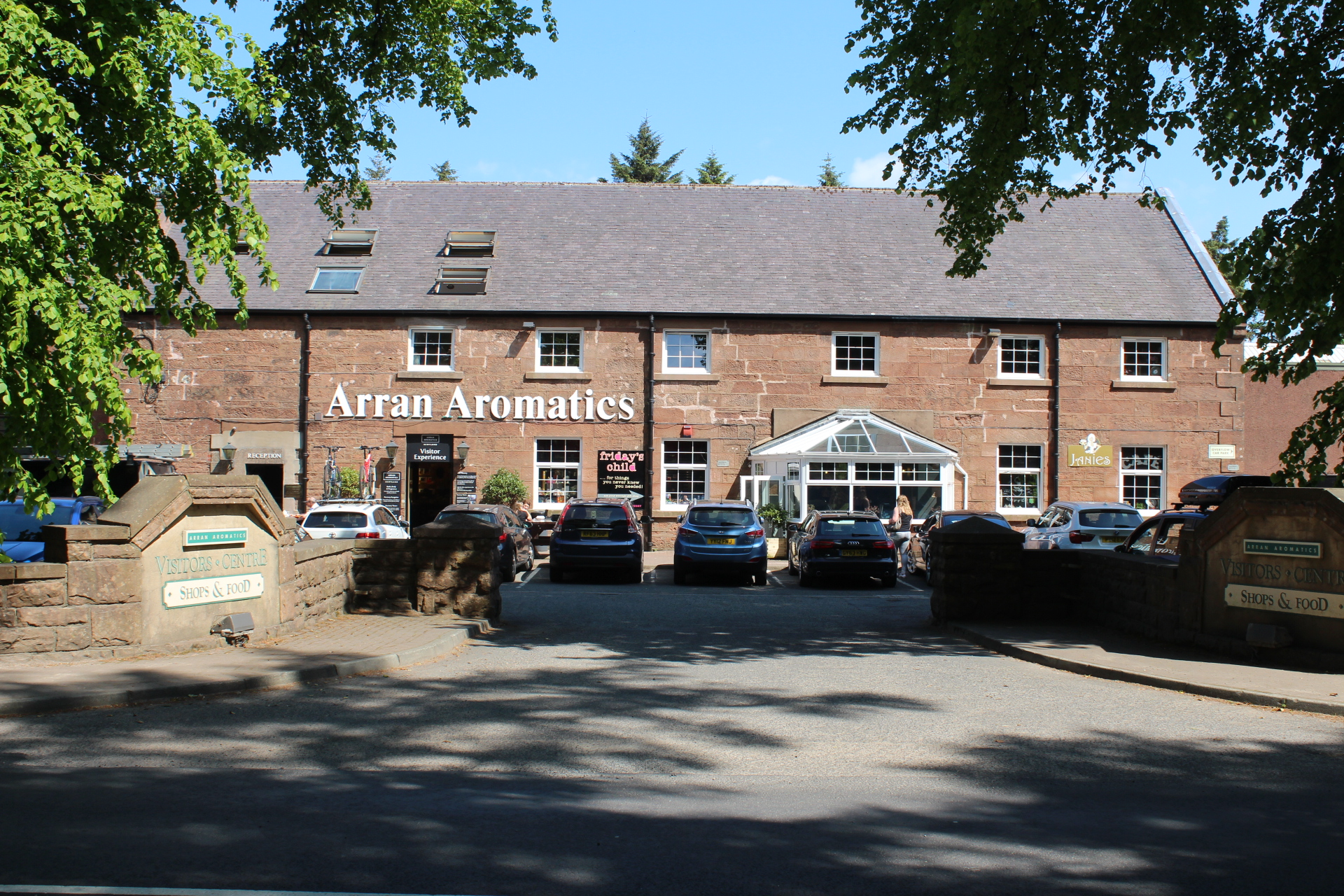
Arran, Sense of Scotland, a cosmetics company based on the island

Farming and forestry are other important industries. Plans in 2008 for a large salmon farm holding 800,000 or more fish in Lamlash Bay were criticised by the Community of Arran Seabed Trust. They feared the facility could jeopardise Scotland's first marine No Take Zone, which was announced in September 2008.

Isle of Arran Brewery is a microbrewery founded in March 2000 in Cladach, near Brodick. The business went into liquidation in May 2008, but was then sold to Marketing Management Services International Ltd in June 2008. It is now back in production and the beers widely available in Scotland, including certain Aldi stores, yet cutting staff in 2017 and 2018. There are two whisky distilleries on the island. Arran distillery opened in 1995 in Lochranza on the north side of the island. The Lochranza distillery, uncharacteristically for the islands, produces an unpeated whisky. In 2019, a second distillery opened in the south of the island. Lagg distillery produces a heavily peated whisky, more traditional of the islands region.

Other businesses include Arran, Sense of Scotland, which produces a range of luxury toiletries, perfumes and candles, Arran Dairies, Arran Cheese Shop, James's Chocolates, Wooleys of Arran and Arran Energy who produce biomass wood fuels from island-grown timber.

== Popular culture ==
The Scottish Gaelic dialect of Arran died out when the last speaker Donald Craig died in the 1970s. However, there is now a Gaelic House in Brodick, set up at the end of the 1990s. Brodick Castle features on the Royal Bank of Scotland £20 note and Lochranza Castle was used as the model for the castle in The Adventures of Tintin, volume seven, The Black Island.

Arran has one newspaper, The Arran Banner. It was listed in the Guinness Book of Records in November 1984 as the "local newspaper which achieves the closest to a saturation circulation in its area". The entry reads: "The Arran Banner, founded in 1974, has a readership of more than 97 per cent in Britain's seventh largest off-shore island." There is an online monthly publication called Voice for Arran, which mainly publishes articles contributed by community members.

Arran landscapes have been the inspiration for numerous famous artists including Cragie Aitchison, Joan Eardley, Jessie M King, and Samuel Peploe.

== Nature and conservation ==
Red deer are numerous on the northern hills, and there are populations of red squirrel, badger, otter, adder and common lizard. Offshore there are harbour porpoises, basking sharks and various species of dolphin.

=== Flora ===
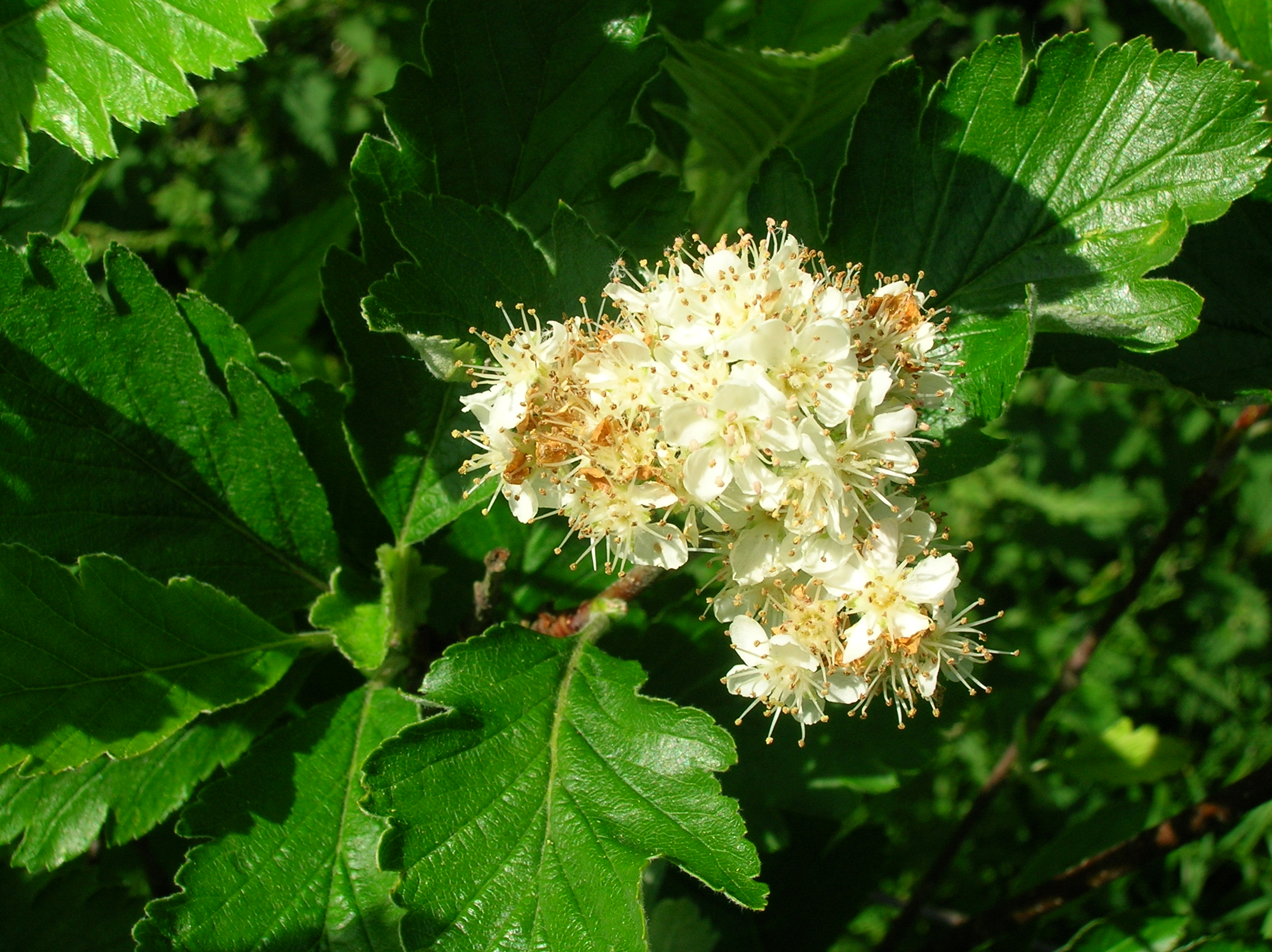
Sorbus arranensis in flower at Eglinton Country Park, Irvine.

The island has three endemic species of tree, the Arran whitebeams. These trees are the Scottish or Arran whitebeam (Sorbus arranensis), the bastard mountain ash or cut-leaved whitebeam (Sorbus pseudofennica) and the Catacol whitebeam (Sorbus pseudomeinichii). If rarity is measured by numbers alone they are amongst the most endangered tree species in the world. The trees grow in Glen Diomhan off Glen Catacol which was formerly a National Nature Reserve. Although this designation was removed in 2011, the area continues to form part of a designated Site of Special Scientific Interest (SSSI), and is monitored by staff from NatureScot. Only 236 Sorbus pseudofennica and 283 Sorbus arranensis were recorded as mature trees in 1980. They are typically trees of the mountain slopes, close to the tree line. However, they will grow at lower altitudes, and are being preserved within Brodick Country Park.

=== Birds ===
Over 250 species of bird have been recorded on Arran, including black guillemot, eider, peregrine falcon, golden eagle, short-eared owl, red-breasted merganser and black-throated diver. In 1981 there were 28 ptarmigan on Arran, but in 2009 it was reported that extensive surveys had been unable to record any. However, the following year a group of 5 was reported. Similarly, the red-billed chough no longer breeds on the island. 108 km^{2} (42 sq mi) of Arran's upland areas is designated a Special Protection Area under the Natura 2000 programme due to its importance for breeding hen harriers.

=== Marine conservation ===
The north of Lamlash Bay became a Marine Protected Area and No Take Zone under the Marine (Scotland) Act 2010, which means no fish or shellfish may be taken in the area. In 2014 the Scottish Government created Scotland's first Marine Conservation Order in order to protect delicate maerl beds off south Arran, after fishermen breached a voluntary agreement not to trawl in the vicinity. The sea surrounding the south of the island is now recognised as one of 31 of Mature Conservation Marine Protected Areas in Scotland. The designation is in place to the maerl beds, as well as other features including: burrowed muds; kelp, seaweed and seagrass beds; and ocean quahog.

=== North Arran National Scenic Area ===
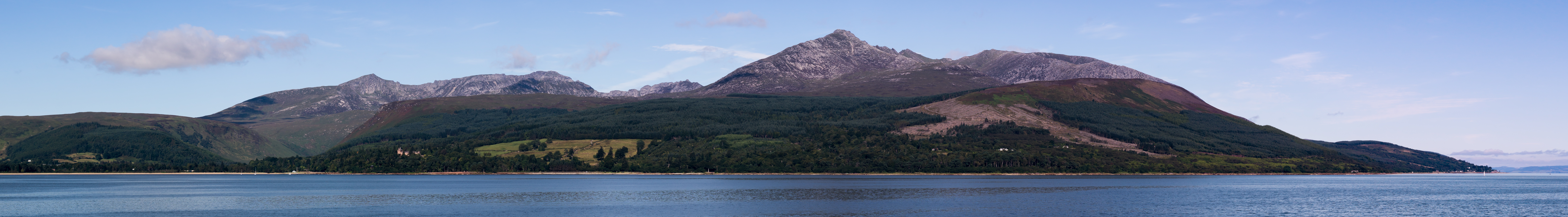
Arran's Northern hills, viewed from the Ardrossan ferry, with Goat Fell the tallest peak.

The northern part of the island is designated a national scenic area (NSA), one of 40 such areas in Scotland which are defined so as to identify areas of exceptional scenery and to ensure its protection by restricting certain forms of development. The North Arran NSA covers 27,304 ha in total, consisting of 20,360 ha of land and a further 6,943 ha of the surrounding sea. It covers all of the island north of Brodick and Machrie Bay, as well as the main group of hills surrounding Goat Fell.

== Notable residents ==
- Sir Kenneth Calman (1941–2025) – Chancellor of the University of Glasgow, former Scottish and UK Chief Medical Officer and author of the Calman Commission on Scottish devolution
- Flora Drummond (1878–1949) – suffragette
- Lieut. Col. James Fullarton, C. B., K. H. (1782–1834) – fought at the Battle of Waterloo.
- Daniel Macmillan (1813–1857) – He and his brother Alexander founded Macmillan Publishers in 1843. His grandson was Prime Minister Harold Macmillan.
- Jack McConnell (born 1960) – First Minister of Scotland (2001–2007)
- Robert McLellan (1907–1985) – playwright and poet in Scots
- Katharine O'Donnelly – actress
- Alison Prince (1931–2019) – children's writer
- J. M. Robertson (1856–1933) – politician and journalist
- Agnes Miller Parker (1895–1980) – engraver and illustrator
