= Arran, Sense of Scotland =

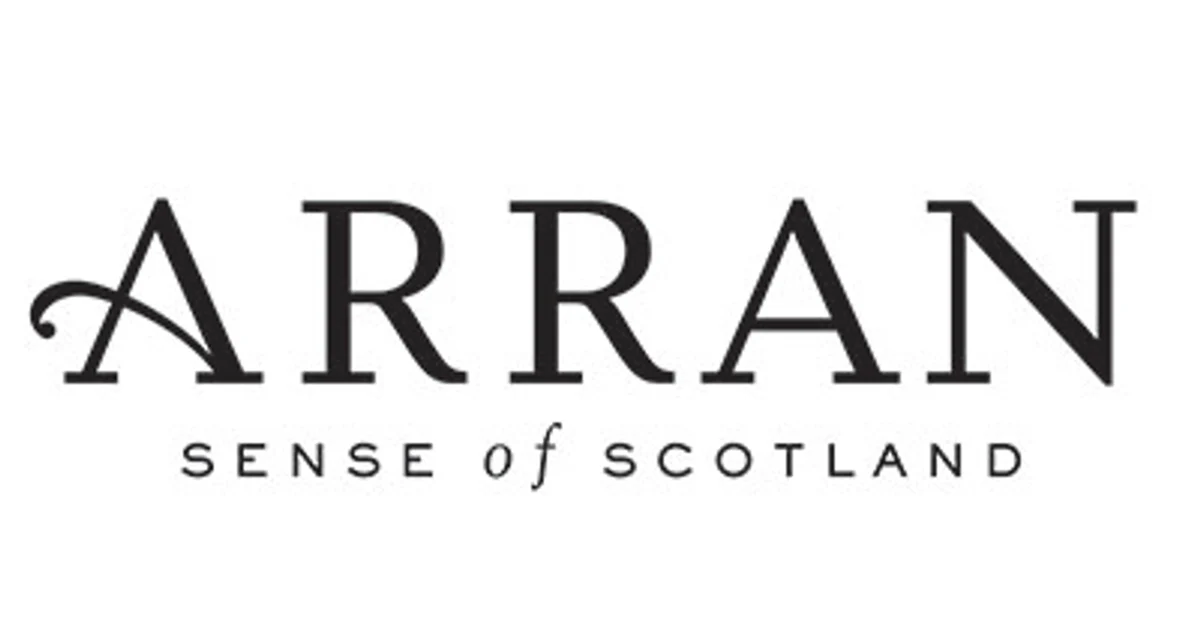
- Current logo (2016–present)
- Type: Public limited company
- Industry: Retail
- Predecessor: Arran Aromatics (1989–2016) (Note: The company was founded as Arran Aromatics and was re–branded as Arran, Sense of Scotland in 2016)
- Founded: 1989; 37 years ago in Lamlash, Scotland
- Founder: Janet Russell
- Headquarters: Brodick, Isle of Arran, Scotland
- Area served: Worldwide
- Key people: Kevin Meechan (CEO & Director)
- Products: Skin care, perfume, aftershave, fragrance
- Number of employees: 59 (2025)
- Website: arran.com

Arran, Sense of Scotland Plc., formerly Arran Aromatics, is a Scottish cosmetics and fragrance company founded in 1989 by Janet Russell. The companies factory in Lamlash on the Isle of Arran was officially opened on 27 September 1989.

== History ==
The company was established in 1989 as Arran Aromatics by beauty and skincare enthusiast Janet Russell in an attempt to develop scented bath & body products using the water which surrounds the Isle of Arran on the west coast of Scotland. By September, the company had developed their first production facility in Lamlash on the Isle of Arran, and was formally opened by HRH Princess Diana on 27 September who was accompanied by co–founder, Ian Russell. By 1992, the company launched their first product known as Apothecary Collection, before launching their After the Rain collection in 1999.

In 2016, the company officially changed its name from Arran Aromatics to Arran Sense of Scotland in an attempt to create a stronger marketing link to the Isle of Arran. The following year, the company launched its online website to boost customer sales due to the company "carefully selecting" its vendors, claiming that the company "only align ourselves with likeminded companies who value quality and wellbeing". In 2019, the company launched its first mens collection of beauty products. In 2024, the company had an estimated annual revenue of £7 million.

The company was placed in administration in 2017 with debts of £1.8 million. It was later acquired by private equity investor Endless LLP in 2017. At the time of being placed in administration, the company was owed money by several hotel and hospitality chains, including Trump Turnberry owned by Donald Trump who at that time was serving his first term as President of the United States. Others include high street retailers John Lewis and House of Fraser, as well as Royal Troon Golf Club. KPGM were appointed as administrators, and estimated that the company was owed roughly £182,436 by the organisations and businesses it was trading with at that time. As part of the acquisition, Endless LLP appointed the former head of Molton Brown to lead the business. The company returned to family ownership in 2025 with founding family members Andrew and Duncan Russell. Kevin Meechan remained as the companies Chief Executive Officer (CEO) and Chairman.

== Operation ==
The company sells its products primarily through independent stockists, with over 170 across Scotland, and over 50 in England and Wales. The company also provides services to the hospitality sector, and has been in partnership with the Caledonian Sleeper train to provide cosmetic products since 2015.

== Products ==
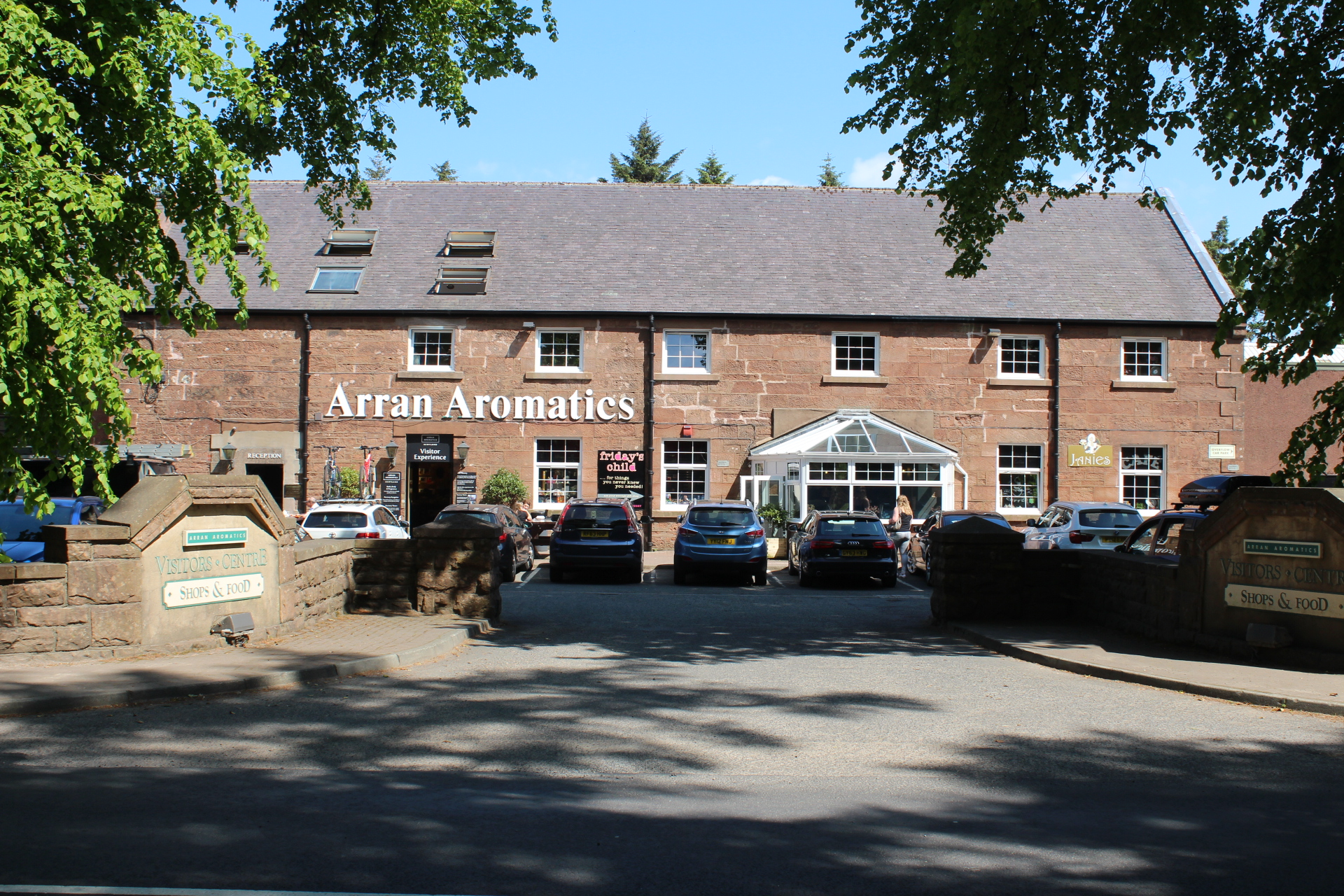
Arran, Sense of Scotland in former Arran Aromatics branding in Brodick

Arran, Sense of Scotland launched their first product range in 1992, known as the Apothecary Collection. Their After the Rain collection was launched in 1999, followed by Citrus Shores in 2010. In 2019, the company launched their first dedicated mens collection in attempt to distance themselves from their founding principle of exploring cosmetics products primarily aimed at the female market. In 2022, they launched the Naturals Collection which is 100% natural fragrance, cruelty free & Vegan friendly in an attempt to reach a younger market target audience. As of 2025, the company uses 100% post-consumer recycled materials for its packaging, while its online warehouse is fully carbon neutral.

The company has a flagship store on George Street in Edinburgh, as well as an outlet in Buchanan Galleries in Glasgow.

- Apothecary Collection (1992–present)
- After the Rain (1999–present)
- Citrus Shores (2010–2016)
- Glenashdale (2016–present)
- Lochranza (2019–present)
- Machrie (2019–present)
- Naturals Collection (2022–present)
- Sannox (2023–present)
