= Whiting Bay =

Coordinates: 55.485°N 5.094°W

Whiting Bay: Scottish Gaelic: Eadar Dhà Rubha
- Village
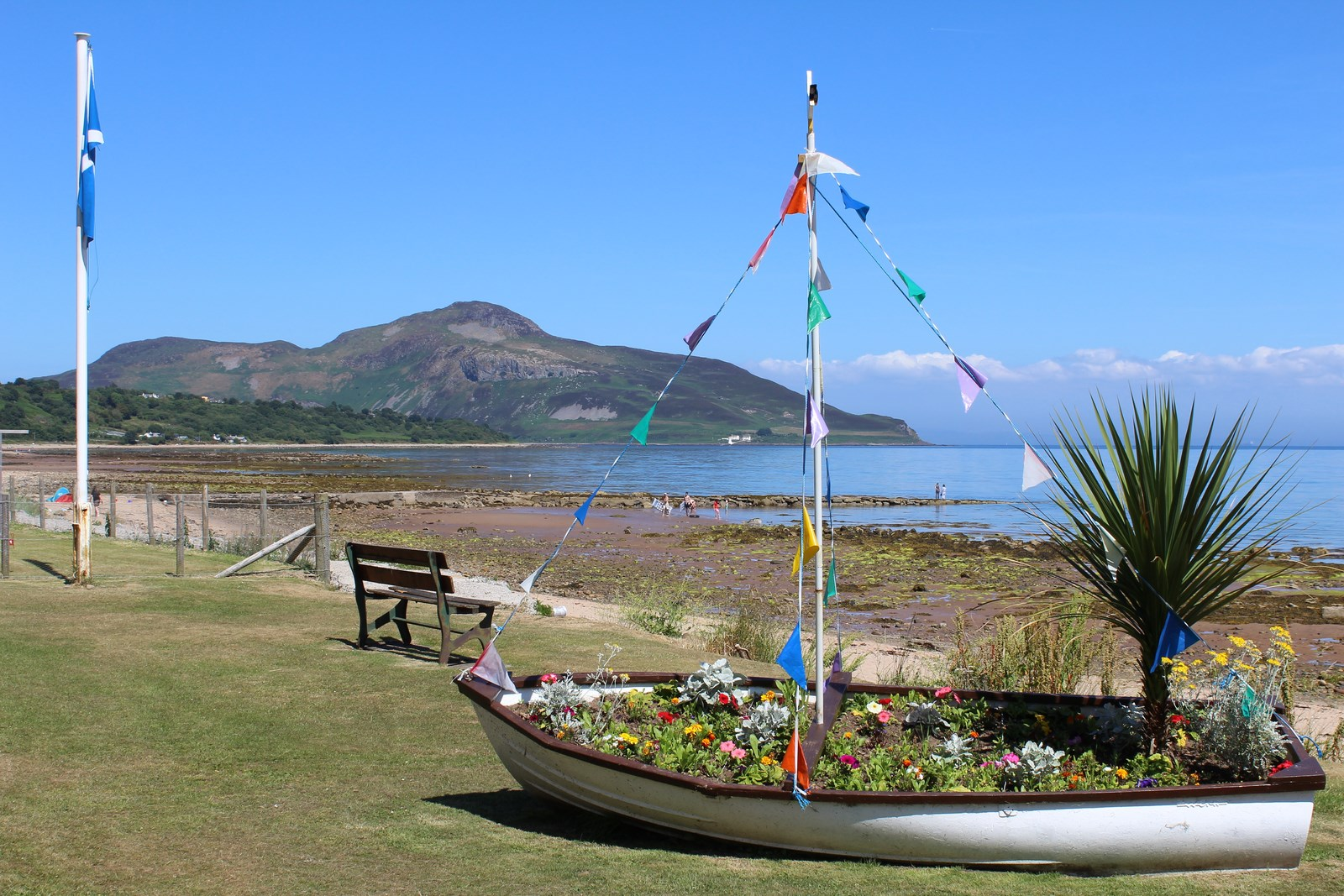
- Floral display and beach, Whiting Bay, looking across to Holy Island

- Location within North Ayrshire
- Population: 650 (2020)
- OS grid reference: NS045255
- Civil parish: Kilbride
- Council area: North Ayrshire
- Lieutenancy area: Ayrshire and Arran
- Country: Scotland
- Sovereign state: United Kingdom
- Post town: ISLE OF ARRAN
- Postcode district: KA27
- Dialling code: 01770
- Police: Scotland
- Fire: Scottish
- Ambulance: Scottish
- UK Parliament: North Ayrshire and Arran
- Scottish Parliament: Cunninghame North

Whiting Bay (Scottish Gaelic: Eadar Dhà Rubha, "between two headlands") is a village located on the Isle of Arran in the Firth of Clyde, Scotland four miles (six kilometres) south of Lamlash and eight miles (thirteen kilometres) south of Brodick. With more than 600 inhabitants it's the third largest village on the island of Arran, behind Lamlash and Brodick.

It is called after the bay near the southern end of Arran's east coast that the settlement sits on.

== History ==
Originally Whiting Bay consisted of a group of small settlements situated on the coast or just inland from it. The names of these hamlets are still extant and are given to the separate "districts" which the small relatively small village of Whiting Bay is split up into. The most northerly is Kingscross, south of there is Auchencairn, then Kockenkelly, North Kiscadale, South Kiscadale and then the most southerly is Largymore. These settlements have an ancient origin, the hillside inland from Largymore there is a prehistoric burial site called the Giants Graves. At Kingscross Point, at the opposite end of the village, there is a dun or fortified farmstead dating back almost two thousand years. The Vikings settled at Kingscross and had a burial site there, and has led to suggestions that the Bay and the Village were named after them as "Viking Bay" and that this was later corrupted to Whiting Bay. Kingscross is also noted as the site where Robert the Bruce embarked for Ayrshire in February 1307, on his way to regaining control of his kingdom from the English. When these were excavated the archaeologist responsible discovered two settings of stones which were six feet (1.8 metres) apart, and positioned approximately two feet (60 centimetres) above the centre of the mound. Within the mound they found a pile of articles which consisted of human bones which had been affected by heat, fragments of whalebone which were decorated with a design of concentric circles, charcoal, lumps of iron, among which were Viking boat rivets, bronze pieces, two pieces of vitrified stone and a bronze coin, identified as a styca of Wigmund, the Archbishop of York between 831 and 854 C.E.

When a ferry was set up between the town of Saltcoats in Ayrshire and Arran in 1790 this led to the merging of the five settlements into the village of Whiting Bay. The steamers from Glasgow and elsewhere in the Clyde Estuary began to call in at Whiting Bay in the 1830s. When the inland crofting areas of Arran underwent clearances from the 1830s this led to an increased demand for accommodation on the coast. Of all of the villages on Arran, Whiting Bay appears to have been attractive to a more well-heeled clientele. These more genteel arrivals had a succession of fine villas built along the inland side of the road running along the bay. A golf course was constructed in 1895, along with tennis courts, a bowling club and a putting green. A new pier was finished in 1901 and this enabled steamers to disembark passengers directly into Whiting Bay rather than ferrying them to shore in "flit boats", and this reinforced the village's increase in size. The Whiting Bay village hall was added in 1926. There was a youth hostel in Whiting Bay but this closed in the early 21st century and sold off.

== Present ==
In the late 1950s the steamer services to Arran from the mainland stopped calling in at Whiting Bay and the service changed to a car ferry calling only at Brodick from 1957. This led to the fortunes of Whiting Bay waning and the venerable steamer pier shut in the early 1960s. The village still has a modest pier in the centre of the village, close to a line of tiny shops backing onto the sea. Many of the grander villas have been converted into tourist amenities such as hotels, guesthouses and restaurants and the village has a large proportion of such accommodation on the island. The Whiting Bay Golf Club continues to operate, as does the putting green. The village also has a primary school, a doctors' surgery and a number of businesses catering for visitors such as an art gallery. In the 2011 Census the population of Whiting Bay was 620.

== Notable sites ==
The basic character of the village is formed by settlement along the coastal road, with a line late of Victorian villas in the northern part of the village which were built as boarding houses.

=== Glenashdale Falls ===
Eas a' Chrannaig also known as the Glenashdale Falls is formed of a series of falls on the Glenashdale Burn, which flows from moorland near the summit of Tighvein eastwards towards Whiting Bay, from which there is a tourist trail leading some 4 kilometres (2.5 mi) up Glenashdale.The falls are set in managed woodland with a viewing platform.

There is a small Iron Age fort nearby which would originally have had one or more circular houses inside defended by the outer wall.

=== Giants' Graves ===
Known locally as the Giants Graves, this site contains the remains of two "Clyde Type" Neolithic chambered tombs. The remains of a further chambered cairn known as Torr an Loisgte are nearby.

=== Kings Cross Iron Age fort ===
At the north end of Whiting Bay towards Lamlash. The remains of an Iron Age fort can be seen near the end of the spit of land known as Kings Cross Point, along with the shallow imprint where a Viking ship burial was excavated in the 19th century.

=== Churches ===
- St Margaret's (Scottish Episcopal Church) was built in 1960 and is at the north end of the village
- St Donan's (Church of Scotland) built in 1910 of red-harled brick with red sandstone margins
- St Columbas (former Church of Scotland) 1873 and designed by Thomas Wallace of Ardrossan in Simple Gothic style
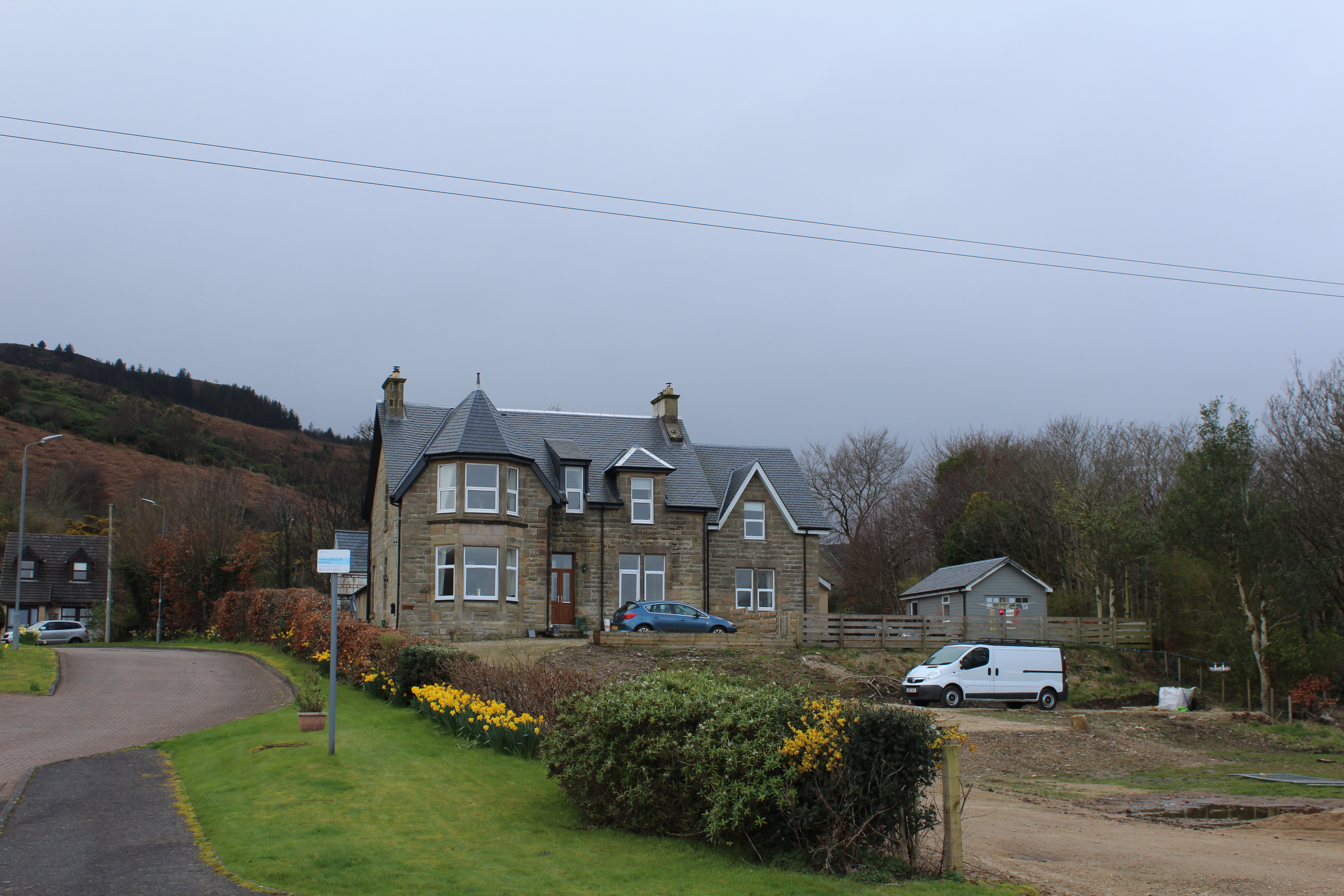
Former Whiting Bay Youth Hostel

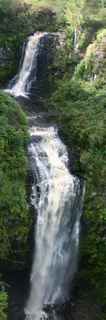
Glenashdale Falls

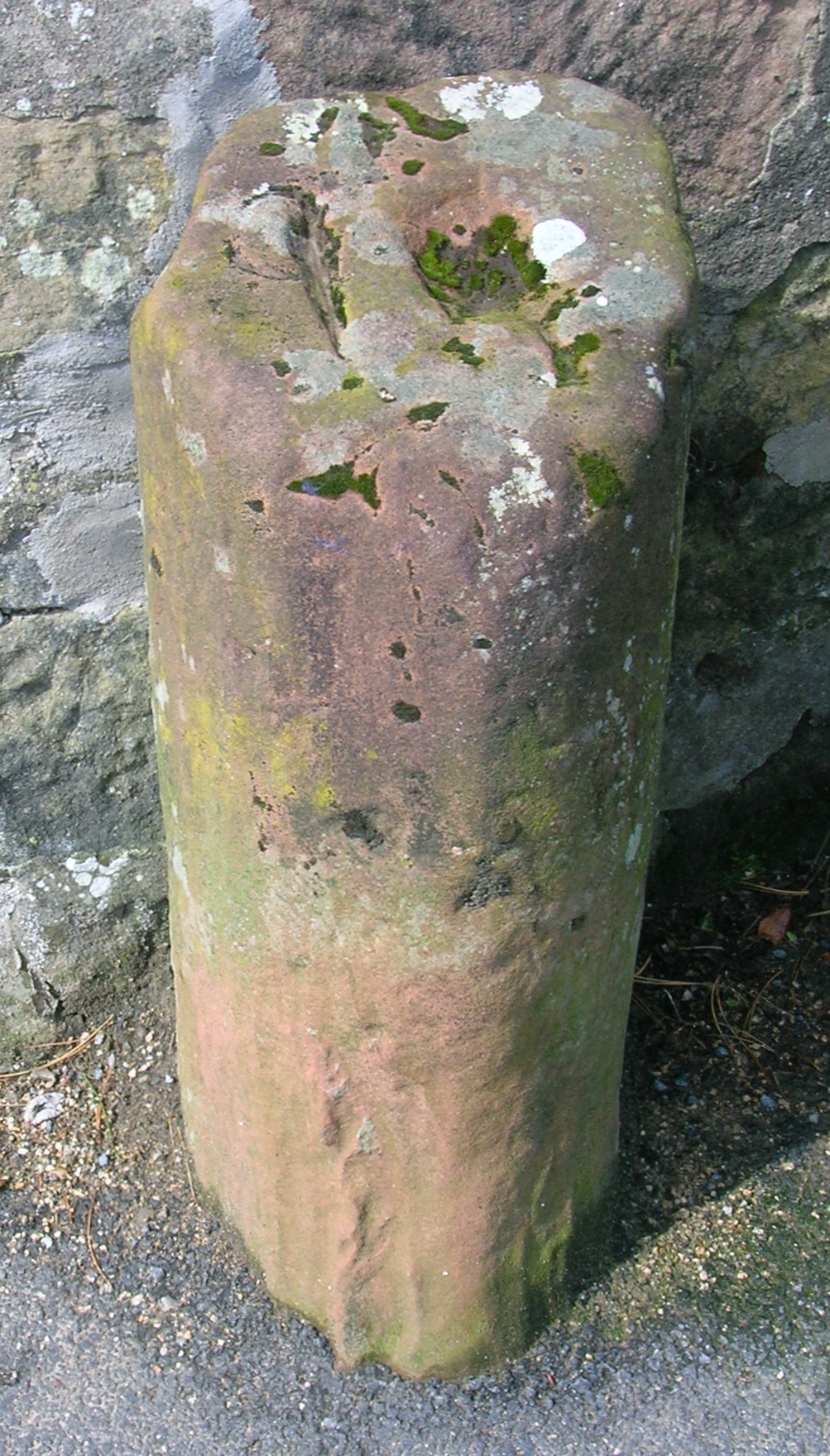
Old milestone in Whiting Bay.

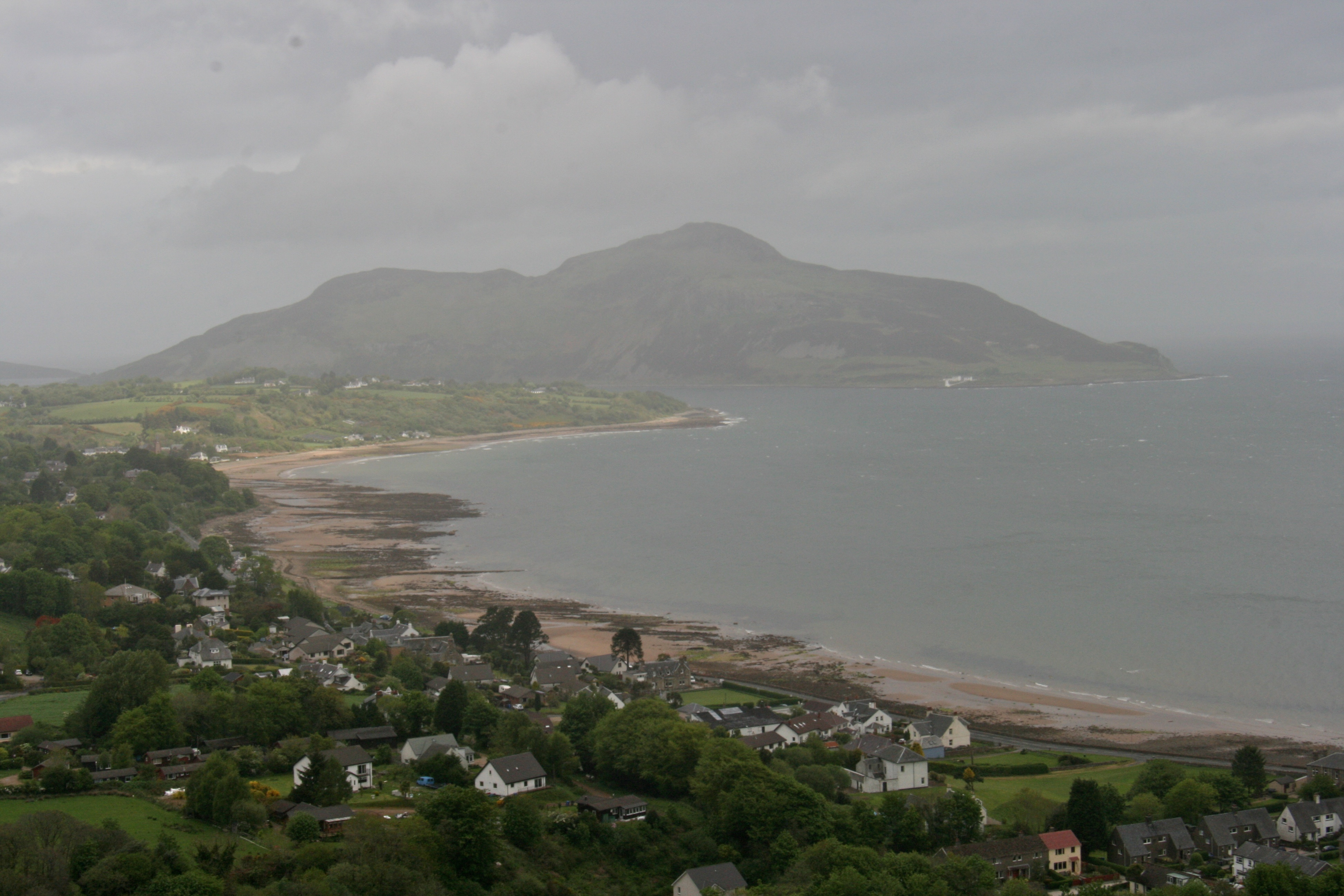
Whiting Bay, Arran
