= Beinn Tarsuinn (Corbett) =

Mountain on the Isle of Arran, Scotland

Coordinates: 55°37′19″N 5°14′31″W

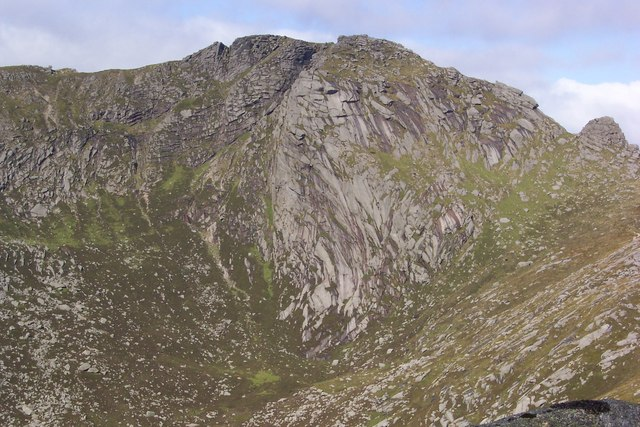
- From Goat Fell to the east

Highest point
- Elevation: 826 m (2,710 ft)
- Prominence: 235 m (771 ft)
- Parent peak: Caisteal Abhail
- Listing: Corbett, Marilyn

Naming
- English translation: transverse hill
- Language of name: Gaelic

Geography
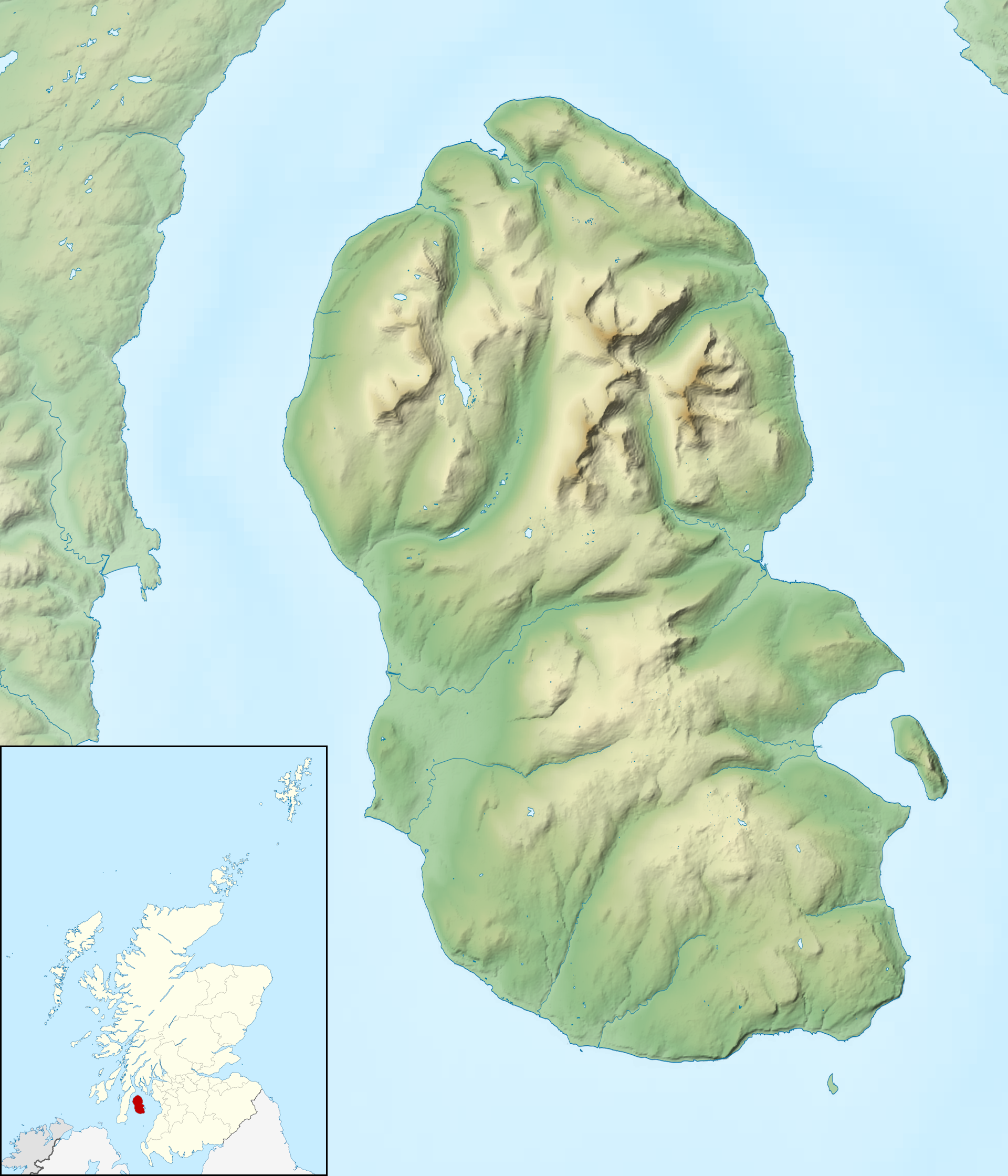
- Location within Arran
- Location: Isle of Arran, North Ayrshire, Scotland
- OS grid: NR959412
- Topo map: OS Landranger 69

Beinn Tarsuinn is a mountain on the Isle of Arran, Scotland. It is the southernmost of the four Corbetts on the island, lying between Glen Rosa to the east and Glen Iorsa to the west.

Beinn Tarsuinn is often climbed in conjunction with the neighbouring peak of Cìr Mhòr, to which it is linked by a rocky ridge forming the subsidiary top of A' Chìr. The crossing of A' Chìr involves scrambling, however the two peaks can be linked without crossing A' Chìr by means of a path that traverse the ridge's western side. The simplest and shortest route up Beinn Tarsuinn is via one of the two ridges on either side of the Coire a' Bhradain; both ridges drop down into Glen Rosa, the usual access for most walkers to this group of hills.
