= Creag Ghlas Laggan =

Coordinates: 55°41′56″N 5°13′12″W

- Fionn Bhealach
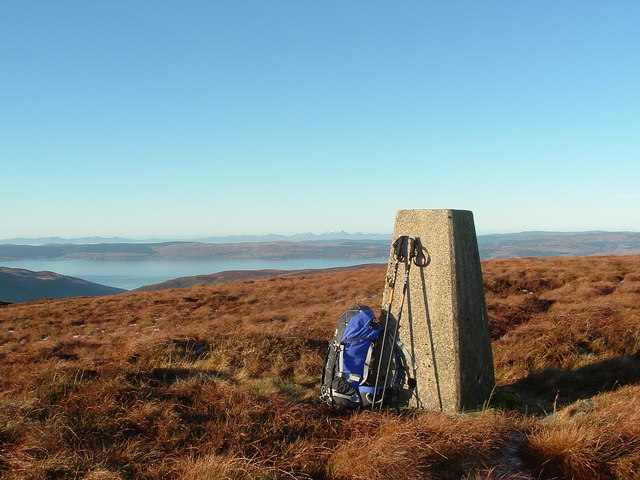
- View towards Jura from the summit

Highest point
- Elevation: 444 m (1,457 ft)
- Prominence: 241 m (791 ft)
- Parent peak: Caisteal Abhail
- Listing: Marilyn

Naming
- Language of name: Gaelic

Geography
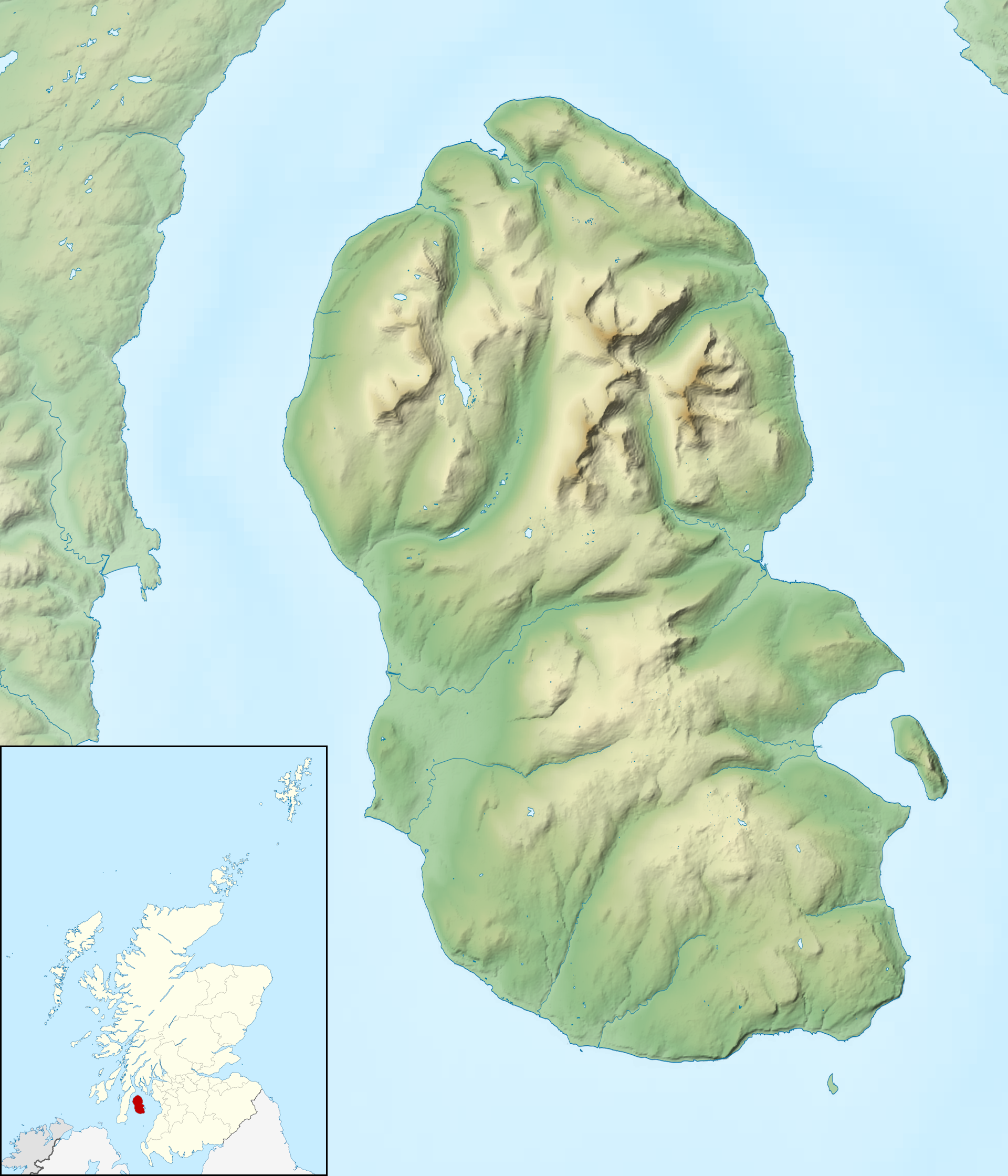
- Location within Arran
- Location: Isle of Arran, North Ayrshire, Scotland
- OS grid: NR977497
- Topo map: OS Landranger 69

Creag Ghlas Laggan (also known as Fionn Bhealach) is a hill on the Isle of Arran in south-western Scotland. It is the highest point of the seven-mile-long ridge of land that runs north-west to south-east between the A841 road and the Sound of Bute in the north-eastern part of the island. It is classed as a Marilyn (a hill with topographic prominence of at least 150 metres or 490 feet).

The best way up in terms of scenery is to follow the well-trodden and easily graded path from Lochranza to Bearradh Tom a' Muidhe at grid ref 962508, and strike south-east up the ridge from there. The shortest way up is a straight line from the parking area at Boguillie at grid ref 973483.

The hill has a remarkable variety of geology. On its north-western slopes is the famous Hutton's Unconformity in the Dalradian metasediments. On the north-east shore can be found Carboniferous limestone and Permian desert deposits. At the southeastern end is some Devonian Old Red Sandstone.

Creag Ghlas Laggan has views towards Caisteal Abhail and the other peaks such as Goat Fell.
