= Sleeping Warrior =

Viewpoint in Scotland

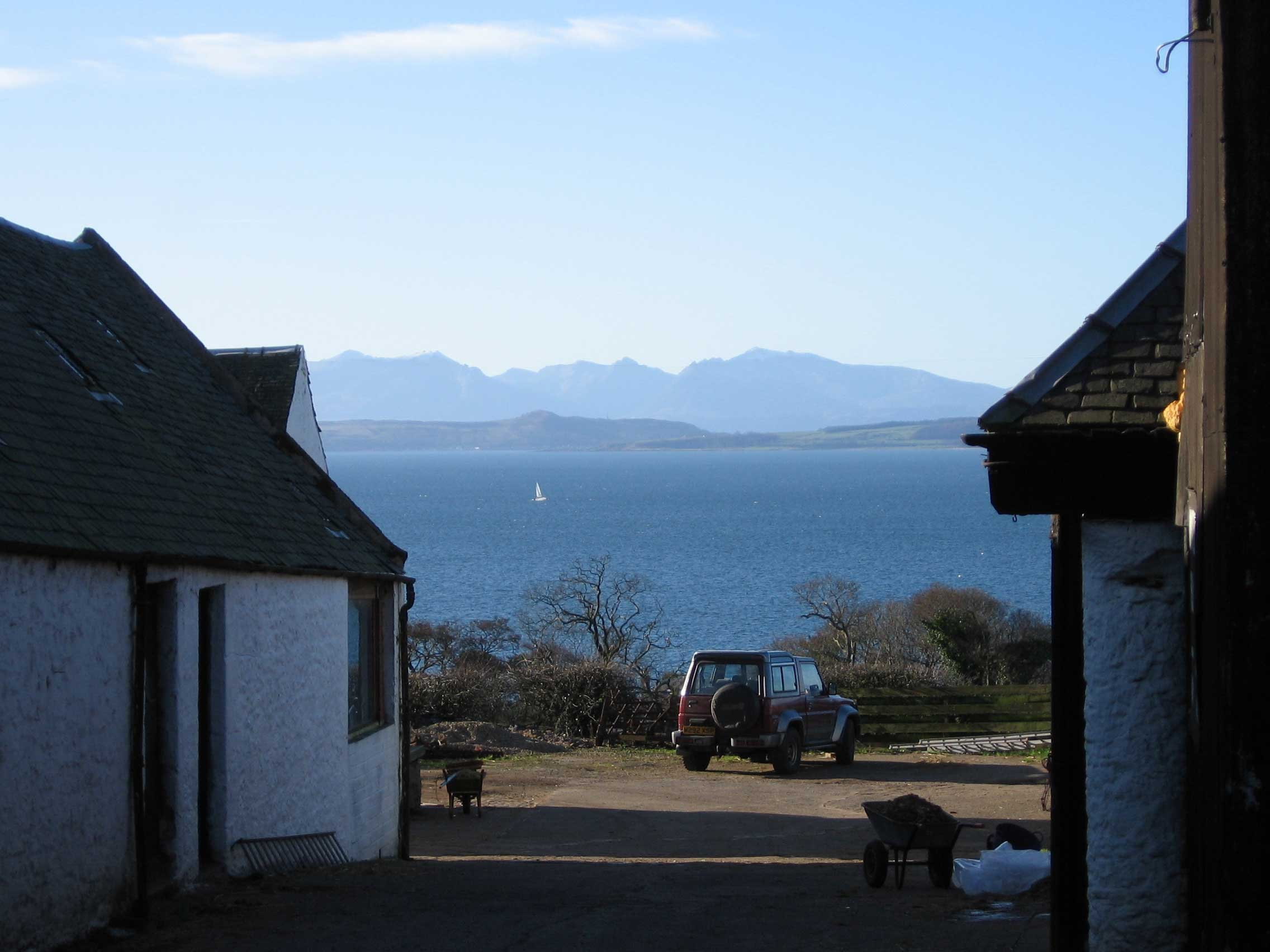
North Arran seen from North Ayrshire, about 3 miles (5 kilometres) north of Largs. The view south over the Firth of Clyde shows the southern tip of Bute and in the background the peaks of (from left to right) Goat Fell, Beinn Tarsuinn and Caisteal Abhail. The Sleeping Warrior's profile is at right.

The Sleeping Warrior is the profile of the north Arran hills in Scotland as seen from the Ayrshire coast. It is a well-known site that takes its name from a resemblance to a resting human figure. Various interpretations of the profile exist although the view of the Witches Step and Caisteal Abhail from North Ayrshire and Bute is arguably the most convincing.

== Interpretations ==
Although the idea is well known, the specific hills involved are variously described. Keay & Keay refer to "the profile of the 'Sleeping Warrior' of Arran as seen from the Clyde Coast", suggesting that several hills are included. However, various websites claim the phrase refers to single hills, none of which individually resemble a reclining human figure, or to different parts of the north Arran range.

One interpretation is that all the hills north of Brodick on the island of Arran's coast are profiled, including Goat Fell, Caisteal Abhail and Cìr Mhòr. However, as other sources confirm, the Warrior does not include Goat Fell. High Spicer, for example writes: "And in broken weather the clouds would lie like a dingy blanket upon the heights until the wind blew them over, or the sun pierced them, and revealed the spire of Goatfell or the majestic figure of the Sleeping Warrior."

Caisteal Abhail and the Witches Step are most often claimed as resembling the Sleeping Warrior when viewed from roughly northern directions.

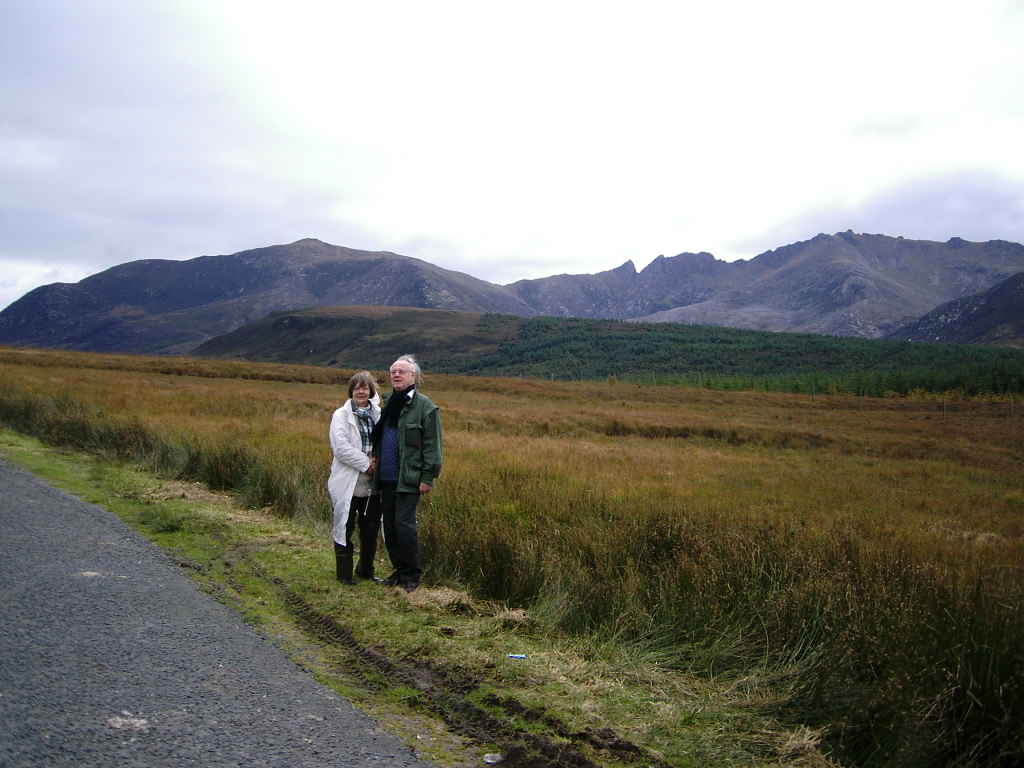
The Witches Step (helmeted head) and Caisteal Abhail (belly) from the north, with Suidhe Fhearghas at left (not part of Warrior)

Claims are sometimes made for other views such as A' Chìr ridge (between Cìr Mhòr and Beinn Tarsuinn), that clearly suggests a humanoid head and shoulders (although no torso) or the rather less-compelling Beinn Nuis and Beinn Tarsuinn ridges, that are not visible from the Ayrshire coast.

However, as the view from St Ninian's Bay on Bute indicates the full profile begins with the Witches Step "face", includes Caisteal Abhail as the folded arms and continues along the ridge towards Meall Mòr in the direction of Lochranza and Catacol. This profile is visible from the direction of the North Ayrshire coast all the way round to Argyll and north Kintyre.
