= A841 road =

Road in North Ayrshire, Scotland

A841

Route information
- Length: 22.8 mi (36.7 km)

Location
- Country: United Kingdom

Road network
- Roads in the United Kingdom; Motorways; A and B road zones

The A841 road is the only A-road on the Isle of Arran and forms the island's primary transport route. Until 2009, the road circumnavigated the island around a 55-mile route. However, in 2009 the section between Dippen, just south of Whiting Bay and Lochranza via Blackwaterfoot was downgraded, leaving a truncated A841 to run between Whiting Bay and Lochranza via Brodick. At only one point does it venture inland, and this is to climb the 600-foot (180-metre) pass at Boguillie between Creag Ghlas Laggan and Caisteal Abhail in the north east of the island.

Leaving Dippen, the road heads north through Whiting Bay. It passes through the island capital Lamlash before venturing over the hill to Brodick. At the west end of Brodick, the road turns sharply right at a junction with the B880 to Blackwaterfoot, and heads north towards Corrie and Sannox. The road hugs the coastline until Sannox, where it heads inland through North Glen Sannox, before descending into Lochranza, ending at the pier where Caledonian MacBrayne services to Claonaig (in summer) and Tarbert, Kintyre (in winter). The C147 then proceeds down the west coast of the island and around the south to Dippen.
