= Morro Peak =

Mountain in Alberta, Canada

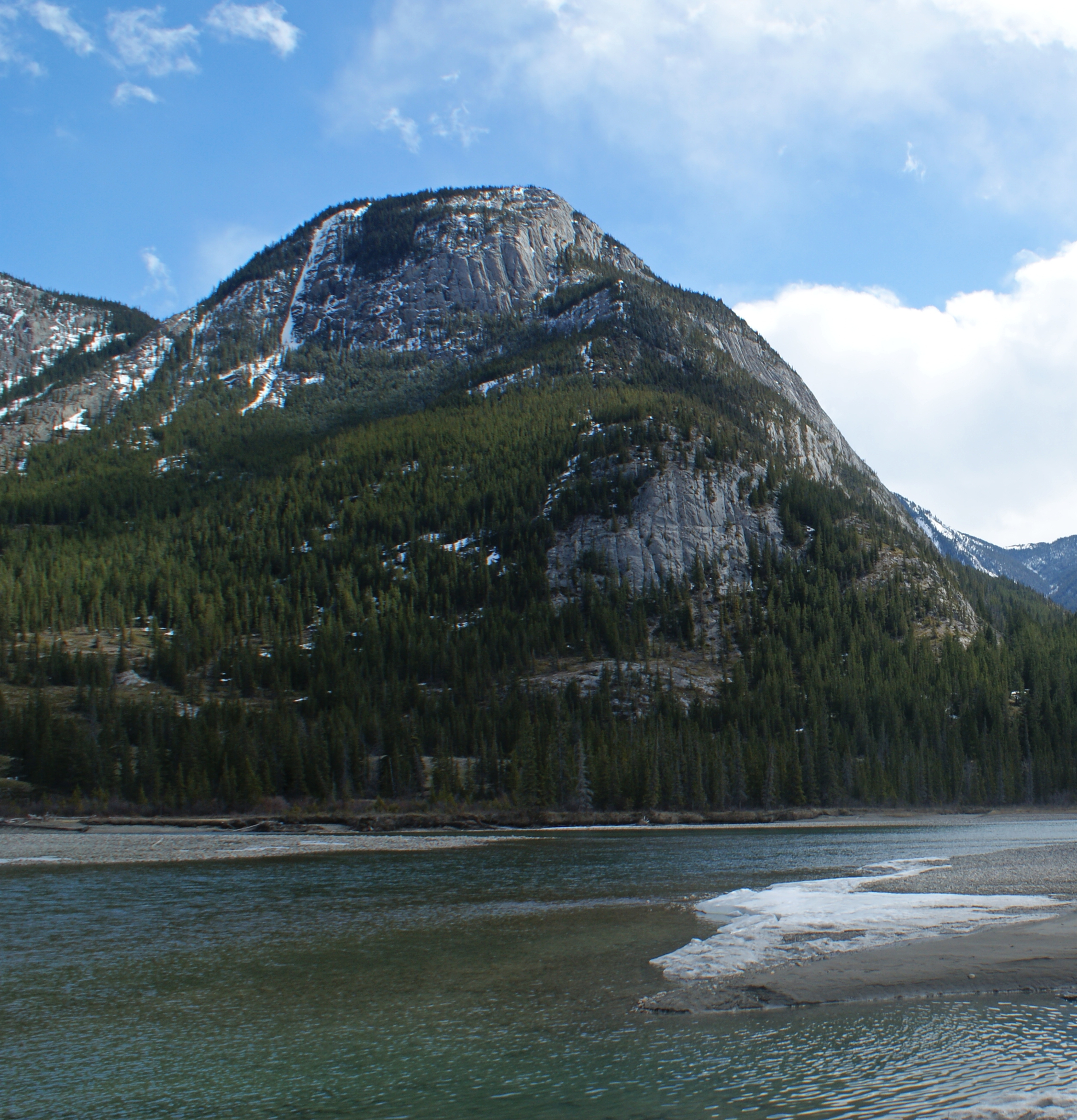
- Morro Peak and Athabasca River

Highest point
- Elevation: 1,679 m (5,509 ft)
- Prominence: 109 m (358 ft)
- Parent peak: Hawk Mountain (2553 m)
- Listing: Mountains of Alberta
- Coordinates: 53°02′00″N 118°04′04″W

Geography
- Location within Alberta Location within Canada
- Country: Canada
- Province: Alberta
- Protected area: Jasper National Park
- Parent range: Colin Range; Canadian Rockies
- Topo map: NTS 83E1 Snaring River

Geology
- Rock type: limestone

Morro Peak is a small 1,679-metre (5,509-foot) mountain summit located in Jasper National Park in Alberta, Canada. It is located at the northwest end of the Colin Range, which is a sub-range of the Canadian Rockies. The peak is situated 17 km (11 mi) north of the municipality of Jasper, and is a prominent landmark in the Athabasca Valley visible from Highway 16 and the Canadian. The nearest higher peak is Hawk Mountain, 4.0 km (2.5 mi) to the southeast. Morro Peak was named in 1916 by Morrison P. Bridgland for the Spanish word morro, meaning rounded hill, which is an apt description of it. Bridgland (1878-1948) was a Dominion Land Surveyor who named many peaks in Jasper Park and the Canadian Rockies. The mountain's name was officially adopted in 1956 by the Geographical Names Board of Canada.

== Climate ==
Based on the Köppen climate classification, Morro Peak is located in a subarctic climate zone with cold, snowy winters, and mild summers. Winter temperatures can drop below -20 °C with wind chill factors below -30 °C. In terms of favorable weather, June through September are the best months to climb. Precipitation runoff from Morro Peak flows into the Athabasca River.

== Gallery ==
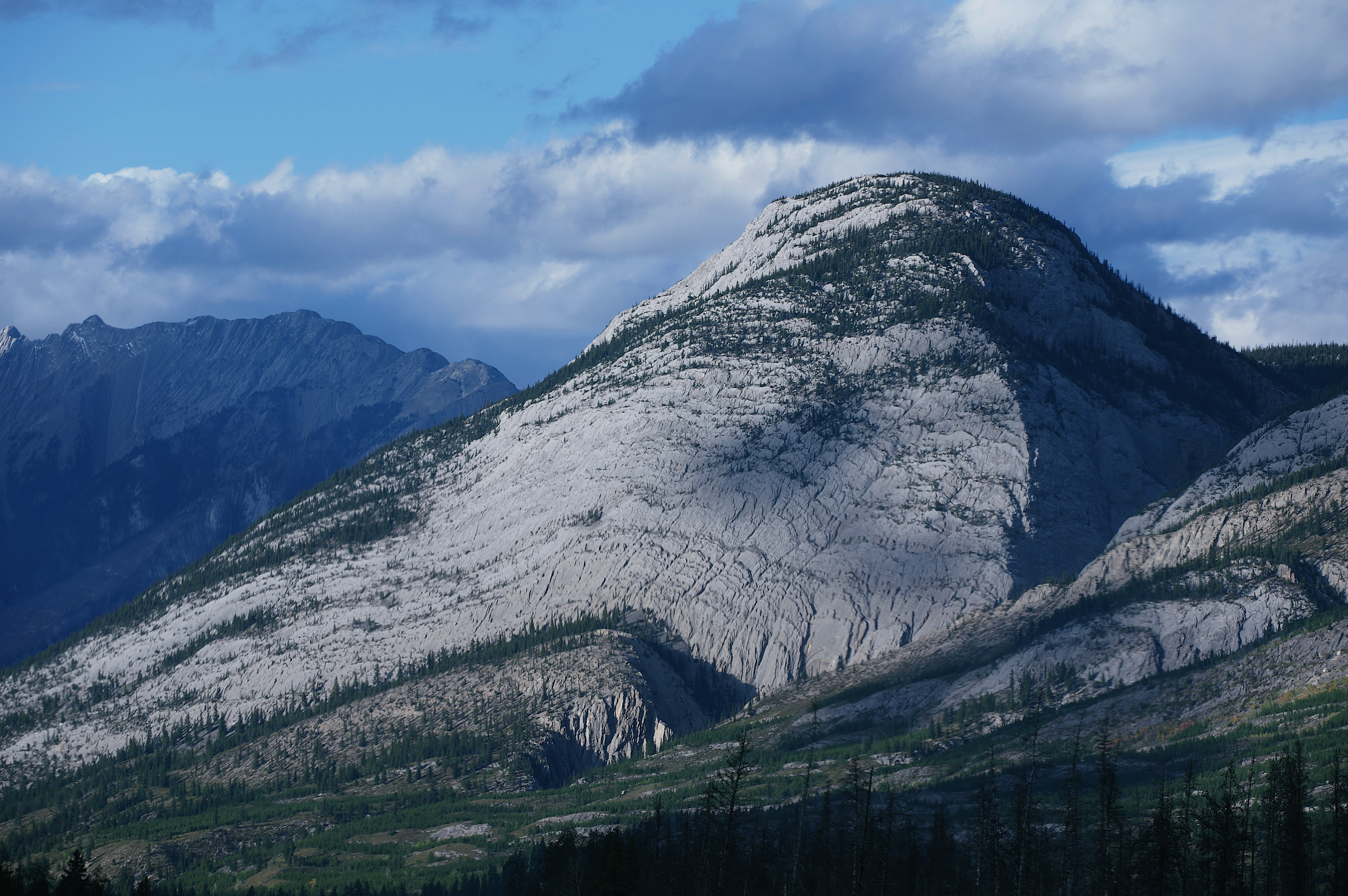
Morro Peak, south aspect

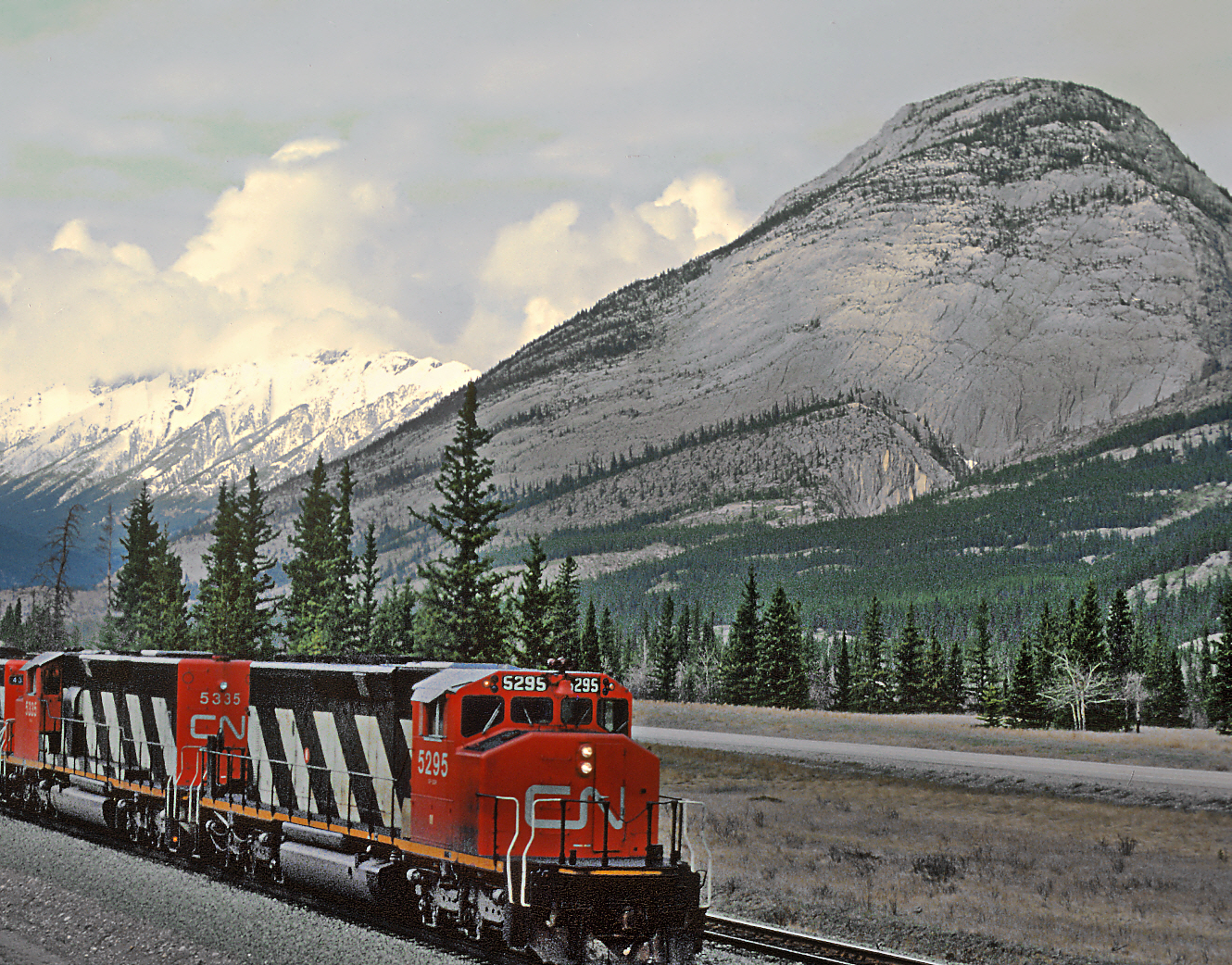
Morro Peak to the right

== See also ==
- Geography of Alberta
