= List of rock formations that resemble human beings =

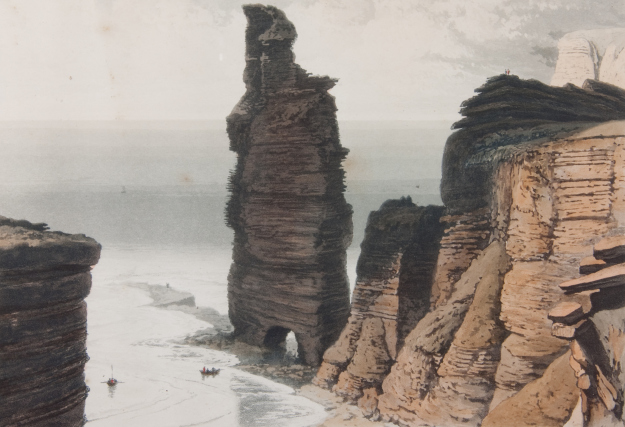
The Old Man of Hoy in 1817, when it had two legs

A list of rock formations worldwide that resemble human beings.

== Brazil ==
- Pedra da Gávea is a mountain in Rio de Janeiro whose resemblance to a human head sparked several pseudoarchaeological theories over the years (see Archaeological interest of Pedra da Gávea).

== Canada ==
- Sleeping Giant, Thunder Bay, Ontario
- Roche Bonhomme, Jasper National Park, Alberta

== Israel ==
- "Lot's Wife", a pillar of salt near the Dead Sea at Mount Sodom

== Jordan ==
- Lot's Wife, another pillar of salt with this name, also near the Dead Sea, not far from the ruins of the Byzantine Monastery of St Lot

== Poland ==
- Giewont, a mountain whose shape resembles a lying human, associated with a legend of the sleeping knight

== United Kingdom ==
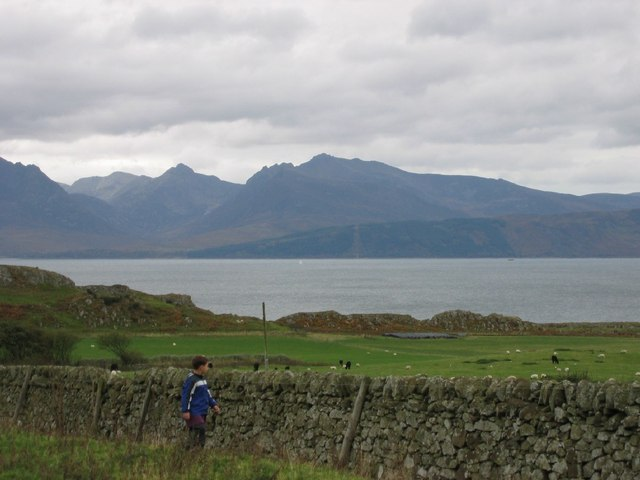
The Sleeping Warrior — the profile of Arran, here seen from Bute

- The Old Man of Hoy in Orkney is a rock pillar that from certain angles is said to resemble a standing man.
- Queen Victoria's Rock on the Isle of Barra is a rock formation near Northbay on the north side of the A888, looking toward the west, which resembles the profile of the elderly Queen Victoria.
- The Winking Man Rock formation (also known as the Winking Eye) is part of the Ramshaw Rocks section of The Roaches. It looks like a face sticking out of the hillside, and as you travel past in a car towards Buxton the 'eye' appears to wink, as a pinnacle of rock passes behind the face as a consequence of parallax. A public house near Ramshaw Rocks at Upper Hulme takes its name from the Winking Man rock.
- The Sleeping Warrior is the profile of the peaks of the island of Arran.

== United States ==
- Old Man of the Mountain, Franconia, New Hampshire
- Sleeping Giant, Hamden, Connecticut
- The Indian Head, Lincoln, New Hampshire
- Profile Rock, Massachusetts
- Sleeping Giant, Steamboat Springs, Colorado
- Ute Mountain, Colorado
- Lincoln Rock, Washington

== See also ==
- Breast-shaped hill
- List of individual rocks
- List of rock formations
