= Torr Meadhonach =

Coordinates: 55°42′49″N 5°15′21″W

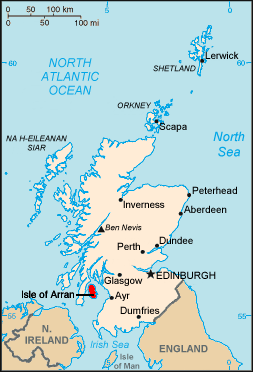
Location in Scotland

Torr Meadhonach is a hill 332 metres (1,089 ft) high at the northernmost part of the Isle of Arran in western Scotland, east of the village of Lochranza.

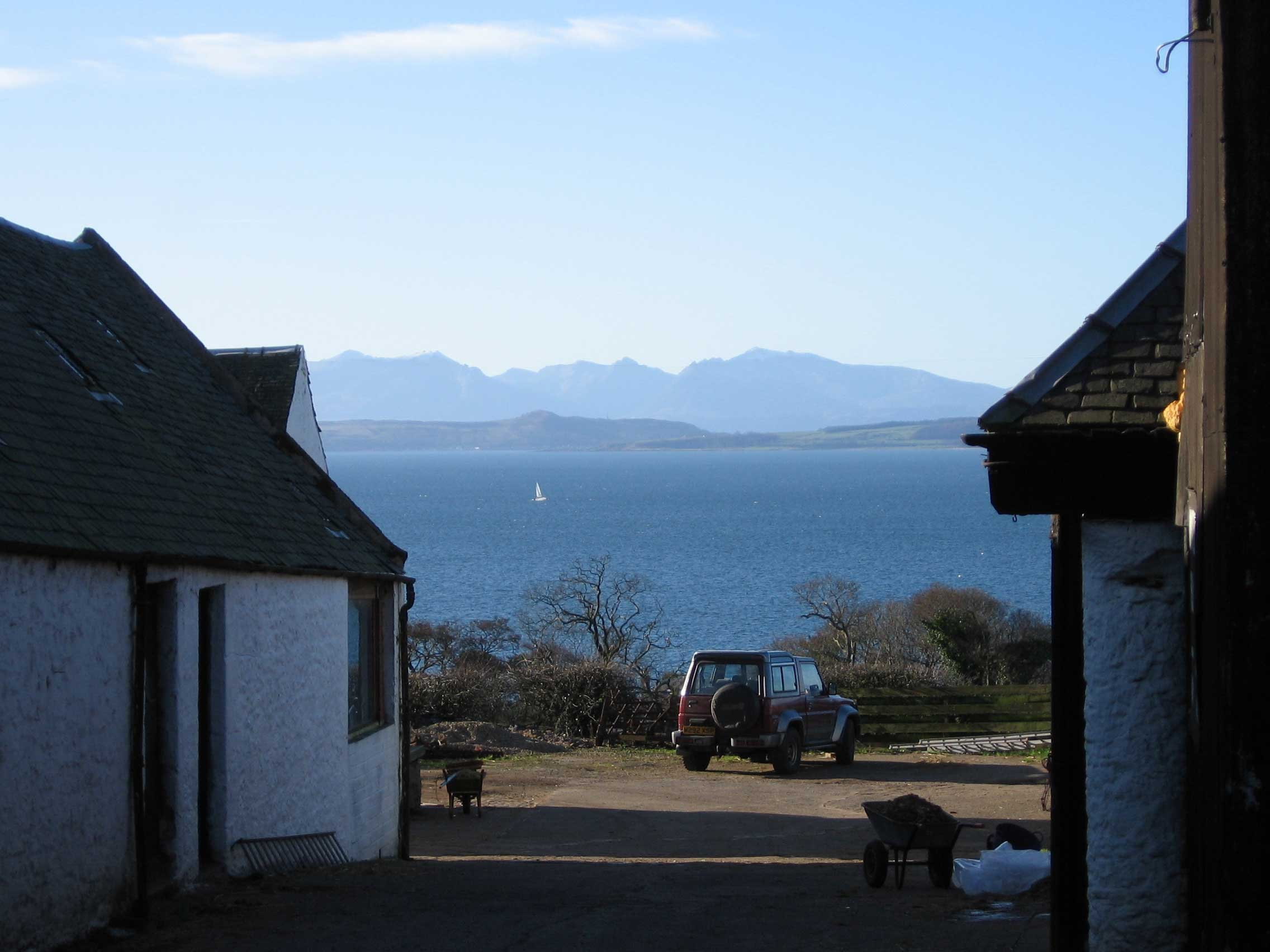
Torr Meadhonach over the Sound of Bute in the distance. Torr Meadhonach is in the middle distance, at right, with the summit adjacent to the house. The Sleeping Warrior is in the distance.
