= Corrie, Arran =

Coordinates: 55.643°N 5.139°W

Corrie: Scottish Gaelic: An Coire
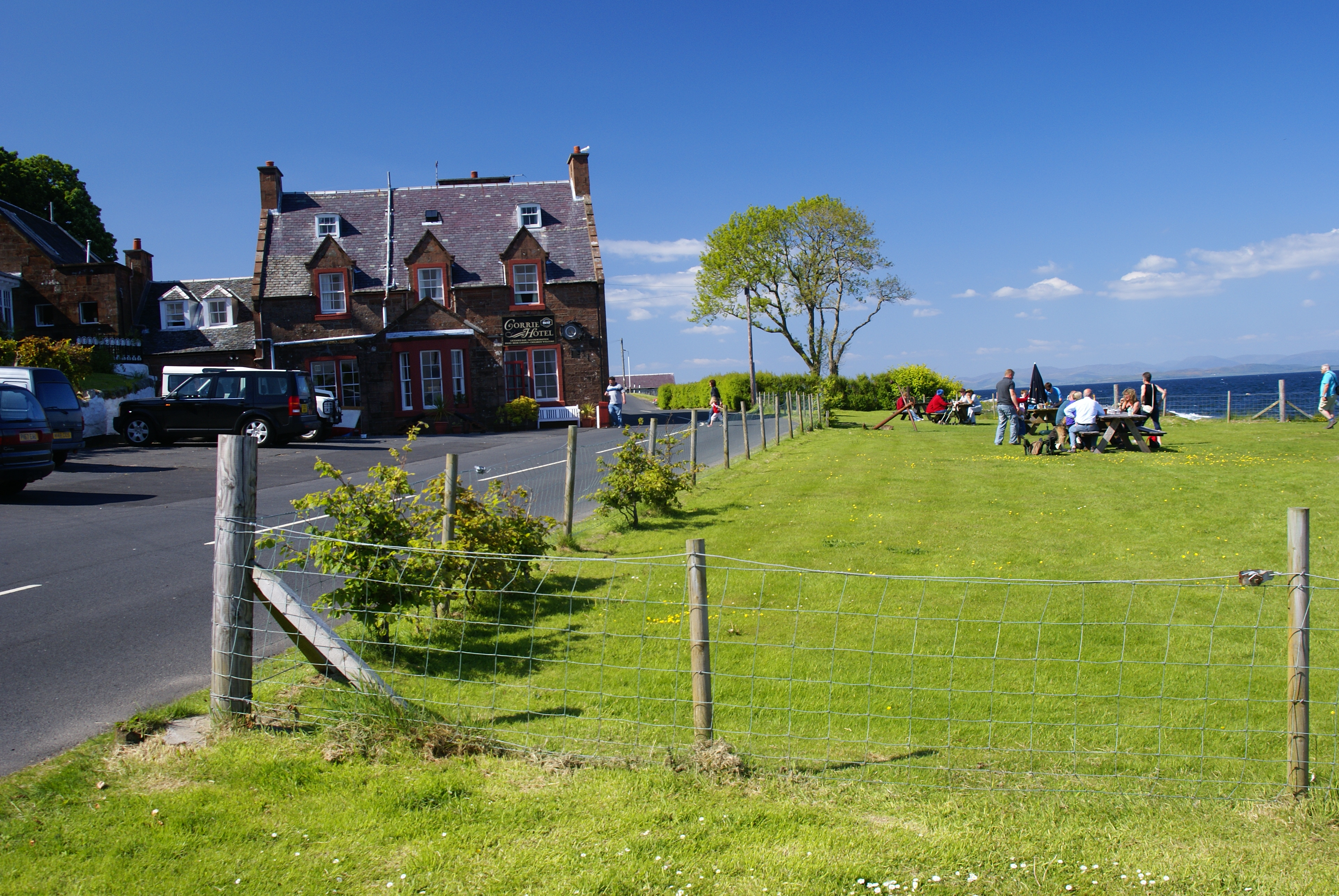
- Corrie Hotel and Beer Garden

- Location within North Ayrshire
- OS grid reference: NS024432
- Civil parish: Kilbride
- Council area: North Ayrshire
- Lieutenancy area: Ayrshire and Arran
- Country: Scotland
- Sovereign state: United Kingdom
- Post town: ISLE OF ARRAN
- Postcode district: KA27
- Dialling code: 01770
- Police: Scotland
- Fire: Scottish
- Ambulance: Scottish
- UK Parliament: North Ayrshire and Arran
- Scottish Parliament: Cunninghame North

Corrie (Scottish Gaelic: An Coire) is a village on the north east coast of the Isle of Arran in Scotland, 6 miles (10 kilometres) north of Brodick. It lies 2 mi (3 km) due east under the island's highest mountain, Goat Fell. A path from High Corrie 3/4 mi (1.2 km) to the south, provides access to the hillside. Corrie, and its northern neighbour, Sannox, lie approximately halfway between Brodick and Lochranza.

== History ==
The village used to be a regular stop for steamers circumnavigating the island, passengers embarking by way of a rowing boat from the "ferry rock". The ferry rock is located midway between the village's two quays. The southernmost quay is known as the "sandstone quay". This harbour and quay used to be the location where sandstone blocks from the nearby quarry were shipped to the mainland, and huge pieces of stone can still be seen. (Sandstone from Corrie was also used in the construction of Kirn & Sandbank Parish Church in Argyll and Bute.) The sheep bollards on the quay walls were moved to Corrie after they were used in the 1988 Glasgow Garden Festival. The northernmost quay is "Corrie port" and was also used for shipping products to other locations on the island, the mainland and other islands. Small coastal cargo vessels of a type known as the Clyde puffer were a common sight in the port and the sandstone quay during their heyday. There was also a limestone "mine" in the village, which has a roof lined with fossils of Gigantoproductus.

== Geography ==
Just to the north of Corrie's close neighbour, Sannox, the main A841 road leaves the shore and climbs north west over North Glen Sannox towards Lochranza. Corrie Golf Club is located here which was founded in 1892. This 9-hole, 3,896-yard (3,563-metre) hillside course offers magnificent views over the Firth of Clyde and the Arran mountains.

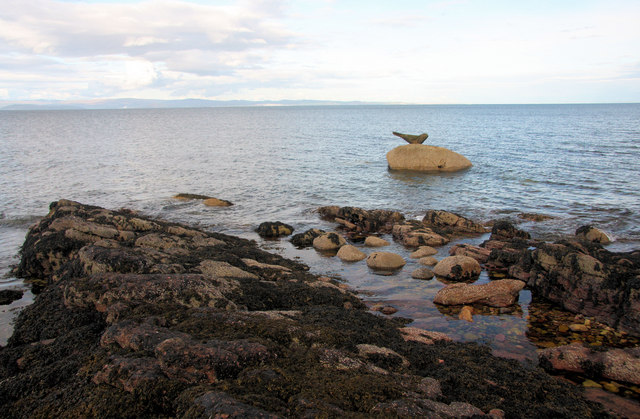
The Corrie Seal, a sculpture by local sculptor Marvin Elliott

== Culture ==
High Corrie (Scottish Gaelic: An Coire Àrd), nestling above the village, has long been favoured by artists, including Joan Eardley and Margot Sandeman. A summer school run by Jessie M King was located in High Corrie. The poet and writer Robert McLellan also spent time there.

The McLellan Festival, a celebration of Robert McLellan, is a week long event of local culture, including poetry, arts, music, film and drama.

== Community ==
Population has been falling: in January 2008, only 15 pupils attended the village's primary school, and the number was expected to further drop to 5 by 2012.

== 'Clyde' The Seal ==
'Clyde' The Corrie Seal is a wooden seal statue made by local sculptor Marvin Elliot, in 2008. The statue is a landmark that sits on a rock just off the coast of Corrie. The statue is known to confuse both the tourists and locals as to whether he is a real seal or not, seals are known to often be seen in that area, and occasionally may join Clyde on his rock. Despite being secured down with a metal pole, Clyde has been washed away on numerous occasions to places including:

- Turnberry, Scottish Mainland
- Troon, Scottish Mainland
- Lubas Bay, Isle Of Bute
