= Caisteal Abhail =

Mountain in Scotland

Coordinates: 55.65056°N 5.22951°W

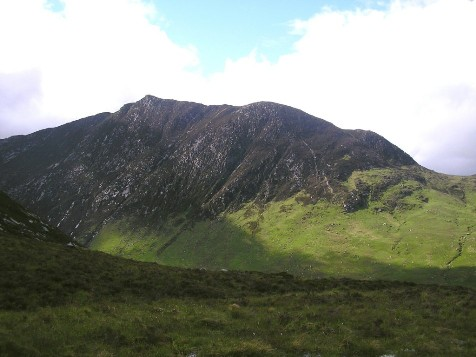
- Caisteal Abhail seen from Glen Sannox

Highest point
- Elevation: 859 m (2,818 ft)
- Prominence: 427 m (1,401 ft)
- Parent peak: Goat Fell
- Listing: Corbett, Marilyn

Naming
- English translation: Stronghold of the ptarmigan
- Language of name: Gaelic
- Pronunciation: Scottish Gaelic: [ˈkʰaʃtʲəl̪ˠ ˈaval]

Geography
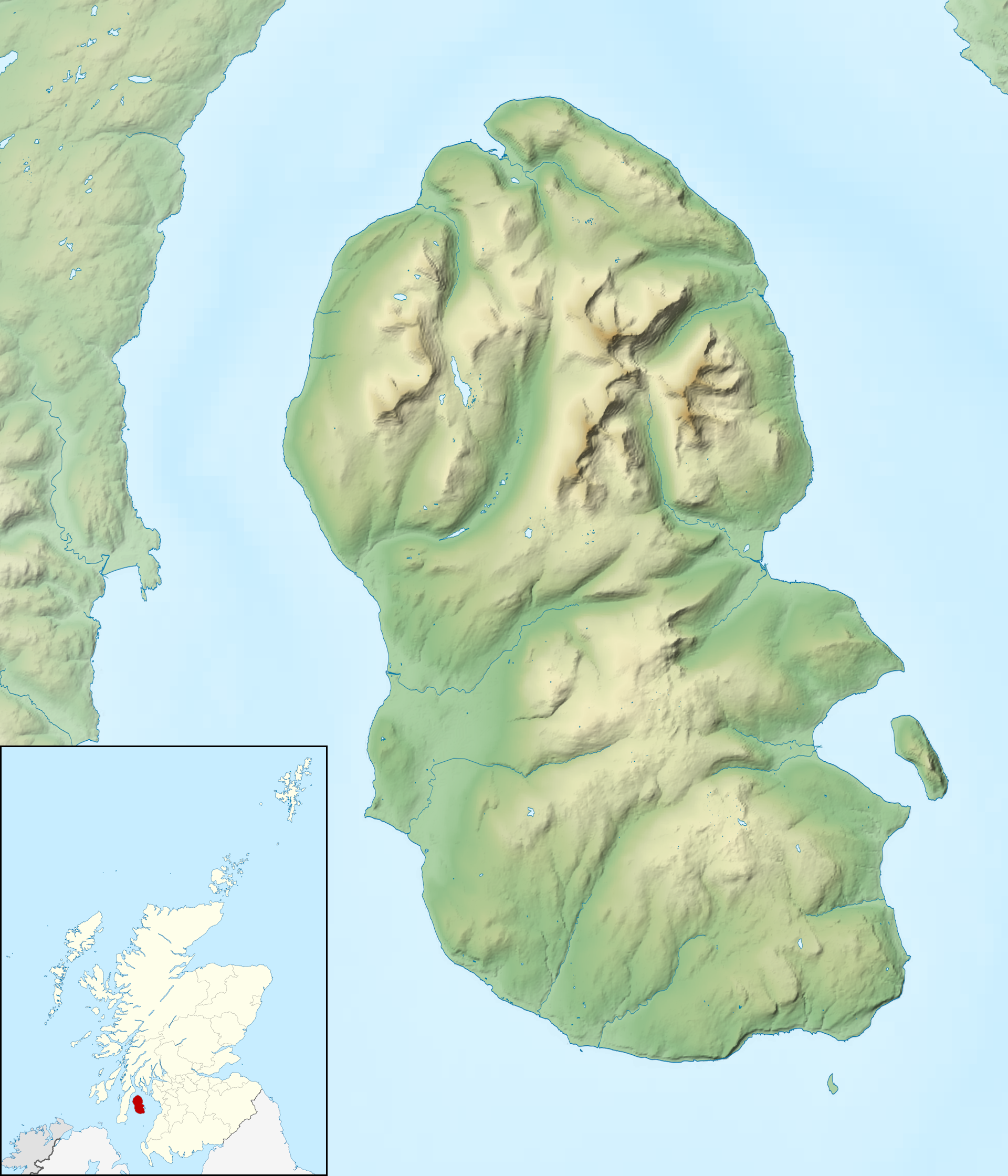
- Location within Arran
- Location: Isle of Arran, North Ayrshire, Scotland
- OS grid: NR969444
- Topo map: OS Landrangers 62, 69

Caisteal Abhail is a mountain on the Isle of Arran in Scotland.

It is the northernmost Corbett on the island. The mountain forms the main part of a view known as The Sleeping Warrior due to its distinctive outline (resembling the profile of a recumbent figure) as seen from the mainland. The most notable feature of the mountain is Ceum na Caillich (often rendered as the "Witch's Step", cailleach, here in genitive also means an old woman/hag), a deep gash in the eastern ridge. It is the northernmost peak in a chain of three Corbetts. Goat Fell (the highest peak on Arran) is in fact an eastern outlier to this chain.

The summit lies at the junction of four ridges: those running east, north and northwest eventually descend, whilst the southern ridge continues on to the central summit of the range, Cìr Mhòr. The summit is crowned with a series of rocky tors, and in poor visibility it may be difficult to ascertain which one marks the highest point.

The mountain is most frequently climbed from North Glen Sannox. There is a car park on the A841 road two miles (three kilometres) west of Sannox. From here, the summit can be attained via the northern, northwestern or eastern ridge. Ascent over the eastern ridge requires the walker to negotiate Ceum na Caillich, a tricky scramble that is not easily bypassed.

Ceum na Caillich and the eastern ridge may also be reached from the village of Sannox on the east coast of the island by way of Glen Sannox. The northwestern ridge can be climbed via a longer route following the Gleann Easan Biorach from Lochranza. An ascent of Caisteal Abhail is often combined with Cìr Mhòr, and indeed other Arran peaks.
