= Roche Bonhomme =

Mountain in Jasper National Park, Alberta, Canada

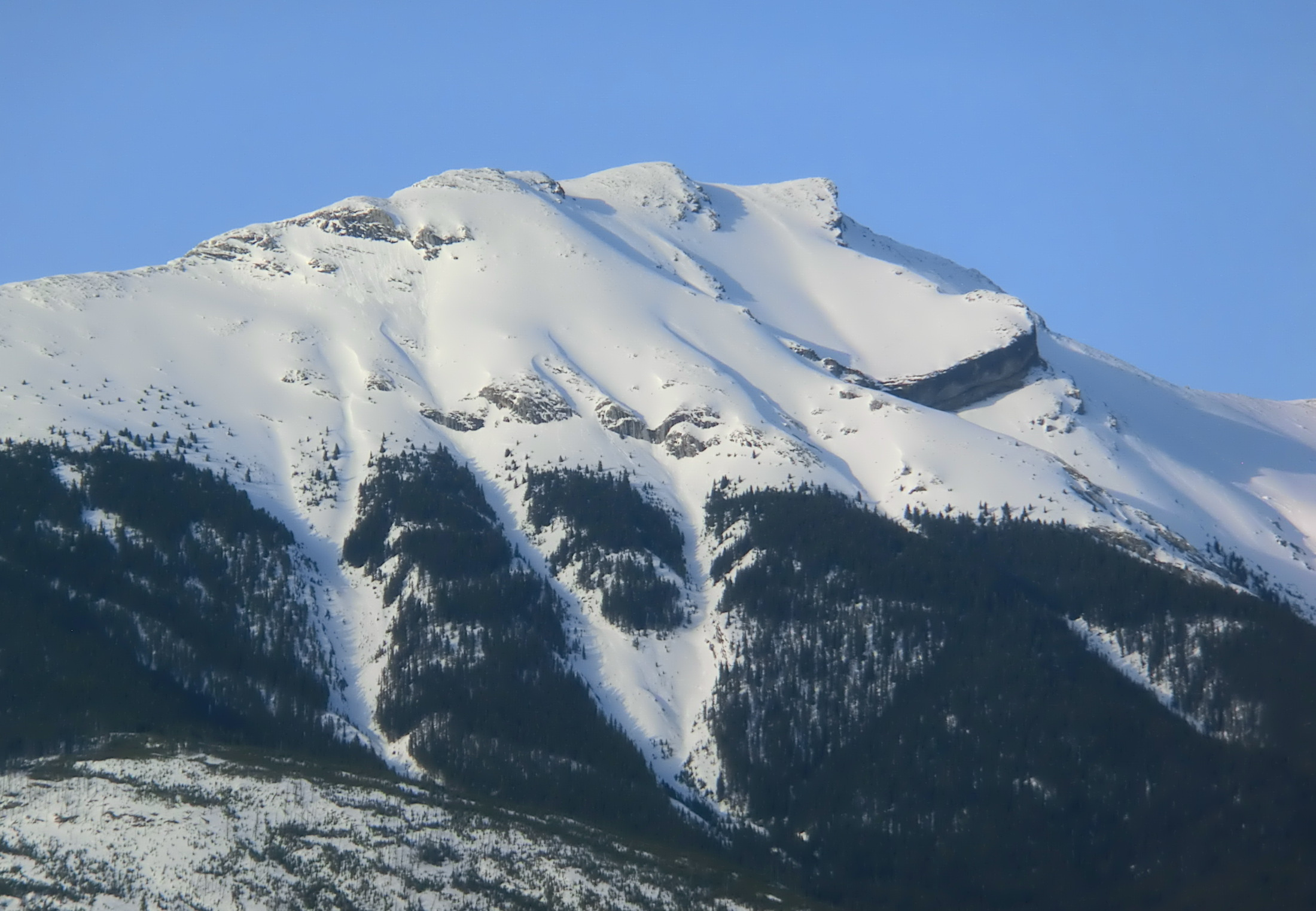
- Roche Bonhomme

Highest point
- Elevation: 2,495 m (8,186 ft)
- Prominence: 160 m (520 ft)
- Parent peak: Grisette Mountain (2620 m)
- Listing: Mountains of Alberta
- Coordinates: 52°56′41″N 117°56′36″W

Geography
- Location within Alberta Location within Canada
- Country: Canada
- Province: Alberta
- Protected area: Jasper National Park
- Parent range: Colin Range; Canadian Rockies
- Topo map: NTS 83C13 Medicine Lake

Geology
- Rock type: sedimentary rock

Roche Bonhomme is a 2,495-metre (8,186-foot) mountain summit located in Jasper National Park in Alberta, Canada. It is located in the Colin Range, which is a sub-range of the Canadian Rockies. The peak is situated 13 km (8.1 mi) northeast of the municipality of Jasper, and is a prominent landmark in the Athabasca Valley visible from Highway 16 and the Canadian. Its nearest higher peak is Grisette Mountain, 2.2 km (1.4 mi) to the east.

Roche Bonhomme was named in 1878 by George Munro Grant for the fact it has an anthropomorphic shape. The French "Roche Bonhomme" translates to "Rock Fellow." The mountain's name was officially adopted in 1947 by the Geographical Names Board of Canada. Roche Bonhomme is composed of Permian and Carboniferous strata topped by darker Triassic siltstone of the Sulphur Mountain Formation.

== Climate ==
Based on the Köppen climate classification, Roche Bonhomme is located in a subarctic climate with cold, snowy winters, and mild summers. Temperatures can drop below -20 °C with wind chill factors below -30 °C. In terms of favorable weather, June through September are the best months to climb. Precipitation runoff from Roche Bonhomme flows into tributaries of the Maligne River which in turn is a tributary of the Athabasca River.

== Gallery ==
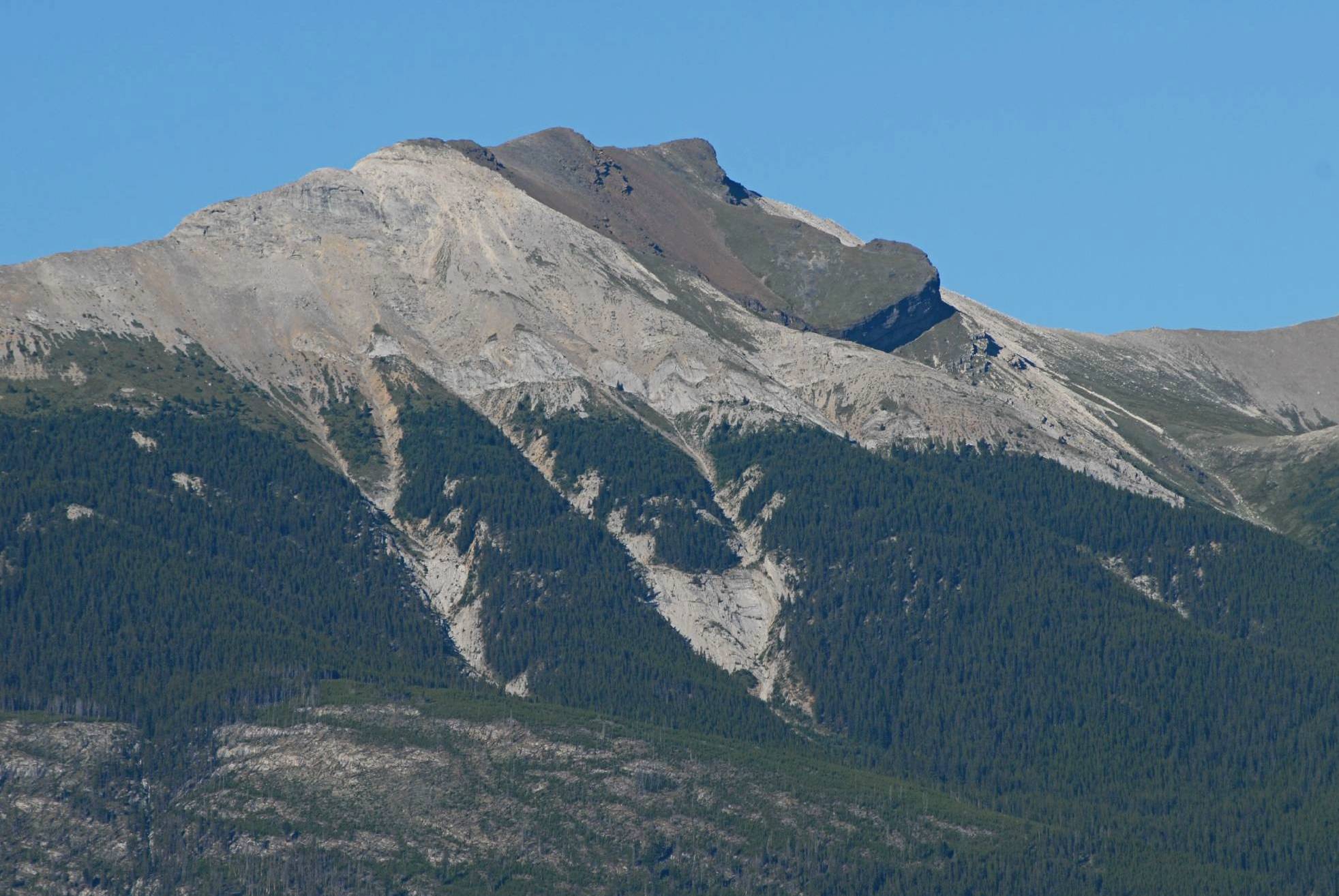
Roche Bonhomme

== See also ==
- Geography of Alberta
- Geology of the Rocky Mountains
