= Grisette Mountain =

Mountain in Jasper National Park, Alberta, Canada

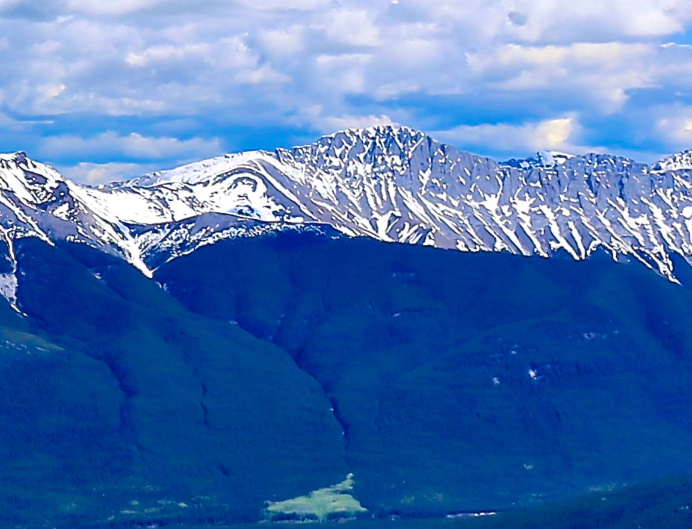
- Grisette Mountain seen from The Whistlers

Highest point
- Elevation: 2,620 m (8,600 ft)
- Prominence: 240 m (790 ft)
- Parent peak: Mount Dromore (2660 m)
- Listing: Mountains of Alberta
- Coordinates: 52°56′44″N 117°55′48″W

Geography
- Location within Alberta Location within Canada
- Country: Canada
- Province: Alberta
- Protected area: Jasper National Park
- Parent range: Colin Range; Canadian Rockies
- Topo map: NTS 83C13 Medicine Lake

Geology
- Rock type: Limestone

Grisette Mountain is a 2,620-metre (8,600 ft) mountain summit located in Jasper National Park in Alberta, Canada. It is located in the Colin Range, which is part of the front range mountains of the Canadian Rockies. The peak is situated 14 km (8.7 mi) northeast of the municipality of Jasper, and is a prominent landmark in the Athabasca Valley visible from Highway 16 and the Canadian. Its nearest higher peak is Mount Dromore, 2.4 km (1.5 mi) to the east.

Grisette Mountain was named in 1916 by Morrison P. Bridgland for its gray colored limestone. Bridgland (1878-1948) was a Dominion Land Surveyor who named many peaks in Jasper Park and the Canadian Rockies. The French word gris translates to gray. The mountain's name was officially adopted in 1947 by the Geographical Names Board of Canada.

== Climate ==
Based on the Köppen climate classification, Grisette Mountain is located in a subarctic climate with cold, snowy winters, and mild summers. Temperatures can drop below -20 °C with wind chill factors below -30 °C. In terms of favorable weather, June through September are the best months to climb. Precipitation runoff from Grisette Mountain flows into tributaries of the Maligne River and Rocky River, which are both tributaries of the Athabasca River.

== See also ==
- Geography of Alberta
