= Mount Colin =

Mountain in Alberta, Canada

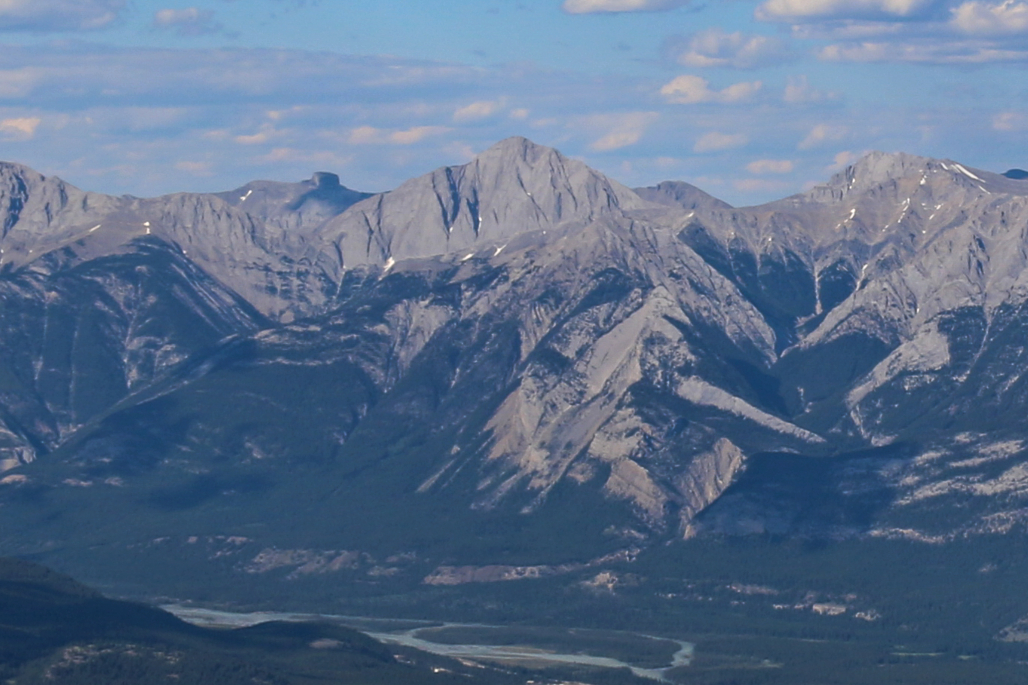
- Mount Colin seen from The Whistlers

Highest point
- Elevation: 2,687 m (8,816 ft)
- Prominence: 307 m (1,007 ft)
- Parent peak: Sirdar Mountain (2804 m)
- Listing: Mountains of Alberta
- Coordinates: 53°00′07″N 117°59′17″W

Geography
- Location within Alberta Location within Canada
- Country: Canada
- Province: Alberta
- Protected area: Jasper National Park
- Parent range: Colin Range; Canadian Rockies
- Topo map: NTS 83F4 Miette

Geology
- Rock type: limestone

Climbing
- First ascent: 1947 N.E. Odell, J. Ross, F.S. Smythe

Mount Colin is a 2,687-metre (8,816-foot) mountain summit located in Jasper National Park in Alberta, Canada. It is located in the Colin Range, which is a sub-range of the Canadian Rockies. The peak is situated 15 km (9.3 mi) northeast of the municipality of Jasper, and is a prominent landmark in the Athabasca Valley visible from Highway 16 and the Canadian. Its nearest higher peak is Sirdar Mountain, 15 km (9.3 mi) to the southeast. Mount Colin was named in 1859 by James Hector after Colin Fraser of the Hudson's Bay Company in charge of Jasper House from 1835 to 1849, and Sir George Simpson's personal servant. The mountain's name was officially adopted in 1956 by the Geographical Names Board of Canada.

== Climate ==
Based on the Köppen climate classification, Mount Colin is located in a subarctic climate zone with cold, snowy winters, and mild summers. Winter temperatures can drop below -20 °C with wind chill factors below -30 °C. In terms of favorable weather, June through September are the best months to climb. Precipitation runoff from Mount Colin flows into the Athabasca River.

== Gallery ==
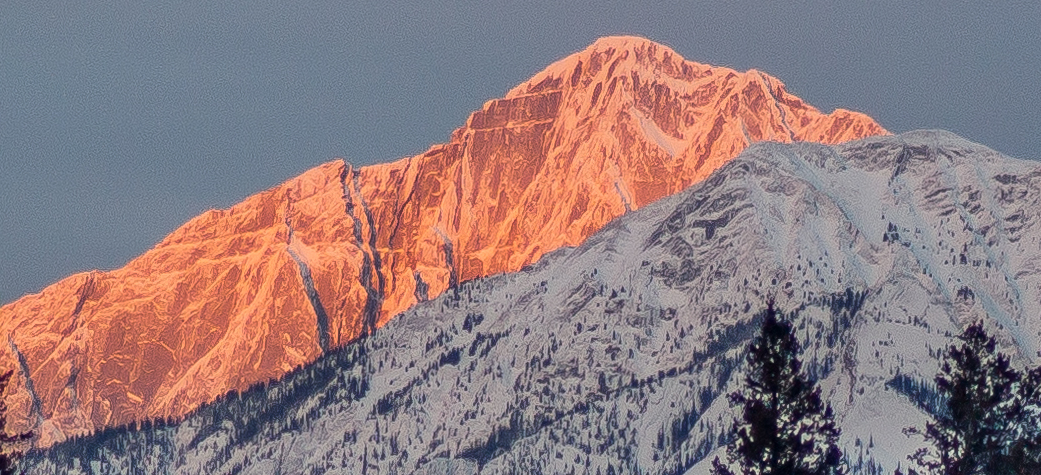
Sunset on Mount Colin

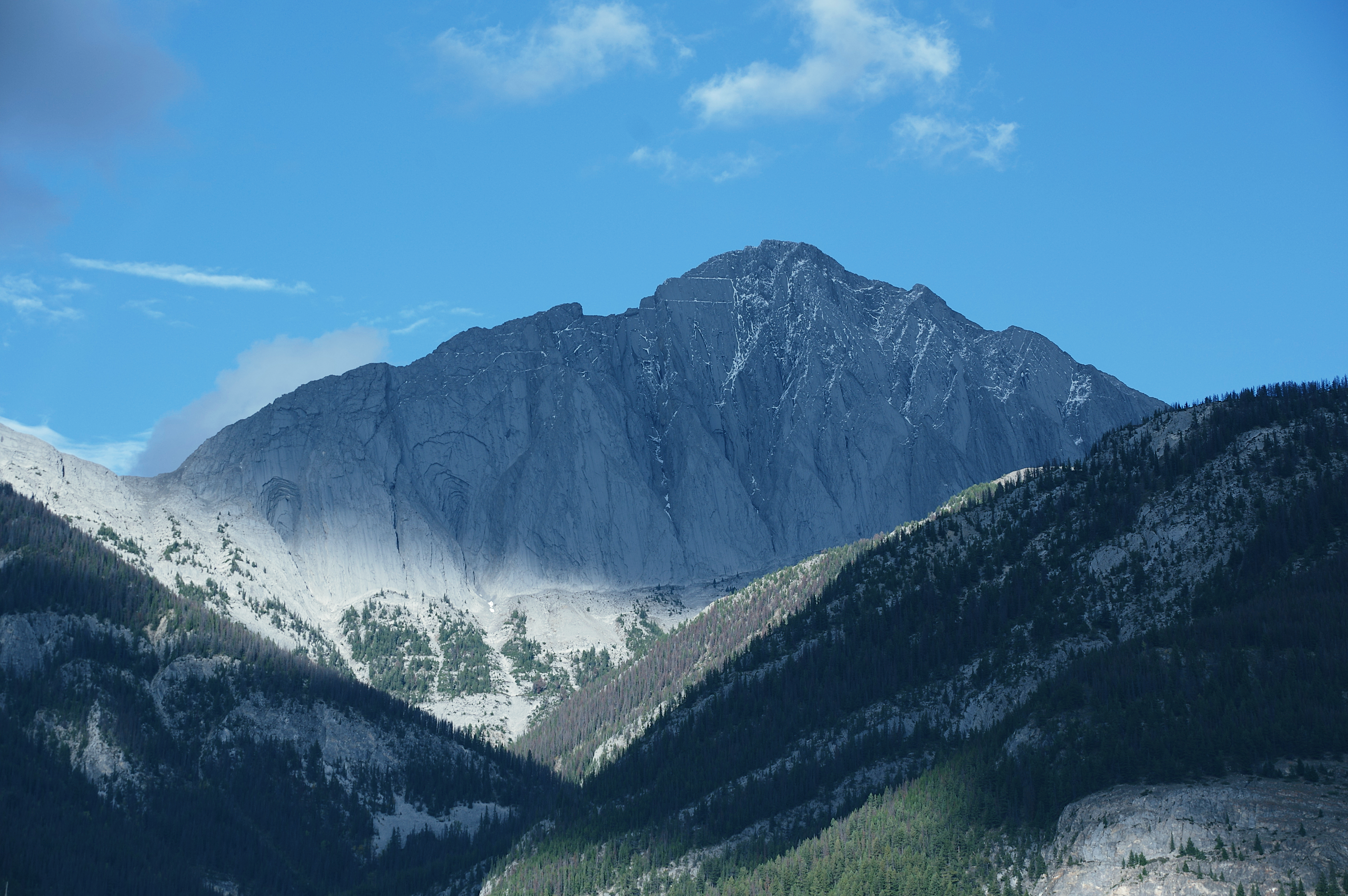
Mt. Colin

== See also ==
- Geography of Alberta
