= Northend Thistle F.C. =

Scottish association football club

Northend Thistle
- Full name: Northend Thistle Football Club
- Ground: Ewe Camp
- Coordinates: 55.6983°N 5.2763°W
- League: Isle of Arran League
colours

Northend Thistle Football Club are a football club based in Lochranza, Scotland.

They were originally founded as Arran Northend, but reformed in 2002 as Northend Thistle. They participate in the summertime Isle of Arran League, contested by five clubs from Arran that typically play on a Monday evening.

In 2005, Northend Thistle featured on the BBC Radio Scotland programme Let's Do the Show Right Here, and in 2008 on Countryfile. The same year, ESPN Asia ran a feature on the club, focussing on its winless streak extending all the way back to 1992. They were labelled "the worst football team in Europe", but they showed highlights of a 2008 win which was their first win in 18 years, against Southend, which were shown on Soccer Saturday in 2020. Media interest in the club continued, with BBC Sport Scotland running a feature on Northend in 2018.

== Ewe Camp ==
In 2005, Northend Thistle moved to the Ewe Camp, a pun from the Nou Camp because the ground is a sheep field when not being played on. Northend also play in the same colours as FC Barcelona.

In the 2020 book British Football's Greatest Grounds by Mike Bayly, the Ewe Camp was voted one of the top grounds to visit in the country. Bayly writes:

Ewe Camp is an astonishingly beautiful football setting. Located adjacent to a whisky distillery and surrounded by the sunlit hills of Torr Nead on three sides, it is the very essence of Scotland in miniature.
