= Hawk Mountain (Alberta) =

Mountain in Canada

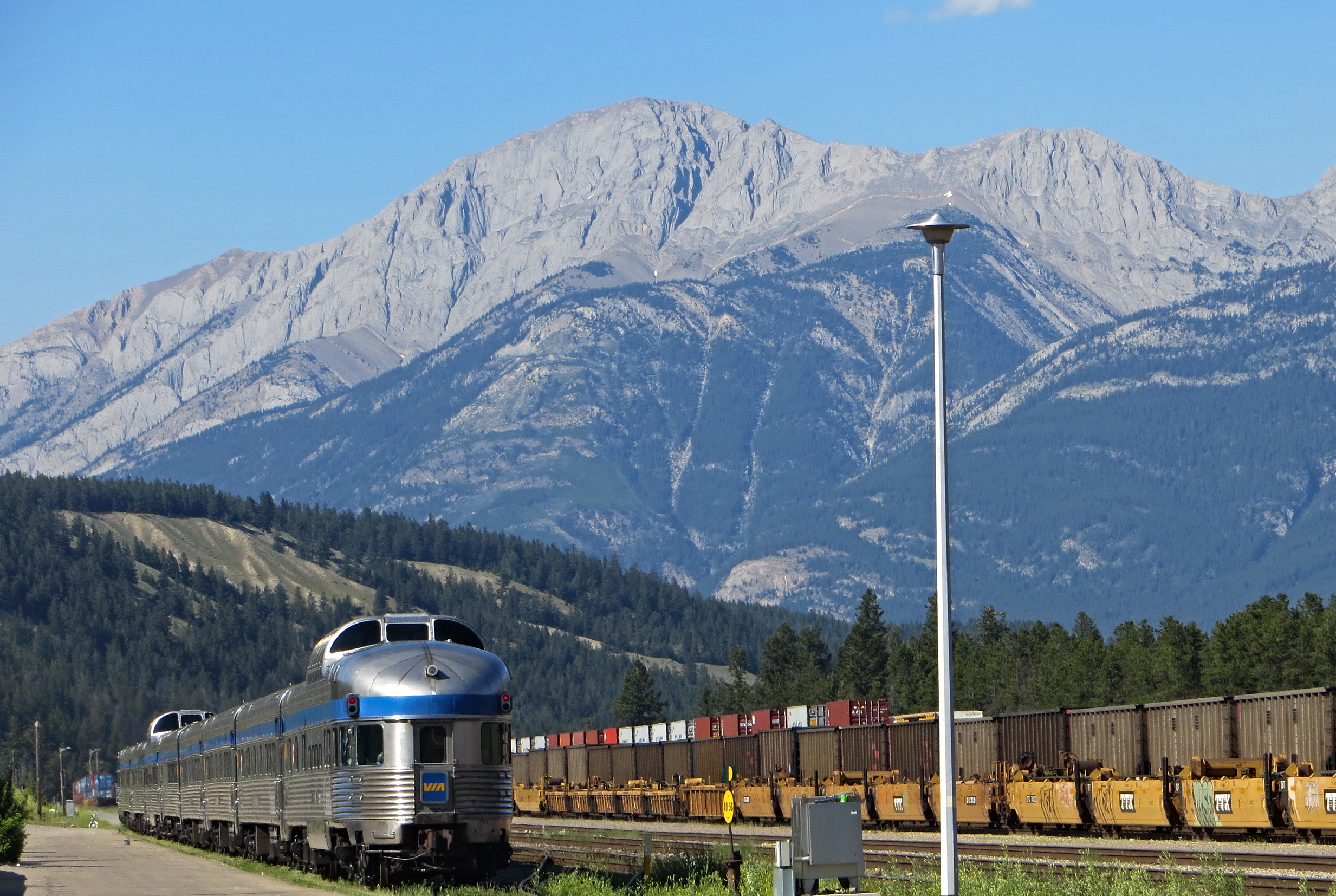
- Hawk Mountain seen from Jasper station

Highest point
- Elevation: 2,553 m (8,376 ft)
- Prominence: 343 m (1,125 ft)
- Parent peak: Mount Colin (2687 m)
- Listing: Mountains of Alberta
- Coordinates: 53°00′52″N 118°01′05″W

Geography
- Location within Alberta Location within Canada
- Country: Canada
- Province: Alberta
- Protected area: Jasper National Park
- Parent range: Colin Range; Canadian Rockies
- Topo map: NTS 83E1 Snaring River

Geology
- Rock type: sedimentary rock

Hawk Mountain is a 2,553-metre (8,376-foot) mountain summit located in Jasper National Park in Alberta, Canada. It is located near the northwest end of the Colin Range, which is a sub-range of the Canadian Rockies. The peak is situated 16 km (9.9 mi) northeast of the municipality of Jasper, and is a prominent landmark in the Athabasca Valley visible from Highway 16 and the Canadian. Its nearest higher peak is Mount Colin, 2.4 km (1.5 mi) to the southeast. Hawk Mountain was named in 1916 by Morrison P. Bridgland for the fact that a hawk was flying near the summit at the time it was named. Bridgland (1878-1948) was a Dominion Land Surveyor who named many peaks in Jasper Park and the Canadian Rockies. The mountain's name was officially adopted in 1956 by the Geographical Names Board of Canada.

== Climate ==
Based on the Köppen climate classification, Hawk Mountain is located in a subarctic climate zone with cold, snowy winters, and mild summers. Winter temperatures can drop below -20 °C with wind chill factors below -30 °C. In terms of favorable weather, June through September are the best months for viewing and climbing. Precipitation runoff from Hawk Mountain flows into the Athabasca River.

== See also ==
- Geography of Alberta
