= Colin Range =

Mountain range of the Canadian Rockies

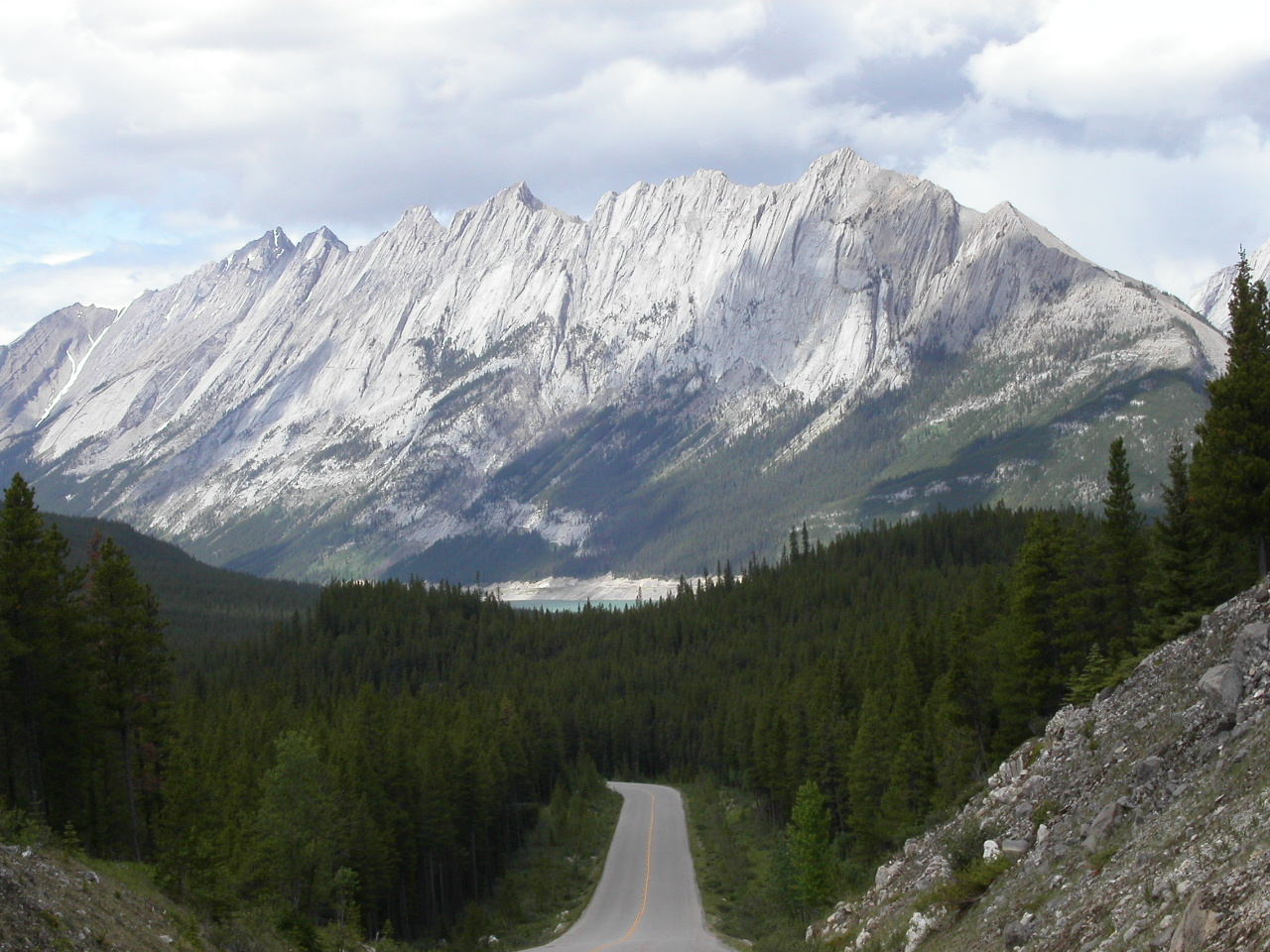
- Colin Range seen from the Maligne Lake road

Highest point
- Peak: Sirdar Mountain
- Elevation: 2,804 m (9,199 ft)
- Listing: Mountains of Alberta
- Coordinates: 52°55′36″N 117°48′42″W

Geography
- Location within Alberta
- Country: Canada
- Province: Alberta
- Range coordinates: 52°58′N 117°57′W
- Parent range: Canadian Rockies
- Topo map: NTS 83C13 Medicine Lake

The Colin Range is a mountain range of the Canadian Rockies located directly northeast of the Jasper townsite in Jasper National Park, Canada.

== List of Mountains ==
This range includes the following mountains:

Name	Elevation		Prominence		Coordinates
Name	m	ft	m	ft	Coordinates
Sirdar Mountain	2,804	9,199	1,274	4,180	52°55′36″N 117°48′42″W
Mount Colin	2,687	8,816	307	1,007	53°0′7″N 117°59′17″W
Mount Dromore	2,660	8,730	360	1,180	52°56′18″N 117°52′53″W
Grisette Mountain	2,620	8,600	240	790	52°56′44″N 117°55′48″W
Colin Ridge	2,563	8,409			
Hawk Mountain	2,553	8,376	343	1,125	53°0′52″N 118°1′5″W
Roche Bonhomme	2,495	8,186	160	520	52°56′41″N 117°56′36″W
Morro Peak	1,676	5,499	109	358	53°2′0″N 118°4′4″W

== See also ==
- Ranges of the Canadian Rockies
