= Mount Dromore =

Mountain in Canada

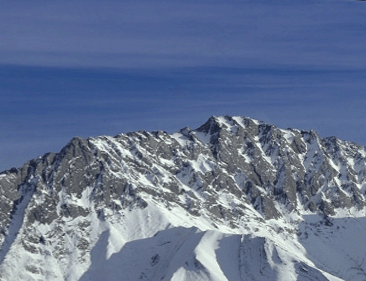
- Mount Dromore (south-west face) viewed from Highway 16

Highest point
- Elevation: 2,660 m (8,730 ft)
- Prominence: 360 m (1,180 ft)
- Parent peak: Sirdar Mountain (2804 m)
- Listing: Mountains of Alberta
- Coordinates: 52°56′18″N 117°52′53″W

Geography
- Location within Alberta
- Country: Canada
- Province: Alberta
- Protected area: Jasper National Park
- Parent range: Colin Range, Canadian Rockies
- Topo map: NTS 83C13 Medicine Lake

Mount Dromore is a summit in Alberta, Canada located in the Maligne River Valley at the head of Dromore Creek in Jasper National Park.

Named by M.P. Bridgland in 1916, Mount Dromore takes its name from Dromore, in Ireland.
