= Glen Rosa =

Coordinates: 55.607°N 5.205°W

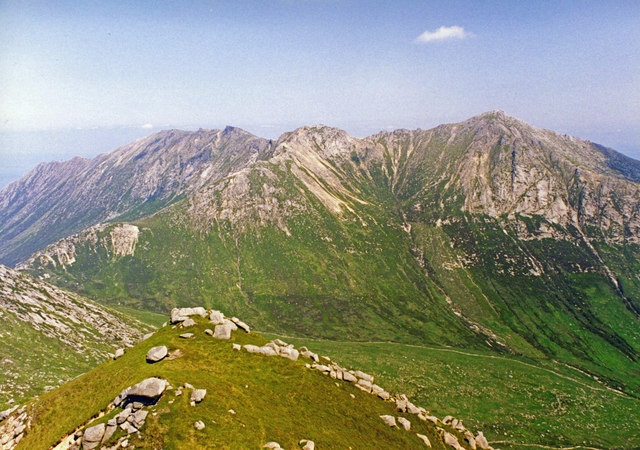
The north end of Glen Rosa and Goat Fell massif viewed from A' Chìr

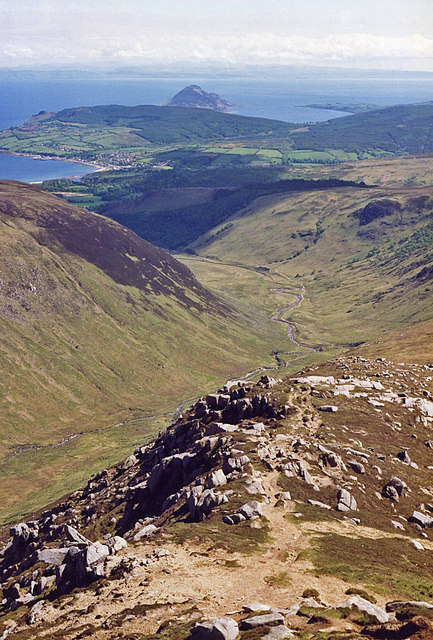
Glen Rosa descending towards Brodick and the coast, viewed from Beinn a Chliabhain

Glen Rosa (Scottish Gaelic: Gleann Ruasaidh) is a glen near Goat Fell on the Isle of Arran in the Firth of Clyde, western Scotland.

Glen Rosa can be reached from the road just outside Brodick. The trek up the glen is fairly low-lying, gaining less than 200 metres (660 feet) in elevation.

== Camping and climbing ==
There is a campsite at the foot of the glen.

Glen Rosa is convenient to reach some of the main peaks on Arran.
