= Sannox =

Village on the Isle of Arran, Scotland

Coordinates: 55.663°N 5.156°W

Sannox: Scottish Gaelic: Sannaig
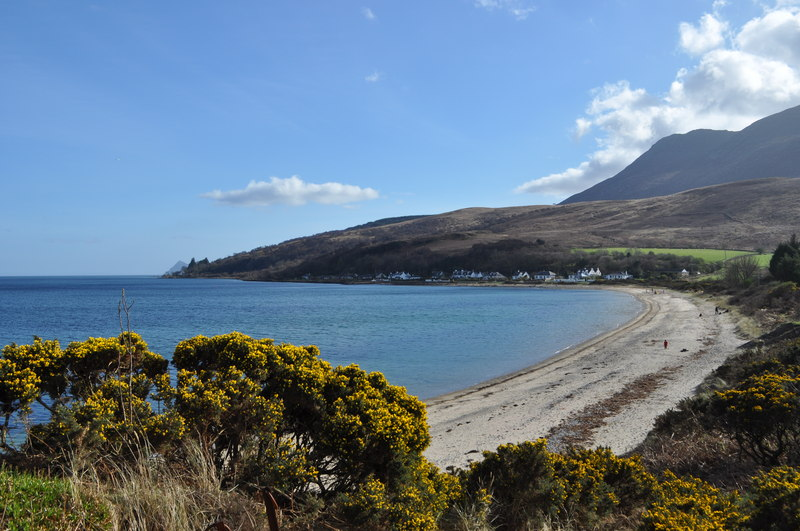
- Sannox Bay in 2011

- Location within North Ayrshire
- OS grid reference: NS015455
- Civil parish: Kilbride
- Council area: North Ayrshire
- Lieutenancy area: Ayrshire and Arran
- Country: Scotland
- Sovereign state: United Kingdom
- Post town: ISLE OF ARRAN
- Postcode district: KA27
- Dialling code: 01770
- Police: Scotland
- Fire: Scottish
- Ambulance: Scottish
- UK Parliament: North Ayrshire and Arran
- Scottish Parliament: Cunninghame North

Sannox (Scottish Gaelic: Sannaig) is a village on the Isle of Arran, Scotland. The village is within the parish of Kilbride. The name comes from the name the Vikings gave to the area, Sandvik, meaning the Sandy Bay.

== History ==
Within North Glen Sannox it is possible to find an Iron Age fort and the remains of a village, abandoned in 1829 as part of the process of the Highland clearances. Most of the inhabitants of this village emigrated to Canada where they built a replica of the church that was constructed in Sannox in 1822. The replica church in Inverness, Quebec, is no longer there (since the 1950s) and only the cemetery remains. Remains of the houses and runrigs - a type of farming common in western Scotland at the time - are visible throughout North Glen Sannox.

Mining was a source of employment in the area, when in 1840 a mine was opened in Glen Sannox. However operations only lasted around two decades. Operations ended when in 1862 the 11th Duke of Hamilton closed the mine, claiming that it spoiled the local area. However, the mine was reopened after the close of the First World War, and a railway and pier were built to transport the barytes that was mined there.

The source of barytes ran out in 1938 and the mine closed. The railway and pier to which it ran were removed in the 1940s, though the remains of the latter can still be seen on Sannox beach.

A small boat yard used to operate at the village jetty.

The cemetery in Glen Sannox used to house a small chapel. It is the burial site of Edwin Muir, who was murdered on Goatfell in 1889 by John Laurie.

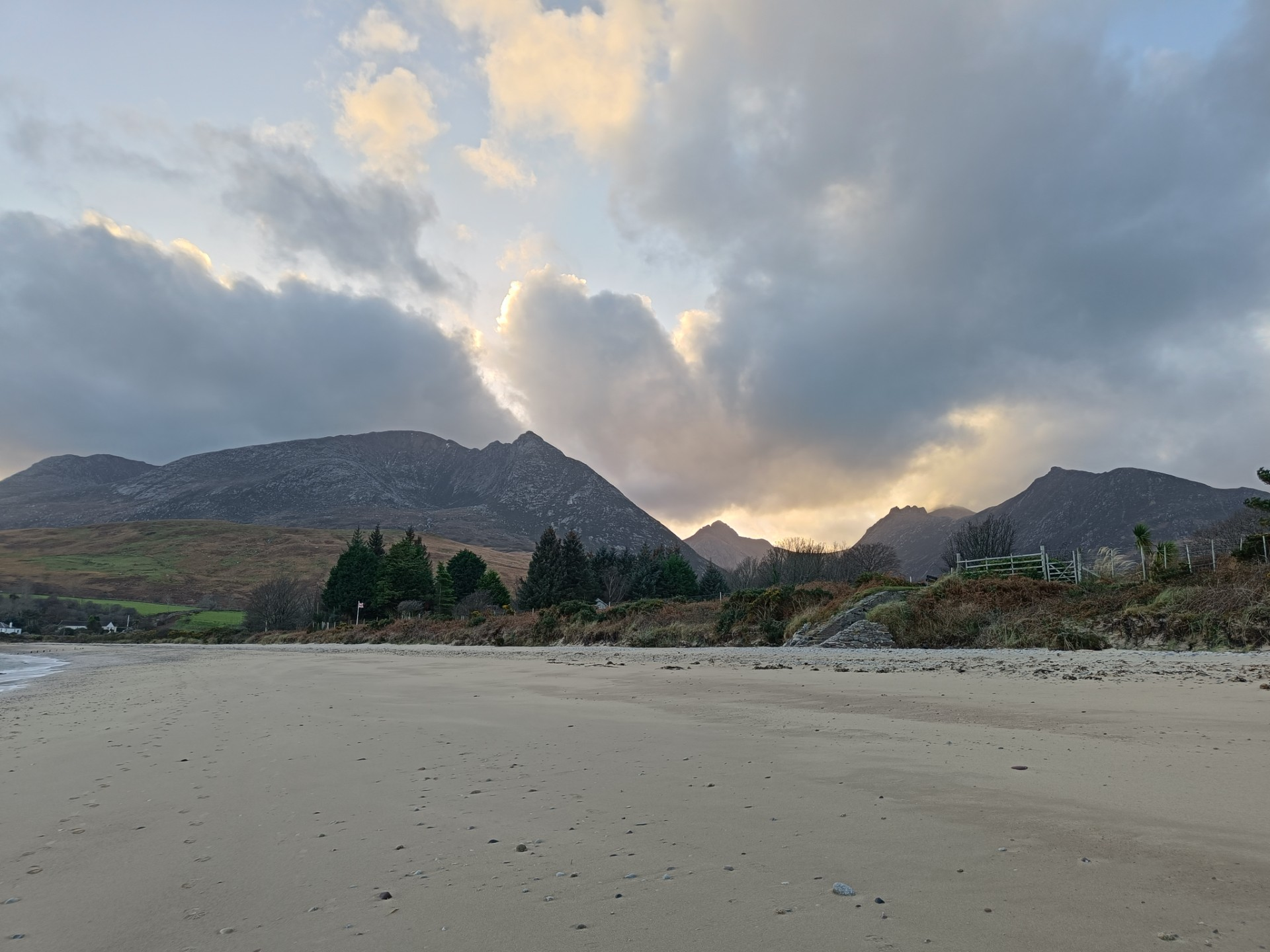
Glen Sannox viewed from Sannox Beach

== Geography ==
Sannox sits on the east coast of the Isle of Arran, with a stunning backdrop of scenery in the shape of Glen Sannox. To the north lies North Glen Sannox. The A841 road passes through to Lochranza, on a stretch of road known locally as the Boguille.

== Community ==
Sannox is the location of the Corrie Golf Club, a nine-hole golf course, named after the locally twinned village of Corrie. It is also the location of Sannox Cricket Club.
