= Sirdar Mountain =

Mountain in Alberta, Canada

- Location within Alberta

Highest point
- Elevation: 2,804 m (9,199 ft)
- Prominence: 1,274 m (4,180 ft)
- Listing: Mountains of Alberta
- Coordinates: 52°55′36″N 117°48′42″W

Geography
- Location: Alberta, Canada
- Parent range: Colin Range
- Topo map: NTS 83C13 Medicine Lake

Sirdar Mountain was named in 1926 by W.P. Hinton; the source of the name is not known. It is located in the Colin Range of Jasper National Park, Alberta.

== See also ==
- Geography of Alberta
