= Cìr Mhòr =

Coordinates: 55°38′22.34″N 5°13′18.76″W

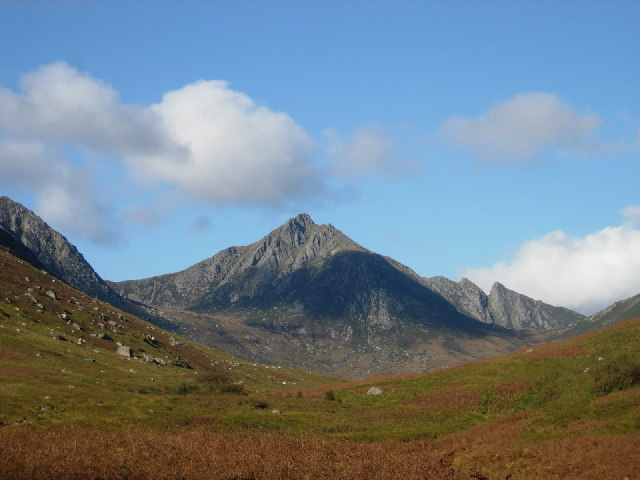
- Cìr Mhòr from Glen Rosa

Highest point
- Elevation: 799 m (2,621 ft)
- Prominence: 175 m (574 ft)
- Parent peak: Caisteal Abhail
- Listing: Marilyn, Corbett

Geography
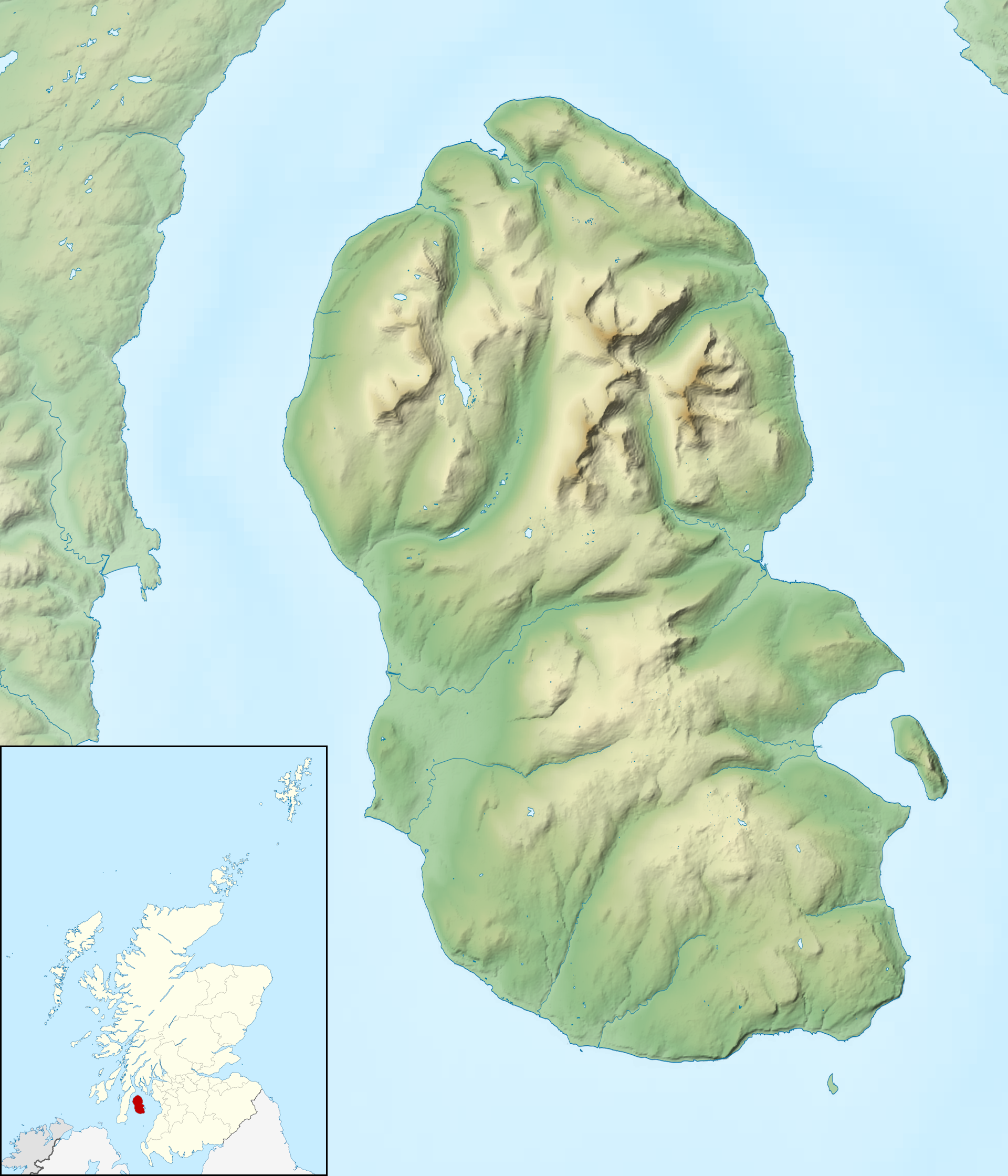
- Location within Arran
- Location: Isle of Arran, North Ayrshire, Scotland
- Parent range: Isle of Arran
- OS grid: NR972431

Cìr Mhòr (Scottish Gaelic, usually with definite article, A' Chìr Mhòr) is a Corbett known as the Matterhorn of Arran. Its name means the "big comb", referring its resemblance to a cockscomb. It is separated from the island's highest peak, Goat Fell, by a col called The Saddle.
