= Lochranza =

Coordinates: 55.705°N 5.295°W

Lochranza: Scottish Gaelic: Loch Raonasa
- Village
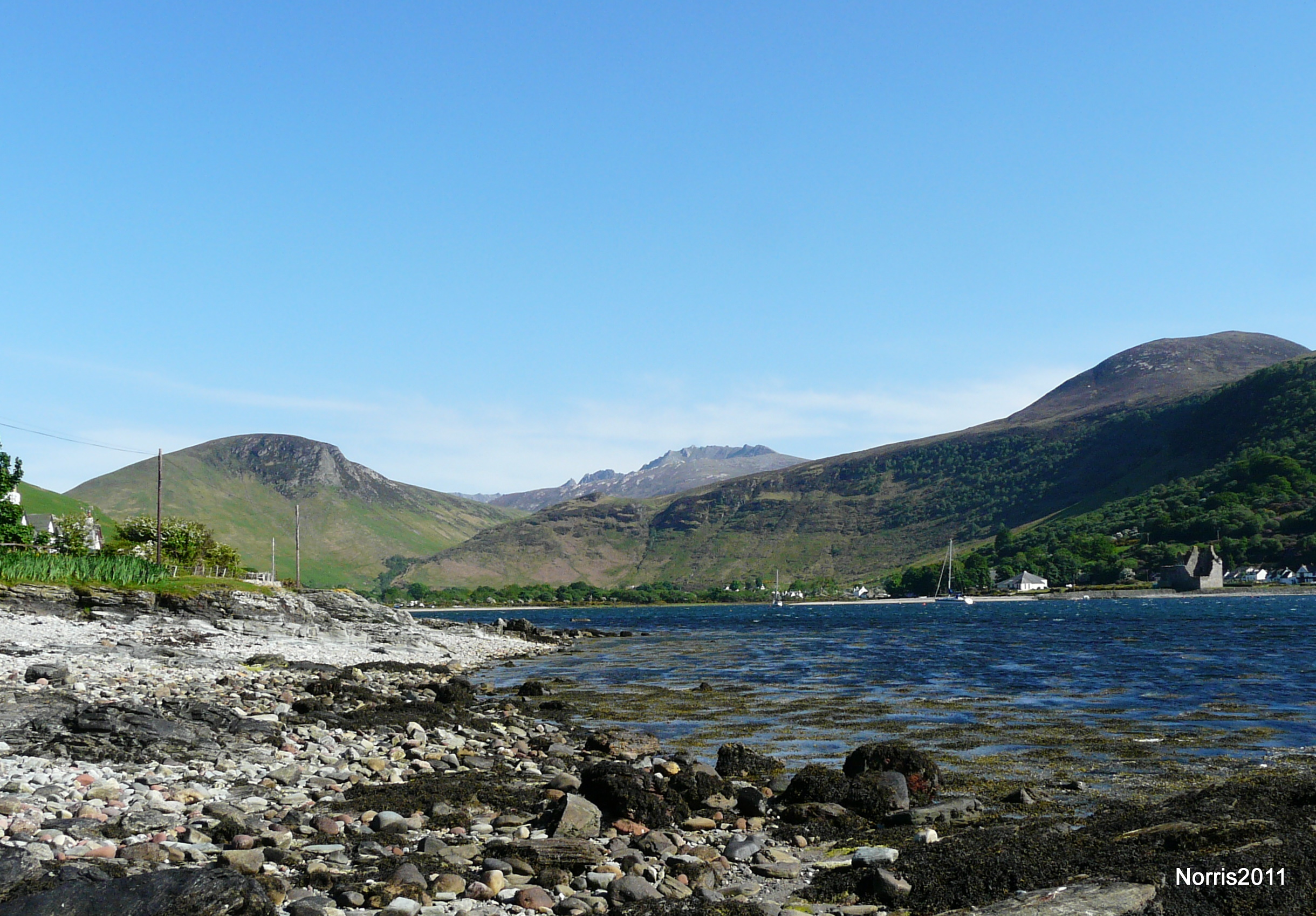
- Panoramic of Lochranza Bay, May 2008

- Location within North Ayrshire
- Population: 251
  - Density: n/a
- OS grid reference: NR929506
  - Edinburgh: 96 mi (154 km)
  - London: 443 mi (713 km)
- Civil parish: Kilbride
- Council area: North Ayrshire
- Lieutenancy area: Ayrshire and Arran
- Country: Scotland
- Sovereign state: United Kingdom
- Post town: ISLE OF ARRAN
- Postcode district: KA27
- Dialling code: 01770
- Police: Scotland
- Fire: Scottish
- Ambulance: Scottish
- UK Parliament: North Ayrshire and Arran
- Scottish Parliament: Cunninghame North
- Website: North Ayrshire

Lochranza (Scottish Gaelic: Loch Raonasa) is a village located on the Isle of Arran in the Firth of Clyde, Scotland. The population, somewhat in decline, is around 200 people.

== Geography ==
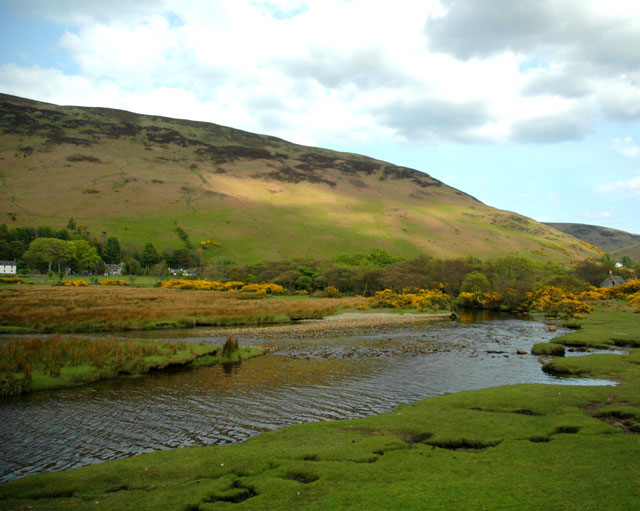
Countryside near Lochranza

Lochranza is the northernmost of Arran's villages and is located in the northwestern corner of the island. The village is set on the shore of Loch Ranza, a small sea loch. Ferries run from here to Claonaig on the mainland. The village is flanked to the northeast by the landmark hill Torr Meadhonach.

=== Geology ===
Lochranza has a field study centre, where schools from all over the UK come to study the locality's interesting geology and the nearby Hutton's Unconformity to the north of Newton Point, where the "father of modern geology" James Hutton found his first example of an angular unconformity during a visit in 1787.

=== Climate ===
Lochranza is reputed to have the fewest hours of sunshine of any village in the United Kingdom, and is the most shaded village in the entire world according to world climate experts, since it lies in a north-facing glen on an island with a particularly high level of rainfall. The streets do not have any street lights so it can be dark in the winter months.

=== Wildlife ===
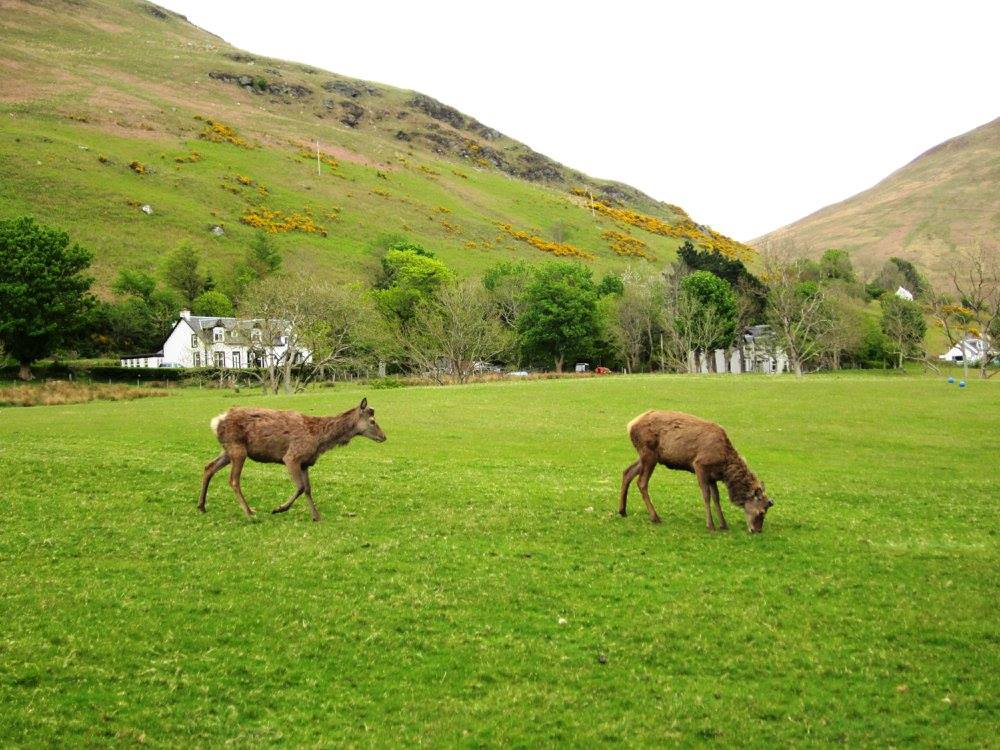
Red deer on Lochranza golf course

The area around Lochranza Castle is a favoured spot to observe red deer, as the village is home to a healthy red deer population and, on the northern shore, grey seals are found year-round. Otters and golden eagles are also spotted in the area.

== Economy ==
Formerly a herring fishing port, the village economy is now geared more towards tourism after the reopening of the pier in 2003. Lochranza Castle is a fine ruin of a 16th-century L-plan castle, across the road from the Lochranza youth hostel. The youth hostel was built as a hotel in 1893–94 to the designs of the architect John Burnet.

Lochranza is the site of the Arran Distillery, built in 1995 and producing the Arran Single Malt. The distillery is one of the major industries of the island. The bar of the Lochranza Hotel, to the north of the distillery, has one of the largest collections of Scotch whisky available by the measure in the country: over 350 different Scotch whiskies are available.

Lochranza has a golf course with eleven holes.

== Transport ==
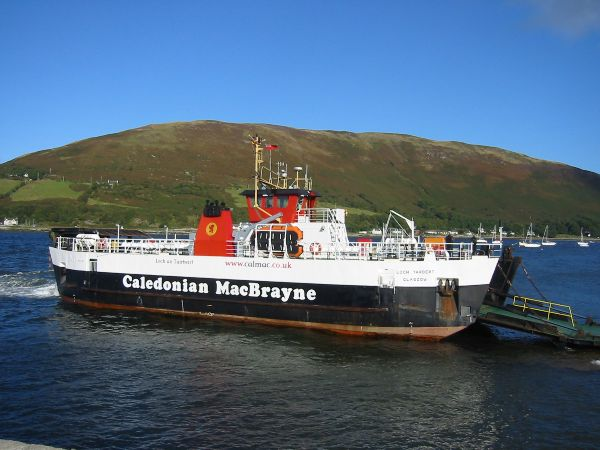
MV Loch Tarbert at Lochranza slipway

Caledonian MacBrayne operates a regular ferry service to Claonaig on Kintyre between March and October. There are seven daily crossings to Claonaig which operates at a roughly 90-minute frequency, and a once-daily service to Tarbert on Loch Fyne during the winter departing at 1345 daily from October to March. The usual vessel on this route is the MV Catriona, which replaced the MV Loch Tarbert in September 2016.

A new pier was constructed in 2003, allowing larger vessels easier access with the possibility to disembark passengers for a short tour of the village. Regular vessels which use the pier include the paddle steamer Waverley and the Lord of the Glens, a small cruise ship.

Preceding station	Ferry	Following station
Terminus	Caledonian MacBrayne; Ferry (winter only)	Tarbert
Terminus	Caledonian MacBrayne; Ferry (summer only)	Claonaig

Lochranza is on the 324 bus route between Brodick and Blackwaterfoot.

== Culture ==
It is said that a local midwife once had an encounter with the Queen of the Fairies at Lochranza.

The village is also celebrated in verse:

On fair Lochranza streamed the early day,
Thin wreaths of cottage smoke are upward curl'd
From the lone hamlet, which her inland bay
And circling mountains sever from the world

— Sir Walter Scott, The Lord of the Isle

The actress Katharine O'Donnelly was raised in the village.

Northend Thistle Football Club are based in Lochranza. They were once labelled "the worst football team in Europe", with a winless streak of 19 years, and featured on ESPN Asia, Soccer Saturday and BBC Sport Scotland. Northend Thistle play at the Ewe Camp, voted one of the top grounds to visit in the country.
