= County of Bute =

Coordinates: 55°45′N 5°15′W

Bute Siorrachd Bhòid (Scottish Gaelic)
- Historic county
- Country: Scotland
- County town: Rothesay

Area
  - Total: 225 sq mi (583 km^{2})
- Ranked 30th of 34
- Chapman code: BUT

The County of Bute (Scottish Gaelic: Siorrachd Bhòid), also known as Buteshire, is a historic county and registration county of Scotland. It comprised a number of islands in the Firth of Clyde, between the counties of Argyll and Ayr, the principal islands being Bute, Arran, Great Cumbrae and Little Cumbrae. The county town was Rothesay, located on the island of Bute. The County of Bute had its own elected county council from 1890 to 1975.

The historic County of Bute was divided between new council areas with implementation of the Local Government etc. (Scotland) Act 1994, on the 1 April 1996. The new Argyll and Bute Council area was given responsibility for island of Bute itself, while the island of Arran and The Cumbraes were added to the new North Ayrshire Council area.

== History ==
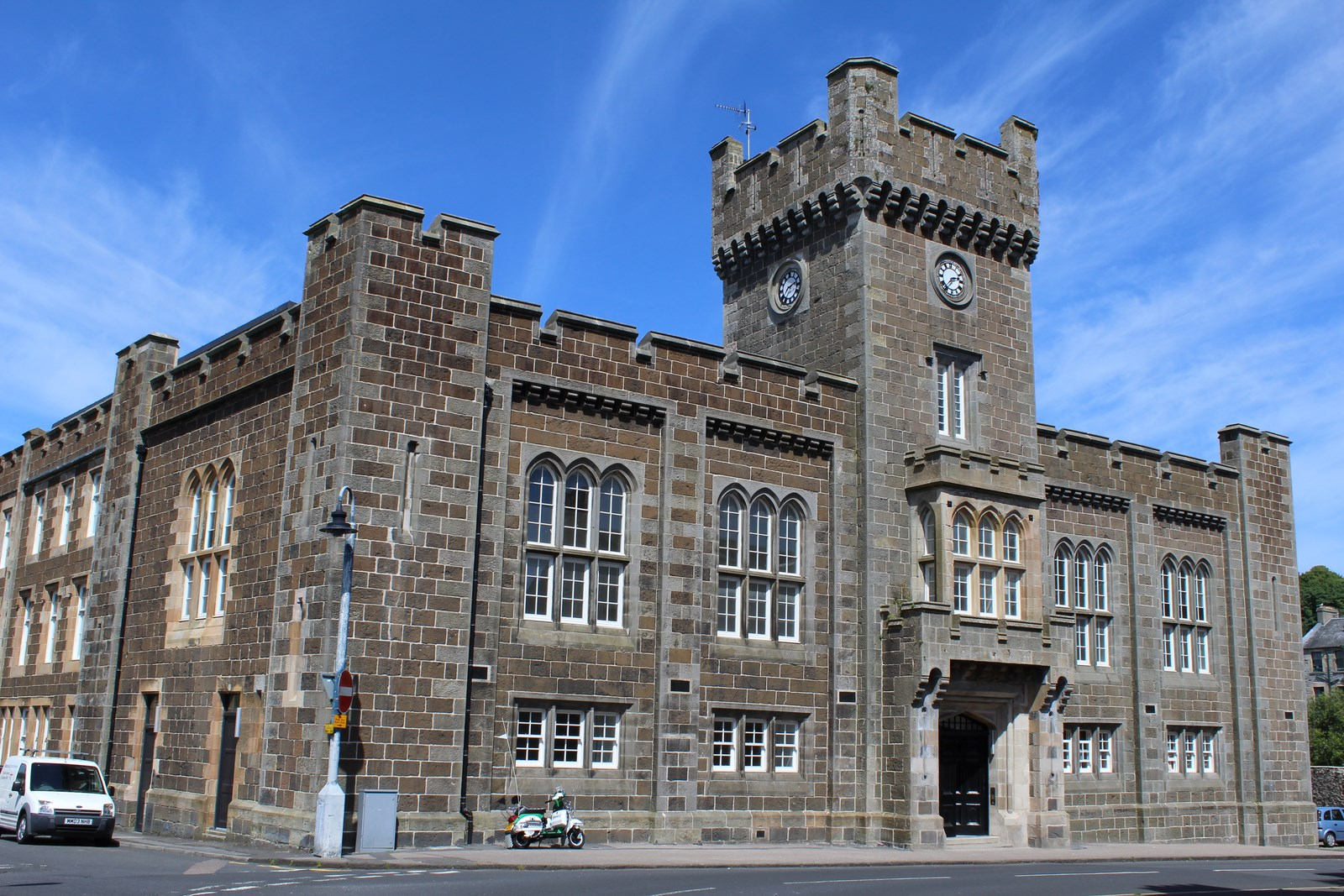
Rothesay Town Hall and County Buildings

Buteshire was created as a shire (the area administered by a sheriff) by Robert II around 1385. Prior to that the islands in the Firth of Clyde had not formed part of any shire. The position of Sheriff of Bute was initially given to Robert's illegitimate son, John Stewart, and subsequently passed to John's descendants, who became the Earls of Bute in 1703.

Inherited sheriffdoms were abolished by the Heritable Jurisdictions (Scotland) Act 1746, after which sheriffs were appointed by the crown. The Sheriffs (Scotland) Act 1747 then placed Buteshire under a joint sheriff with neighbouring Argyll.

Meanwhile, in 1667 Commissioners of Supply were established for each shire, which would serve as the main administrative body for the area until the creation of county councils in 1890. Elected county councils were created in 1890 under the Local Government (Scotland) Act 1889, taking most of the functions of the Commissioners of Supply. The County of Bute Council was based at the Rothesay Town Hall and County Buildings at 31 High Street in Rothesay, which had been built in 1835 and served as the meeting place for Rothesay Town Council and the Commissioners of Supply, as well as being the courthouse for Buteshire.

The County of Bute was abolished for local government purposes in 1975 under the Local Government (Scotland) Act 1973, which replaced Scotland's counties, burghs and landward districts, with upper-tier regions and lower-tier districts. The County of Bute was included in the Strathclyde region, with the Isle of Bute being placed in the Argyll district, and the Isle of Arran and the Cumbraes being placed in Cunninghame district. Strathclyde region was abolished in 1996 when the regions and districts were replaced by unitary council areas, with Argyll and Bute becoming a council area, and Cunninghame being renamed to become the North Ayrshire council area.

The County of Bute historic boundaries are still used for some limited official purposes connected with land registration, being a registration county.

== Geography ==
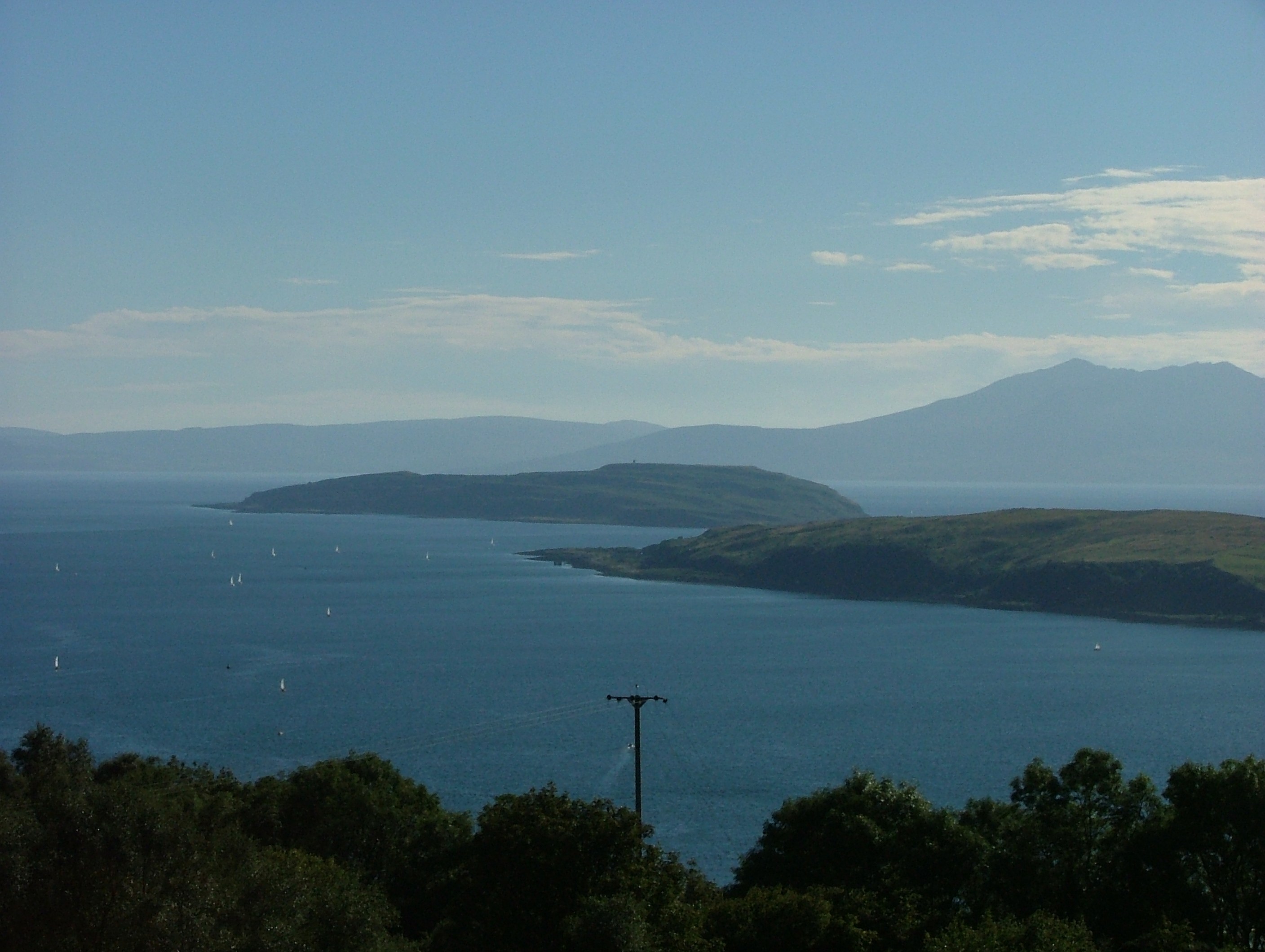
Little Cumbrae seen from the Haylie Brae on the mainland, with Great Cumbrae in the foreground at the right and Arran beyond

The County of Bute consisted of two main islands in the Firth of Clyde separated by the Sound of Bute: Arran (also including the much smaller Holy Island, Hamilton Isle and Pladda off the south-east coast); and Bute (including the small isle of Inchmarnock off its west coast); and also the Cumbraes between Bute and Ayrshire on the mainland, comprising Great Cumbrae, Little Cumbrae and the islets of The Eileans, Broad Islands, Castle Island and Trail Island.

Arran is Scotland's 7th largest island and is a popular tourist destination, often referred to as 'Scotland in miniature' due to the wide variety of scenery and geographical features that can be found here. The island is roughly peanut-shaped, being flatter in the south and more mountainous in the north, culminating in Goat Fell, the tallest mountain in Buteshire at 874 metres (2,866 ft). It is separated from the Kintyre Peninsula by the Kilbrannan Sound. Bute is in contrast is a much flatter though somewhat hilly island, especially in the north; it is separated from the Cowal Peninsula by the narrow Kyles of Bute. A number of lochs lie in the centre of the island, most notably Loch Fad, Loch Quien and Loch Ascog.

== Transport ==
The Isle of Bute is connected by ferry to Wemyss Bay on the mainland; a ferry also connects the island with the Cowal Peninsula from the north-east of the island. An A-road runs along Bute's east coast and loops around the island's southern half; the northern half of the island is less well-served and can mostly only by traversed by foot or bike. Arran is also connected to the Scottish mainland by ferry; from the north one can reach Tarbert and Claonaig in Kintyre, and from Brodick ferries depart for Ardrossan in Ayrshire and Campbeltown further down the Kintyre Peninsula. A road goes around the edge of the island, with a B road cutting east–west across. A ferry also connects Great Cumbrae with Largs in Ayrshire.

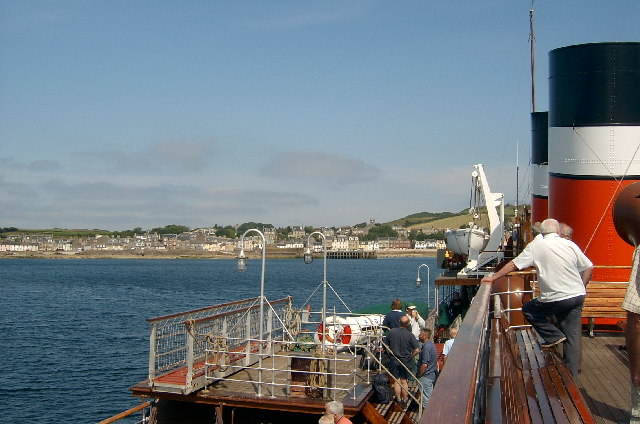
Approaching Millport, Great Cumbrae, on the PS Waverley.

== Parliamentary constituency ==
There was a Buteshire constituency of the House of Commons of the Parliament of Great Britain from 1708 to 1800 and of the Parliament of the United Kingdom from 1801 to 1918. Between 1708 and 1832 it was an alternating constituency with Caithness: one constituency elected a Member of Parliament (MP) to one parliament then the other elected an MP to the next. Between 1832 and 1918 it was a separate constituency, electing an MP to every parliament.

The population of Buteshire in 1841 was 15,740.

In 1918 the constituency was combined with the Ayrshire North constituency to form the Bute and Northern Ayrshire constituency, a constituency which straddled the boundary between the local government counties of Bute and Ayrshire.

In 1983, eight years after Scottish local government counties had been abolished, the Bute and Northern Ayrshire constituency was divided between the Argyll and Bute constituency and the Cunninghame North constituency.

In 2005, both constituencies were enlarged as part of the Fifth Periodic Review of Westminster constituencies. The name "Argyll and Bute" was retained, while the enlarged Cunningham North was renamed North Ayrshire and Arran.

Constituencies with similar boundaries to the pre-2005 constituencies, and also called Argyll and Bute and Cunninghame North, are used by the Scottish Parliament.

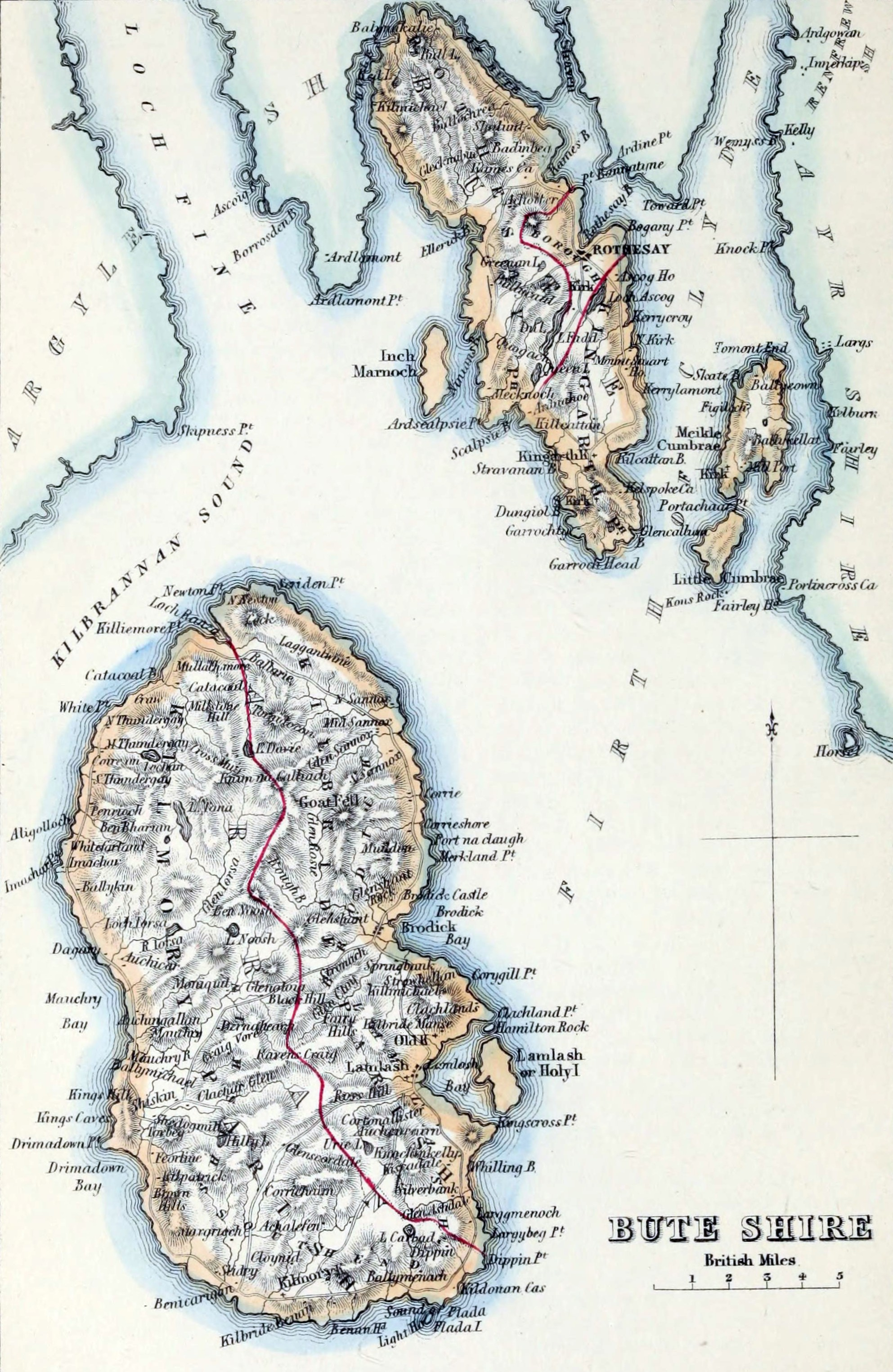
Buteshire

== Civil parishes ==
- North Bute
- Rothesay
- Kingarth
- Cumbraes or Great Cumbrae
- Kilbride, Arran
- Kilmory, Arran
- Lochranza

== List of places ==
Towns and places in Buteshire include:

=== Isle of Arran ===
- Blackwaterfoot
- Brodick
- Catacol
- Cladach
- Corrie
- Corriegills, Arran
- Dippen
- Kildonan
- Kilmory
- Kings Cross, Arran
- Lagg
- Lamlash
- Lochranza
- Machrie
- Pirnmill
- Sannox
- Shiskine
- Sliddery
- Whitefarland
- Whiting Bay

=== Isle of Bute ===
- Ardbeg
- Cladach
- Kilchattan Bay
- Kingarth
- Port Bannatyne
- Rhubodach
- Rothesay

=== The Cumbraes ===
- Millport

== Gallery ==
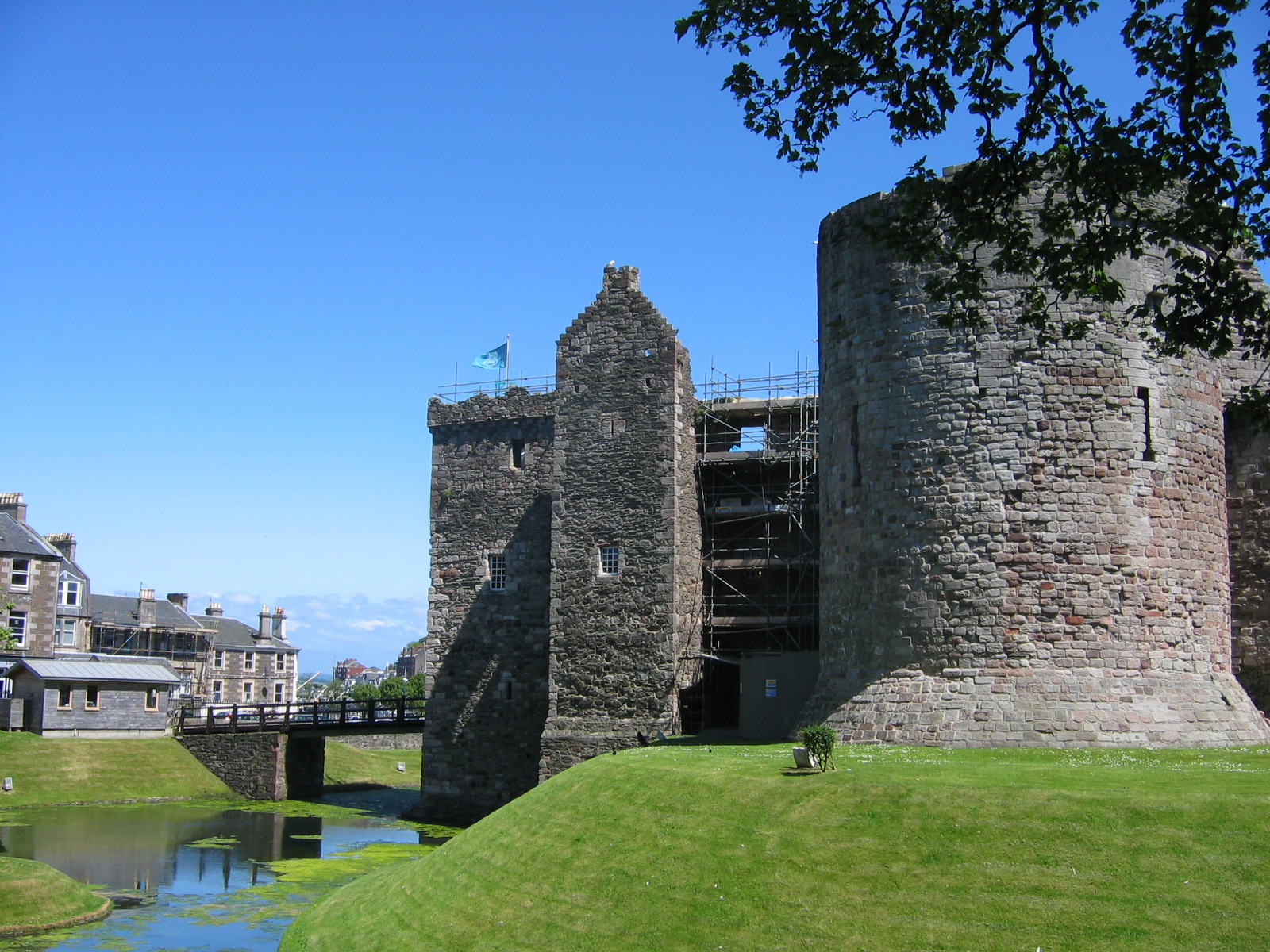
Rothesay Castle, Bute, with the 16th century forework in the centre, and the 13th century "Pigeon Tower" on the right

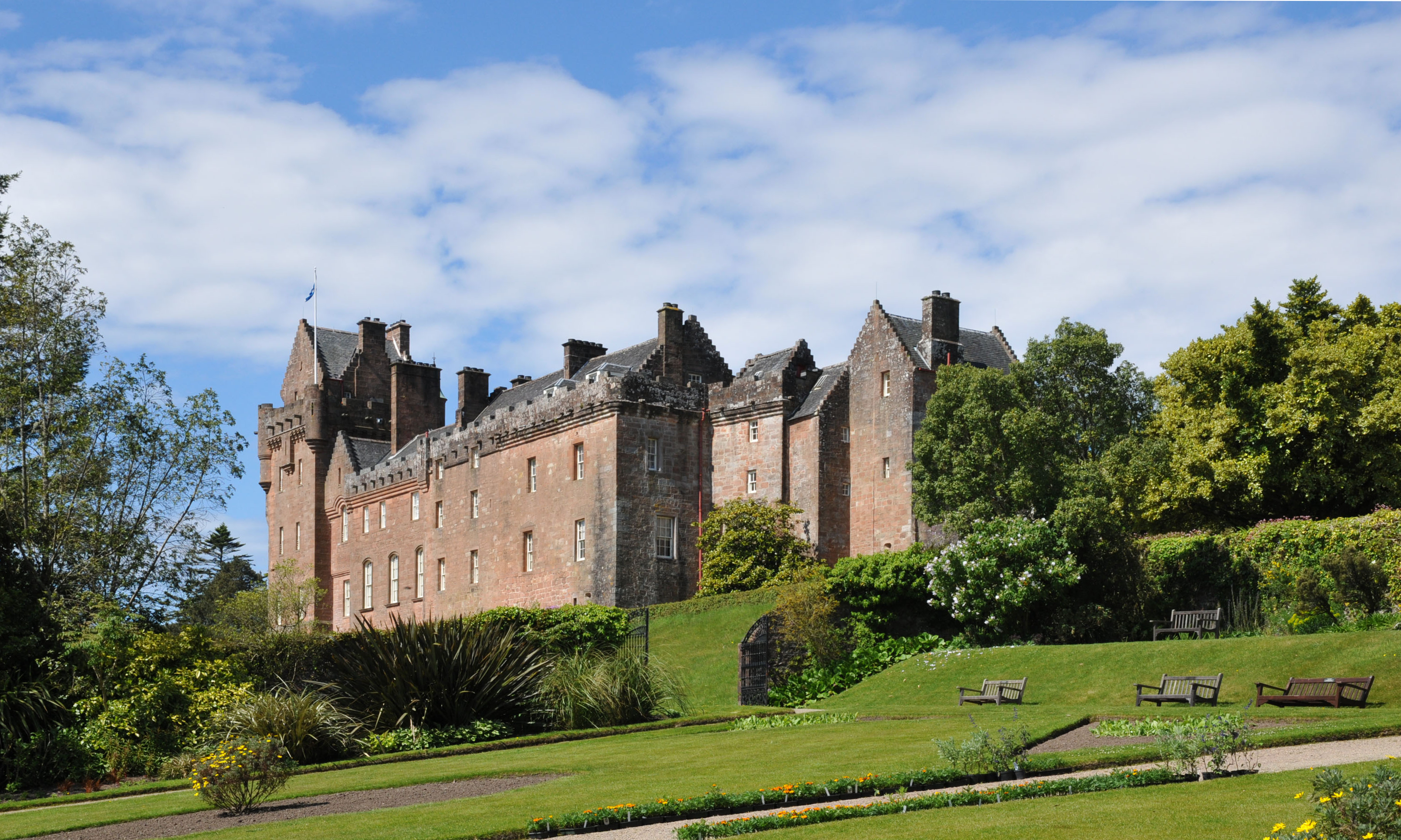
Brodick Castle, Arran

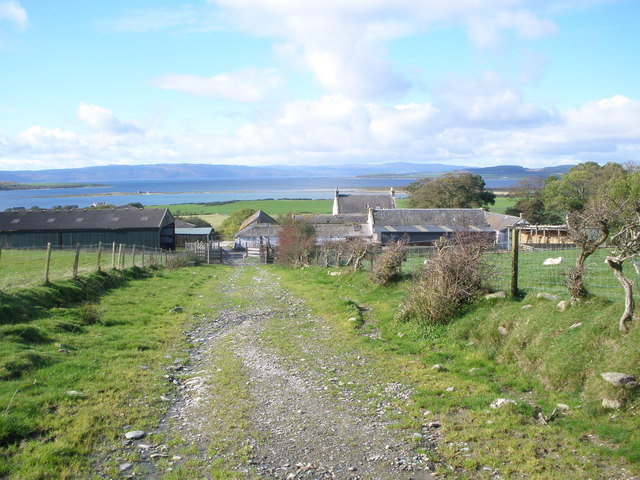
Kilmory Castle is incorporated into Meikle Kilmory Farm, Bute

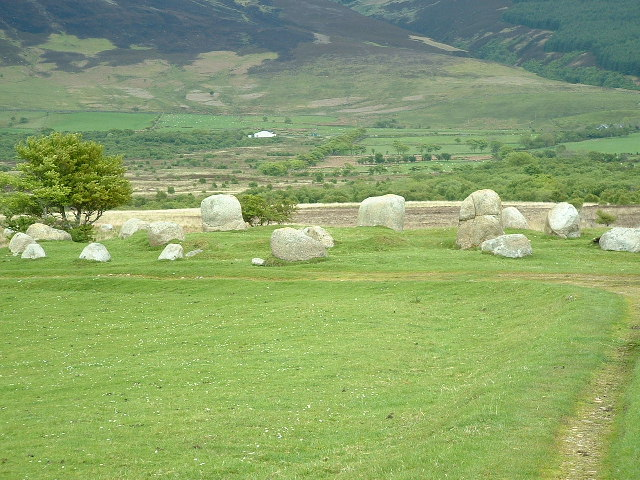
Machrie Moor Stone Circle, Arran

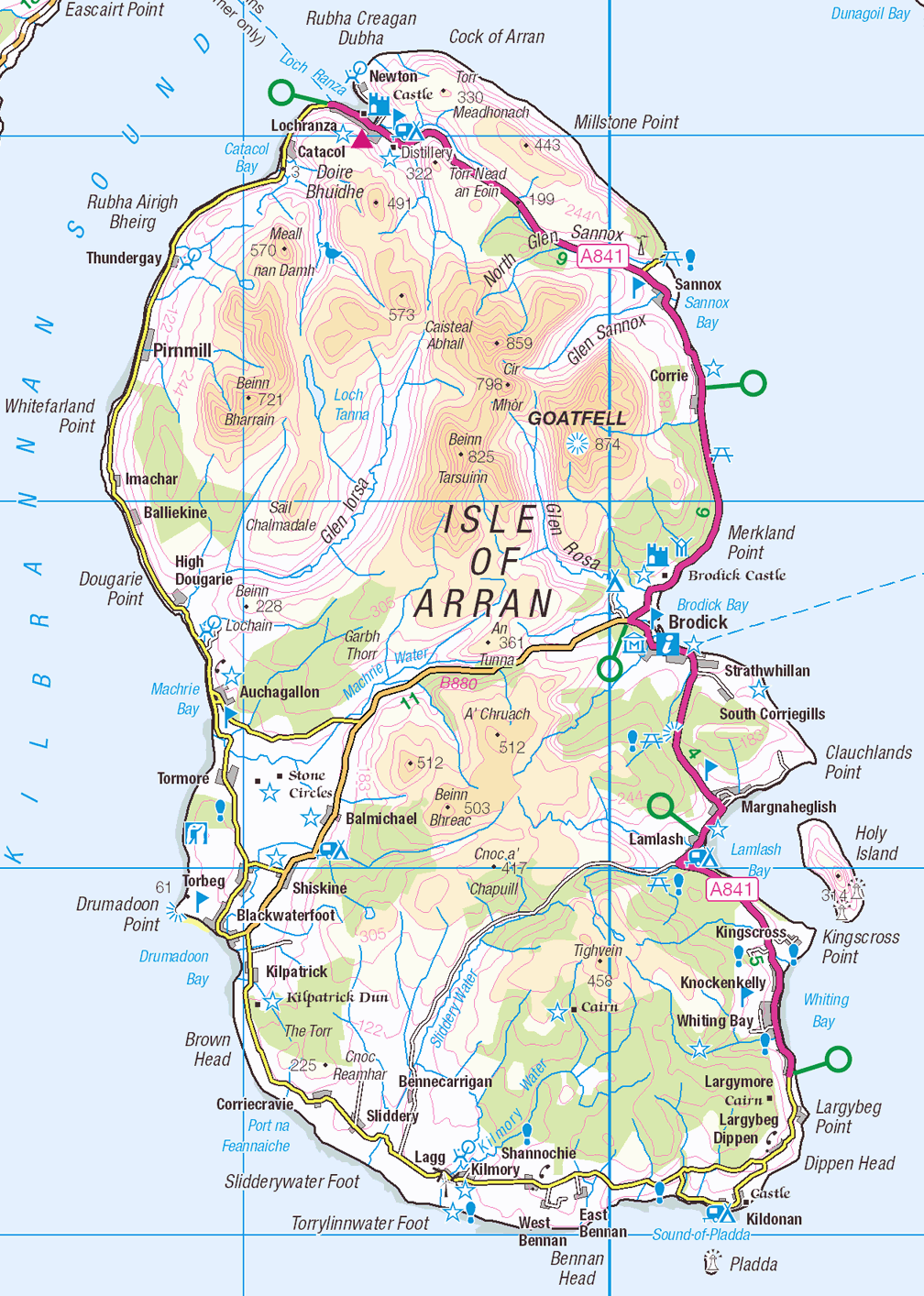
Isle of Arran

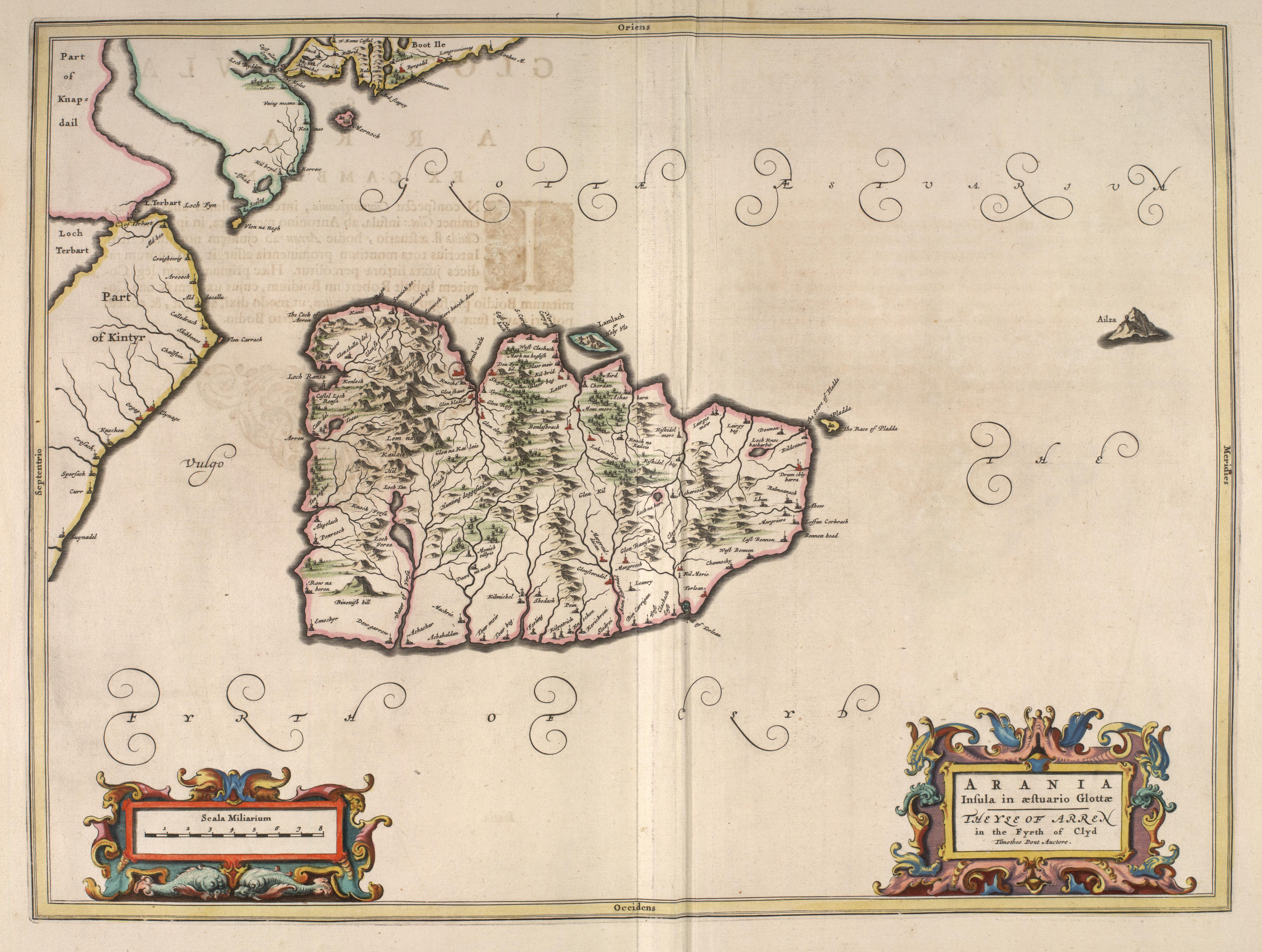
Blaeu Atlas. Arania

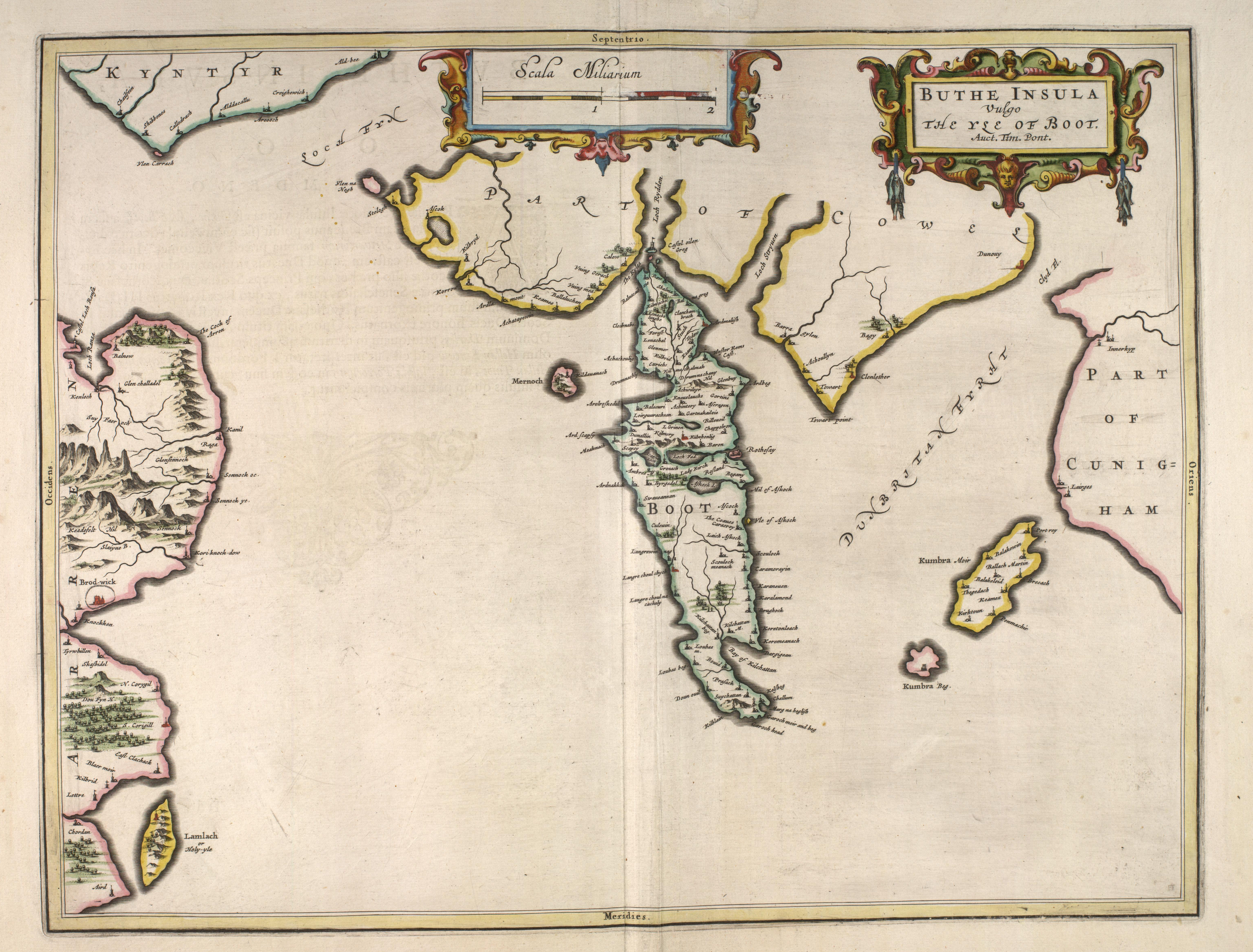
Blaeu Atlas. Buthe Insula

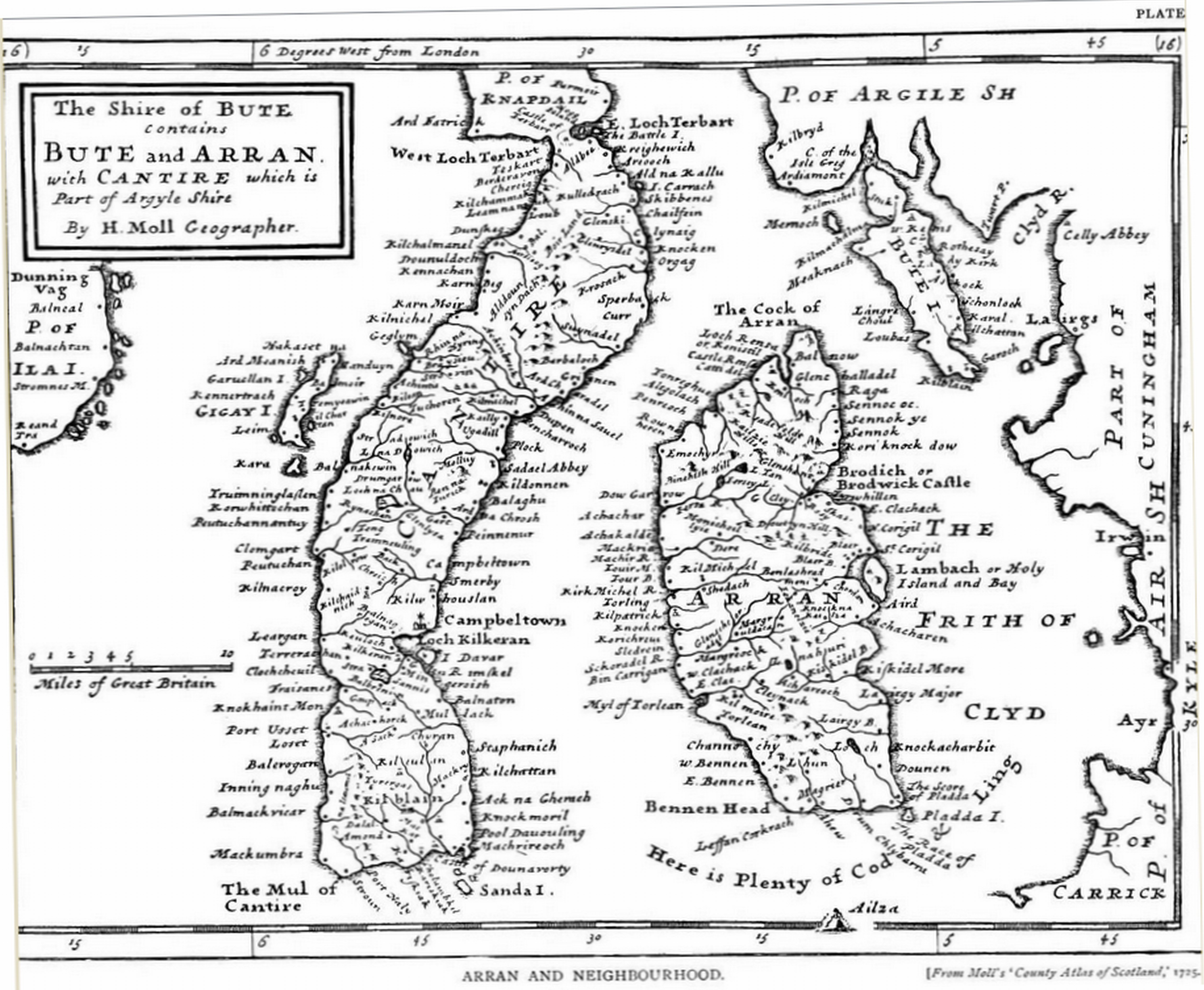
Shire of Bute. by H. Moll

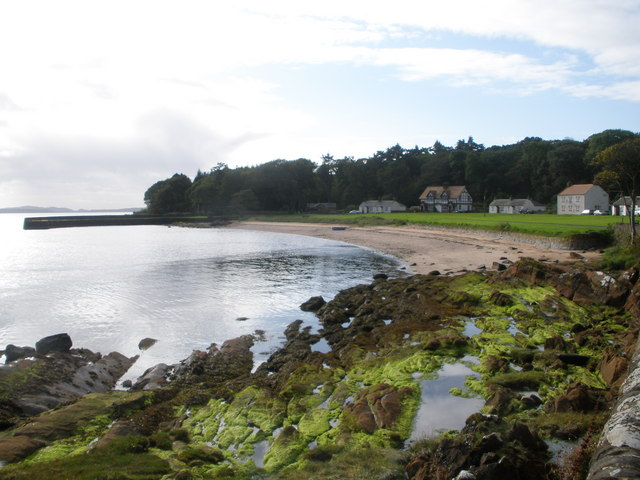
Kerrycroy Bay, Bute

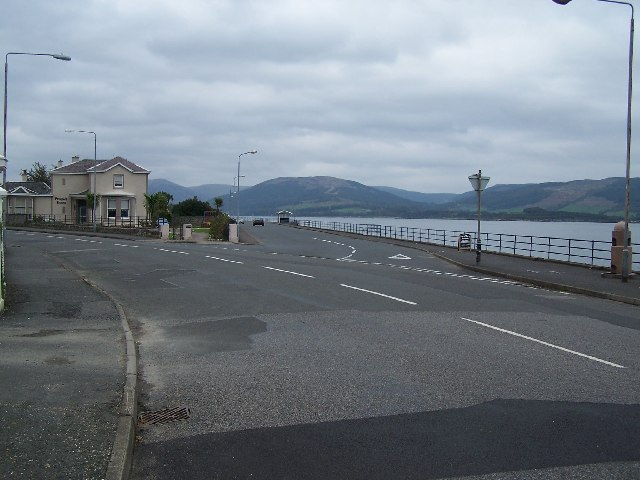
Ardbeg, Bute

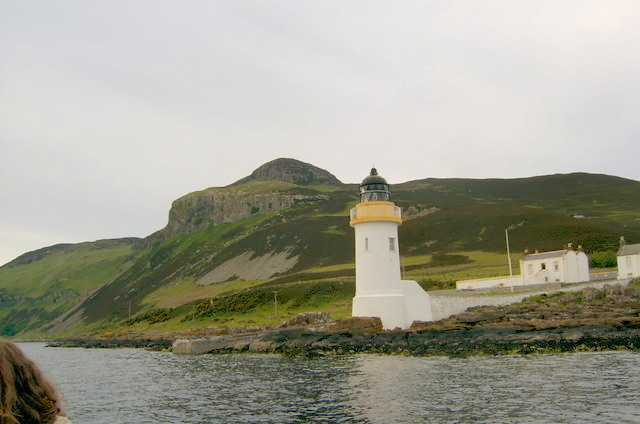
Lighthouse on Holy Island

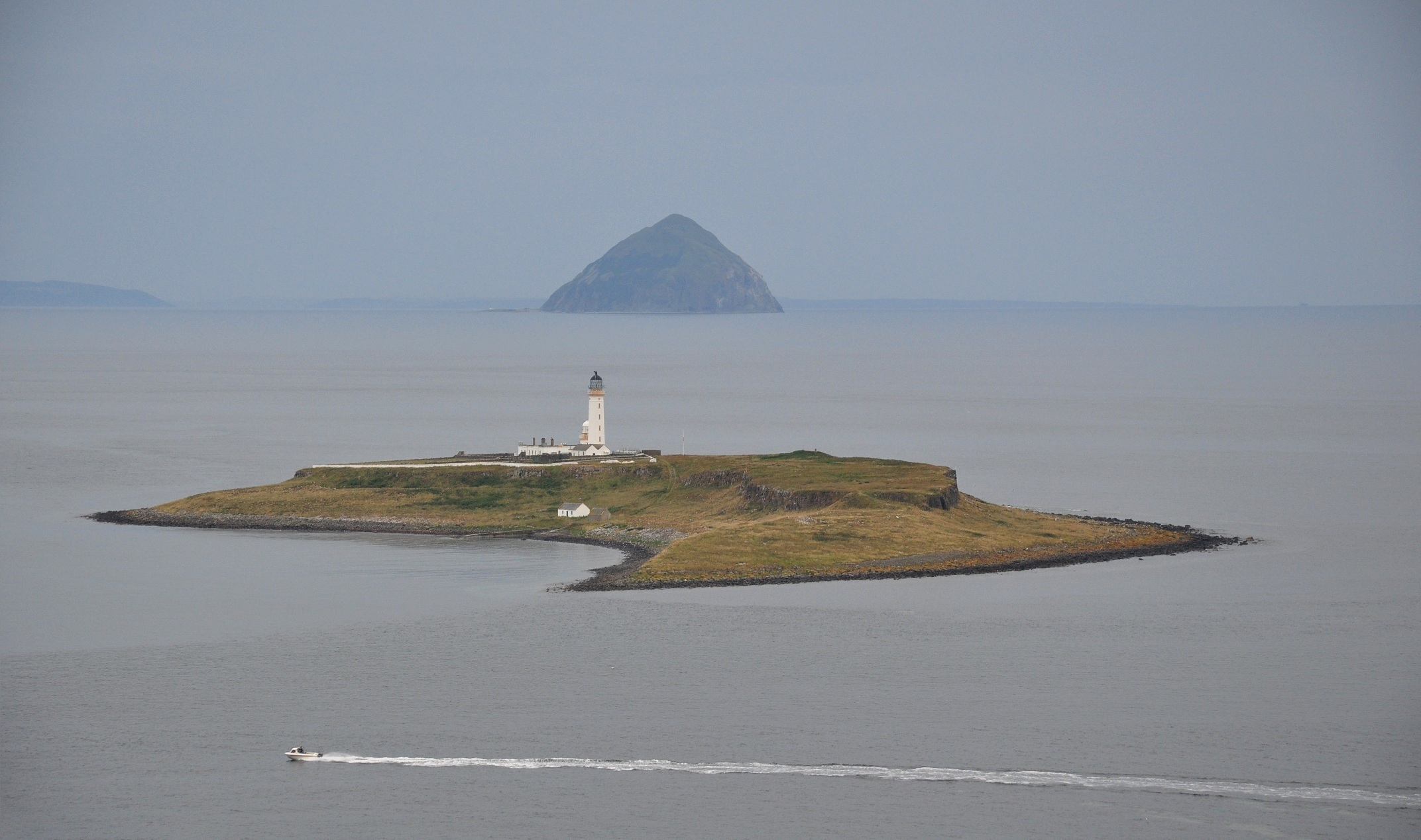
The isle of Pladda as seen from Arran, with Ailsa Craig in the distance

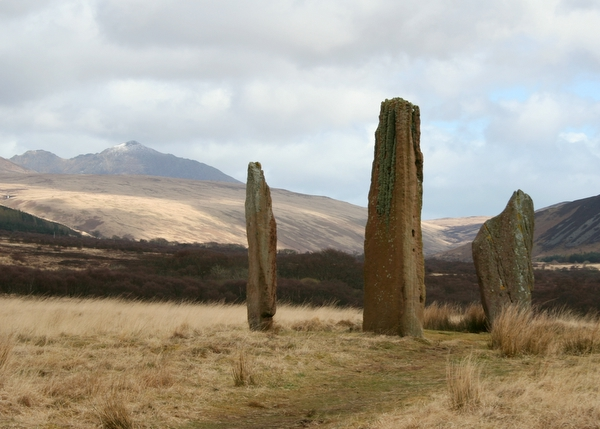
Machrie Moor Standing Stones on Arran

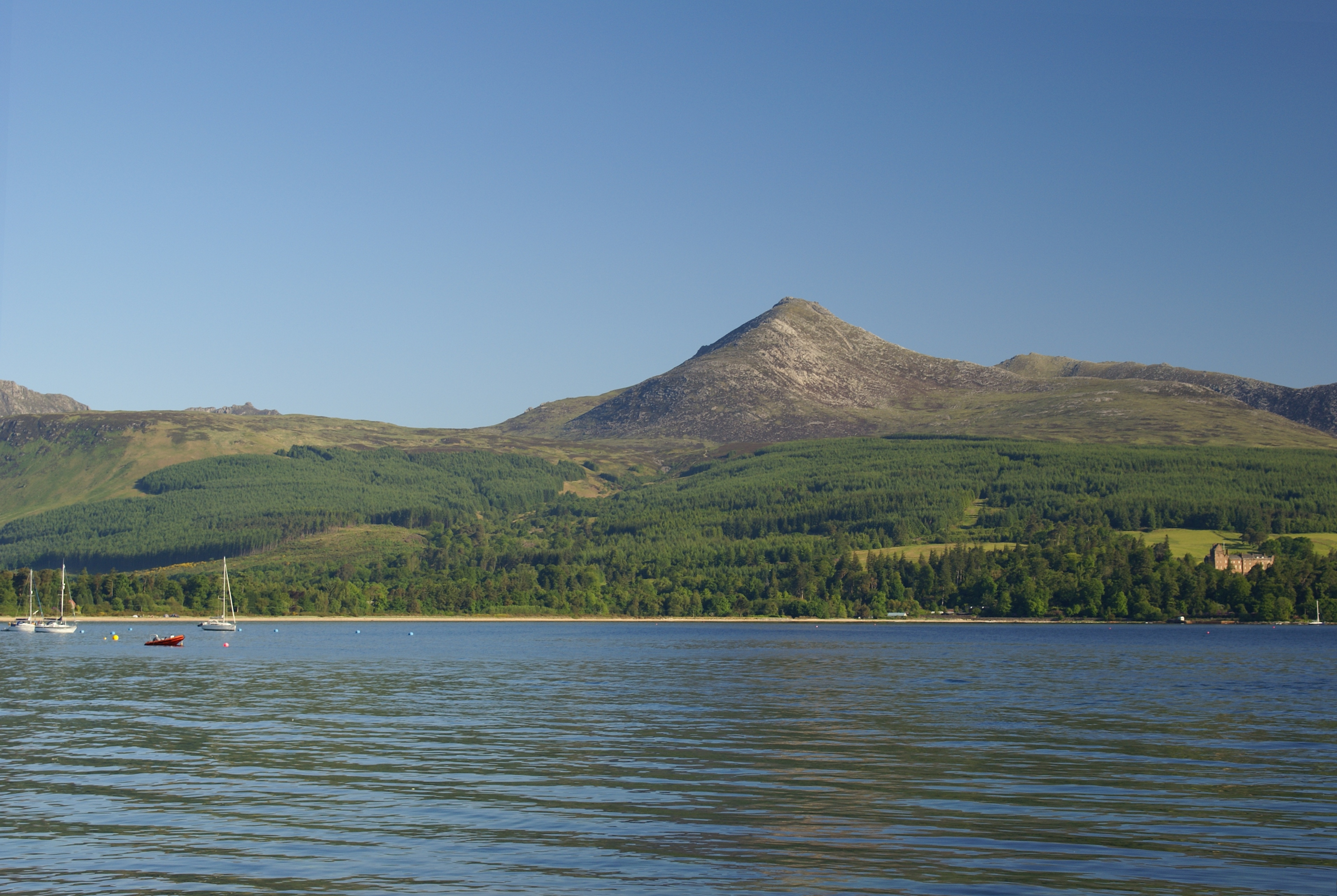
Goat Fell on Arran, the highest point of Buteshire

== See also ==
- List of counties of Scotland 1890–1975
