= List of shipwrecks in February 1882 =

The list of shipwrecks in February 1882 includes ships sunk, foundered, grounded, or otherwise lost during February 1882.

== 1 February ==
List of shipwrecks: 1 February 1882
| Ship | State | Description |
|---|---|---|
| Conatio | Germany | The steamship was sighted in the Dardanelles whilst on a voyage from Theodosia, Russia to Rotterdam, South Holland, Netherlands. No further trace, reported missing. |
| May Queen | United Kingdom | The ship was wrecked in the Rio Grande do Sul. Her crew survived. |

== 2 February ==
List of shipwrecks: 2 February 1882
| Ship | State | Description |
|---|---|---|
| Kirkconnell | United Kingdom | The barque ran aground off the Copeland Islands, County Down. She was on a voyage from Ardrossan, Ayrshire to Dublin. She floated off and was towed in to Belfast, County Antrim. |
| Western Empire | United States | The ship was abandoned in the Atlantic Ocean (37°00′N 37°16′W). Her crew were rescued by Canmore (United Kingdom). Western Empire was on a voyage from New York to Liverpool, Lancashire, United Kingdom. |

== 3 February ==
List of shipwrecks: 3 February 1882
| Ship | State | Description |
|---|---|---|
| Cosmo | United Kingdom | The steamship foundered in the Black Sea off the mouth of the Bosphorus with the loss of all 27 hands. She was on a voyage from Sebastopol, Russia to London. |
| Zeus | United Kingdom | The steamship ran aground on the Scroby Sands, Norfolk. She was on a voyage from Sunderland, County Durham to London. |

== 4 February ==
List of shipwrecks: 4 February 1882
| Ship | State | Description |
|---|---|---|
| Bunker Hill | United States | The schooner was wrecked on Bemo Ledges. Her crew were rescued. |
| Frankland | United Kingdom | The steamship collided with the steamship Justitia (Spain) and sank in the River Thames at Tilbury, Essex. |

== 5 February ==
List of shipwrecks: 5 February 1882
| Ship | State | Description |
|---|---|---|
| .Bellerophon | United States | The fishing schooner sank in a storm on the Georges Bank with the loss of all fourteen hands. |
| Bessie W. Somes | United States | The fishing schooner sank in a storm on the Georges Bank with the loss of all fourteen crew. |
| Charles Carroll | United States | The fishing schooner sank in a storm on the Georges Bank with the loss of all eleven hands. |
| Edith M. Pew | United States | The fishing schooner sank in a storm on the Georges Bank, possibly after a collision with Paul Revere (United States). Lost with all thirteen hands. |
| Paul Revere | United States | The fishing schooner sank in a storm on the Georges Bank, possibly in a collision with Edith M. Pew (United States). Lost with all fourteen hands. |

== 6 February ==
List of shipwrecks: 6 February 1882
| Ship | State | Description |
|---|---|---|
| Dorothy | United Kingdom | The ship departed from Pensacola, Florida, United States for the Clyde. No further trace, reported missing. |
| Manna | United Kingdom | The steamship was wrecked off Antiparos, Greece. |

== 7 February ==
List of shipwrecks: 7 February 1882
| Ship | State | Description |
|---|---|---|
| Sandringham | United Kingdom | The ship ran aground at King's Lynn, Norfolk. She was on a voyage from King's Lynn to Hamburg, Germany. |

== 8 February ==
List of shipwrecks: 8 February 1882
| Ship | State | Description |
|---|---|---|
| Gem | United States | The steamship burned to the waterline and sank off Appletree Cove. Two passengers and three crew were killed. |
| Tremo | Norway | The brig collided with the steamship Johanna (France) and sank in the English Channel off Beachy Head, Sussex, United Kingdom. |
| Unnamed | Spanish Navy | The gunboat sank in a storm at Buenos Aires, Argentina. |
| Unnamed | French Navy | The gunboat was driven ashore at Buenos Aires. |
| Several unnamed vessels | Flags unknown | The ships foundered at Buenos Aires. |

== 9 February ==
List of shipwrecks: 9 February 1882
| Ship | State | Description |
|---|---|---|
| Chimborazo | United Kingdom | The barque was wrecked 30 miles (48 km) south of "Egmont West", Florida, United States. |
| Lizett | Germany | The brigantine was wrecked near Petty Harbour, Newfoundland Colony with the loss of five of her nine crew. |

== 10 February ==
List of shipwrecks: 10 February 1882
| Ship | State | Description |
|---|---|---|
| Bahamas | United States | The ship sank in the Atlantic Ocean. She was on a voyage from Puerto Rico to New York. |

== 12 February ==
List of shipwrecks: 12 February 1882
| Ship | State | Description |
|---|---|---|
| Georges | United Kingdom | The schooner was driven ashore at Queenstown, County Cork. Her crew were rescued. |
| John Morrison | United Kingdom | The schooner was driven ashore at Roche's Point, County Cork. Her crew were rescued. |
| O. B. Suhr | Denmark | The steamship was driven ashore on Skagen. She was later refloated. |

== 13 February ==
List of shipwrecks: February 1882
| Ship | State | Description |
|---|---|---|
| Alf | United Kingdom | The ship departed from London for Trondheim, Norway. No further trace, reported overdue. |
| Ashbrooke | United Kingdom | The steamship ran aground in the Suez Canal. She was on a voyage from Penarth, Glamorgan to Galle, Ceylon. |
| Essex | United Kingdom | The steamship collided with a buoy in the River Thames and was holed. She was beached at Rosherville, Kent. She was on a voyage from London to Colchester, Essex. |
| Sole Bay | United Kingdom | The schooner collided with the steamship Eskdale (United Kingdom) and sank off Hartlepool, County Durham. Her crew were rescued. Sole Bay was on a voyage from Hartlepool to Scarborough, Yorkshire. |

== 14 February ==
List of shipwrecks: 14 February 1882
| Ship | State | Description |
|---|---|---|
| Constantine | United Kingdom | The barque was abandoned in the Atlantic Ocean. Her crew were rescued by the brigantine Hama (Germany). Constantine was on a voyage from Pensacola, Florida, United States to Grangemouth, Stirlingshire, United Kingdom. |
| Gannet | United Kingdom | The steamship ran ashore at Newhaven, East Sussex. Her 36 crew were rescued. Gannet was on a voyage from Calcutta, India to London. She broke up on 1 March and was a total loss. |

== 15 February ==
List of shipwrecks: 15 February 1882
| Ship | State | Description |
|---|---|---|
| Euphemia Fullerton, and W. G. Grant | United Kingdom | The schooner W. G. Grant ran into Euphemia Fullarton off Troon, Ayrshire. Both vessels were severely damaged. W. G. Grant was on a voyage from Ardrossan, Ayrshire to Belfast, County Antrim. |
| Rosebud | United Kingdom | The steamship collided with Lady Olive (United Kingdom) 3 nautical miles (5.6 km) south of the Longships, Cornwall. Four crew lost their lives. Rosebud was on a voyage from Newport, Monmouthshire to Lisbon, Portugal |

== 16 February ==
List of shipwrecks: 16 February 1882
| Ship | State | Description |
|---|---|---|
| Erndte | Germany | The steamship was driven ashore at Libava, Courland Governorate. |
| Harmonie | Russia | The barque was driven ashore at Libava. She was on a voyage from Torrevieja, Spain to Libava. |
| Wolofte | Denmark | The steamship was driven ashore at Libava. She was on a voyage from Svendborg to Libava. |

== 17 February ==
List of shipwrecks: 17 February 1882
| Ship | State | Description |
|---|---|---|
| Fisher | United Kingdom | The ship departed from South Shields, County Durham for Stockholm, Sweden. No further trace, reported missing. |

== 19 February ==
List of shipwrecks: 19 February 1882
| Ship | State | Description |
|---|---|---|
| Louisa | United Kingdom | The smack foundered in the North Sea with the loss of all hands. |
| Mary Ann | United Kingdom | The Thames barge was run into by the steamship Dafila (United Kingdom) and sank in the River Thames near Northfleet, Kent with the loss of one of her two crew. |

== 20 February ==
List of shipwrecks: 20 February 1882
| Ship | State | Description |
|---|---|---|
| Alexandria | United Kingdom | The barque was abandoned at sea. Her crew were rescued by Ermsterl (Netherlands) on 28 February. |

== 21 February ==
List of shipwrecks: 21 February 1882
| Ship | State | Description |
|---|---|---|
| Portugalete | United Kingdom | The steamship ran aground and sank off the Bull Point Lighthouse, Devon. Her crew were rescued by the tug Oberon (United Kingdom). Portugalete was on a voyage from Bilbao, Spain to Cardiff, Glamorgan. |
| Magdala | United Kingdom | The ship departed from Penarth, Glamorgan for Ternate, Netherlands East Indies. No further trace, reported overdue. |
| Unnamed | United Kingdom | The smack was run down and sunk in the North Sea by the fishing vessel Dogger Bank (Netherlands). |

== 23 February ==
List of shipwrecks: 23 February 1882
| Ship | State | Description |
|---|---|---|
| Bassac | France | The steamship was wrecked in the Red Sea 8 nautical miles (15 km) north of Ras Ghareb, Egypt. Her crew were taken off by an Egyptian Government steamship on 7 March. She was on a voyage from the Clyde to Saigon, French Indo-China. |
| Holyrood | United Kingdom | The steamship foundered with the loss of all 37 crew. She was on a voyage from Saigon, French Indo-China to Singapore, Straits Settlements. |
| Johan | Sweden | The ship was wrecked at East London, Cape Colony. She was on a voyage from Gothenburg to the Cape of Good Hope, Cape Colony. |

== 25 February ==
List of shipwrecks: 25 February 1882
| Ship | State | Description |
|---|---|---|
| Auguste | Germany | The brigantine ran ashore in Whitsand Bay and became a total wreck. Her crew survived. |
| Bertie Claiborne | United States | The steamship was destroyed by fire. Three children were killed. |
| Citizen | United Kingdom | The ship was abandoned in the Irish Sea off Holyhead, Anglesey. Her crew were rescued by the steamship Ligurian (Flag unknown). Citizen was on a voyage from Barrow in Furness, Lancashire to Newport, Monmouthshire. |
| Frank | United Kingdom | The Thames barge was run down and sunk in the River Thames by the steamship RMS Derwent (United Kingdom) with the loss of one of her four crew. Survivors were rescued by RMS Derwent. Frank was on a voyage from Swanscombe, Kent to Westminster, London. |
| Lucy | United Kingdom | The brig ran aground on the Gunfleet Sand, in the North Sea off the coast of Essex. Her crew were rescued. She was on a voyage from Hartlepool, County Durham to London. |
| Woodville | United Kingdom | The ship ran aground on the Blackwater Bank, in the Irish Sea. Three crew took to a boat and were drowned when it was swamped. She was on a voyage from Liverpool, Lancashire to Otago, New Zealand. She was refloated and towed in to Holyhead by Stratheyre (United Kingdom). |
| No. 9 | United Kingdom | The pilot boat collided with the steamship Mariner (United Kingdom) and sank off the Bar Lightship ( Trinity House) with the loss of one of the 25 people on board. Survivors were rescued by Mariner. |

== 26 February ==
List of shipwrecks: 26 February 1882
| Ship | State | Description |
|---|---|---|
| Dextrous | United Kingdom | The barque was wrecked at Pooree, India. She was on a voyage from Cocanada to Gopaulpore, India. |
| Gipsy Queen | United Kingdom | The sloop was driven ashore near Campbeltown, Argyllshire. |
| Vanguard | United Kingdom | The steamship departed from Lisbon, Portugal for London. No further trace, reported missing. |

== 27 February ==
List of shipwrecks: 27 February 1882
| Ship | State | Description |
|---|---|---|
| Bancoora | United Kingdom | The steamship was driven ashore in the Hooghly River downstream of Mud Point. She was on a voyage from Calcutta to Bombay, India. She was refloated and resumed her voyage. |
| Brothers | United Kingdom | The ship was driven ashore and wrecked on Pladda. Her crew survived. She was on a voyage from Glenarm, County Antrim to Ardrossan, Ayrshire. |
| Canada | Norway | The barque was driven ashore at Berwick upon Tweed, Northumberland, United Kingdom. Her crew were rescued by rocket apparatus. She was on a voyage from Doboy, Georgia, United States to Kragerøe. She was a total loss. |
| Jane Gwynne | United Kingdom | The schooner was driven ashore at Whitefarland, Isle of Arran. |
| Martha | United Kingdom | The ketch sprang a leak and foundered in the North Sea 5 nautical miles (9.3 km) east of North Sunderland, Berwickshire. Her crew were rescued. |
| Mary McCall | United Kingdom | The sloop was driven ashore and wrecked at Carradale, Isle of Arran. |
| Normanby | Canada | The ship was abandoned in the Atlantic Ocean. Her ten crew were rescued by Sarah M. Smith ( Canada). Normanby was on a voyage from Antwerp, Belgium to Galveston, Texas, United States. |

== 28 February ==
List of shipwrecks: 28 February 1882
| Ship | State | Description |
|---|---|---|
| Livadia | United Kingdom | The steamship ran aground on the Cross Sands, in the North Sea off the coast of Norfolk with the loss of 23 of her 24 crew. The survivor was rescued by the Gorleston Volunteer Lifeboat. She was on a voyage from South Shields, County Durham to Alexandria, Egypt. |
| Oweenee | United Kingdom | The ship departed from Londonderry for Baltimore, Maryland, United States. No further trace, reported missing. |

== Unknown date ==
List of shipwrecks: Unknown date in February 1882
| Ship | State | Description |
|---|---|---|
| Briton | United Kingdom | The brig was wrecked at Maryport, Cumberland with the loss of all four crew. |
| Cabot | United Kingdom | The barque foundered after 10 February. She was on a voyage from Newcastle upon Tyne, Northumberland, United Kingdom to Stavanger. The body of her captain and wreckage from the ship washed up on the island of "Routh", 8 nautical miles (15 km) from Stavanger. |
| Chilian | United Kingdom | The steamship was driven ashore on Salamanca Island, off the mouth of the Magdalena River. Her crew survived. She was refloated on 10 June and taken in to Savanilla, United States of Colombia. |
| Constantine | Germany | The barque was abandoned in the Atlantic Ocean with the loss of two of her thirteen crew. Survivors were rescued by the barque Emma (Norway). Constantine was on a voyage from New York, United States to Danzig. |
| Costa Rica | United Kingdom | The brig was abandoned at sea. She drove ashore on Skagen, Denmark and was wrecked. |
| Cyenus | United Kingdom | The steamship departed from Cardiff, Glamorgan for Port Said, Egypt. No further trace, presumed foundered with the loss of all 24 crew. |
| Dawn | United Kingdom | The steamship was driven ashore and wrecked on Tobago. |
| Elida | Portugal | The ship ran aground in the Schuylkill River. She was on a voyage from Lisbon to Philadelphia, Pennsylvania, United States. |
| Febo | Italy | The barque was wrecked at Santo António, Cape Verde Islands. She was on a voyage from Cardiff to São Vicente, Cape Verde Islands. |
| Harriet | United Kingdom | The ship was driven ashore and wrecked at Pouch Cove, Newfoundland Colony. She was on a voyage from Demerara, British Guiana to Saint John's, Newfoundland Colony. |
| Henrik | Sweden | The barque collided with another vessel and sank in the Gulf of Mexico before 5 February with the loss of six of her crew. She was on a voyage from Rouen, Seine-Inférieure, France to Pensacola, Florida, United States. |
| Iona | United Kingdom | The ship ran aground on the Heriot Rocks, off Inchkeith, Fife on or before 11 February. |
| Lochiel | United Kingdom | The schooner was driven ashore in the Bangka Strait before 13 February. She was on a voyage from Singapore, Straits Settlements to Mauritius. She was refloated and resumed her voyage. |
| Lois | Canada | The full-rigged ship ran aground and sank on the Shipwash Sand, in the North Sea off the coast of Suffolk, United Kingdom. She was on a voyage from Rotterdam, South Holland, Netherlands to an American port. |
| Margaretha | Germany | The ship was driven ashore on Long Island, New York, United States. She was on a voyage from Bremen to New York City, New York. She subsequently broke up. |
| Ranee | United Kingdom | The steamship ran aground at New Brighton, Cheshire. She was on a voyage from Liverpool, Lancashire to Stanley, Falkland Islands. She was refloated on 7 February. |
| Romeo | United Kingdom | The barque was wrecked on Gabo Island, Victoria. Her crew were rescued. She was on a voyage from Hamburg, Germany to Sydney, New South Wales. |
| Stapnaes | Norway | The schooner was driven ashore and severely damaged near Egersund. She was on a voyage from Halmstad, Sweden to Newcastle upon Tyne. She was refloated with assistance but was consequently condemned. |
| Strathgarry | United Kingdom | The steamship was driven ashore at Nethertown, Cumberland. She was on a voyage from Dublin to Whitehaven, Cumberland. |
| T. E. Fisher | United Kingdom | The ship was driven ashore at "Camargil", Brazil. She was on a voyage from Santos to Pernambuco, Brazil. She was a total loss. |
| Thor | Norway | The ship was abandoned at sea before 3 February. Her crew were rescued by Neptuno (Flag unknown). Thor was on a voyage from London, United Kingdom to New York. She was subsequently discovered by Augusta (Norway), which put three crew aboard with the intention of taking her in to Queenstown, County Cork, United Kingdom. Thor was driven ashore in Whiting Bay, County Waterford, United Kingdom on 9 February. The three people on board were rescued. |
| Tiber | United Kingdom | The steamship was wrecked at Puerto Plata, Dominican Republic. All on board were rescued. |
| Tsernogora | United Kingdom | The ship was damaged by fire at Havre de Grâce, Seine-Inférieure, France after 22 February. |
| Valetta | United Kingdom | The ship ran aground near Hellevoet, Zeeland, Netherlands. She was on a voyage from Benisaf to Rotterdam. |
| Westport | New Zealand | The steamship struck a submerged object and sank at Westport. |
| William G. Mosley | United States | The ship was abandoned in the Atlantic Ocean. |
