= Grogport =

Coordinates: 55°38′32″N 5°29′1″W

Grogport: Scottish Gaelic: Gròb-phort
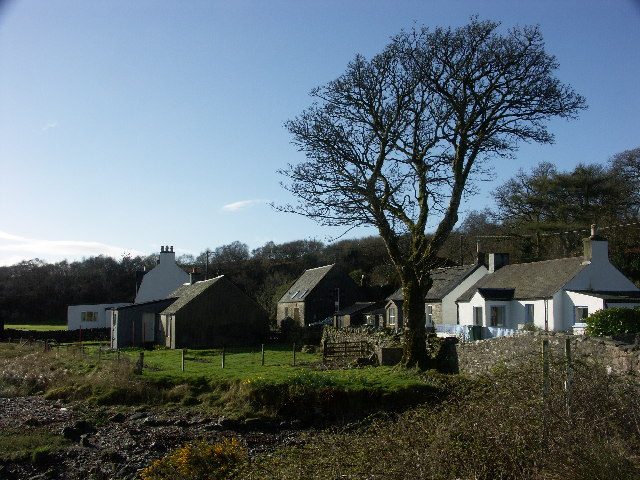
- Grogport

- Location within Argyll and Bute
- Council area: Argyll and Bute
- Lieutenancy area: Argyll and Bute
- Country: Scotland
- Sovereign state: United Kingdom
- Post town: CAMPBELTOWN
- Postcode district: PA28
- Police: Scotland
- Fire: Scottish
- Ambulance: Scottish
- UK Parliament: Argyll, Bute and South Lochaber
- Scottish Parliament: Argyll and Bute

Grogport (Scottish Gaelic: Gròb-phort) is a hamlet in Argyll and Bute, Scotland. It lies on the coast of Kintyre, on the Kilbrannan Sound, across from Pirnmill on the Isle of Arran.

On the coast side of the B842 road that runs through Grogport, there is a picnic spot on the beach, with views of Arran across the water. On the other side of the road lies the remnants of a Bronze Age Cist, a stone burial chamber. The Cist is known locally as "The Sailor's Grave" and is estimated to date to approximately 2000 BC.

== Gallery ==
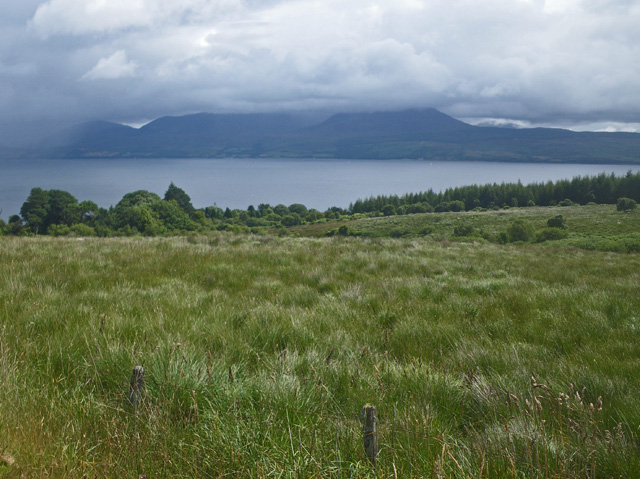
Coastal grassland south of Grogport.
