= Cladach =

Settlement on the Isle of Arran, Scotland

Coordinates: 55.592°N 5.154°W

Cladach: Scottish Gaelic: An Cladach
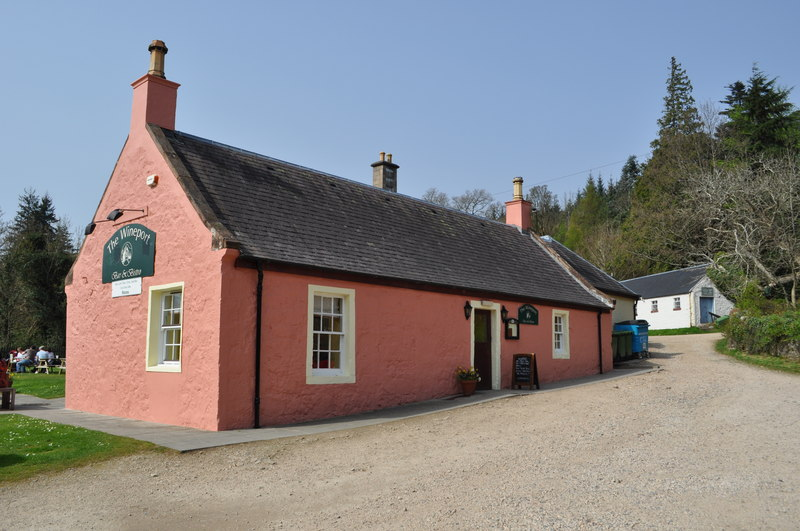
- The Wineport

- Location within North Ayrshire
- OS grid reference: NS012376
- Civil parish: Kilbride
- Council area: North Ayrshire
- Lieutenancy area: Ayrshire and Arran
- Country: Scotland
- Sovereign state: United Kingdom
- Post town: ISLE OF ARRAN
- Postcode district: KA27
- Dialling code: 01770
- Police: Scotland
- Fire: Scottish
- Ambulance: Scottish
- UK Parliament: North Ayrshire and Arran
- Scottish Parliament: Cunninghame North

Note: Cladach is a general Scottish Gaelic word for "beach" or "shore" and occurs in many Scottish placenames

Cladach (Scottish Gaelic: An Cladach) is a tiny settlement on the Isle of Arran, Scotland. The settlement is within the parish of Kilbride. In the vicinity of the island's main village, Brodick, Cladach is the site of the Cladach Sawmill and in more recent times, the Arran Brewery. The company, Arran Aromatics is located nearby, as is Brodick Castle.

== History ==
Cladach was in the past a much larger settlement, and was in fact the site of the original village on Brodick Bay, with modern Brodick being built on the south side of the Bay later. There were in the past a series of houses on the Coast Road in Cladach, but they were demolished many years ago.

There were also a series of houses that were let to employees of the sawmill by the sawmill owners. However, in recent years Cladach has essentially been depopulated and the buildings that used to house residents either demolished or converted into small businesses.

== Geography ==
Cladach sits on the eastern coast of the Isle of Arran, off the Coast Road across the Brodick Bay from Brodick.

== Economy ==
The Cladach Visitors' Centre is now the main attraction on the site of Cladach.

Cladach is the usual starting point for climbers who seek to ascend Goat Fell mountain. An entrance into Brodick Castle Gardens is also located in Cladach.

There is a hydroelectric scheme based at Cladach. Water is taken from a reservoir at around 800 ft on the slopes of Goat Fell and electricity is generated at the turbines behind the Sawmill. The original electricity generation was for the Castle which was one of the first places in Scotland to receive electricity along with the Castle on Rùm.

A courthouse, which was demolished in 2004, used to post important messages about hearings and agriculture on an Ash tree outside its doors. Locals still put posters up advertising events, which echo this long held tradition.

The restaurant is called the Wineport, named after the former port 500 yards north, a small harbour which was where supplies for the village and castle were landed.
