= Arran hydro-electric schemes =

Power stations on Arran, Firth of Clyde, Scotland

Arran Hydro-Electric Schemes
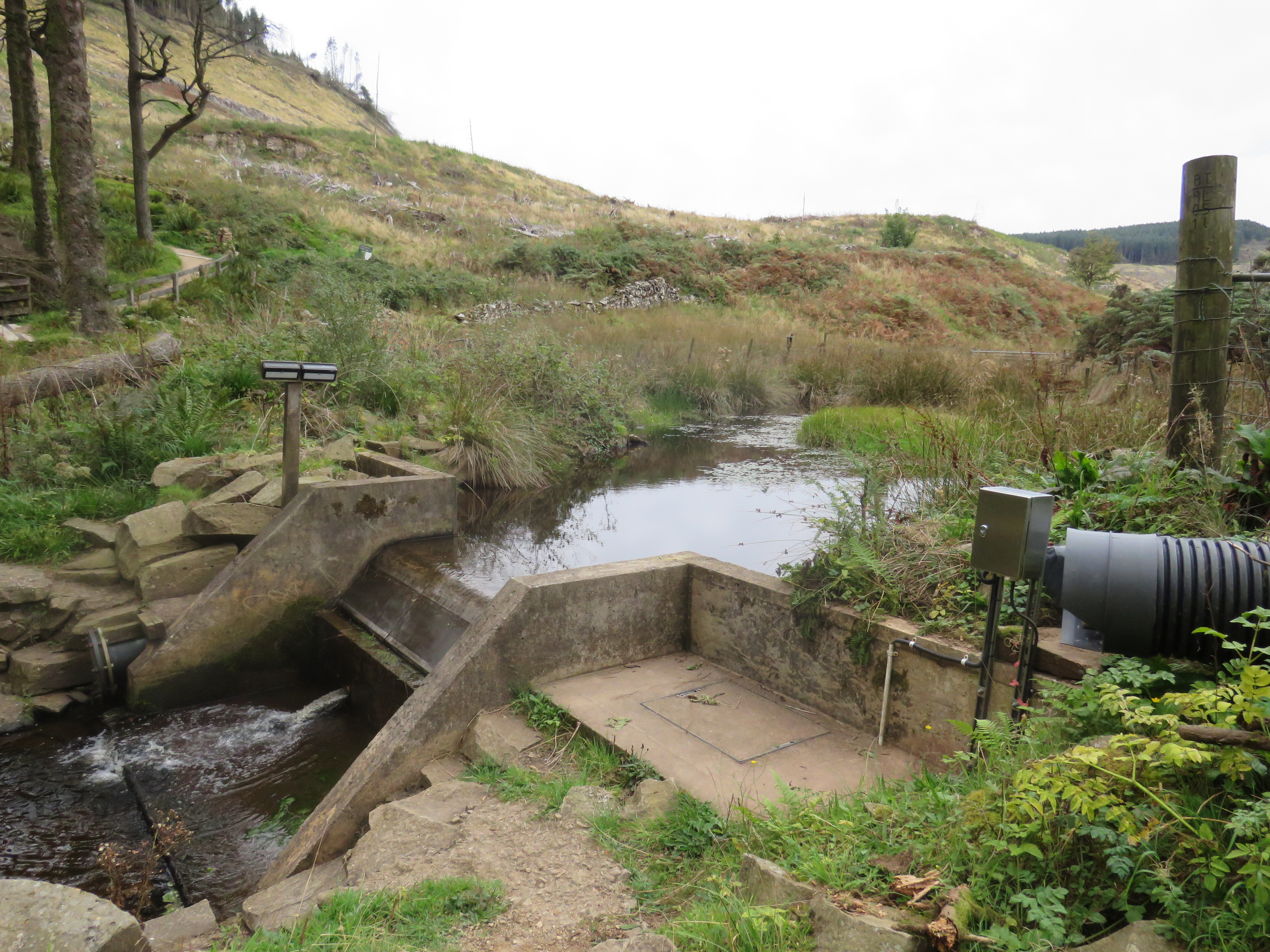
- The intake for the Eas Mor Hydro-Electric Scheme

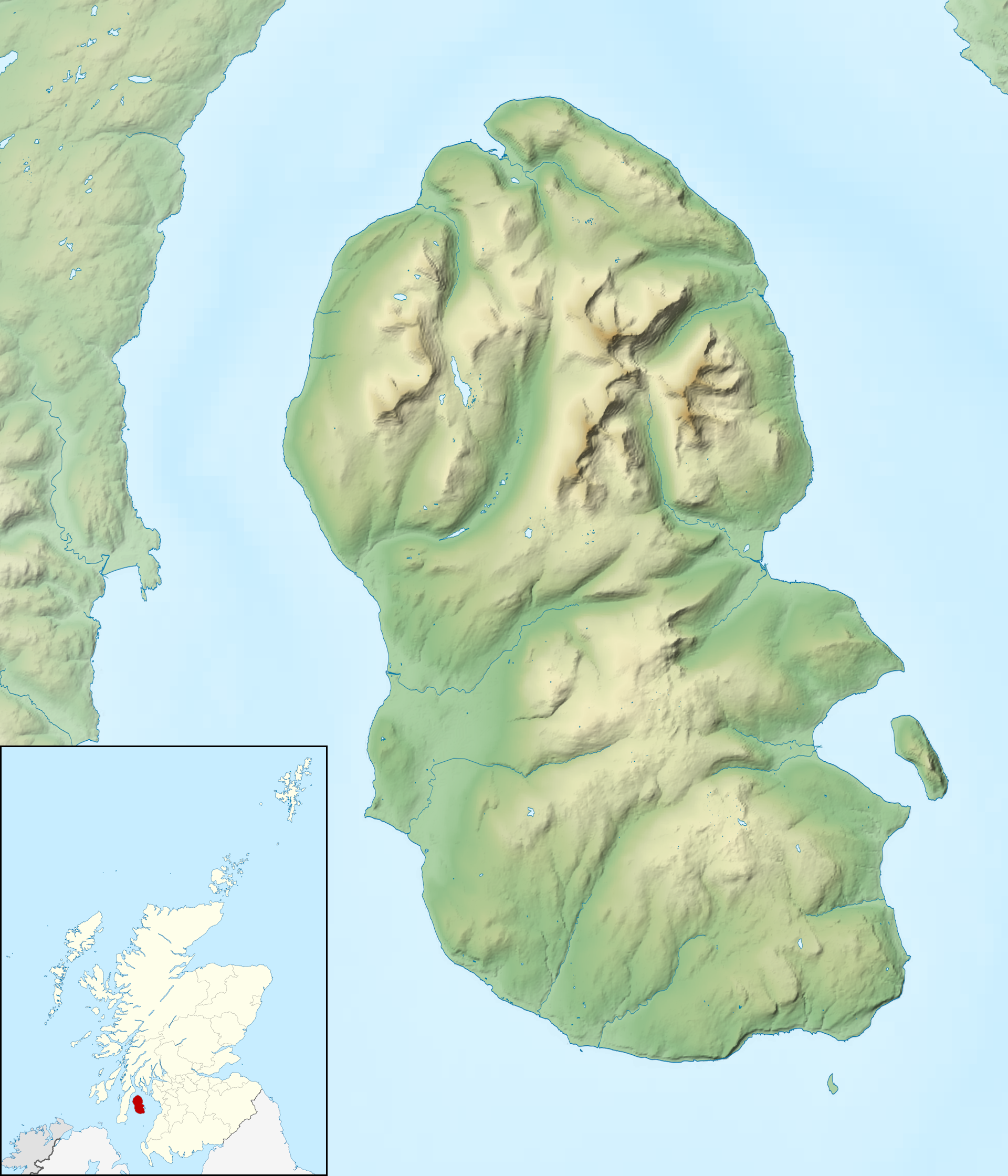
- Location within Arran
- Country: Scotland
- Location: Isle of Arran
- Coordinates: 55.592°N 5.155°W
- Purpose: Power
- Status: Operational

There are four hydro-electric schemes on the Isle of Arran, an island in the Firth of Clyde, Scotland. Three were installed during the early 21st century, but the first on the island was installed in 1909.

== Electricity supply ==
Brodick Castle was the first residence on the Isle of Arran to benefit from an electricity supply, when the owners installed a private turbine in 1909. The next development was the creation of the Arran Power and Light Company which began operating in 1933, initially supplying just the village of Brodick. Following the creation of the North of Scotland Hydro-Electric Board in 1943, they became responsible for electricity supply on the island in the early 1950s, and this resulted in the price paid by consumers dropping significantly, from 7.86 pence per unit to 1.80 pence per unit. The number of people using electricity rose rapidly, from 577 consumers prior to the Board taking over to 1,643 by April 1952.

Although the National Grid was developed from 1926 to supply consumers on the mainland of Britain, connections to the islands did not occur until much later. Arran is connected to it by two submarine cables that run across the Kilbrannan Sound from Carradale on the Kintyre Peninsula to Balliekine on the west coast of Arran. They are known as the north cable and south cable, as they follow different routes between the places where they reach land, and both operate at 33kV. The north cable, which was installed in 1993, was found to be in a poor condition when it was inspected in 2017, and plans were drawn up to replace the 4.3-mile (6.9 km) link during 2021. At that time, it was owned and operated by Scottish Hydro-Electric Power Distribution.

== Hydro-electric schemes ==
There is a limited amount of electricity generation on Arran. As of 2018, there were no wind farms on the island. However, there are four hydro-electric schemes, one long-standing, and the others developed in the 2010s.

=== Claddoch Hydro-Electric Scheme ===
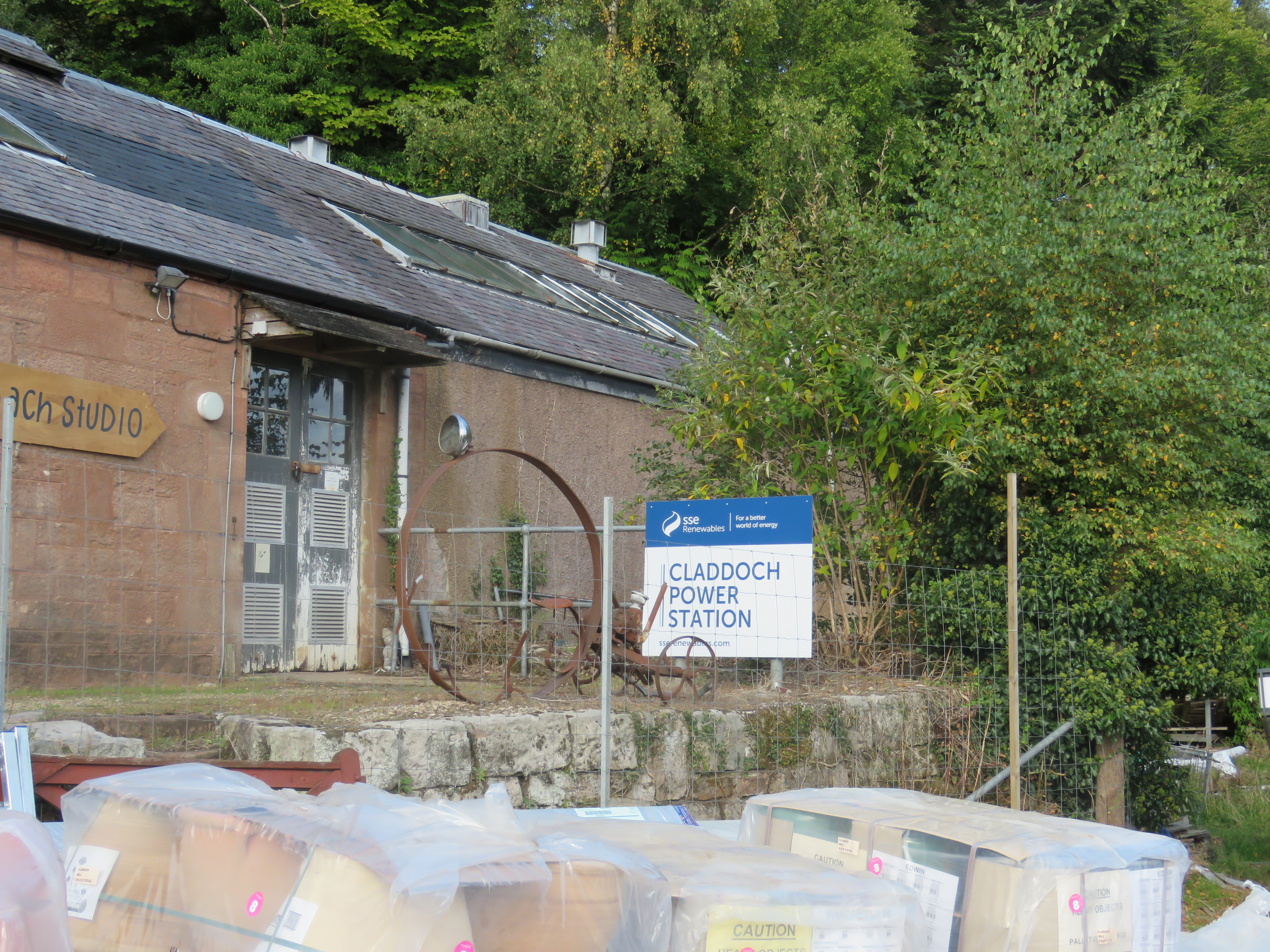
The turbine house for the Claddoch power station

The Claddoch scheme was a private scheme installed by the owners of Brodick Castle in 1909. The present scheme, which is also known as Claddach or Cladach dam, uses water from the Cnochan Burn, on which there is a small dam close to the 720-foot (220 m) contour. An underground pipeline runs to the turbine house, which is located on the A841 road behind the sawmill on the north side of Brodick Bay. The dam was created in the 1940s, but ceased to be used in the 1950s. Following the death of the Dowager Duchess of Montrose and the need to pay huge death duties, the castle ceased to be a private residence and was acquired by the National Trust for Scotland from the Duchess's daughter Lady Jean Fforde in 1958. Subsequently, the hydro scheme was renovated by the North of Scotland Hydro-Electric Board, and is now operated by Scottish and Southern Energy (SSE), their successors. Data from the Office of Gas and Electricity Markets (Ofgem), the energy regulator, gives a commissioning date of 1949 for the scheme.

In 2006, a new pipeline was run from the intake to the turbine house. Topsoil was removed from a strip of land some 23 feet (7 m) wide, and the new pipe was buried close to the old pipe. A small quantity of chipped stone was found in Greenhyde Field during the work, but archaeological investigation found that it had been used as fill for a 19th century field drain, and so was not in its original context. For management purposes, SSE treat the station as part of their Sloy/Awe scheme.

=== Glenkiln Hydro-Electric Scheme ===
The Glenkiln scheme is located near Lamlash in the south-east of Arran. Ideas for the scheme were first discussed in 2012, but planning was complicated by the fact that the works were to take place in an area designated as a Special Protection Area (SPA), where the habitat of migratory birds must be safeguarded, and as a Site of Special Scientific Interest (SSSI). The project was a collaboration between J K and C Bone, a long-established farming business that runs Glenkiln Farm, supplying beef and lamb to local restaurants, and MEG Renewables, who are a renewable energy developer. Planning consent to allow the project to proceed was obtained in September 2014, with construction work beginning in January 2015. Bones employed 12 men to install the pipework over a period of nearly two years, which was hampered by appalling weather conditions and record levels of rainfall, particularly during the winter of 2015/16. Work within the SPA and SSSI had to be completed by March 2016 for the project to qualify for higher levels of feed in tariff. The project was completed by a local contractor, Murchie Sand and Gravel.

It utilises the waters of the Benlister Burn. Water is collected at intakes, and flows along low-pressure pipelines, made from high performance polyethylene (HPPE). These pipelines together are 629 yards (575 m) long, and feed the water into a high-pressure pipeline made from ductile iron, which runs for 1.942 miles (3.125 km) to the turbine house. For most of its route, this pipeline in buried underground, but there is a small section above ground where a pipe bridge carries it across the Tounie Burn. This arrangement provides a gross head of 876 feet (267 m) to a twin jet Pelton wheel, which can produce 500 kW.

In order to access the intake sites, 2.6 miles (4.2 km) of road was built across the moorland. Material for its construction was obtained from whinstone quarries, opened up along the route, which saved the costs of obtaining the stone from further afield. Because of the nature of the terrain, one 1,300-yard (1,200 m) section floats on top of the peat and heather, and three bridges were built to cross streams. Construction work was restricted to the winter months, to prevent disturbing nesting hen harriers in the Special Protection Area. The road will continue to be used for maintenance purposes.

The scheme is expected to produce 1,570 MWh of energy per year, and was commissioned in July 2016. An official opening was held on 28 October and guided tours were offered to pupils from seven primary schools. The scheme generates around 15 percent of the electricity used by Arran's domestic consumers. Shortly after the official opening, the Scottish Parliament passed a motion to congratulate Kenneth Bone for steering the scheme through to completion.

=== Eas Mor Hydro-Electric Scheme ===
The Eas Mor Hydro-Electric Scheme is located on the Allt Mor, a small river near Kildonan in the south of Arran. It is operated by the Eas Mor Ecology Centre, who originally applied for planning permission for a smaller scheme and to build a visitor centre just to the north of the A841 road, which they received. However, before construction started, the centre obtained additional land below the road, and the plans were revised to move the turbine house further downstream on the Allt Mor, which increased the head significantly. The intake for the scheme is located just above the Eas Mor waterfall, and consists of a low weir, with an intake chamber which is screened to prevent debris entering the pipeline. The pipeline is made of a plastic material and is 16 inches (400 mm) in diameter. For most of its 1,040-yard (950 m) length it is buried beneath existing pathways to the east of the river. The exception is where it crosses the Allt Mor, a short distance above the turbine house in Auchenhew Wood, where it is carried by a pipe bridge after which it is buried on the west bank of the river. The turbine house is around 360 feet (110 m) below the level of the intake.

The water feeds a Pelton wheel turbine, with an installed capacity of 95 kW. The tailrace feeds back into the Allt Mor. A buried cable carries the generated power away to a transformer, connecting the scheme to the 33 kV network on Arran. The cost of the project was around £315,000, and it had to be completed by 19 December 2015 in order to qualify for the feed-in tariffs negotiated at the beginning of the project. The station should produce around 274 MWh of energy per year, and the feed-in tariffs should be about £78,000 per year. Once the capital costs have been covered, all profits from the operation of the station will be used to improve the facilities at the ecology centre. The section of the A841 road that passes the ecology centre and crosses over the pipeline has since been downgraded to an unclassified minor road.

=== Dougarie Hydro-Electric Scheme ===
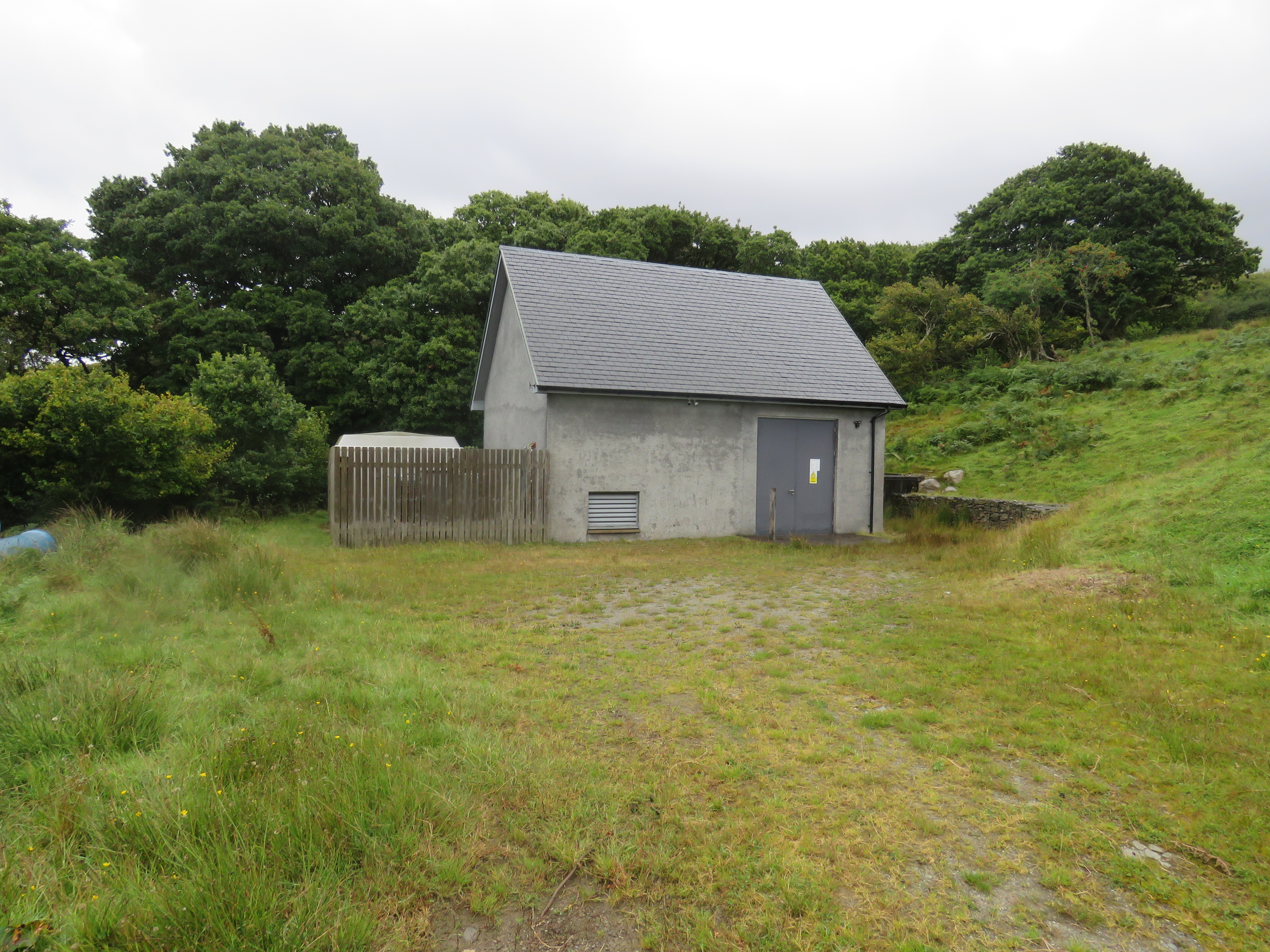
The Dougarie turbine house. The Allt Gobhlach is just behind the building.

Dougarie Hydro-Electric Scheme is located near Pirnmill, on the west coast of Arran. It is a run-of-the-river scheme, utilising the waters of the Allt Gobhlach. A concrete intake structure, including a header tank, was constructed at the upper end of the scheme. The upper end of the pipeline consists of 1,100 yards (1,000 m) of 25-inch (630 mm) diameter High-density polyethylene (HDPE) pipe. At the lower end, 770 yards (700 m) of 20-inch (500 mm) diameter ductile iron pipe completes the connection to the turbine house. This provides a head of 620 feet (190 m) to the Canyon turbine, which is rated at 500 kW. The scheme was designed by Campbell of Doune.

The scheme is built on land owned by the Dougarie Estate, who initially looked at the possibility of wind turbines as a way to generate income, but this was ruled out by the local development plan. However, a hydro-electric scheme was acceptable to the planning authority, as it has a much lower visual impact. In 2008 the estate approached SSE plc, the local energy supplier, for permission to connect one of four possible schemes to the National Grid, and began a project to collect flow data from the rivers. By the end of 2009, they had an offer for a grid connection, which was restricted to a maximum of 500 kW. The Allt Gobhlach had an average flow rate of around 26 Megalitres per day (Mld) over the course of a year, and this was chosen as the most suitable. Planning permission was secured in early 2012, and the scheme was commissioned in June 2013. It will benefit from feed-in tariffs for the electricity sold to the grid. During the early stages, the local community were kept well informed of the proposals, with a document outlining the scheme placed in the post office, while local residents all received their own copy, and the plans were well-received by those living nearby.

== Bibliography ==
- Boag, Hugh (29 October 2016). "Generating for generations as hydro dream comes on stream". The Arran Banner. ISBN 978-1-84158-449-2. Archived from the original on 30 October 2023.
- Coventry, Martin (2006). The Castles of Scotland. Birlinn. ISBN 978-1-84158-449-2.
- Davidson, Gordon (15 December 2014). "Much to gain from the rain". The Scottish Farmer. Archived from the original on 27 October 2023.
