= Sliddery =

Coordinates: 55.457°N 5.273°W

Sliddery: Scottish Gaelic: Slaodraidh
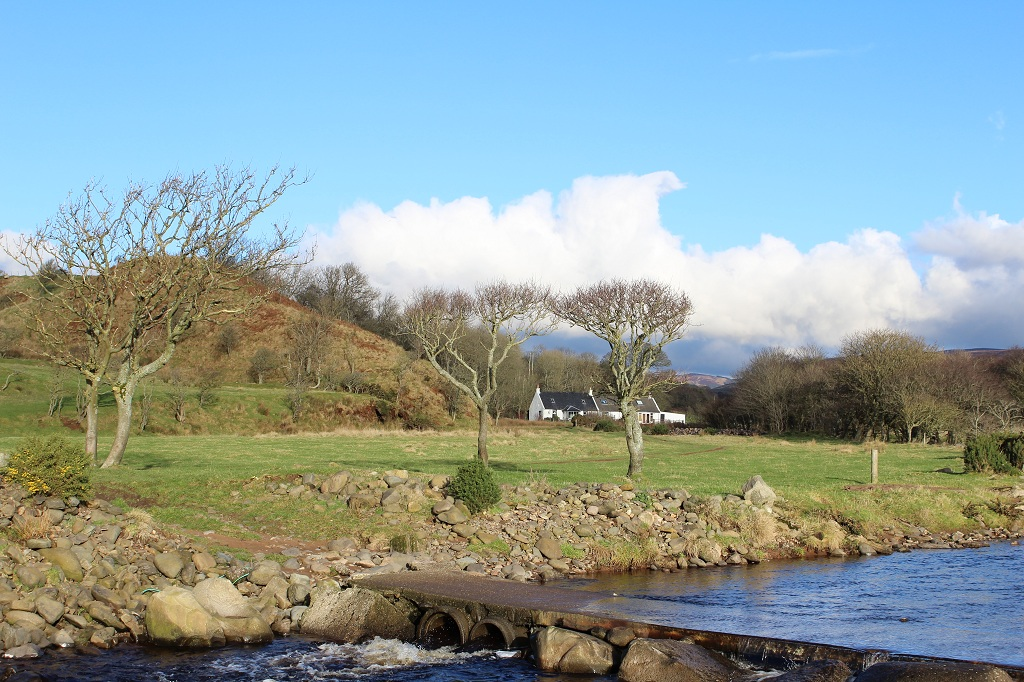
- Sliddery Water ford and Burnside Cottage

- Location within North Ayrshire
- OS grid reference: NR930229
- Civil parish: Kilmory
- Council area: North Ayrshire
- Lieutenancy area: Ayrshire and Arran
- Country: Scotland
- Sovereign state: United Kingdom
- Post town: ISLE OF ARRAN
- Postcode district: KA27
- Dialling code: 01770
- Police: Scotland
- Fire: Scottish
- Ambulance: Scottish
- UK Parliament: North Ayrshire and Arran
- Scottish Parliament: Cunninghame North

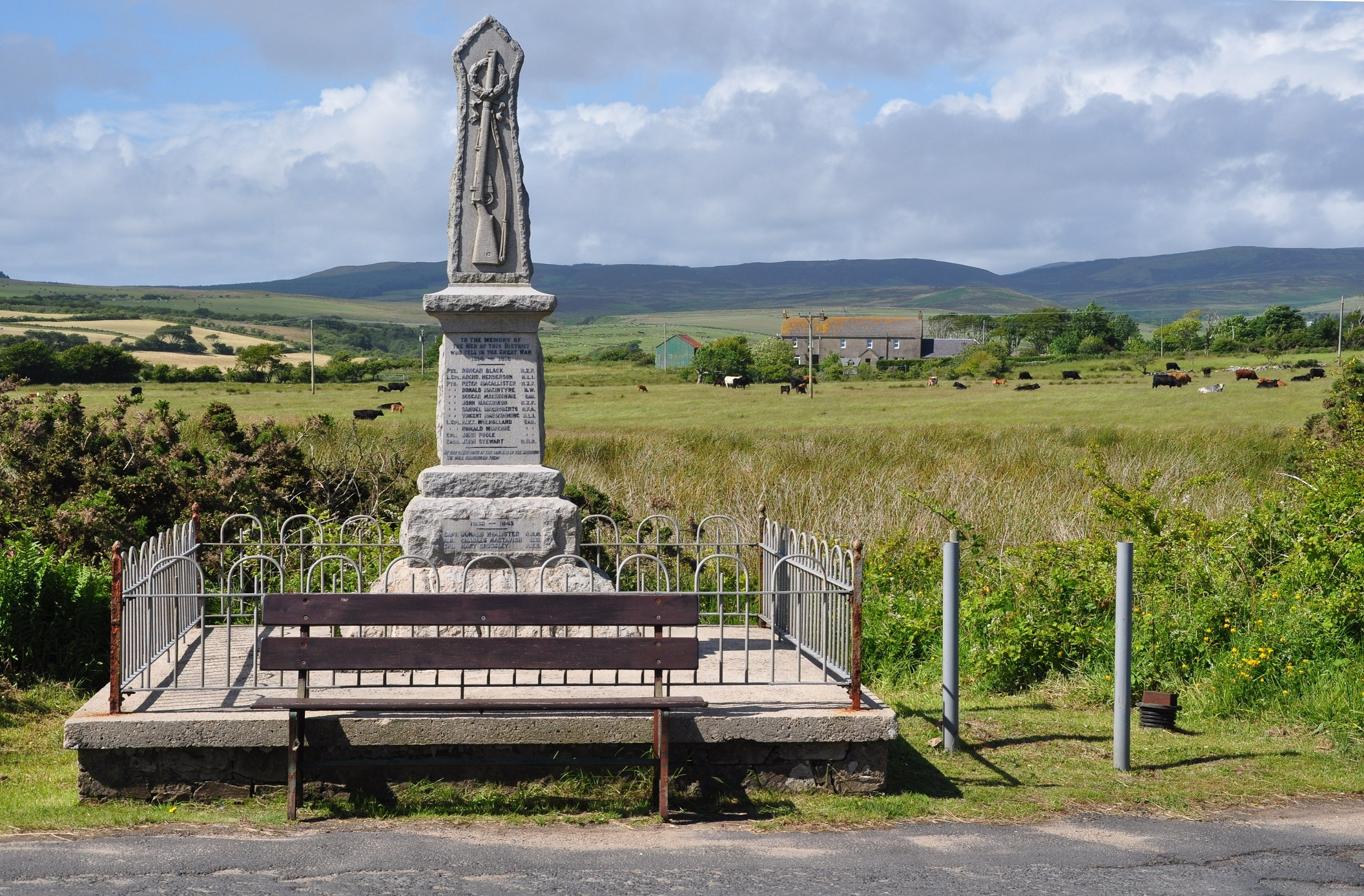
World War I (and II) memorial between Sliddery and Lagg at the Ross Road intersection.

Sliddery (Gaelic: Slaodraidh) is a tiny hamlet located on the Southwest coast of the Isle of Arran in Scotland. The village is situated near the Ross road between Lagg and Blackwaterfoot.

The name Sliddery is thought to have been derived from the Gaelic denoting dragging or trailing, but another story has it that it was here that a band of marauding Vikings were butchered when attempting to settle in Sliddery Water valley and that the name has something to do with slaughter or massacre.

Nowadays, the hamlet sits upon the hill high above the estuary, about 1/2 mile (800 metres) from the shore. Various lanes lead down to a pebble beach, which offers views across the Kilbrannan Sound to Ireland and Ailsa Craig.
