= Pirnmill =

Coordinates: 55.645°N 5.383°W

Pirnmill: Scottish Gaelic: Muileann nam Piùirneachan
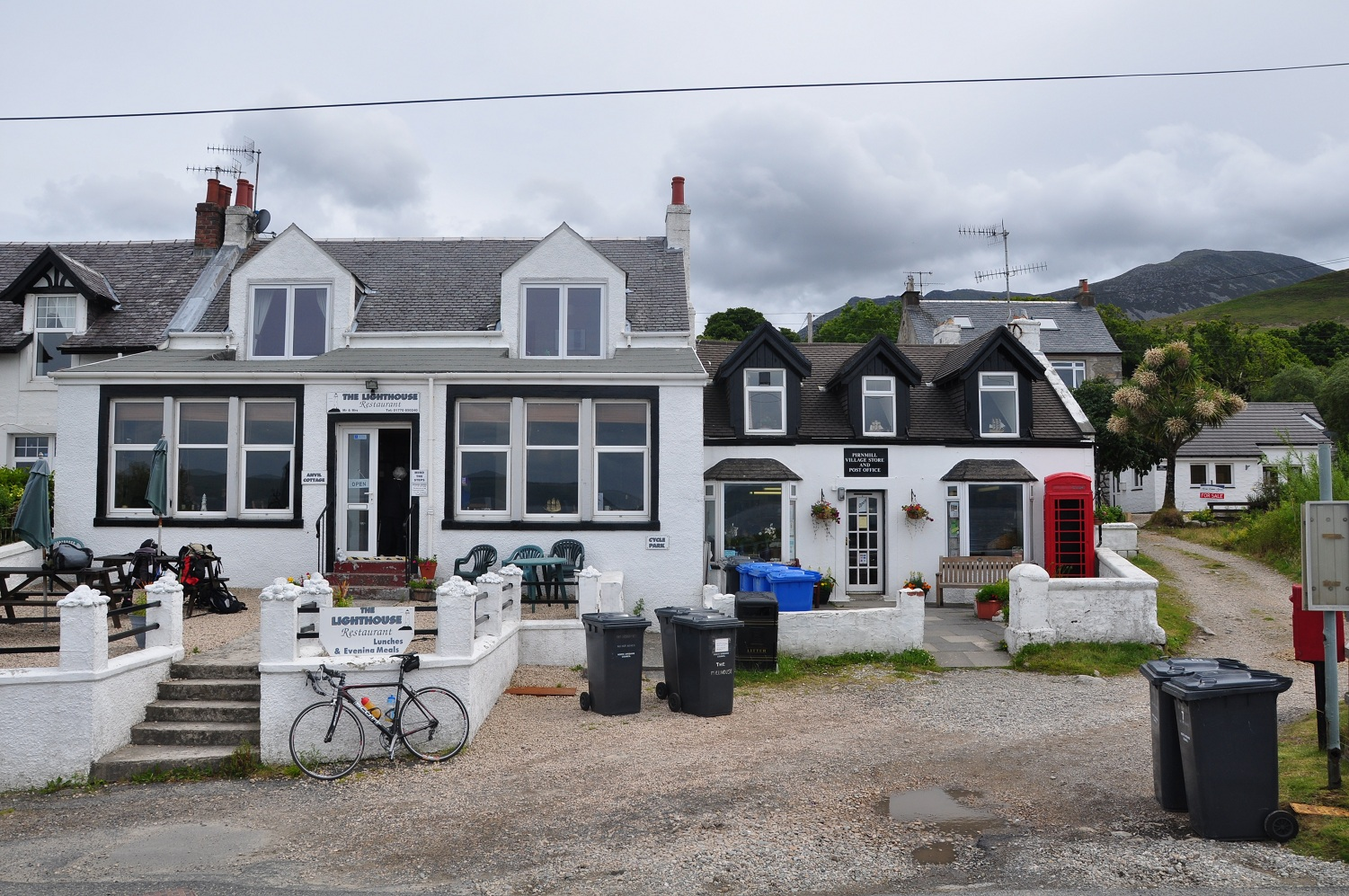
- Village store/post office and restaurant in the centre of Pirnmill

- Location within North Ayrshire
- Population: 110
- OS grid reference: NR871442
- Civil parish: Kilmory
- Council area: North Ayrshire
- Lieutenancy area: Ayrshire and Arran
- Country: Scotland
- Sovereign state: United Kingdom
- Post town: ISLE OF ARRAN
- Postcode district: KA27
- Dialling code: 01770
- Police: Scotland
- Fire: Scottish
- Ambulance: Scottish
- UK Parliament: North Ayrshire and Arran
- Scottish Parliament: Cunninghame North

Pirnmill (Scottish Gaelic: Muileann nam Piùirneachan) is a small village on the north-west coast of the island of Arran, Scotland. The village is situated on the Kilbrannan Sound, facing Grogport on the Kintyre peninsula.

Located within the parish of Kilmory, Pirnmill is the 'modern name' for the village which was built along the shore in the 19th and early 20th century. The original 'village' was Penrioch, a more ancient settlement with Norse origins (the name means speckled pennylands in Old Norse) just up the hill.

== Etymology ==
Unlike many of the other villages on the island, Pirnmill's etymology is not rooted in the Gaelic or Norse heritage of Arran. Its history is recent. Pirnmill gets its name from a mill built around 1830, by Clarks of Paisley. The mill made wooden bobbins - or pirns - that were used in the cotton industry. The 'pirn mill' was powered by an overshot water wheel, the runnel of which could still be seen in 1970s (Reference: History of the Villages of Arran, 1975 Arran WRI). Birch and oak wood was sourced locally and the water was re-directed from the Allt Gobhlach burn. The mill only operated for around ten years, as the wood quickly ran out.

== History ==
The village began to expand in the late 19th century and early 20th. Pirnmill soon became a tourist destination, with many Clyde steamers stopping here on their way to Campbeltown. The village was served by small ferry boats that would be rowed out to the steamers. Visitors would have to decant into the small wooden boat to be rowed ashore by a local. The last of these local ferry men was Archibald Currie (who lived at Sunnyside). The steamers stopped, during the Second World War, and never really reinstated. The jetty below the shop was built in the 1930s to make it easier for visitors (and cargo) to disembark from the small ferries.

Pirnmill formerly had two church buildings. The Church of Scotland met in a building to the south of the village, until it closed in the 1990s. A memorial to Rev John Kennedy of Lenimore remains. It is made of white granite in Gothic style, and carries the date 1910. It is a category B listed structure. A little further to the north is a building dating from the 1920s, erected by members of the Free Church of Scotland, who previously had worshipped at Lenimore. It was initially a church hall, but was used for worship after the Lenimore building was demolished. The Church of Scotland leased the building from the 1990s, when their original building closed, to 29 January 2023 when the church closed. It is a rectangular structure made of corrugated iron, with a concrete base and asbestos roof tiles. Internally it is lined with yellow pine boards. It was a temporary building, of a type that could be readily ordered from a catalogue in the late 19th or early 20th centuries. Few such buildings remain, because of their temporary nature, and this one has been little altered from its original condition. The building is grade C listed.

On the southern edge of the village is the turbine house for the Dougarie Hydro-Electric Scheme. The Dougarie Estate secured planning permission for a scheme utilising the waters of the Allt Gobhlach in 2012. The power station, which generates 500 kW and feeds it into the National Grid, was commissioned in June 2013.

Economy

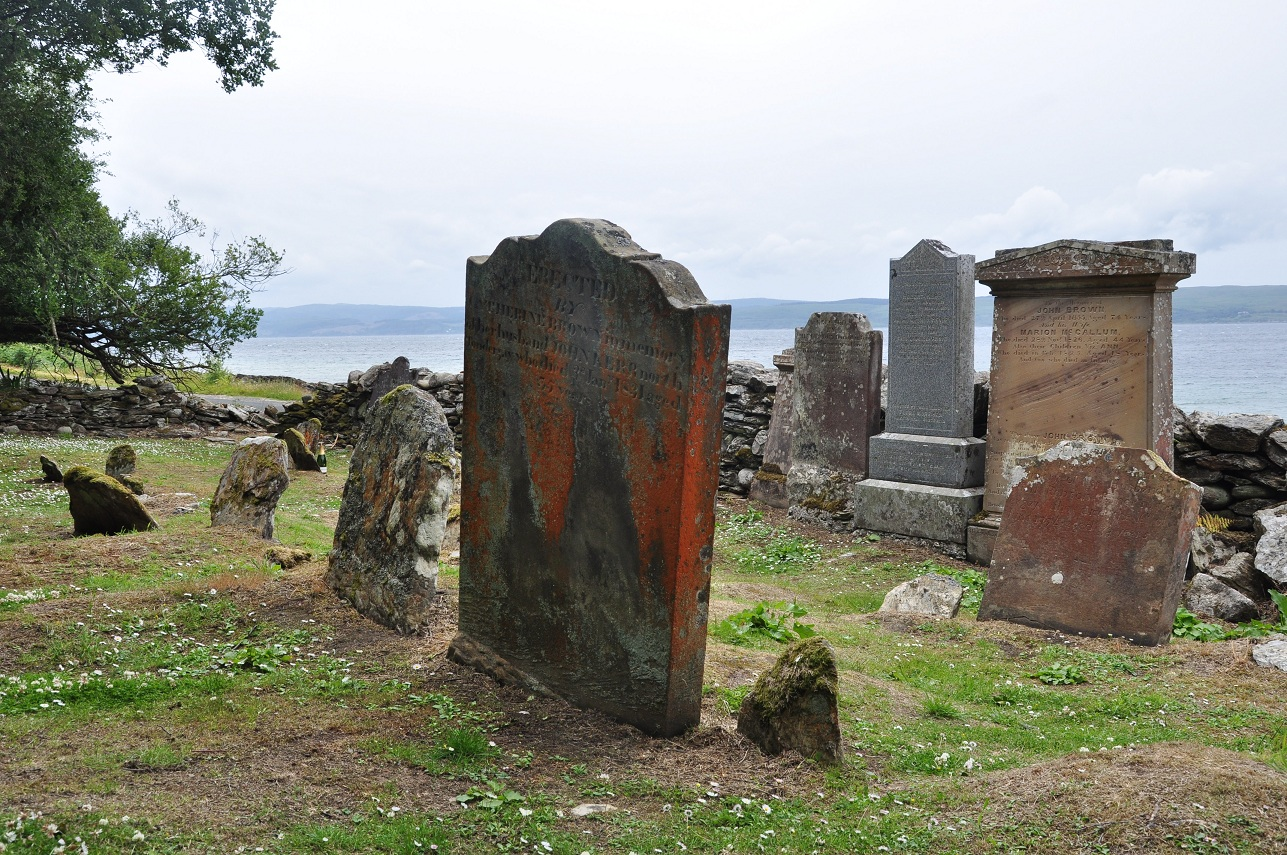
Ancient burial ground on the coast, just north of Pirnmill. Kintyre is in the background.

Pirnmill has a village shop, restaurant and a B&B, as well as a monthly 'Pop Up Pub'. Two miles (three kilometres) north of the village, halfway between Pirnmill and Catacol, there is an ancient burial ground close to the shore at Rhubha Airigh Bheirg.

== Notable people ==
- Flora Drummond - suffragette. Flora was born in Manchester in 1878, but the family moved to Arran within a year of her birth, and lived at Pirnmill. She was educated on Arran, but moved away to Glasgow when she was 14.

== Bibliography ==
- Davidson, Gordon (15 December 2014). "Much to gain from the rain". The Scottish Farmer. Archived from the original on 27 October 2023.
