= Whitefarland =

Coordinates: 55.626°N 5.393°W

Whitefarland: Scottish Gaelic: An Aoirinn
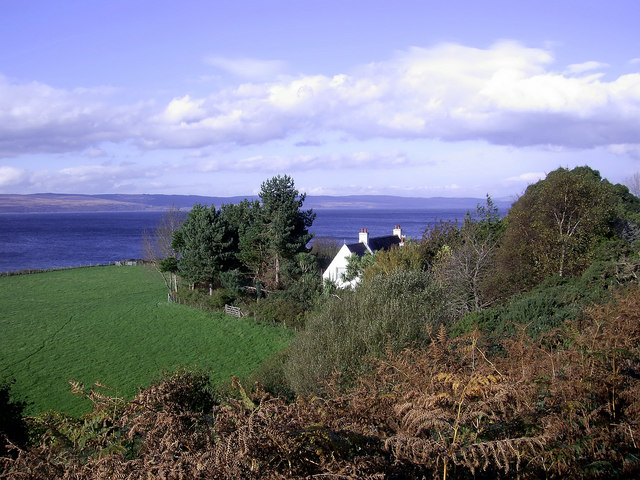
- The view from Whitefarland point to Kintyre

- Location within North Ayrshire
- OS grid reference: NR864421
- Civil parish: Kilmory
- Council area: North Ayrshire
- Lieutenancy area: Ayrshire and Arran
- Country: Scotland
- Sovereign state: United Kingdom
- Post town: ISLE OF ARRAN
- Postcode district: KA27
- Dialling code: 01770
- Police: Scotland
- Fire: Scottish
- Ambulance: Scottish
- UK Parliament: North Ayrshire and Arran
- Scottish Parliament: Cunninghame North

Whitefarland is a clachan on the north west coast of the Isle of Arran looking west over the Kilbrannan Sound and Kintyre. There is evidence of human settlement here dating back to the Bronze Age and earlier. Heritage Scotland have recorded a Neolithic fish trap on Whitefarland Point and various burial sites.

The name Whitefarland is derived from Old Norse, not Gaelic. For 400 years (roughly 800–1263 AD) Arran was a significant part of the Viking Kingdom of Norway, specifically the Suðr-eyjar (Kingdom of Mann and the Isles). The name may refer to Olaf the White, who was King of Ireland and the Western Isles. Whitefarland is recorded in 14th century records (in the Scottish National Archive) and in the Book of Arran (Mackenzie 1914), as Quhtforlane, which in Old Norse, translates as "White's land of ships'. Although Mackenzie translates forlane as "land between the hills and the sea.' Records from 1351 also list its alternative name as 'Irachonan' - or Iraconung - which means 'King of Ireland' in Old Norse.

'The Gaelic of Arran' by Nils Magnus Holmer (published by the Dublin Institute of Advanced Studies, 1957) lists a later Gaelic name, as An aoireann. Holmer states that this translates as 'ferry' in Arran Gaelic. The 17th century cartographer, Timothy Pont, published an antique map of Arran (published in J. Blaeu Grooten Atlas, 1664 - Van der Krogt 2, 621) and Whitefarland is shown on the map as Row na heren. Holmer's phonetic translation of Whitefarland point is the same, concluding that it is a phonetic or literal translation of Rhu na Aoireann - point of the ferry/ferry point. It is the nearest westerly point to the Kintyre Peninsula.

Whitefarland was not owned by the Dukes of Hamilton (who owned the majority of the island for 500 years). It was given to the MacLoy/Fullarton family in the 14th century, by King Robert II, for helping Robert the Bruce gain the crown of Scotland. The Fullartons owned the Kilmichael Estate in Brodick and also 150 acres of Whitefarland for 600 years, according to family documents held by the Scottish Archive.

In the 18th and 19th Centuries, the clachan consisted of a croft farmhouse and associated outbuildings and cottar cottages. Ordnance Survey records from 1844 to 1867 name the farm and the farmhouse as Whitefarland. Records show that the farmer at Whitefarland was John McMillan (b 1775 d 1861) and then his son, Angus McMillan, (b1803 d1891) who probably built the new farmhouse or 'white house' which still stands. His son, also Angus McMillan, subsidised farming with herring fishing. They would all have spoken Gaelic. The McMillans are buried in the small burial ground on the back of Imacher shore just south of Whitefarland Point.

Henry Robertson Fullarton, of Kilmichael, sold the lands at Whitefarland, in 1919, to the Hamilton Estate and sometime around 1920/1930, a new road was built, knocking down at least 2 of the old cottar cottages. A new house, Elkhorn, was also built in 1923. The Arran Heritage Museum, Brodick, has old photos showing what the clachan looked like prior to the road being built. It was known for its palm trees (Cordyline australis) - the oldest one still stands and is at least 70+ years old.

Whitefarland has views north and west over the Kilbrannan Sound.
