= Holloway Brothers (London) =

English construction company

Holloway Brothers (London) Ltd
- Type: Private limited company
- Industry: Construction
- Founded: 1882
- Founder: Henry Thomas Holloway (1853-1914), Sir Henry Holloway (1857-1923)
- Defunct: 1968
- Fate: Acquired
- Successor: John Laing plc
- Headquarters: London, England
- Area served: United Kingdom, Middle East
- Key people: Sir Henry Holloway (Chairman 1902-1923), Samuel Holloway (Chairman 1923-1933), Sir Henry Holloway (Chairman 1933-1951), Peter Holloway (Chairman 1951-)

Holloway Brothers (London) Ltd was a leading English construction company specialising in building and heavy civil engineering work based in London.

== History ==
=== Early history ===
The company was founded as a partnership in 1882 by two brothers, Henry Thomas Holloway and Henry Holloway, at Queen's Road in Battersea; this was a consequence of their elder brother James refusing to take them into partnership. In 1889, on the death of James, they took on the business and obligations of the building and construction firm founded by him in 1875 and then based in Marmion Road Lavender Hill. This reunited their father Thomas, and surviving brothers, John and Samuel, in a single family firm. James had already obtained significant contracts for buildings including Battersea Library and Public Baths and the completion of these gave the firm an important boost leading to the winning of major public contracts including Chatham Naval Barracks (1897–1902).

=== Key dates from 1900 ===
1899 move to Victoria Wharf, Belvedere Road Westminster.

1901 creation of the 'Steel Office' under the structural engineer T Aubrey Watson.

1902 becomes private limited company. Opens a branch at 43 South Audley St Mayfair (still trading as Holloway White Allom) to undertake high quality decoration and maintenance work.

1905 licenses the Hennebique system of reinforced concrete construction from L G Mouchel. This led to a rapid expansion of the company's civil engineering work and the winning of contracts for major projects such as the General Post Office building (1907).

1912 company reorganisation. Holloway Brothers (London) Limited created to undertake the construction activities of the firm with the original company renamed as Holloways Properties Limited.

1915 move to Bridge Wharf (later 157) Millbank on compulsory purchase of Victoria Wharf by the London County Council as the site for the new County Hall. Joinery works move to Magdalen Rd Earlsfield, stonemasonry to Thessaly Rd Nine Elms.

1917 Newcastle upon Tyne branch opened (closed 1932, reopened 1954).

1934 recruits technical staff from the defunct London office of the bridge department of Dorman, Long of Middlesbrough. This enabled the company to take on steel bridge construction to complement their expertise in reinforced concrete bridges.

1942 expands into open cast mining. Nottingham office opened.

1946 acquires interest in Dene quarry at Cromford Derbyshire which then traded as Dene Quarries (Derbyshire) Ltd, a wholly owned subsidiary.

1957 forms association with John Laing & Son whilst remaining an independent company.

1960 acquires White Allom Limited, a business led by Sir Charles White Allom, antiques advisor and interior decorator to King George V and Queen Mary.

1964 acquired by John Laing & Son.

1968 Holloway White Allom begins to trade as separate subsidiary.

2002 Management buyout of Holloway White Allom.

2011 Holloway White Allom placed in administration and is closed.

== Family involvement ==
Holloways remained a family firm through several generations. The original brothers were sons of Thomas and Elizabeth Holloway, of West Lavington, Wiltshire where Thomas was a local jobbing builder and bricklayer. They had five sons, James (1851–89), Henry Thomas (1853–1914), John (1854–1932), Henry (1857–1923), and Samuel (1862–1938). Thomas moved to London to work with his eldest son James in 1868, and the rest of the family followed in 1870. James and Thomas became bricklayers and then general foremen, James at only about 18 and Thomas at 21, John was apprenticed as a carpenter, whilst in due course Henry joined a firm of timber merchants and Samuel began work in a solicitor's office. James set up his own business with a few hundred pounds in capital in 1875 and by the following year had new premises at Marmion Rd Lavender Hill and his father and other brothers joined the firm. Henry became office manager, Thomas outside manager, John worked as a carpenter and Samuel apprenticed as a joiner. Initially the firm concentrated on speculative house building in Clapham but rapidly expanded to take on larger contracts such as churches, schools, public libraries and baths.

The split seems to have come because James refused to take his brothers Thomas and Henry into partnership, leading to their setting up an independent firm in 1882, but the family links ensured a fairly seamless amalgamation of the businesses on the death of James in 1889. Samuel Holloway joined Thomas and Henry as director of the company on its incorporation in 1902, and only one director, Courthauld Thompson, was drawn from outside the company. That situation did not change on the company reorganisation in 1912, because although Thomas Holloway was joined as director by his sons Henry T and Ernest C, and Henry by sons Roland and Herbert (Dick), the only other director was Charles Byworth, the original company secretary. It was after the death of the founding Thomas in 1914 that WH Stacey and GF Palmer, recruited from John Aird & Co in 1912 and 1915, slightly diluted the family's control when they joined the board in 1917. On Sir Henry's death in 1923 chairmanship passed to Samuel, the sole surviving member of the founding generation who remained with the firm. Six members of the following generation then worked for the firm - Henry T, Ernest, Roland, Herbert, and Harold and Rupert, sons of Samuel. Henry T replaced Samuel as chairman on his retirement in 1933. Stacey and Palmer both died in 1933 and were succeeded as non-family directors in 1934 by William Storey Wilson, who had joined from Dorman Long in 1934. Rupert and Harold became directors in 1936. Henry Thomas Holloway was President of the Federation of Civil Engineering Contractors 1940-46 and knighted for his wartime services in 1945. He remained chairman until his death in 1951.

Family control was retained in the 1950s. Four grandsons of the original founders were on the board by the beginning of the decade and one, Peter, succeeded Sir Henry as chairman and managing director. Nor was family control merely nominal; even at this period they retained the tradition that family members should start at the bottom and learn the trade before moving up to senior management.

== Notable Projects ==
=== Buildings ===
The company built many notable buildings of which a good number survive today. These included ones designed by architects EW Mountford, Sir Reginald Blomfeld, Sir Herbert Baker, Sir Edwin Lutyens, Sir Giles Gilbert Scott, Sir Edward Maufe and Sir Basil Spence. The list below is far from comprehensive.

1889-90 Battersea public library and baths

1891-4 Battersea Polytechnic

1893-4 Streatham Pumping House. In the style of the day, built with domed and turreted neo-Byzantine pumping house and tall brick chimney stack in the form of a campanile.

1897-1902 Chatham Royal Naval Barracks

1897- Admiralty Building, Horse Guards Parade

1899-1900 Millais Building (flats) Millbank

1900-7 Central Criminal Court (Old Bailey)

1901-3 London Wall office development

1904-05 Hanover House flats Regent's Park

1904-9 Gorringes department store, Buckingham Palace Rd Westminster

1905 Rushton Hall, Northamptonshire, completely restored after fire.

1905-6 United University Club, Pall Mall Westminster

1907-10 General Post Office (King Edward's Building), Giltspur St London. The first large reinforced concrete building in London.

1908- Caxton House, Tothill St Westminster

1910-1911 Whiteleys department store, Queensway Bayswater An example of a steel framed building which could be built much more cheaply and quickly than the traditional masonry construction used at Gorringes, demonstrating the revolution in building techniques at this period.

1912-17 Government Buildings, Storey's Gate Westminster

1914-15 Waldershare Park Tilmanstone Kent, completely restored after fire.

1922-31 Westminster Bank, 51-52 Threadneedle St London

1924-5 County Fire Office, Piccadilly Circus

1924-7 Courtauld Building, 16 St Martin's-le-Grand

1924-42 Bank of England Threadneedle St London. Only the earlier screen wall (c1800) by John Soane survives on the south and west sides and that had to be underpinned. The project took so long because of its scale (much of it is underground) and the bank continued in operation on site during the work. Holloways was seen as well suited to contracts of this nature both because of its expertise in civil engineering and because as an integrated company it had its own stonemasonry, joinery and decorating divisions with a demonstrated ability to carry out work to the highest craft standards.

1928-33 Glyn Mills and Martin's Bank buildings in Lombard Street

1929-32 Princess Beatrice Hospital Earls Court

1933 Empire Swimming Pool, Wembley now incorporated in Wembley Arena

1933 Members' Stand at Lord's

1933- Cumberland Hotel Marble Arch

1934 Peckham Health Centre. An innovative architectural and public health project.

1935-7 Kingston House Kensington Rd London SW7

1936-9 Westminster Hospital Marsham Street.

193(1)-39 Duveen gallery British Museum and North Library reconstruction (date of latter unclear)

1938-40 Roche Products Factory, Broadwater Rd Welwyn Garden City

1950- Serjeant's Inn rebuilding, Fleet Street

Post-war Holloways were responsible for large scale flat and domestic housing developments e.g. at Crawley New Town and Draycott Avenue Chelsea, Henry Dicken's Court Kensington and the Pimlico housing scheme (1st four blocks).

=== Civil engineering ===
With the acquisition of expertise in steel framing and reinforced concrete at the beginning of the 20th century civil engineering became an important aspect of the company's operations.

1906 covered reservoir at Hart Lane Luton, the company's first reinforced concrete project.

1907-12 new jetty at Western Dock, widening and deepening of Tobacco Dock, at London Docks

1907-13 sea defence works at Roedean, Rottingdean and Ramsgate

1914 power station for the Euston-Watford rail electrification scheme, leading to involvement in many rail infrastructure projects subsequently.

1920 500 ft graving dock and deep water quay at Seaton Snook, River Tees, and similar works in the 1920s and 1930s on the Thames, at Grimsby, Seahouses Hebburn and Jarrow

1935 Morgan Crucible chimney, Battersea. The chimney was 279 feet high and is of interest because it was necessary for the consulting engineers to develop a new form of shuttering to make moving form construction possible. The chimney tapered from a diameter of 13 feet, 11 inches at the base to 9 feet 3 inches at the top, and the wall thickness reduced from 15 inches to 6 inches. The upper 266 feet took 44 days to build.

1937 Littlebrook A power station, Dartford.

1940 oil discharging jetty at Avonmouth

1945- Catalagzi power Station, Turkey. The contract had been let in 1940 but construction was delayed by the Second World War

1946-52 Baghdad Railway Station

1947 new deep water quay and Millennium flour mill at Royal Victoria Dock, London. Similar project at Caledonia Mills Leith.

1948 new quay wall and jetty at Nine Elms

1950 oil loading jetties at Al-Faw, Shatt al-Arab, Iraq, followed by two more similar projects there.

1950-4 Smith's Dry dock and deepwater quay at North Shields

1953-5 quays at Tilbury Docks followed by Beckton Quay and Erith Jetty, all on the Thames.

Post-war, power station construction was carried out at Littlebrook (extensions), Brighton, Freemans Meadow Leicester, Uskmouth pump house (a major undertaking because of its location with an extreme tidal range, weighing 42,000 tons when complete), Tilbury and Dalmarnock.

The company is also reported to have carried out work in Australia

=== Bridges ===
1914 Esk Bridge Gretna, replacing one built by Thomas Telford in 1820.

1922-6 Bridge over the Thames at Reading. At the time, the longest single span reinforced concrete bridge in the UK.

1924-8 Royal Tweed Bridge at Berwick-upon-Tweed

1930-3 Hampton Court Bridge

1934-7 Chelsea Bridge The first self-anchored suspension bridge in the country and the first steel bridge built by Holloways.

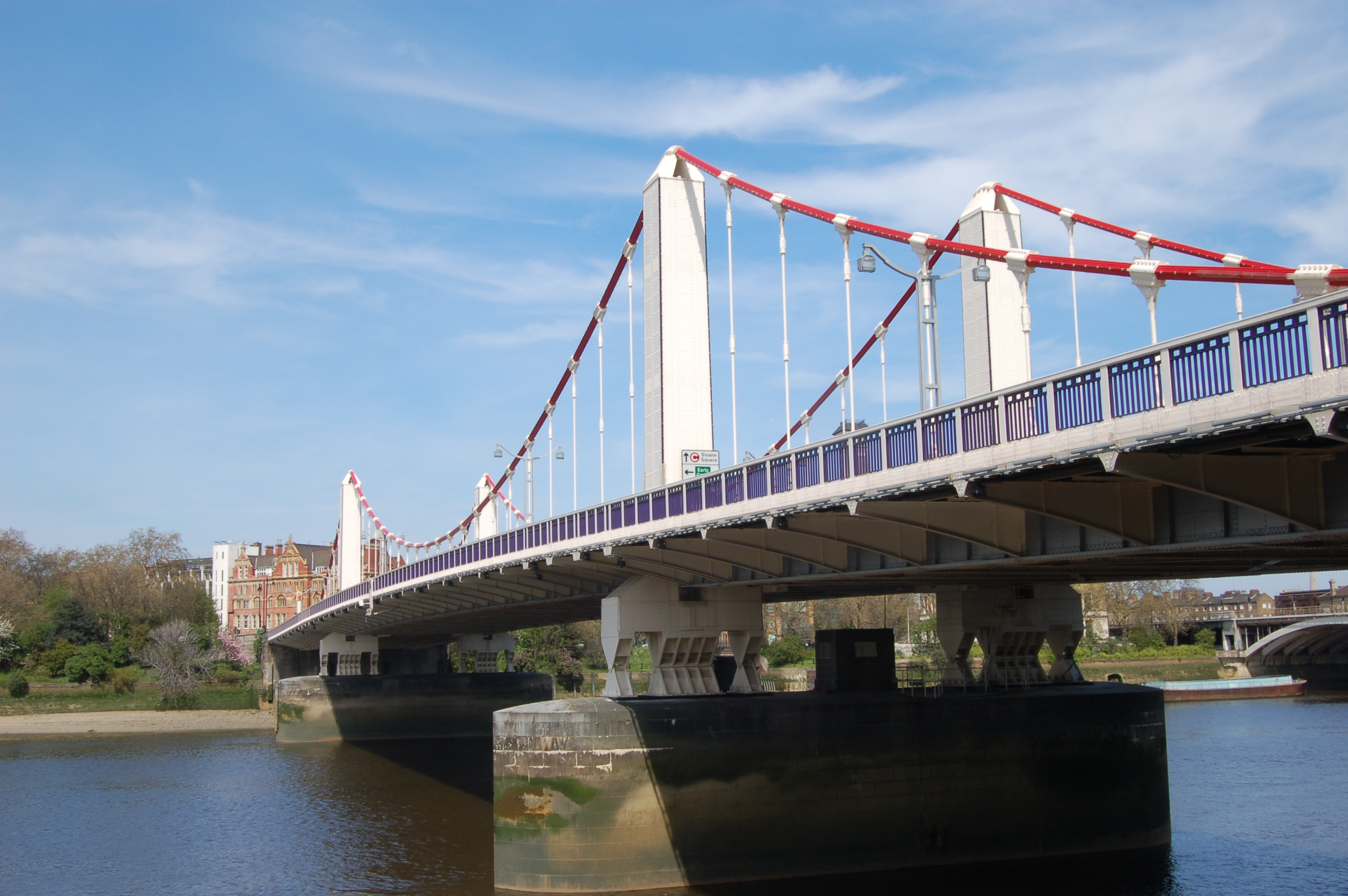
Chelsea Bridge built by Holloway Brothers (London)

1936-7 Towy Bridge at Carmarthen

1936- King Ghazi and King Faisal Bridges across the Tigris at Baghdad

1936-40 Wandsworth Bridge

1939- Bahrain swing bridge

1945-50 Baghdad combined road-rail bridge across the Tigris

1956-8 bridge over the Diyala River at Baqubah Iraq

=== Restoration of historic buildings, memorials and similar projects ===
Although heavily engaged in large scale construction and civil engineering work the firm was proud of its retention of craft skills.

Work on churches included restoration and expansion of Hexham Abbey including a new nave and restoration of the choir screen and stalls, the building of a new chapel at Ampleforth Abbey (1922–5) and in 1926-30 the 9th Church of Christ, Scientist, Marsham Street Westminster.

There was a considerable demand for memorials and similar enterprises after both the First and Second World Wars. Of note are the Memorial Cloisters at Winchester College (1924), Harrow School memorial, Marlborough College Memorial Hall (1925), the Arch of Remembrance in Victoria Park, Leicester (1925), King George V Memorial Fountain Windsor (1937), the Trafalgar Square reconstruction (completed 1948), the Air Forces Memorial Runnymede (1953), and the Magna Carta Memorial, Runnymede (1957).

The firm worked on many historic buildings including the restoration of war damage. They included the Merchant Taylors' Hall, London, College Building, Westminster School, White Lodge, Richmond Park, Cumberland Terrace, Regent's Park and the Inner Temple London.

=== World Wars ===
Although there were contracts to be completed, normal operations were severely affected by the recruitment of men to the armed forces and the government direction of labour, and new work was mainly or wholly devoted to the needs of war.

==== First World War ====
The firm completed numerous war contracts including camps, factories and ordnance sheds at Purfleet, Didcot and Langwith Derbyshire and a hospital at Étaples in France. The company also built numerous houses for war workers at Rosyth, Roe Green Village, Kingsbury and Cardington, Bedfordshire. The most famous incident concerns the chairman, Henry Holloway, himself. He was approached by David Lloyd George, when Minister of Munitions, for help in providing housing for the workers at the new war factories throughout the country. Henry Holloway, and his foreman Mr Gathercole, toured the country arranging the work with local builders and architects, achieving the target of providing the necessary housing within six months. Henry Holloway was knighted for his services in 1917.

==== Second World War ====
The war brought numerous contracts for the building of new camps, ordnance depots, Royal Air Force stations, hospitals and the like. The largest single contract was for the building of an ordnance factory at ROF Kirkby on which 15,000 men were employed at the peak of construction and the factory was able to commence operation in ten and a half months though the complete project took almost two years. Later in the war the firm responded to the urgent need to expand domestic coal production by engaging in open cast mining for which they were well fitted by their experience with heavy earth moving equipment. The first such mine was in the Dukeries area of Nottinghamshire in 1942, and the firm rapidly expanded its operations there and in the Newcastle area, for example at Whitley Bay.

Holloways were contracted to build a series of sea forts for the defence of the Thames estuary, and these were built in reinforced concrete and steel in dock basins and berths at Gravesend. They were of two distinct types, four naval forts in reinforced concrete and three army forts each consisting of seven interlinked sections. When complete, they were towed out and sunk in position. This work then led to two more novel wartime activities. One was the building of small reinforced concrete floating docks for the repair of small vessels, in particular landing craft. They were designed by Guy Maunsell, who had also designed the sea forts, and the first three 400 ton units were ordered in August 1943. They consisted of slabs cast flat and placed upright when hardened, then the horizontal base was cast and the joins sealed with concrete. Fourteen were eventually constructed at Gravesend and elsewhere, and a number more were on order to be built in various locations including India when the war finished. They could be built in as little as nine weeks and two, AFD 37 and 50, were deployed at Arromanches after D-Day.

Also stemming from experience with the sea forts was the company's involvement in the development of the Mulberry harbour units. In October 1942 Holloways were commissioned to build three units on the Hippo design of Hugh Iorys Hughes on shore at Conwy Morfa, no suitable dry dock being available. This was a considerable challenge because the largest unit, the pierhead, consisted of a reinforced concrete pontoon 203 feet long, with a beam of 45 feet and depth of 24 feet, on which was mounted a steel superstructure 62 feet high and itself weighing 350 tons. The total weight of the unit was 3,200 tons and had to be side launched. The solution was to build the unit on keel blocks and when complete transfer the weight to the launching cradle which ran over a curved ramp which increased in gradient from one in 16 to one in six. Although the Hippo design itself was not adopted the build and launching technique was widely used for other Mulberry units.

== Sources ==
- Hartcup, Guy (2011). Code Name Mulberry: The Planning Building and Operation of the Normandy Harbours. Pen & Sword Military. ISBN 978-1848845589.
- Ritchie, Berry (1997). The Good Builder: The John Laing Story. James & James.
- Rolt, LTC.(1958), Holloways of Millbank The First Seventy-Five Years. Newman Neame Ltd for Holloway Brothers (London) Ltd
