= SS Iserlohn =

A number of steamships were named Iserlohn, including:

- SS Iserlohn (1909), in service with Deutsche-Australische Dampfschiffs Gesellschaft 1909-14, interned 1914-19, ceded to the United Kingdom in 1919 and in service until sold in 1924.
- SS Iserlohn (1922), in service with Deutsche-Australische Dampfschiffs Gesellschaft 1922-26, acquired by Hamburg-Amerikanische Packetfarhrt Aktien-Gesellschaft and served until sunk during World War II
