= Modlin =

Modlin may refer to:

- Modlin, Nowy Dwór Mazowiecki, a village until 1961, now a district of Nowy Dwór Mazowiecki, Poland
- Modlin Army, a Polish army during the invasion of Poland in 1939
- Battle of Modlin, a battle during the Polish September Campaign
- Modlin Fortress, a fortress in Nowy Dwór Mazowiecki, Poland, constructed in the 19th century
- Modlin Airport, an airport serving the Warsaw area
- ORP Wilia, from 1940 a merchant ship SS Modlin, a ship of the Polish Merchant Navy
