= Morfa =

Morfa may refer to:

== Places ==
- Conwy Morfa, North Wales, United Kingdom
- Morfa, Bridgend, South Wales, United Kingdom - an electoral ward
- Morfa, Swansea, South Wales, United Kingdom
- Morfa Harlech National Nature Reserve, north of Harlech, Wales

== Miscellaneous ==
- Morfa (drug), a highly potent opiate analgesic drug
