= Augustus Dayton Clark =

- Died: 1990; Northern Westchester Hospital, Mount Kisco, New York, U.S.
- Education: United States Naval Academy
- Military career
- Service years: c. 1922–1945
- Rank: Captain
- Commands: USS Potomac (CO, 1936–1938), Force Mulberry A (CO, 1944)
- Conflicts: Invasion of Normandy
- Other work: Advertising Department, Philadelphia Bulletin (1945–1965)

Augustus Dayton Clark (died 1990), a 1922 graduate of the United States Naval Academy and a United States Navy captain, was commanding officer of Force Mulberry A (a Mulberry harbour) at Omaha Beach during the Invasion of Normandy on June 6, 1944.

== 1920s ==
After graduating from the US Naval Academy with a Bachelor of Science degree, Clark served for two years in USS Wyoming. He served for a further two years in USS Kane before attending the US Naval Submarine School at New London, Connecticut, in 1926. Between 1927 and 1929 he was assigned to USS James K. Paulding. He then moved on to attend the Post Graduate School, General Line Course at Annapolis in 1929-30.

== 1930s ==
The 1930s began with Clark acting as navigational instructor at the US Naval Academy in 1930-31. He returned to the sea in 1931-32 aboard the USS Constitution and then attended the Chemical Warfare School in 1932. His next appointment came with USS Marblehead, where he was based from 1932 to 1934. The next two years were spent back at the US Naval Academy as aide to the superintendent. From 1936 to 1938 he was the commanding officer of the presidential yacht, USS Potomac, as well as aide at the White House. The years 1938 to 1940 saw Clark at sea with USS Phoenix before being made inspector of guns at the Naval Gun Factory in Washington, D.C.

== 1940s and the Second World War ==
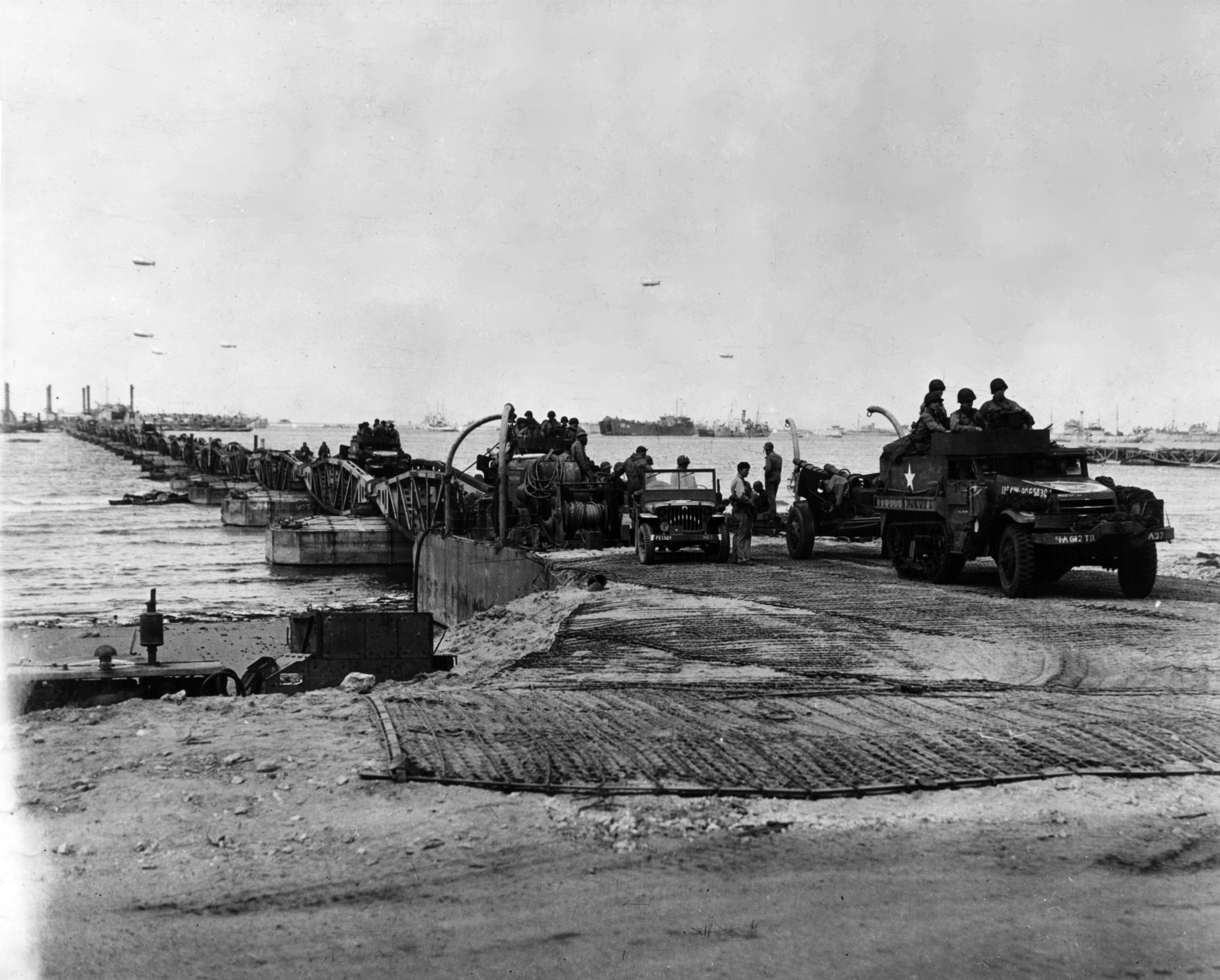
U.S. Army vehicles roll ashore on one of the floating causeways of the "Mulberry" artificial harbor off "Omaha" Beach, 16 June 1944. The causeway had been erected by U.S. Navy SeaBees. Note the M3 half-track in the lead, towing a howitzer, and the Jeep behind it with a semi-circle marking painted on its grill.

He was assigned as assistant naval attaché in London and US naval observer attached to the Royal Navy's Force H under Vice Admiral James Sommerville in the Western Mediterranean in 1940-41. In 1941 he became operations officer on the staff of Vice Admiral Robert L. Ghormley in London. The following year, 1941–42, was again spent as liaison officer attached to Vice Admiral Sommerville but this time with the British Far Eastern and Indian Ocean Fleet. Clark then returned to the United States in 1942-43 to join the staff of the Commander in Chief of the US Fleet in Washington D.C. He served there as part of the Readiness Division dealing with tactical analysis. Clark returned to Europe on the staff of Rear Admiral Alan Goodrich Kirk in London in 1943-44. From there he was appointed commanding officer of Mulberry A (CTF 128) as part of the D-Day Landings on 6 June 1944. Clark sailed to the D-Day beaches aboard SC-1329, a submarine chaser built in 1943 by Simms Bros. of Dorchester, Massachusetts.

Later in 1944 he received his final appointment as Chief of Staff to Rear Admiral John E. Wilkes, commander of ports and bases in France.

== Later life ==
After retiring from the navy in 1945, Clark joined the advertising department of the Philadelphia Bulletin. It was a position he resigned from in the spring of 1965 in order to manage the family farm at Katonah, New York. He died from pneumonia at Northern Westchester Hospital in Mount Kisco, New York.

== See also ==
USS SC-1329 photograph - US National Archives Catalogue
