= Hugh Iorys Hughes =

Welsh civil engineer (1902–1977)

Hugh Iorys Hughes (16 April 1902 – 16 August 1977) was a Welsh civil engineer and keen yachtsman who submitted ideas to the War Office for the design of the Mulberry harbours used in Operation Overlord.

Hughes was born in Bangor, where he attended Friars' School, and grew up in the Conwy area, becoming familiar with its waters. He studied engineering at the University of Sheffield. Afterwards he went to work for Owen Williams, a designer of concrete structures, specialising in bridges. On the outbreak of war, he was unable to join the armed services because he was now in a reserved occupation.

In 1917 Churchill drafted plans for the capture of the islands of Borkum and Sylt, off the Dutch and Danish coasts. He planned to use sunken caissons filled with sand to form an artificial breakwater on the seabed. The proposal was shelved and forgotten. In 1940 the civil engineer Guy Maunsell wrote to the War Office with a proposal for an artificial harbour, but the idea was not adopted. In 1942 Hughes came up with a similar idea for using caissons as part of a jetty while working as a civil engineer in London. He also submitted his plans to the War Office, and these were ignored until Hughes' brother, Alain Sior Hughes, who was a Commander in the Royal Naval Volunteer Reserve, drew attention to the documents.

Following Winston Churchill's memo Piers For Use On Beaches, dated 30 May 1942, the Mulberry project gained momentum under the direction of Major General D J McMullen and civil engineer Brigadier Bruce White. An early priority was the construction of trial installations in the Clyde estuary at Gare Loch. Hughes designed and supervised construction of a prototype jetty consisting of 'Hippo' concrete caissons sunk on the sea bed supporting 'Crocodile' steel roadway bridge units which spanned between the Hippos. The prototype was built at Conwy Morfa near Hughes' home town of Conwy and towed to Garlieston, Wigtownshire, in Scotland, where it was installed and tested against two other designs, both of which were floating roadways; the "Swiss Roll", designed by R M Hamilton, was made of canvas and steel cables, while the "Whale" roadway designed by Allan Beckett consisted of flexible bridge spans mounted on pontoons. During the testing a storm washed away the Swiss Roll and created scour of the sea bed around the Hippo units, which in turn led to them tilting, resulting in the failure of the Crocodile spans. The Whale roadway design survived the tests undamaged and was consequently selected for use on the Mulberry harbours. One of Hughes' Hippo units did survive at Rigg Bay off Garlieston until it collapsed in a storm on 16 March 2006.

In June 1943 the War Office set up a committee of civil engineers to advise on the design of the artificial harbours and the equipment to be used in them. Despite their early submissions to the War Office, neither Maunsell nor Hughes was appointed to the committee.

In 1946, Hughes married Jane Vernon. After competing in several long-distance yachting events, he co-founded the Ocean Cruising Club in 1954. Later in the decade, he was involved in the building of the Blackwall Tunnel. He suffered a heart attack in 1960, and eventually retired to West Mersea.

Hughes' ashes were spread in the Menai Straits after his death in Colchester, Essex. His former family house in Bangor is now let to students of Bangor University, and has a Blue plaque outside it in his honour. There is also a plaque to his memory in the museum at Arromanches.
