= Robert Lochner (engineer) =

Inventor of the Bombardon breakwater (1904–1965)

Robert Lochner MBE
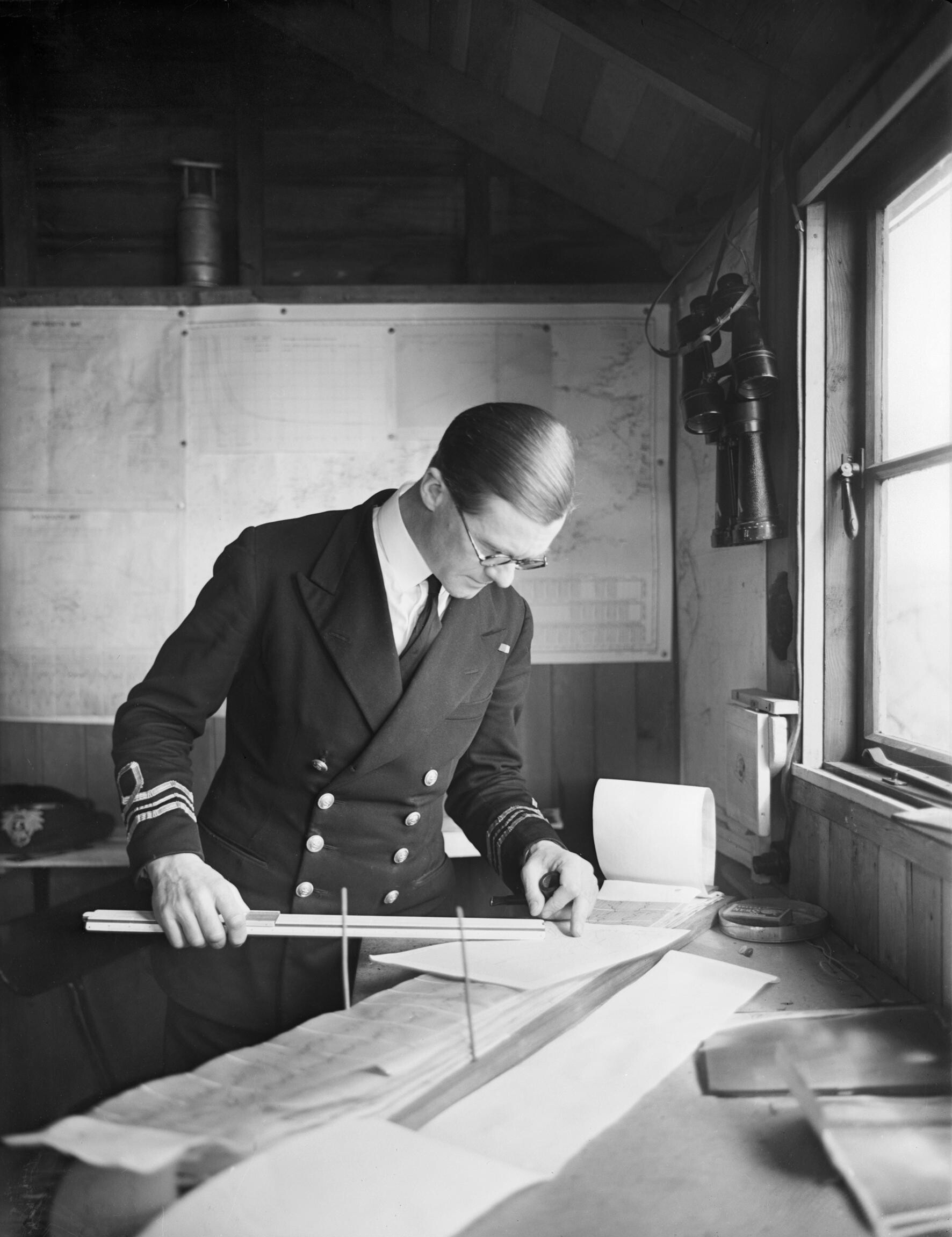
- Lieutenant Commander R. A. Lochner working at Short Lake House in Weymouth, Dorset in April 1944
- Born: 1904
- Died: 1965 (aged 60–61)
- Known for: inventor of the Bombardon breakwater

Robert Lochner MBE (1904–1965) was the inventor of the Bombardon breakwater, an integral part of the Mulberry harbour, which helped the successful invasion of the Normandy beaches in June 1944.

== Background ==
Before the war, Lochner was a qualified engineer, he worked for 14 years for Crompton Parkinson Ltd in design, production and sales positions, before taking up an appointment as sales manager for Laurence, Scott & Electromotors Ltd, moving to Rats Castle at about the same time.

He was also an amateur sailor, and owner of his own sailing boat, the Odette. Amongst other achievements, he successfully completed the 208-mile RORC race in 1939.

== War research ==
With war imminent, on 30 August 1939, he wrote to Admiral Lawrence volunteering his services as an experienced sailor and successful manager and was commissioned within 18 days. His days at sea came to an abrupt end when he was spotted in his glasses on board ship, and reassigned to research efforts. With the onset of war the Admiralty was seriously concerned by Germany's magnetic mines, which did not attach to ships' hulls but which detected the metal of the ships' hulls disrupting their magnetic fields, and sank 15 ships in short order. However, the defusing of a mine dropped by aircraft at Shoeburyness in November allowed a solution to be developed within one week. Lochner was assigned to the research efforts. Together with a team of fellow scientists, he invented the degaussing girdle, a skirt fitted to the hulls of ships, and energised by a special electric current which countered the threat from these mines, securing the future of the north Atlantic convoys on which Britain's war effort depended.

In 1944 France was occupied by the Nazis, the Allied Forces hatched a plan to attack the Germans on French soil. D-Day would not have been possible, due to the rough seas if it wasn't for one major element, the Mulberry Harbour.

One of the major challenges facing the D-Day landings was to secure a European port for the delivery of essential supplies, but instead of capturing an existing port, the Allies decided on an audacious plan to build temporary harbours off the coast of Normandy.

The big challenge in the rough seas of the English Channel was to create a breakwater to protect the concrete landings from the vicious waves and Robert Lochner was the man chosen by Churchill to lead a group of scientists known as The Wheezers And Dodgers to solve this challenge.

The Wheezers And Dodgers, under Lochner's leadership were to play a critical role in winning the war.

== Bombardon breakwater ==
Recovering from flu at the family home in Haslemere in Surrey in the spring of 1943, he had an inspiration. While sitting in the bath playing with his hand flannel he noticed that when he made waves on one side of the flannel, on the other side the waters were calm. He jumped out of the bath, dressed and grabbed an old rubber lilo and formed a 'keel' by bending it lengthways and sewing the two sides together. Then, with the help of his wife, Mary Lochner, they made waves on one side with a spade and experimented all day in the family pond until he found that waves only exert their force to a relatively shallow depth, completely revolutionising the approach to the solution.

By July 1943 a mathematical theory to support the approach had been evolved and in August 1943 experiments began in Portsmouth. The breakwaters were 200 ft long (61 m), 25 ft high (7.6 m), and 25 ft wide (7.6 m), with gigantic airbags divided into three compartments separated by canvas walls proofed with rubber.

Later that summer, Lochner and his fellow scientists flew to Canada for the Quebec Conference to report the progress of the harbours to Franklin Roosevelt and Winston Churchill. The decision to go ahead was taken and full-scale trials of the floating breakwater started in April 1944. During the trial, an onshore gale produced heavy seas, but Robert's bombardons calmed the waves effectively.

Assembling two Mulberry harbours, beginning on 7 June 1944 (the day after the landings), was one of the most remarkable engineering feats in history.

A total of 1,500,000 tons of harbour equipment had to be taken across the channel in an operation involving 150 Allied tugs, and by D-Day plus 12, most of Lochner's floating steel breakwaters were in position. Lochner's bombardons were effectively temporary structures liable to storm damage, and should not be confused with the heavy concrete Phoenix breakwaters which can still be seen at Arromanches.

On 23 July, Churchill visited the harbours and on his return stated: "This miraculous port has played and will continue to play a most important part in the liberation of Europe".

As a reward for his war efforts contributing to the Mulberry harbours, he received the remarkable sum of £5,000.

== Later career ==
After the war, Lochner had a third career, qualifying and practicing as a successful patent and trademark barrister. He was due to be appointed as a Queen's Counsel at the time of his death.
