= Morfa Conwy =

Beach landform and suburb of Conwy, north Wales

Coordinates: 53.292°N 3.848°W

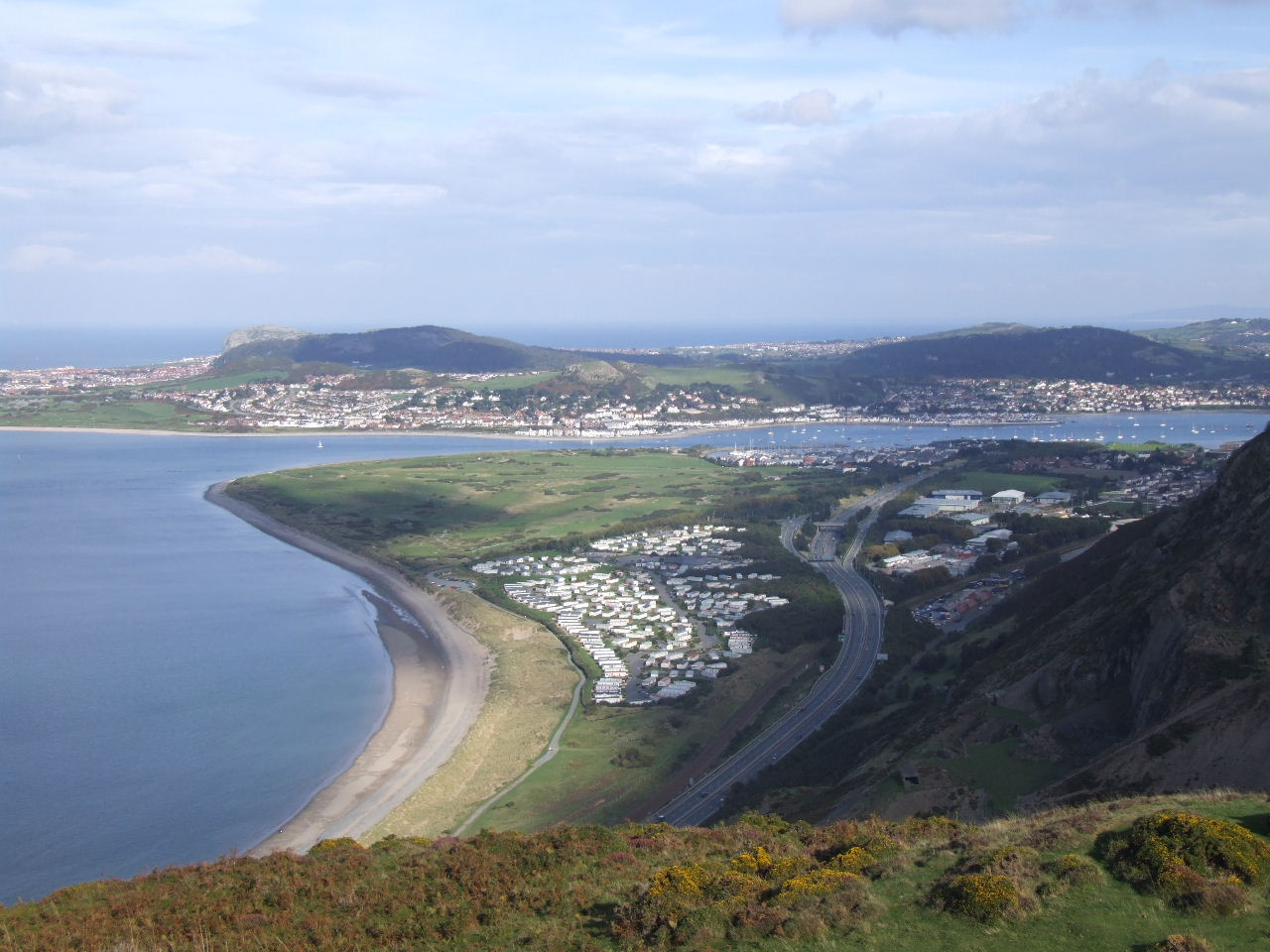
View of Morfa Conwy from Penmaen-bach, with the River Conwy, Deganwy and Creuddyn peninsula

Morfa Conwy is a spit formed originally of marshy sand, north of the western end of the modern A55 entrance to Conwy in Conwy county borough, north-west Wales. A widely used corruption of the place name is Conwy Morfa, likely to have come about from the nearby Conway Marsh changing to Conway Morfa. The North Wales Coast Line railway once had a stop at 'Conway Morfa'.

Known locally as "The Morfa" (Welsh, Y Morfa - meaning the sea marsh), it shapes the south side of the estuary of the River Conwy. Today a large sandy bay, which at low tide forms part of the extensive sandy beaches and mussel banks of Conwy Bay, Morfa Conwy has many developments on its land, including:

- A beach – a large sandy bay
- The golf club – possibly where golf was first played in Wales
- A marina – Conwy Quays, developed by Crest Nicholson, managed by a third party
- An industrial estate – on the south-side of the A55 road

== Golf course ==
In 1869, three Scots laid out a few holes on Morfa Conwy, and in doing so may have been the first to play golf on Welsh soil. In 1875 members from The Royal Liverpool Golf Club, Hoylake, realised the potential of the Morfa Conwy, and had a 12-hole course professionally laid out. On 30 June 1890 The Caernarvonshire (Conwy) Golf Club was formed, and on 30 July the Club's first Captain, Mr. Sydney Platt, opened the club house – a donated military mess hut from the local army base. In 1895, the club became one of the founding members of the Welsh Golfing Union, and after extending the course to eighteen holes staged the first Welsh National Championship.

Today it is a typical links course, with an abundance of gorse and wind adding to the challenge. Douglas Adams, the golfing painter, created three of his most famous paintings on Morfa Conwy: A Difficult Bunker, The Putting Green and The Drive. These are on display in the present club house, completed in 1996, the fifth since 1875.

== Mulberry Harbour ==
There is a debate as to who came up with the design for the Mulberry Harbour, but what is known is that North Walian civil engineer Hugh Iorys Hughes was given the task of proving one of the competing designs – the one to which he had most input. The prototypes were constructed at the Morfa, with the area transformed into a huge construction site and over 1000 labourers were drafted in. These included Oleg Kerensky, son of former Russian Prime Minister Alexander Kerensky, who supervised the construction process. Hughes constructed three 'Hippo' caissons, which were towed from the Morfa to the test site at Rigg Bay, on the Solway Firth near Garlieston, Scotland. The site of full production was behind what is now the second green, before the caissons were launched into the River Conwy estuary for their journey south, where they were ultimately to play a key role in the D-Day landings.

== Football ==
Llandudno Junction F.C. had been resident at Morfa Conwy for some time, but with falling attendances and high costs due to the Entertainment tax, by the 1953–54 season they and local rivals Conwy Borough occupied the bottom two places in the Welsh League (North) – a complete reverse of the previous season. An agreement was struck, and Borough United were created who left the Morfa and played for 15 seasons at Nant-y-Coed, Llandudno Junction, where they wore the maroon and white colours of Llandudno Junction. In the 1962–63 season, they won the Welsh Cup, beating League opposition in Newport County F.C. 2–1 – although they made a £73 loss. They thus entered the UEFA Cup Winners' Cup, beating Maltese team Sliema Wanderers in the first round, but lost out to Czech cup-winners Slovan Bratislava 4–0. In 1967, Nant-y-Coed’s owners, the Irish Oblates of Mary Immaculate order, evicted the club. The football club could not move or merge with various other local clubs, and rejected a return to the available Morfa site which lacked facilities other than the pitch itself. Resigning from the Welsh League, they survived two more seasons as nomads before folding in 1969.

== Llandudno Rugby Club ==
For the 1953–54 season the Llandudno Rugby Club became established on the Morfa, after Conwy Football Club left the Morfa sports ground. In 1957 a fire destroyed the dressing rooms at the Morfa ground, and the club departed to a new ground in Llandudno.
