= SS Iserlohn (1909) =

Cargo ship

History
- Name: Iserlohn (1909-21); Union City (1921-24); Wasaborg (1924-35); Erica (1935-40); Empire Defiance (1940-44)
- Owner: Deutsche-Australische Dampfschiffs Gesellschaft (1909-19); British Shipping Controller (1919-21); William Reardon Smith & Sons (1921-24); J A Zachariassen & Co (1924-35); Achille Lauro & Co (1935-40); Ministry of War Transport (1940-44)
- Operator: Deutsche-Australische Dampfschiffs Gesellschaft (1909-19); British India Steam Navigation Co Ltd (1919-21); St Just Steamship Co Ltd (1921-24); J A Zachariassen & Co (1924-35); Achille Lauro & Co (1935-40); T & J Brocklebank (1940-43); J & J Denholm (1944)
- Port of registry: Hamburg, Germany (1909-19); United Kingdom (1919-21); (United Kingdom) Bideford (1921-24); Uusikaupunki, Finland (1924-35); (Kingdom of Italy) Naples, Italy (1935-40); (United Kingdom) London (1940-44)
- Builder: Reiherstieg Schiffswerfte & Maschinenfabrik
- Yard number: 426
- Launched: 14 August 1909
- Out of service: 7 June 1944
- Identification: United Kingdom Official Number 143916 (1919-24, 1940-44); Finnish Official Number 323 (1927-35); Italian Official Number 438 (1935-40); Code Letters VBTP (1927-33); Code Letters OHBR (1934-35); Code Letters IBNN (1935-40); Code Letters GWLC (1940-44)
- Fate: Scuttled as blockship in 1944, salvaged and scrapped in 1951

General characteristics
- Type: Cargo ship (1909-43); Storage hulk (1943-44); Blockship (1944-51)
- Tonnage: 4,667 GRT; 2,760 NRT; 7,669 DWT
- Length: 121.61 m (399 ft 0 in)
- Beam: 16.37 m (53 ft 8 in)
- Depth: 7.55 m (24 ft 9 in)
- Propulsion: Triple expansion steam engine

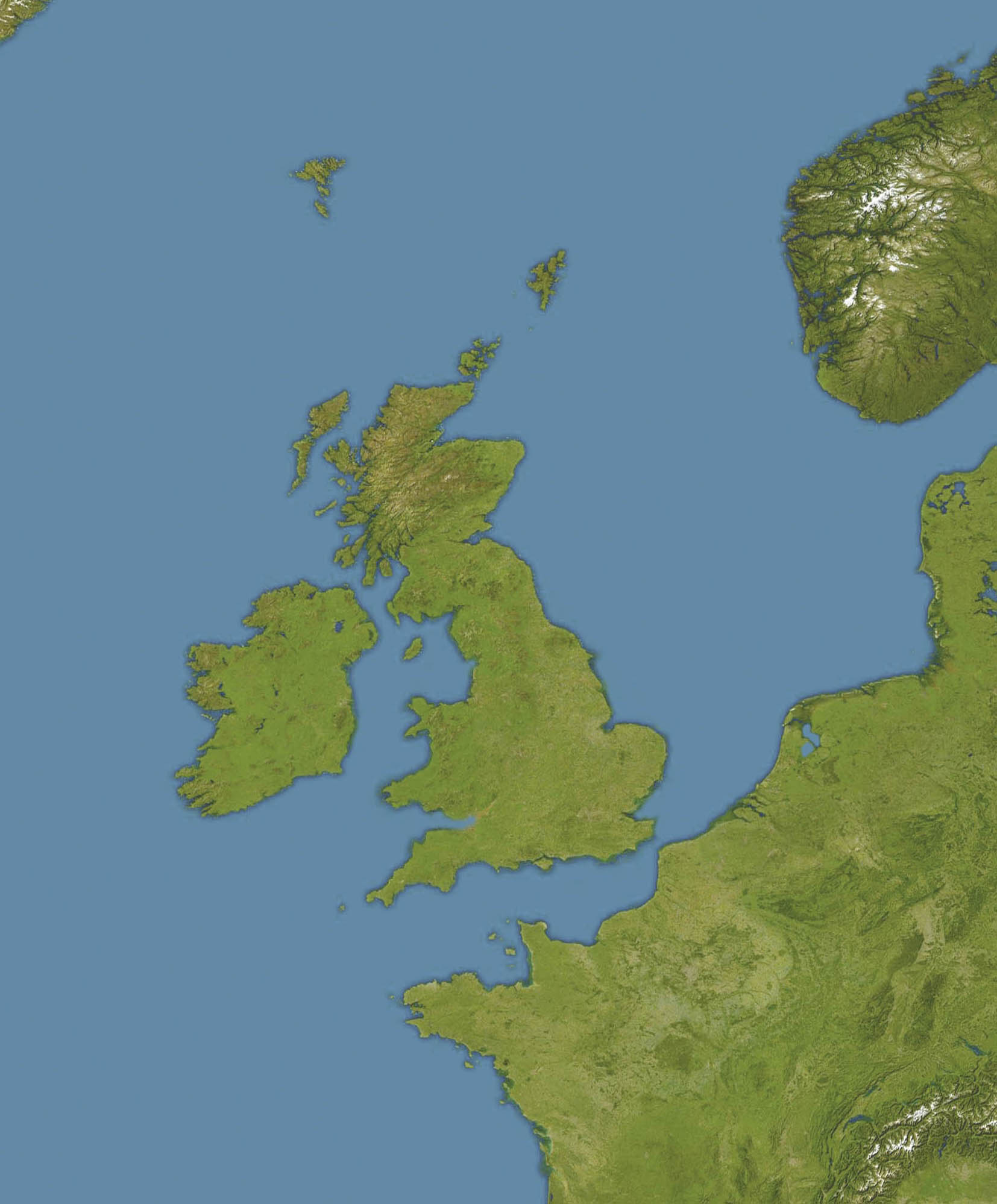
Location of the scuttling of Empire Defiance.

Iserlohn was a 4,667 GRT cargo ship that was built in 1909 by Reiherstieg Schiffswerfte & Maschinenfabrik, Hamburg, Germany. She was ceded to the United Kingdom in 1919, passing to the Admiralty. In 1921, she was sold into merchant service and renamed Union City. She was sold to Finland in 1924 and renamed Wasaborg. In 1935, she was sold to Italy and renamed Erica. In 1940, she was seized by the United Kingdom and passed to the Ministry of War Transport (MoWT). Renamed Empire Defiance, she served until June 1944, when she was sunk as a blockship at Sword, Ouistreham, France in support of Operation Overlord. She was salvaged in 1951 and scrapped at Antwerp, Belgium.

== Description ==
The ship was built in 1909 by Reiherstieg Schiffswerfte & Maschinenfabrik, Hamburg. She was yard number 426.

The ship was 121.61 metres (399 ft 0 in) long, with a beam of 16.37 metres (53 ft 8 in). She had a depth of 7.55 metres (24 ft 9 in). She was assessed at 4,667 GRT, 2,760 NRT. Her DWT was 7,669.

The ship was propelled by a triple expansion steam engine, which had cylinders of 66 and 121 and 195 cm (26 and 47 5/8 and 76 3/4 in) diameter by 122 centimetres (48 in) stroke. The engine was built by Reiherstieg Schiffswerfte & Maschinenfabrik, Hamburg.

== History ==
Iserlohn was built for Deutsche-Australische Dampfschiffs Gesellschaft, Hamburg. She was launched on 14 August 1909. Her port of registry was Hamburg. In 1914, Iserlohn was interned at Batavia, Dutch East Indies. She was ceded to the United Kingdom in 1919, passing to the British Shipping Controller. She was operated under the management of the British-India Steam Navigation Co Ltd. Iserlohn was allocated the Official Number 143916.

In 1921, Iserlohn was advertised for sale "to British Nationals only". She was available for inspection at London. She was sold to William Reardon Smith & Sons and renamed Union City. She was operated under the management of the St Just Steamship Co Ltd, Bideford, Devon. In 1924, Union City was sold to J A Zachariassen & Co, Uusikaupunki, Finland and was renamed Wasaborg. The Finnish Official Number 323 was allocated in 1927. Wasaborg used the Code Letters VBTP from 1927–33, and OHBR from 1934. On 26 December 1932, a ship named Wasaborg was involved in a collision with the London and North Eastern Railway ship Hartlepool off Terneuzen, Netherlands. Both ships suffering only light damage.

In 1935, Wasaborg was sold to Achille Lauro & Co, Naples, Italy and was renamed Erica. The Italian Official Number 438 and Code Letters IBNN were allocated. On 10 June 1940, Erica was in port at Liverpool, Lancashire, United Kingdom. She was seized and passed to the MoWT as a prize of war. Renamed Empire Defiance, she was placed under the management of T & J Brocklebank. She was reallocated the Official Number 143916 and allocated the Code Letters GWLC.

Empire Defiance departed from Liverpool on 18 July as a member of Convoy OB 188, which dispersed at sea on 27 July. Her destination was Freetown, Sierra Leone, where she arrived on 3 September. She departed from Freetown on 20 September for Cape Town, South Africa, arriving on 2 November and departing six days later for Durban, where she arrived on 8 November. Five days later, Empire Defiance departed from Durban for Calcutta, India, arriving on 10 December.

Empire Defiance departed from Calcutta on 29 April 1941 for Madras, arriving on 3 May and departing two days later for Colombo, Ceylon, where she arrived on 9 May. On 11 May, she departed for Durban, arriving on 30 May. She departed from Durban on 12 June for Cape Town, arriving on 17 June and departing four days later for St Thomas, United States Virgin Islands, where she arrived on 18 July. The next day, Empire Defiance departed from St Thomas for Halifax, Nova Scotia, Canada, arriving on 27 July. She departed from Halifax on 6 August for Sydney, Cape Breton, arriving the next day. She departed from Sydney on 10 August as a member of Convoy SC 40, which arrived at Liverpool on 29 August. Empire Defiance was carrying general cargo.

Empire Defiance was a member of Convoy OS 8, which departed from Liverpool on 3 October and arrived at Freetown on 26 October. She was carrying general cargo with a stated destination of Calcutta. She departed from Freetown on 30 October for Cape Town, arriving on 17 November. On 29 November, she departed for Durban, where she arrived on 4 December, departing four days later for Trincomalee, Ceylon, where she arrived on 30 December.

Empire Defiance departed from Trincomalee on 11 January 1942 for Calcutta, where she arrived on 17 January. She departed from Calcutta on 8 March for Cuddalore, arriving on 12 March and departing two days later for Colombo, where she arrived on 17 March. She departed on 30 March for Durban, arriving on 16 April and departing eight days later for Cape Town, where she arrived on 29 May. She departed from Cape Town on 4 May and arrived at Freetown on 19 May. Empire Defiance was a member of Convoy SL 112, which departed from Freetown on 4 June and arrived at Liverpool on 23 June. She was carrying a cargo of jute, pig iron and tea. She left the convoy at Loch Ewe on 22 June, joining Convoy WN 300, which departed on 23 June and arrived at Methil, Fife two days later. She left the convoy at Dundee, Forfarshire.

Empire Defiance the sailed to Methil, where she joined Convoy FS 847, which departed on 5 July and arrived at Southend, Essex two days later. She left the convoy at the Tyne on 6 July. She departed the Tyne on 13 July to join Convoy FN 758, which had departed from Southend on 12 July and arrived at Methil two days later. Empire Defiance was a member of Convoy EN 116, which departed from Methil on 27 July and arrived at Loch Ewe two days later. Her destination was Oban, Argyllshire, where she arrived on 30 July. She sailed from Oban on 1 August to join Convoy OS 36, which departed from Liverpool on 31 July and arrived at Freetown on 18 August. She was carrying a cargo described as "stores" destined for Calcutta. She sailed on to Durban, from where she departed on 15 September 1942 for Colombo, arriving on 1 October and departing three days later for Trincomalee, where she arrived on 6 October. Empire Defiance departed from Trincomalee on 17 October but arrived back there three days later. She departed again on 11 November for Calcutta, where she arrived on 18 November.

Empire Defiance departed from Calcutta on 20 January 1943 for Madras, arriving three days later. She departed from Madras three days after that, arriving at Colombo on 2 February. Empire Defiance departed from Colombo on 14 February for Cape Town, where she arrived on 7 March, departing four days later for Freetown, arriving on 26 March. Empire Defiance was a member of Convoy SL 127, which departed from Freetown on 31 March and arrived at Liverpool on 24 April. She was carrying a cargo of copra, mails and pig iron, as well as twelve passengers. She was bound for Loch Ewe, where she arrived on 22 April. She then joined Convoy WN419 to Methil and Convoy FS 1099 to Southend, where she arrived on 27 April.

Empire Defiance departed from Southend on 2 June with for Loch Ewe, which was reached on 6 June via convoys FN 1037 and EN 234. She then sailed to Oban, from where she departed on 9 June to join Convoy ONS 10, which departed from Liverpool on 8 June and arrived at Halifax on 27 June. She was carrying general cargo destined for New York, United States. The then joined Convoy XB 60, which departed from Halifax that day and arrived at the Cape Cod Canal, Massachusetts on 29 June. Arrival at New York was on 30 June. Empire Defiance departed from New York on 4 July for the Hampton Roads, Virginia. A return trip was made to Philadelphia, Pennsylvania before she returned to New York, from where she departed on 21 July for Boston, Massachusetts.Empire Defiance was a member of Convoy BX 75, which departed from Boston on 24 July and arrived at Halifax two days later. She then joined Convoy SC 143, which departed from Halifax on 28 September and arrived at Liverpool on 12 October. She was carrying a cargo of grain and general cargo. On arrival at Liverpool Empire Defiance was laid up, and used as a storage hulk.

In 1944, management of Empire Defiance was transferred to J & J Denholm. She departed from Liverpool under escort on 7 April bound for Oban, from where she departed under escort on 30 May for Poole Dorset. Empire Defiance was a member of the Corncob 1 Convoy. On 7 June 1944, Empire Defiance was scuttled at Sword, Ouistreham, Calvados, France as part of Gooseberry 5. She was salvaged in 1951 and towed by the tugs Seaman and Superman to Belgium for scrapping. On 21 August, Empire Defiance had to be beached off The Mole, Zeebrugge after developing a leak. She was refloated and arrived on 15 September at Antwerp for scrapping.
