= USS SC-1329 =

American Submarine Chaser

History

United States
- Laid down: 10 October 1942
- Launched: 19 April 1943
- Commissioned: 8 May 1943
- Fate: Transferred to Coast Guard, 7 February 1946, sold commercial and sunk 1979

General characteristics
- Displacement: 98 tons
- Length: 110 ft 10 in (33.78 m)
- Beam: 17 ft 11 in (5.46 m)
- Draught: 6 ft 6 in (1.98 m)
- Propulsion: two General Motors 16-184A "pancake" engines, two shafts
- Speed: 21 kts
- Complement: 27
- Armament: one single 40 mm Bofor gun mount forward, three Oerlikon 20 mm guns aft, two dcp "K Guns", 14 depth charges with six single release chocks, two sets Mk 20 Mousetrap rails with four 7.2 projectiles

USS SC-1329 was an SC-497-class submarine chaser in the United States Navy.

SC-1329 was laid down 10 October 1942, by Simms Brothers, Dorchester, Massachusetts, and was launched 19 April 1943. The ship was commissioned 8 May 1943.

USS SC-1329 served in the English Channel and was based in Portsmouth, England. She participated in the June 1944 Normandy landings.

The ship returned to Miami in June–July 1945 to prepare for assignment to war in the Pacific. She was transferred to the United States Coast Guard on 7 February 1946. The ship was sold to a business in Brooklyn, NY and became a day fishing boat named the F/V Elmar. It was resold and relocated to Florida. It finally was sunk in 1979 in the St. Johns River in Florida.
