= ORP Wilia =

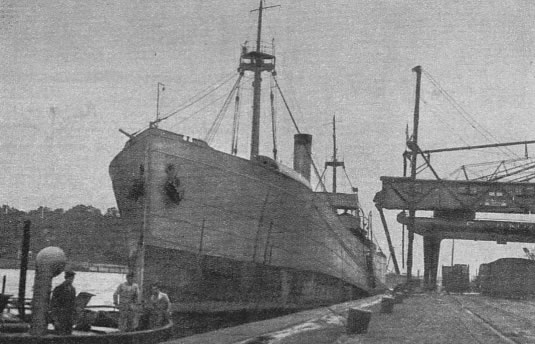

History

Poland
- Name: ORP Wilia
- Launched: 26 May 1906
- Commissioned: 8 August 1925
- Fate: Transferred to Polish merchant marine as Modlin on 30 July 1940; Scuttled as part of an artificial harbour, 1944

General characteristics
- Tonnage: 3578 Gross Register Tonnage
- Displacement: 8400 tons
- Length: 108 metres
- Beam: 14.85 m
- Installed power: 1350 HP
- Propulsion: VTE steam engine
- Speed: 10 kn (19 km/h; 12 mph)

ORP Wilia (old spelling ORP Wilja) was a transport and training ship of the Polish Navy of the Second Polish Republic, from 1940 a merchant ship SS Modlin.

== Construction ==
The ship was built in 1906 as a freighter Ganelon in the shipyard Flensburger Schiffbau Gesellschaft in Flensburg, Germany, for Roland Linie AG, with a home port Bremen. From 1907 it was operated by H.C. Horn and renamed Hilda Horn (home port Lübeck). In 1911 it was sold to Deutsche Levante Linie in Hamburg and operated on the Mediterranean with a name Tinos. After an outbreak of World War I, it was interned in Pireus in August 1914. In 1916 it was taken over by the French there, and impressed into service as a military transport Le Bourget. After the war it was sold in 1922 to Charles Schaffiano and sailed under the French flag as the Laurent Schaffiano.

== Polish Navy ==
In 1925 the ship was bought by the newborn Polish Navy. After a refit and adaptation in France, the Polish flag was raised on the ship on 8 August 1925 in Cherbourg. The ship was renamed ORP Wilia, after the river Wilia (until 1936 there was an old spelling: Wilja). Initially the Polish Navy used her to transport arms and equipment, bought in France, to Poland. From 1928 she served mainly as a training ships for cadets. At the start of the Second World War the ship was in the port of Casablanca on a training cruise. On 13 September 1939 she was slightly damaged due to an explosion of the French minelayer Pluton; the Polish sailors took part in a rescue operation. In October 1940 she was laid up in Port Lyautey. It was next decided to transfer the ship to the merchant navy, and in July 1940 she sailed through Gibraltar to Liverpool, avoiding U-Boots, evacuating over 200 Polish soldiers and airmen from Morocco. On 30 July 1940 she was transferred to the Polish Merchant Navy and renamed Modlin (after a town and fortress).

== Fate ==
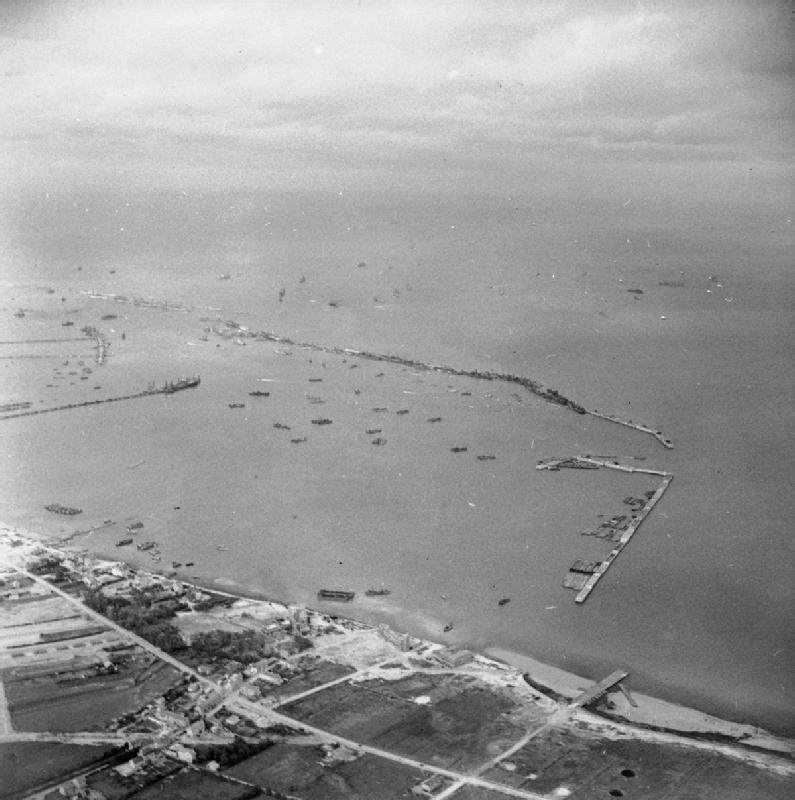
Gooseberry 3 harbour, with a breakwater visible, of sunken ships and concrete blocks. Modlin was sunk near a center of photograph.

The ship entered into operation only after a refit on 1 July 1941 roku, in Ministry of War Transport charter. She undertook five transatlantic cruises in convoys to Canada and back, but an old ship was ill-suited to rough Atlantic weather, and her machinery was worn out, so she had to be repaired in a yard after most cruises. She was also used in coastal convoys. In November 1943 she was laid up. On 8 June 1944 useless ship was scuttled off the coast of Normandy as a part of an artificial breakwater of Mulberry B harbour (Gooseberry 3 at Gold Beach, Arromanches). After the war she was raised and scrapped.
