= Bruce White =

Brigadier Sir Bruce Gordon White (1885–1983) was one of the leading British consulting engineers of his generation. Son of the engineer Robert White (1842–1925), Bruce White joined his father's practice in 1919 together with his brother Colin White in 1923. On his father's death Bruce White became senior partner. After World War II Bruce White was knighted, and the practice became known as Sir Bruce White, Wolfe Barry and Partners. On Sir Bruce's retirement Allan Beckett became senior partner. The family firm continues today as marine consulting engineers Beckett Rankine where Sir Bruce's grandson Gordon Rankine and Allan Beckett's son Tim Beckett are directors.

Born on 5 February 1885, White saw military service in Europe during World War I as a Major in the Royal Engineers; he was involved in the design and construction of Richborough military port near Sandwich in Kent; the port was notable for being equipped with the UK's first electric gantry cranes for cargo handling. White was appointed MBE in 1919.

During World War II White returned to military service with the rank of brigadier. He held the posts of Director of Ports and IWT at the War Office and deputy director, Department of Transportation Tn(5). He was part of the team involved in planning and designing of the "artificial" Mulberry harbours, having been responsible for the development of the four-legged floating pontoons and the floating roadways that became the Spud pier heads and the Whale piers of these two harbours. These were used to supply Allied forces in France after the D-day landings in Normandy. In this capacity he was chairman of the Harbours committee, which was principally made up of civilian consultant civil engineers who undertook the design of Mulberry.

He was appointed a CBE in 1943 and a KBE in 1944. After the war his company was responsible for the design of the Chiswick flyover, Bhavnagar Port, Bombay Marine Oil Terminal, Damman Port, Muara Port, the UK's first container terminal at Tilbury's Berth 30 and Singapore's first container berth. White worked into his nineties.

He died on 29 September 1983.

== Publications ==
The artificial invasion harbours called Mulberry, a personal story by Sir Bruce White KBE, 1980. Published privately and downloadable from here

Beckett Rankine have published Sir Bruce White's archive of papers from the 2nd World War at http://www.mulberryharbours.com

== Sources ==
- Who was Who
- Mulberry – The return in Triumph by Michael Harrison, 1965.
- A Harbour Goes To War: The Story Of Mulberry And The Men Who Made It Happen - J.Evans, R.Walter, E.Palmer; Publisher - South Machars Historical Society, 2000
- A casual interview
