= Allan Beckett =

British engineer

Allan Harry Beckett
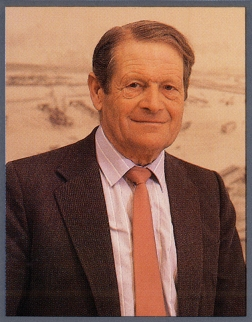
- Born: 4 March 1914; East Ham, London
- Died: 19 June 2005 (aged 91); Farnborough, Kent
- Burial place: Oare churchyard, Faversham, Kent; 51°20′02.47″N 00°52′54.26″E
- Military career
- Allegiance: United Kingdom
- Branch: Royal Engineers
- Service years: 6
- Rank: Major
- Awards: MBE
- Other work: Sir Bruce White, Wolfe Barry & Partners. Beckett Rankine

Allan Harry Beckett MBE (4 March 1914 in East Ham, London Borough of Newham, United Kingdom – 19 June 2005 in Farnborough, London) was an English civil engineer whose design for the 'Whale' floating roadway was crucial to the success of the Mulberry harbour that was used in the Normandy Landings. Starting the war as a sapper digging trenches on the South Coast at the time of the Dunkirk evacuation, Allan Beckett came to play a significant role in the success of the Mulberry harbour used during and after the Normandy landings of June 1944.

His contribution to the Mulberry was to design the floating roadways which connected the pierhead to the shore, and a system of anchors. The roadway had to be strong enough to withstand constant wave action which, as occurred in the appalling weather of June 1944, was much more severe than anticipated. Beckett's design, which had been tested in the severe conditions of Scotland in winter, survived the storm which struck on 19 June 1944, and raged for three days.

== Education and early military service ==
Allan Beckett was born on 4 March 1914 in East Ham, London; the eldest of three children of George William Harry Beckett and his wife Emma (née Stokes). Allan's father was a professional soldier in the Royal Field Artillery and was proud to be one of the 'Old Contemptibles'. London Borough of Newham have placed a blue heritage plaque on the house in Montpelier Gardens where the family lived. Allan's first interest was mechanical engineering – he was a keen model maker, building intricate model boat engines when a teenager. However his father persuaded him to study civil engineering at university as the career prospects were better.

He read civil engineering at the University of London and was then apprenticed to Sanders and Forster, steelwork and structural engineers from 1930 to 1933. From there he moved to the bridge department of consulting engineers A. J. Bridle until the war began. He volunteered for the Royal Engineers in January 1940 and, after basic sapper training, was at the time of the Dunkirk evacuation engaged in trench digging, watch duties and manning a searchlight at Folkestone Harbour. He also assisted in the sinking of the block ship SS Umvoti across the harbour's entrance. Commissioned in 1941, he was sent to King's Newton, near Derby, to work for Lieutenant-Colonel W. T. Everall, a specialist on the rapid construction of railway bridges for battlefield use. In this position, he gained valuable experience in assembling light steel bridging.

== The Mulberry Minute ==
The notion of the Mulberry harbour had come from Winston Churchill, determined never to repeat the 1915 debâcle of the amphibious landings over open beaches during the Gallipoli Campaign. On 30 May 1942, with an invasion of the German-occupied Continent only a distant dream, he had prepared a minute for the chief of the Combined Operations Headquarters, headed: Piers for use on beaches.

"They must float up and down with the tide," Churchill noted. "The anchor problem must be mastered. Let me have the best solution worked out. Don’t argue the matter. The difficulties will argue for themselves." These injunctions set down the essentials of the floating piers to enable the vast tonnage of vehicles and stores to be got ashore to support the forces in the field.

In the wake of Churchill's minute Allan Beckett's boss, Lt-Colonel William Teague Everall who was the Chief Bridging Instructor to the War Office, was charged with designing a roadway for use over shelving beaches under tidal conditions. Everall gave Beckett a sketch marked "Top Secret" asking whether, "as a keen sailor", he could make sense of it. The sketch showed a mile-long series of pontoons on legs, linked by bridges covering water that was shallow one end, deep the other. The caption read "Piers for flat beaches", without explanation of what they might be intended for.

Beckett thought the legs an unnecessary complication for a floating bridge. "If you think you can do better, you must make it clear before next Monday when I shall be revisiting the War Office," said Everall. By 2 July 1942 Allan had prepared a sketch drawing of a floating roadway, consisting of a torsionally compliant lozenge-shaped bridge span. He had a tin plate scale model made of one full span and part of an adjacent span to show a junction using spherical bearings. Everall took this model to his meeting at the War Office and returned exultant. "Beckett," he said, "they want six spans built right away, I have promised that you will produce fabrication drawings by the end of the week."

== The Mulberry trials ==
In a week Beckett produced the works drawings and the prototype consisting of six spans of floating roadway was constructed by Braithwaites of West Bromwich. It and two competing schemes (the Hamilton Swiss Roll and the Hughes Caisson Scheme) were tested at Cairn Head, Galloway, where, over a period, they were subjected to severe weather.

Summoned to Scotland to check his system after a particularly fierce storm, Beckett imagined that he was being called ruefully to inspect a mass of twisted and fractured metal. To his immense gratification the floating roadway had survived intact under the severest of torsion, whilst the Hamilton Swiss Roll had been washed away, and the Hughes Caisson, too, had failed. As Beckett later observed: After several more days of rough weather it was not difficult for the chiefs of staff to make a choice. They ordered six miles of the roadway, codenamed 'Whale', to be manufactured, later increased to ten miles.

After designing the roadway, Beckett found that there was no anchor available that was light enough to be easily handled without a lifting vessel, yet had sufficient holding power which he calculated as 20 tons plus a safety factor. Everall was away in America, so Beckett developed a design for an anchor in his own time, performing experiments with models of anchors in the mud at Erith Yacht Club where he was a member. The full-size anchor weighed 330 kg (730 lb) and, during performance tests using a large tug, it held up to 30 tons. The Ministry of Supply ordered 2,332 Kite anchors, as they became known, to be manufactured at a total cost of £89,786, with more than 2,000 of the anchors being used on the two Mulberry harbours.

Naval opinion was sceptical of Beckett's ability to come up with a new design of anchor with the exceptional holding power he claimed for it; consequently the Navy did not use the Kite anchor for mooring the Bombardon floating breakwaters which were the Navy's design responsibility.

== D-Day and after ==
7 June 1944 was D+1 (the day after the start of Operation Overlord); Allan Beckett set out for Arromanches, the site of the British Mulberry, as technical adviser in the field to Montgomery's 21st Army Group. After a day and night at sea, he supervised the installation of the anchors, and over the next few days gave technical advice on installing the Whales.

In the event the Americans at Mulberry A were first to have a pier in operation, on D+5; this remarkable achievement was at least partly due to the Americans installing Whale bridge spans as they arrived mixing up the 25t and 40t capacity spans in a single roadway and omitting up to 80% of the Kite anchors. The more methodical British approach to construction, and the installation of the designed number of anchors, was vindicated in the violent storm of D+13 which damaged Mulberry A beyond repair, whereas Mulberry B survived and continued to function for more than four months, until the opening up of Antwerp in October rendered it less important. After the storm Beckett acted as liaison officer to the Americans for the transfer of such undamaged equipment at Mulberry A as could be used by the British on their harbour.

After his part in the Mulberry project was finished, Beckett carried out various tasks in the wake of the Allied advance. He showed how a stock of abandoned German bridging equipment, located near Brussels, could be put to use; he oversaw the installation of much of the Everall bridging equipment which came into its own as the Allied advance took it over river after river; and he assisted Dutch engineers in repairing gaps in the dykes made by RAF bombers at Walcheren Island. For this, surplus Mulberry units came in useful for plugging the breaches.

The character Major Young in the 1947 historical novel Het verjaagde water by A. den Doolaard, about the recovery works after the inundation of Walcheren, is based on Beckett.

Beckett was appointed MBE for his wartime work. He also received an inventor's award for the design of the Kite anchor.

Allan Beckett's work is commemorated by a memorial dedicated to him in the town of Arromanches-les-Bains. Unveiled by Mr Patrick Jardin, the Mayor of Arromanches, on 6 June 2009, the 65th Anniversary of the D-Day Landings, the monument features a bronze bas relief portrait of Allan by the artist Richard Clarke beneath a full-sized replica of the Kite anchor. The monument is located adjacent to a preserved Whale bridge span.

In September 2011 a stained glass window dedicated to Allan Beckett was installed in St Peter's church, Oare where he is buried. The south facing three light window was designed by artist Petri Anderson and features a Mulberry tree in fruit together with depictions of a Whale floating roadway and a Kite anchor.

== After the war ==
After being demobbed Beckett joined Sir Bruce White, Wolfe Barry and Partners as chief engineer. There he was responsible for projects in India including Mazagon Dock, the Tata locomotive works, the Bombay Marine oil terminal and a self-scouring lock gate to cope with heavily silt-laden waters at Bhavnagar. In the UK he built factories for Bibby. In 1959 he became a partner in the firm, and developed techniques for mini-hydraulic model studies which were used for designing the new port at Muara in Brunei as well as major port expansion work at Aden, Harwich and Cardiff.

As senior partner from 1983 he oversaw all the engineering aspects of a huge contract to build a new port at Dammam in Saudi Arabia. Closer to home there were the design and construction of complex Thames flood defences for north Kent, including the Dartford Creek barrier. In official retirement from 1989, he acted as a consultant to the marine consulting engineering practice Beckett Rankine where his son Tim Beckett and Sir Bruce White's grandson Gordon Rankine were directors.

A yachtsman from boyhood, he also designed and had built 'Pretty Penny' in 1979 – a new yacht made of non-corrosive cupronickel (copper-nickel alloy) – still one of the very few in the world.

== Family ==
With the £3,000 inventor's award he received for his Kite anchor design, he built himself a house in Farnborough, Kent, where he settled.

Allan Beckett married his wife Ida James in 1949. She survives him, with his two sons, his daughter and his ten grandchildren.

== Papers ==
- Some aspects of the design of flexible bridging including "Whale" floating roadways
- River Thames – removable flood barriers (1972)
- The Design and Construction of Bombay Marine Oil Terminal
- A High Capacity Container Terminal – Berth 39 Tilbury Docks
- Design and Construction of Muara Deep Water Port
- The River Hull Tidal Surge Barrier
- Design and Construction of the Dock Entrance at Bhavnagar Port, Gujarat State, India
