= Mulberry harbours =

British Second World War portable temporary harbours

Mulberry harbour
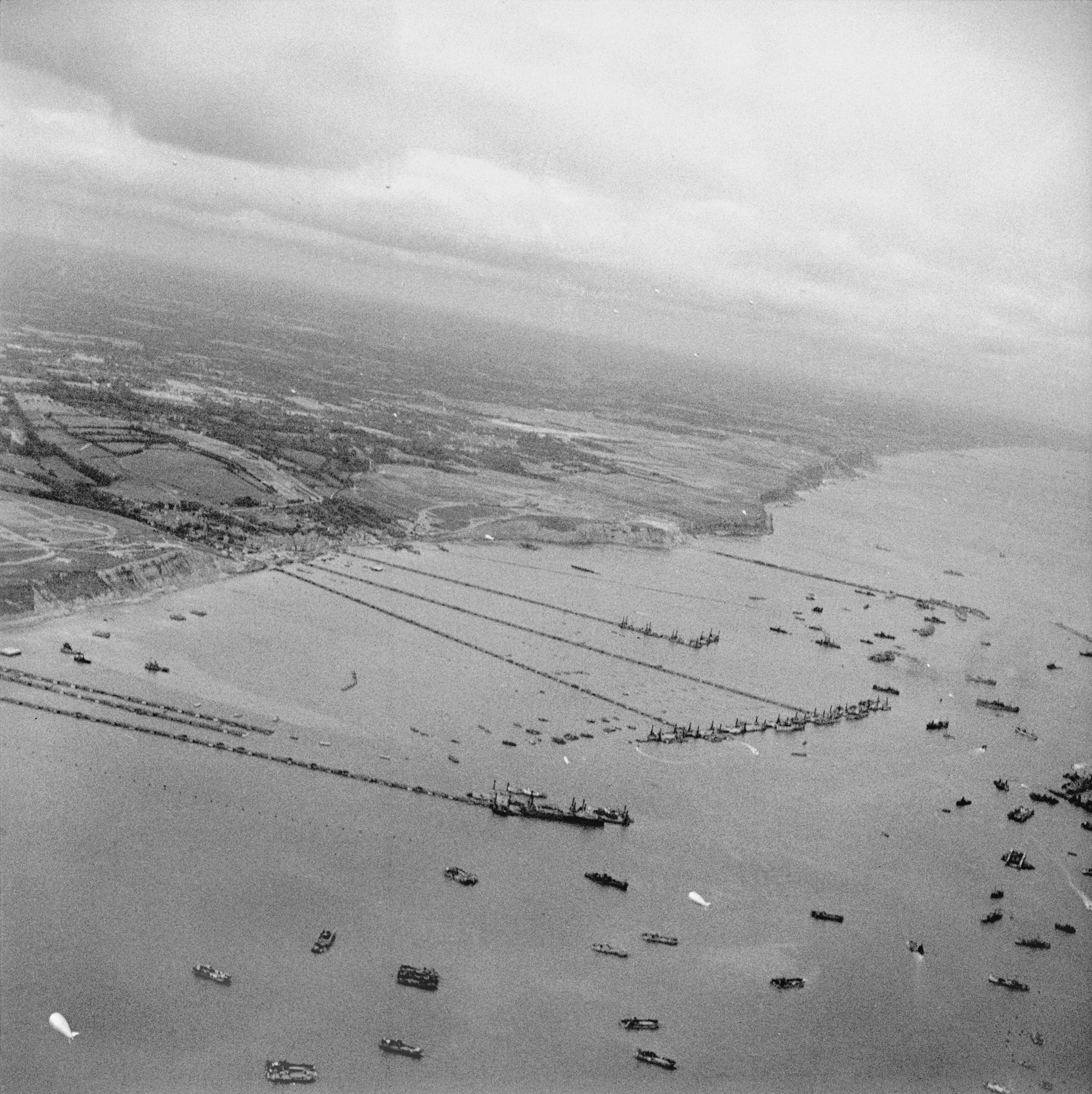
- View of the Mulberry B harbour "Port Winston" at Arromanches in September 1944. Centre and left are "spud" pierheads with floating piers of "whales" and "beetles". At right is 2,000 ft (610 m) of "Swiss roll".

Location
- Location: Arromanches and Omaha Beach, Normandy, France
- Coordinates: 49.3475°N 0.6340°W

Details
- Opened: June 1944
- Closed: March 1945
- Type: Temporary portable harbour
- Purpose: Military equipment, stores and personnel
- Joins: Beach

The Mulberry harbours were two temporary portable harbours developed by the British Admiralty and War Office during the Second World War to facilitate the rapid offloading of cargo onto beaches during the Allied invasion of Normandy in June 1944. They were designed in 1942, then built in under a year in great secrecy; within hours of the Allies creating beachheads after D-Day, sections of the two prefabricated harbours were towed across the English Channel from southern England and placed in position off Omaha Beach (Mulberry "A") and Gold Beach (Mulberry "B"), along with old ships to be sunk as breakwaters.

The Mulberry harbours solved the problem of needing deepwater jetties and a harbour to provide the invasion force with the necessary reinforcements and supplies, and were to be used until major French ports could be captured and brought back into use after repair of the inevitable sabotage by German defenders. Composed of floating but sinkable breakwaters, floating pontoons, piers and floating roadways, this innovative and technically difficult system was being used for the first time.

The Mulberry B harbour at Gold Beach was used for ten months after D-Day, while over two million men, four million tons of supplies and half a million vehicles were landed before it was fully decommissioned. The partially completed Mulberry A harbour at Omaha Beach was damaged on 19 June by a violent storm that arrived from the northeast before the pontoons were securely anchored. After three days, the storm finally abated; the damage was found to be so severe that the harbour was abandoned and the Americans resorted to landing men and material over the open beaches.

== Background ==
The Dieppe Raid of 1942 had shown that the Allies could not rely on being able to penetrate the Atlantic Wall to capture a port on the north French coast. The problem was that large ocean-going ships of the type needed to transport heavy and bulky cargoes and stores needed sufficient depth of water under their keels, together with dockside cranes, to offload their cargo. These were available only at the already heavily defended French harbours. Thus, the Mulberries were created to provide the port facilities necessary to offload the thousands of men and vehicles and millions of tons of supplies necessary to sustain Operation Overlord. The harbours were made up of all the elements one would expect of any harbour: breakwater, piers and roadways.

== Preparation ==
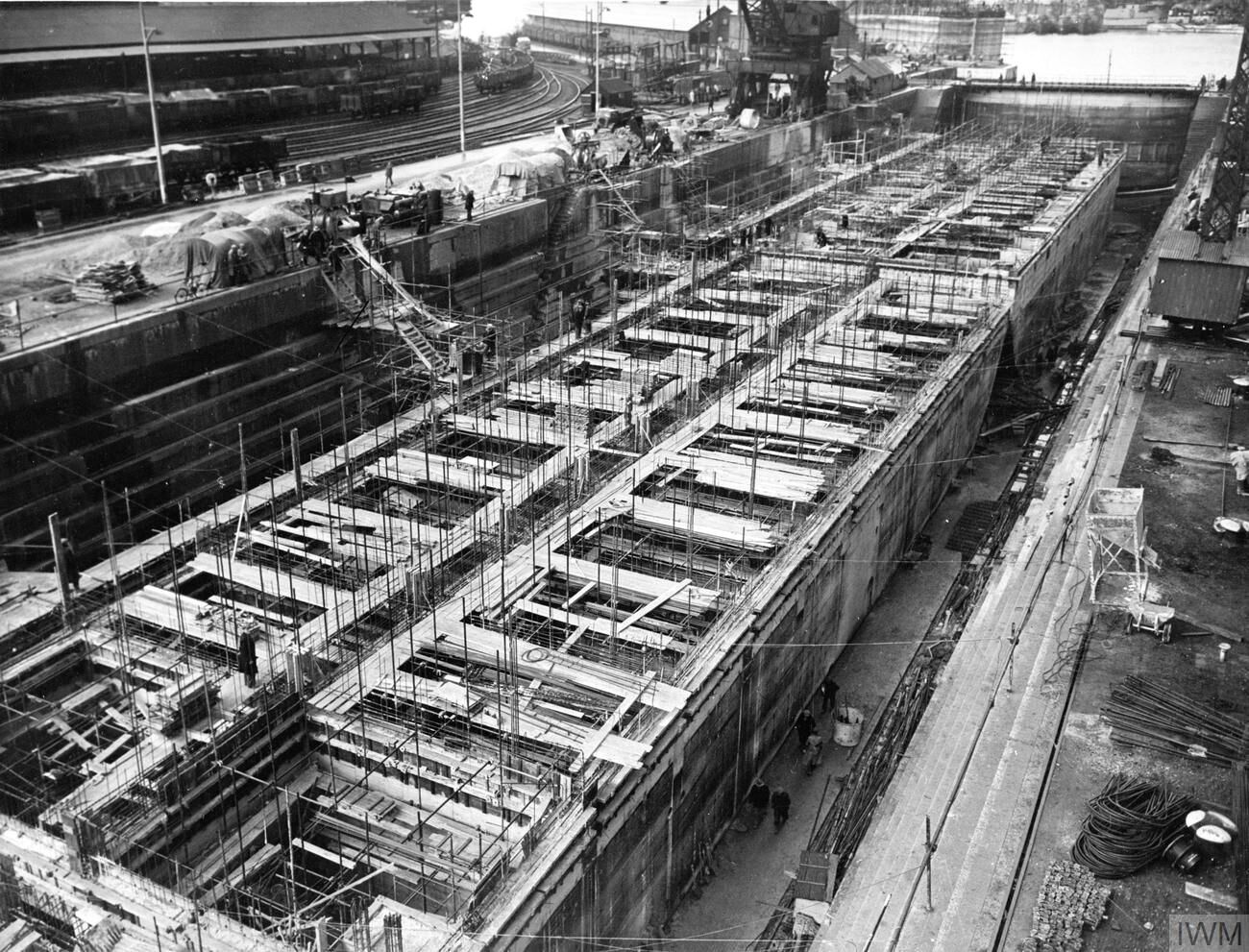
Phoenix caissons under construction in Southampton in 1944

With the planning of Operation Overlord at an advanced stage by the summer of 1943, it was accepted that the proposed artificial harbours would need to be prefabricated in Britain and then towed across the English Channel.

The need for two separate artificial harbours – one American and one British/Canadian – was agreed at the Quebec Conference in August 1943. An Artificial Harbours Sub-Committee was set up under the Chairmanship of the civil engineer Colin R. White, brother of Sir Bruce White, to advise on the location of the harbours and the form of the breakwater; the Sub-Committee's first meeting was held at the Institution of Civil Engineers (ICE) on 4 August 1943. The minutes of the Sub-Committee's meetings show that initially it was envisaged that bubble breakwaters would be used, then blockships were proposed, and finally, because not enough block ships were available, a mix of blockships and purpose-made concrete caisson units were used.

On 2 September 1943 the Combined Chiefs of Staff estimated that the artificial ports (Mulberries) would need to handle 12,000 tons per day, exclusive of motor transport, and in all weathers. On 4 September the go-ahead was given to start work immediately on the harbours. Infighting between the War Office and the Admiralty over responsibility was only resolved on 15 December 1943 by the intervention of the Vice-Chiefs of Staff. The decision was that the Admiralty managed the blockships, bombardons and assembly of all constituent parts on the south coast of England. It would also undertake all necessary work to survey, site, tow and mark navigation. The War Office was given the task of constructing the concrete caissons (phoenixes), the roadways (whales) and protection via anti-aircraft installations. Once at the site, the army was responsible for sinking the caissons and assembling all the various other units of the harbours. For the Mulberry A at Omaha Beach, the US Navy Civil Engineer Corps (CEC) would construct the harbour from prefabricated parts.

The proposed harbours called for many huge caissons of various sorts to build breakwaters and piers and connecting structures to provide the roadways. The caissons were built at a number of locations, mainly existing ship building facilities or large beaches, like Conwy Morfa, around the British coast.

=== Beach surveys ===
Both locations for the temporary harbours required detailed information concerning geology, hydrography and sea conditions. To collect this data a special team of hydrographers was created in October 1943. The 712th Survey Flotilla, operating from naval base HMS Tormentor in Hamble, were detailed to collect soundings off the enemy coast. Between November 1943 and January 1944 this team used a number of specially adapted Landing Craft Personnel (Large), or LCP(L), to survey the Normandy coast.

The LCP(L)s were manned by a Royal Navy crew and a small group of hydrographers. The first sortie, Operation KJF, occurred on the night of 26/27 November 1943 when three LCP(L)s took measurements off the port of Arromanches, the location for Mulberry B. A follow-up mission, Operation KJG, to the proposed location for Mulberry A happened over 1 and 2 December but a navigation failure meant the team sounded an area 2,250 yards west of the correct area.

Two attempts to take soundings were made off Pointe de Ver. The first sortie, Operation Bellpush Able, on 25/26 December had problems with their equipment. They returned on 28/29 December, in Operation Bellpush Baker, to complete the task.

The final Mulberry harbour survey, Operation Bellpush Charlie, occurred on the night of 30–31 January but limited information was gathered due to fog and because German lookouts heard the craft. Further sorties were abandoned.

== Design and development ==
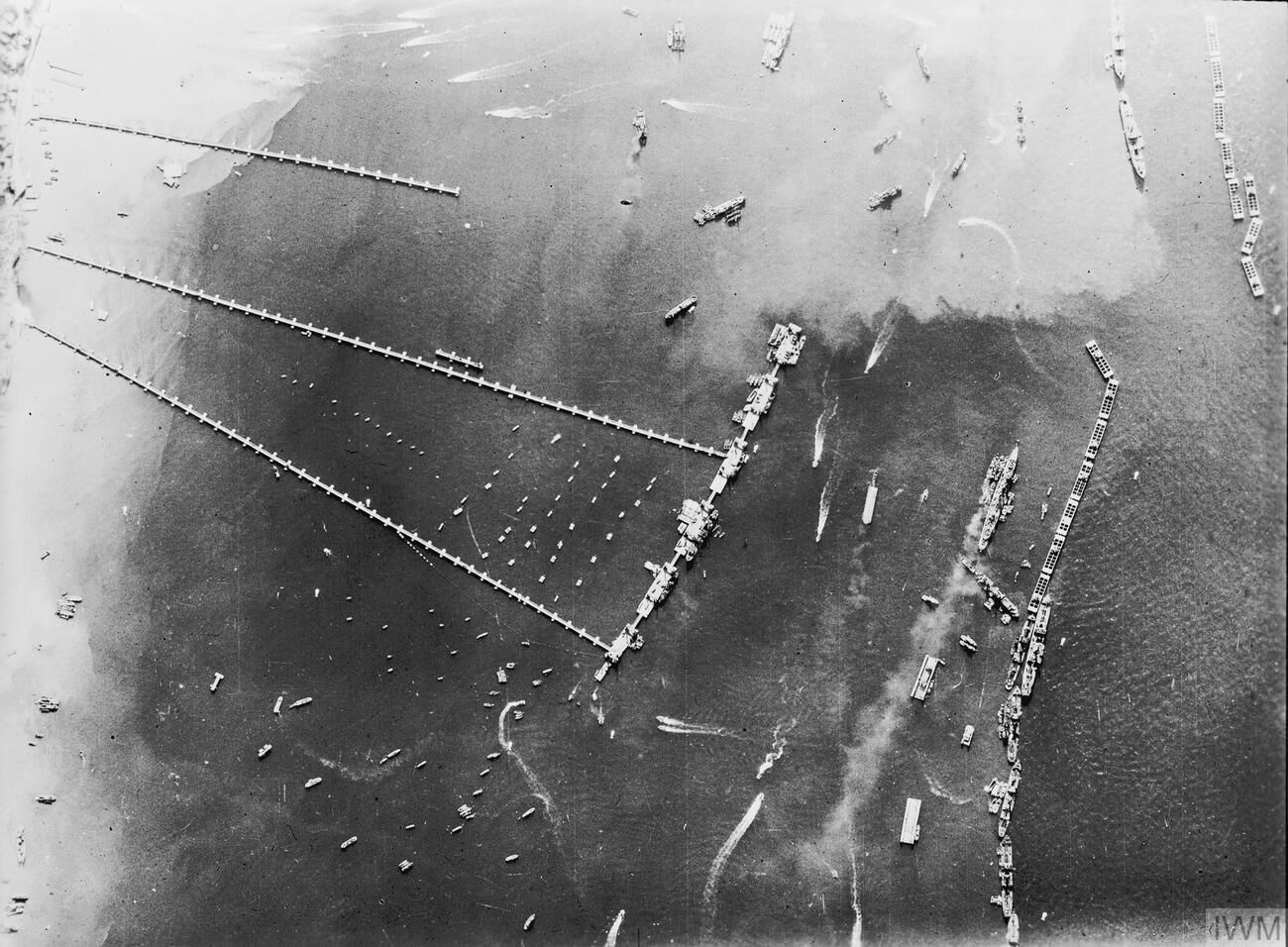
Aerial view of Mulberry harbour "B" at Arromanches-les-Bains in Normandy (October 27, 1944)

An early idea for temporary harbours was sketched by Winston Churchill in a 1915 memo to Lloyd George. This memo was for artificial harbours to be created off the German islands of Borkum and Sylt. No further investigation was made and the memo was filed away.

In 1940 the civil engineer Guy Maunsell wrote to the War Office with a proposal for an artificial harbour, but the idea was not at first adopted. Churchill issued his memo "Piers for use on beaches" on 30 May 1942, apparently in some frustration at the lack of progress being made on finding a solution to the temporary harbour problem. Between 17 June and 6 August 1942, Hugh Iorys Hughes submitted a design concept for artificial harbours to the War Office.

At a meeting following the Dieppe Raid of 19 August 1942, Vice-Admiral John Hughes-Hallett (the naval commander for the Dieppe Raid) declared that if a port could not be captured, then one should be taken across the Channel. Hughes-Hallett had the support of Churchill. The concept of Mulberry harbours began to take shape when Hughes-Hallett moved to be Naval Chief of Staff to the Overlord planners.

In the autumn of 1942, the Chief of Combined Operations Vice-Admiral Lord Louis Mountbatten, outlined the requirement for piers at least one mile (1.6 km) long at which a continuous stream of supplies could be handled, including a pier head capable of handling 2,000-ton ships.

In July 1943 a committee of eminent civil engineers consisting of Colin R White (chairman), J D C Couper, J A Cochrane, R D Gwyther and Lt. Col. Ivor Bell was established to advise on how a number of selected sites on the French coastline could be converted into sheltered harbours. The committee initially investigated the use of compressed air breakwaters before eventually deciding on blockships and caissons.

Churchill discussed the Mulberry harbour idea with President Roosevelt. The Secretary of Labor, Frances Perkins, recorded Roosevelt's comments, "You know that was Churchill's idea. He has a hundred a day and about four of them are good"

=== Trials ===
In August and September 1943 a trial of three competing designs for the cargo-handling jetties was set up together with a test of a compressed air breakwater. The pier designs were by:

- Hugh Iorys Hughes (a civil engineer) who developed his "Hippo" piers and "Crocodile" bridge spans;
- Ronald Hamilton (working at the Department of Miscellaneous Weapons Development) who devised the "Swiss roll" which consisted of a floating roadway made of waterproofed canvas stiffened with slats and tensioned by cables;
- Lieutenant Colonel William T Everall and Major Allan Beckett (of the War Office's 'Transportation 5 Department' (Tn5)) who designed a floating bridge linked to a pier head (the latter had integral 'spud' legs that were raised and lowered with the tide).

The western side of Wigtown Bay, in the Solway Firth, was selected for the trials as the tides were similar to those on the expected invasion beaches in Normandy, a harbour was available at Garlieston, and the area's remoteness would simplify security matters. A headquarters camp was erected at Cairn Head, about 5 miles (8.0 km) south of Garlieston. Prototypes of each of the designs were built and transported to the area for testing by Royal Engineers, based at Cairn Head and in Garlieston. The tests revealed various problems (the "Swiss roll" would only take up to a seven-ton truck in the Atlantic swell). The final choice of design was determined by a storm during which the "Hippos" were undermined causing the "Crocodile" bridge spans to fail and the Swiss roll was washed away. Tn5's design proved the most successful and Beckett's floating roadway (subsequently codenamed whale) survived undamaged; the design was adopted and 16 km (10 mi) of whale roadway were manufactured under the management of J. D. Bernal and Brigadier Bruce White, the Director of Ports and Inland Water Transport at the War Office. The chosen design was based on a Lobnitz Dredger preform. The design was approved after 13 months of testing.

== Construction and deployment ==
The works were let out to commercial construction firms, including Edmund Nuttall, Wates Construction, Balfour Beatty, Henry Boot, Bovis & Co, Cochrane & Sons, Costain, Cubitts, French, Holloway Brothers, John Laing & Son, Peter Lind & Company, Sir Robert McAlpine, Melville Dundas & Whitson, Mowlem, Parkinson, Halcrow Group, Pauling & Co. and Taylor Woodrow. In the spring of 1944, around 37,000 workers secretly employed across Britain began manufacturing components for the harbours. On completion, these components were towed to locations on the south coast where they were sunk off shore in readiness for D-Day. Just before D-Day they were refloated and towed across the English Channel by tugboats to the Normandy coast at only 8.0 kilometres per hour (4.3 kn) and assembled, operated and maintained by the Corps of Royal Engineers, under the guidance of Reginald D. Gwyther, who was appointed CBE for his efforts. Various elements of the whale piers were designed and constructed by a group of companies led by Braithwaite & Co, West Bromwich and Newport.

== Elements ==
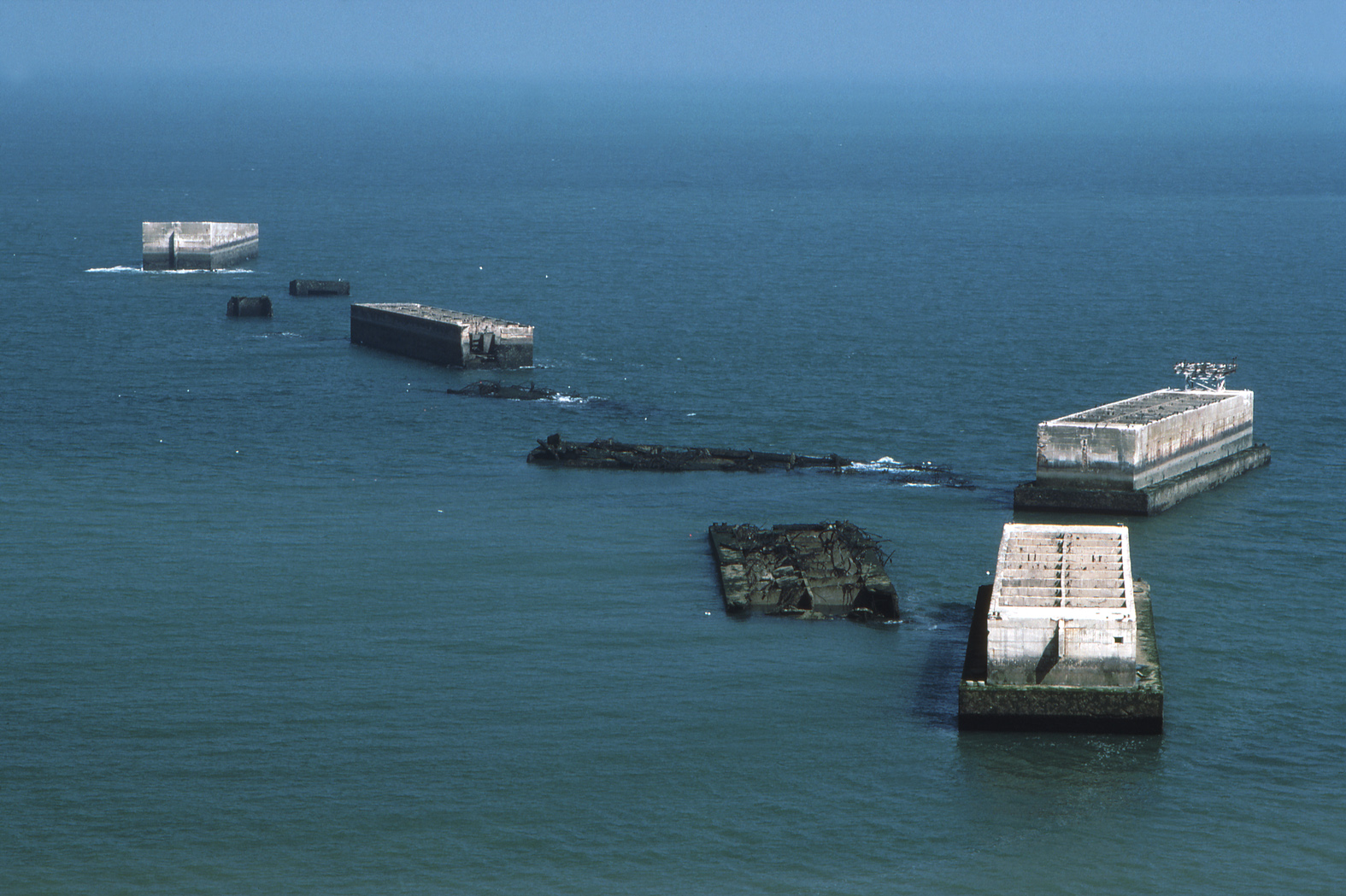
The remains of the harbour off Arromanches in 1990

Mulberry was the codename for all the various structures that created the artificial harbours. These were called gooseberries, which metamorphosed into fully fledged harbours. Mulberry "A" and "B" each consisted of a floating outer breakwater called a bombardons, a static breakwater consisting of "corncobs" and reinforced concrete caissons called phoenix breakwaters, floating piers or roadways codenamed whales and beetles and pier heads codenamed spuds. These harbours when built were both of a similar size to Dover harbour. In the planning of Operation Neptune the term Mulberry "B" was defined as "an artificial harbour to be built in England and towed to the British beaches at Arromanches".

The Mulberry harbour assembled on Omaha Beach at Saint-Laurent-sur-Mer was for use by the American invasion forces. Mulberry "A" (American) was not as securely anchored to the sea bed as Mulberry "B" had been by the British, resulting in such severe damage during the Channel storm of June 19, 1944 that it was considered to be irreparable and its further assembly ceased, It was commanded by Augustus Dayton Clark.

Mulberry "B" (British) was the harbour assembled on Gold Beach at Arromanches for use by the British and Canadian invasion forces. The harbour was decommissioned six months after D-Day, when Allied forces could use the recently captured port of Antwerp to offload troops and supplies. Mulberry "B" was operated by 20 Port Group, Royal Engineers, under the command of Lieutenant Colonel G.C.B. Shaddick.

=== Breakwaters ===
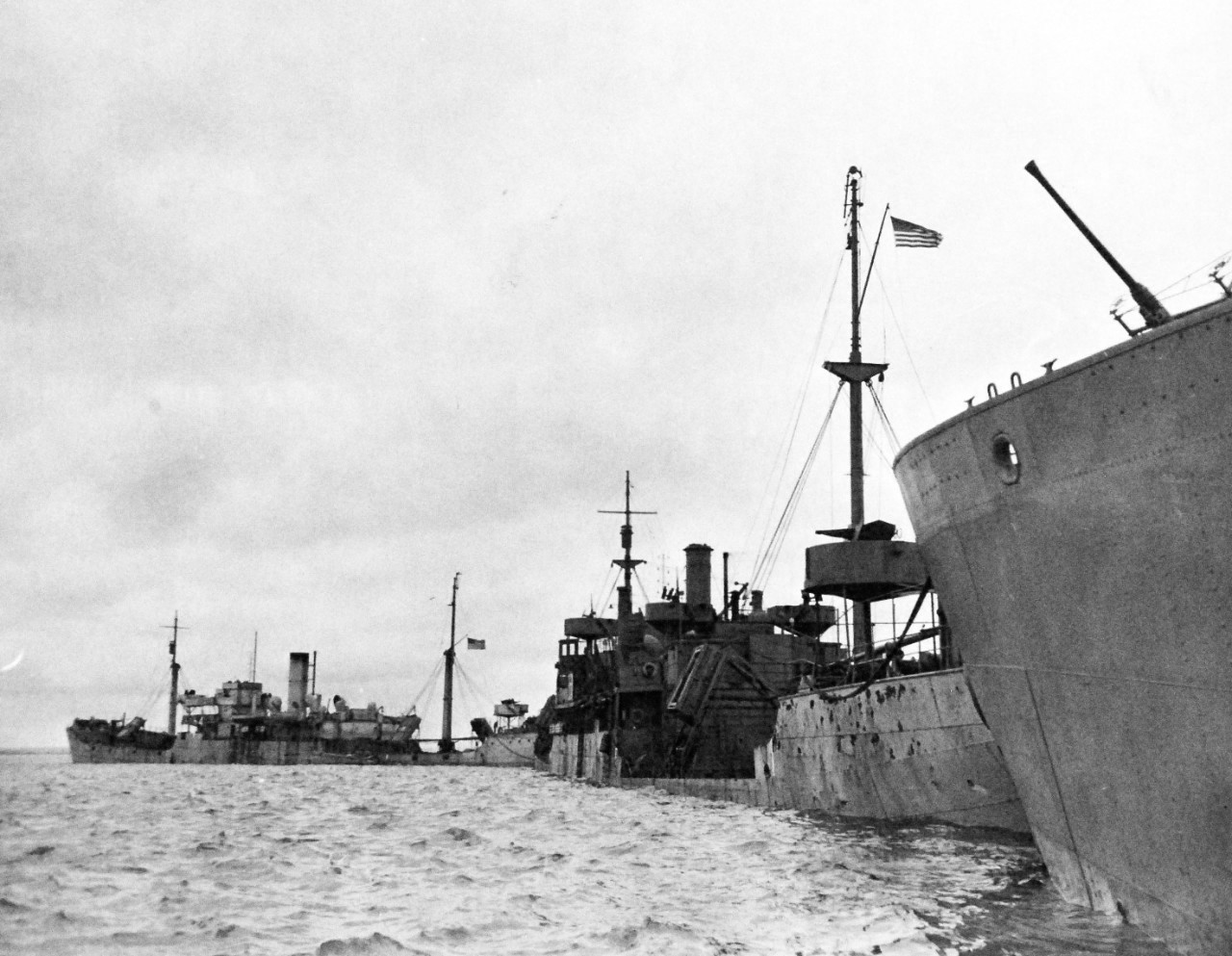
Gooseberry line of ships used as artificial harbour breakwater in June 1944

==== Corncobs and gooseberries ====
Corncobs were 61 ships that crossed the English Channel (either under their own steam or towed) and were then scuttled to act as breakwaters and create sheltered water at the five landing beaches. Once in position the corncobs created the sheltered waters known as gooseberries.

The ships used for each beach were:

- Utah Beach (Gooseberry 1, 10 ships): Benjamin Contee, David O. Saylor, George S. Wasson, Matt W. Ransom, West Cheswald, West Honaker, West Nohno, Willis A. Slater, Victory Sword and Vitruvius.
- Omaha Beach (Gooseberry 2, 15 ships): Artemas Ward, Audacious, Baialoide, HMS Centurion, Courageous, Flight-Command, Galveston, George W. Childs, James W. Marshall, James Iredell Illinoian, Olambala, Potter, West Grama and Wilscox.
- Gold Beach (Gooseberry 3, 16 ships): Alynbank, Alghios Spyridon, Elswick Park, Flowergate, Giorgios P., Ingman, Innerton, Lynghaug, Modlin, Njegos, Parkhaven, Parklaan, Saltersgate, Sirehei, Vinlake and Winha.
- Juno Beach (Gooseberry 4, 11 ships): Belgique, Bendoran, Empire Bunting, Empire Flamingo, Empire Moorhen, Empire Waterhen, Formigny, Manchester Spinner, Mariposa, Panos and Vera Radcliffe.
- Sword Beach (Gooseberry 5, 9 ships ): Becheville, French battleship Courbet, Dover Hill, HMS Durban, Empire Defiance, Empire Tamar, Empire Tana, Forbin and HNLMS Sumatra.

==== Phoenix caissons ====
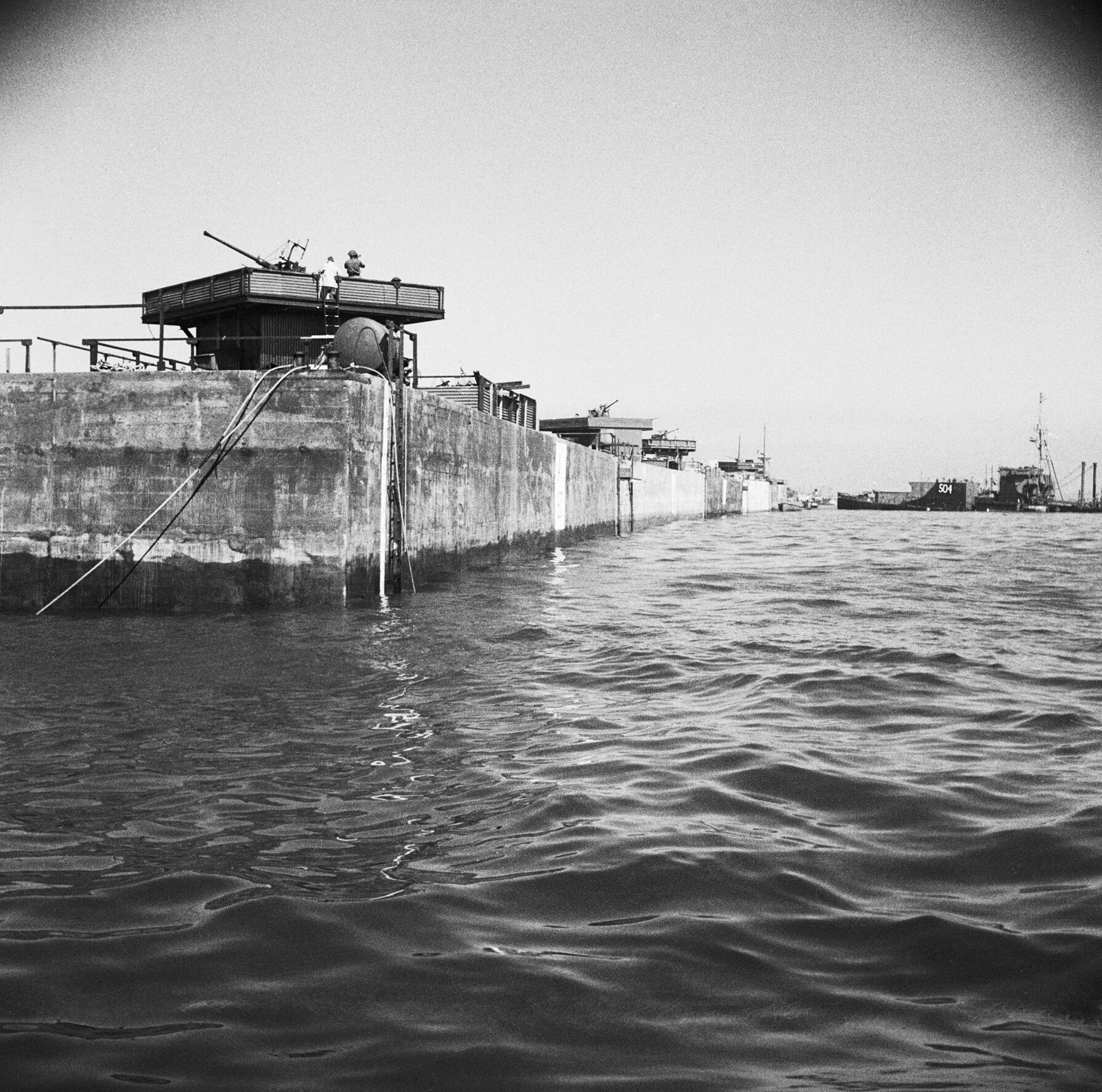
A line of Phoenix caissons in place at Arromanches, with anti-aircraft guns installed. 12 June 1944

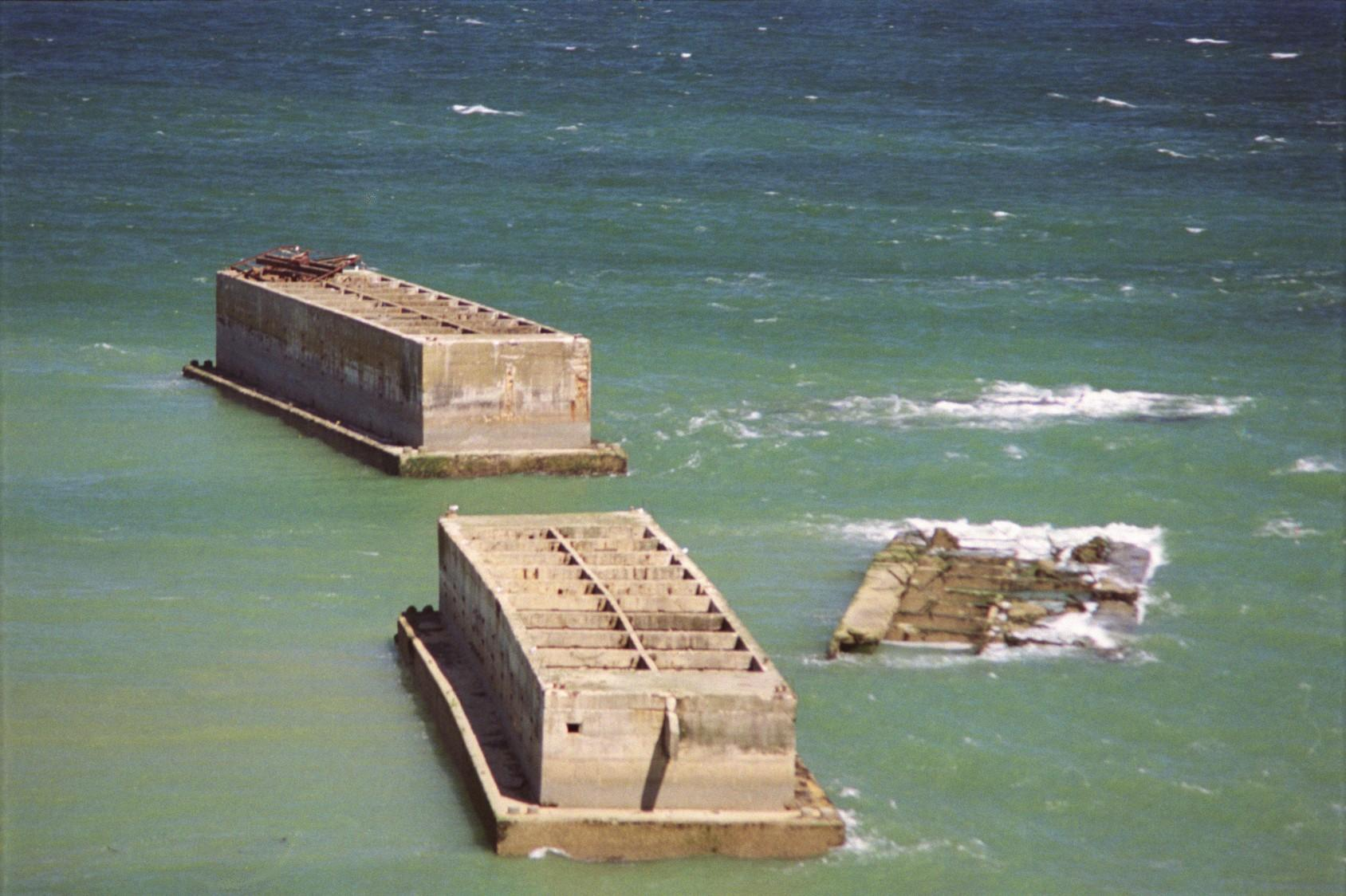
A pair of surviving Phoenixes, and the remains of a third, at Arromanches, 2010

Phoenixes were reinforced concrete caissons constructed by civil engineering contractors around the coast of Britain, collected and sunk at Dungeness in Kent and Pagham Harbour in West Sussex prior to D-Day. There were six different sizes of caisson (with displacements of approximately 2,000 tons to 6,000 tons each) and each unit was towed to Normandy by two tugs at around three knots. The caissons were initially planned to be moored along the coast, but due to a lack of mooring capacity they were sunk awaiting D-Day, and then refloated ("resurrected", hence the name).

The Royal Engineers were responsible for the task, and questions had arisen about whether their plans were adequate. US Navy Captain (later Rear Admiral) Edward Ellsberg, a known expert in marine salvage, was brought in to review the plans and determined that they were not. The supplied pumps were designed for moving large volumes of sewage horizontally, and were incapable of providing the necessary lift to pump the water up and out of the caissons.

Ellsberg's report resulted in Churchill's intervention, taking the task away from the Royal Engineers and giving it to the Royal Navy. Newly appointed commodore Sinclair McKenzie was put in charge and quickly assembled every salvage barge in the British Isles. The phoenixes, once refloated, were towed across the channel to form the "Mulberry" harbour breakwaters together with the gooseberry block ships. Ellsberg rode one of the concrete caissons to Normandy; once there he helped unsnarl wrecked landing craft and vehicles on the beach.

==== Bombardons ====
The bombardons were large 200 ft (61 m) by 25 ft (7.6 m) plus-shaped floating breakwaters fabricated in steel and rubberized canvas that were anchored outside the main breakwaters that consisted of gooseberries (scuttled ships) and phoenixes (concrete caissons. Twenty-four bombardon units, attached to one another with hemp ropes, created 1 mi (1.6 km) breakwaters. During the storms at the end of June 1944. some broke up and sank while others parted their anchors and drifted down onto the harbours, possibly causing more damage than the storm itself. Their design was the responsibility of the Royal Navy; the Royal Engineers designed the rest of the Mulberry harbour equipment.

=== Roadways ===
==== Whales ====
A Whale floating roadway leading to a Spud pier at Mulberry A off Omaha Beach

The dock piers were codenamed whales. They were the floating roadways that connected the "spud" pier heads to the land. Designed by Allan Beckett, the roadways were made from innovative torsionally flexible bridging units that had a span of 80 feet (24 m), mounted on pontoon units of either steel or concrete called "beetles". After the war many of the "Whale" bridge spans from Arromanches were used to repair bombed bridges in France, Belgium and the Netherlands. Such units are still visible as a bridge over the Noireau river in Normandy, Meuse River in Vacherauville (Meuse), as a bridge over the Moselle River on road D56 between Cattenom and Kœnigsmacker (Moselle) and in Vierville-sur-Mer (Calvados) along road D517. In 1954, some whales were also used to build two bridges (still visible) in Cameroon along the Edea to Kribi road. In the 1960s, three whale spans from Arromanches were used at Ford Dagenham for cars to drive from the assembly line directly onto ships. A span from Mulberry B reused after the war at Pont-Farcy was saved from destruction in 2008 by Les Amis du Pont Bailey, a group of English and French volunteers. Seeking a permanent home for it, they gifted it to the Imperial War Museum and it was returned to England in July 2015. After conservation work it is now part of the Land Warfare exhibition at Imperial War Museum Duxford.

==== Beetles ====
Beetles were pontoons that supported the Whale piers. War work by the Butterley Company included the production of steel "pontoons used to support the floating bridge between the offshore Mulberry Harbour caissons and the shore on Gold and Omaha beaches after D-Day 1944". Roy Christian wrote: "The workers who made mysterious floats had no idea of their ultimate purpose until one morning in June 1944 they realised that their products were helping to support the Mulberry Harbour off the low coastline of Normandy, and by that time they were busy building pontoon units and Bailey bridge panels ready for the breakthrough into Germany. But if they were often in the dark about the purpose and destination of the products over which they toiled for days in workshop, forge and foundry, they understood their importance. No time was lost through the war years on strikes or disputes, and absenteeism was low. Some of those workers were women, for in the first time in its history female labour was being employed at the Butterley works." 420 concrete pontoons were made by Wates Ltd. at their Barrow in Furness, West India Docks, Marchwood and Beaulieu sites. A further 40 concrete beetles were made by John Laing (for Wates) at their Southsea factory and 20 were made at R. Costain at Erith, Twelve were made by John Mowlem at Russia Dock as were 8 by Melville Dundas and Whiston. They were moored in position using wires attached to "Kite" anchors which were also designed by Allan Beckett. These anchors had such high holding power that few could be recovered at the end of the war. The Navy was dismissive of Beckett's claims for his anchor's holding ability so Kite anchors were not used for mooring the bombardons. An original Kite anchor is displayed in a private museum at Vierville-sur-Mer while a full size replica forms part of a memorial to Beckett in Arromanches. In October 2018, five Kite anchors were recovered from the bed of the Solent off Woodside Beach, which had been an assembly area for Whale tows prior to D-Day. The anchors were taken to Mary Rose Archaeological Services in Portsmouth for conservation treatment.

=== Spuds ===
The pier heads or landing wharves at which ships were unloaded were codenamed spuds. Each consisted of a pontoon with four legs that rested on the sea bed to anchor it while it could float up and down freely with the tide.

== Deployment ==
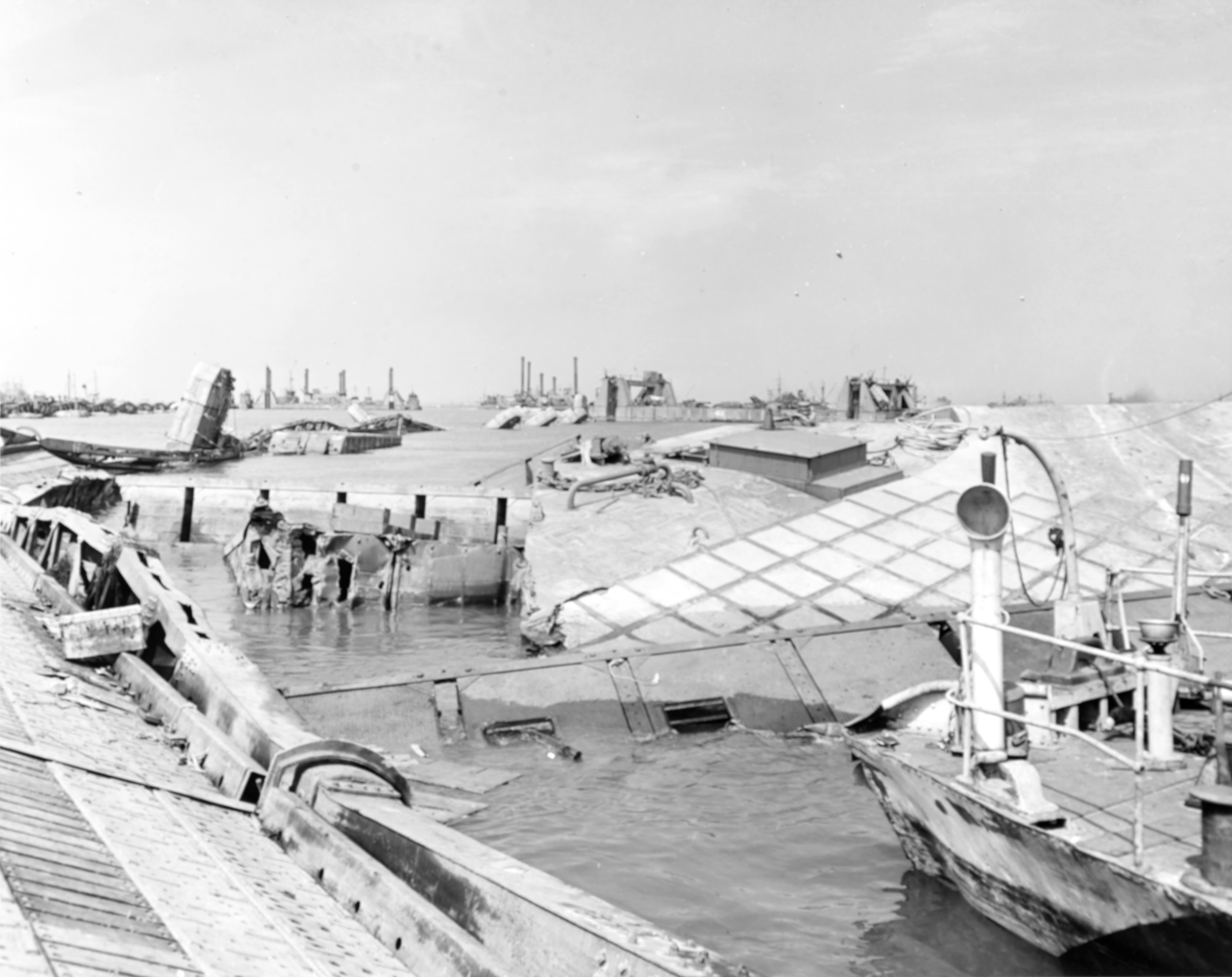
Wrecked pontoon causeway of Mulberry A following the storm of 19–22 June 1944

Components for the Mulberry harbours were constructed at many different locations in Britain, before being transferred to assembly points off the south coast. Then on the afternoon of 6 June 1944 (D-Day) over 400 towed component parts (weighing approximately 1.5 million tons) set sail to create the two Mulberry harbours. It included all the blockships (codenamed Corncobs) to create the outer breakwater (gooseberries) and 146 concrete caissons (phoenixes).

=== Arromanches ===
At Arromanches, the first phoenix was sunk at dawn on 8 June 1944. By 15 June a further 115 had been sunk to create a five-mile-long arc between Tracy-sur-Mer in the west to Asnelles in the east. To protect the new anchorage, the superstructures of the blockships (which remained above sea-level) and the concrete caissons were festooned with anti-aircraft guns and barrage balloons manned by the men of the 397th and 481st Anti-Aircraft Artillery (Automatic Weapons) Battalions, attached to the First US Army.

=== Omaha ===
Arriving first on D-Day were the bombardons, followed a day later by the first blockship. The first phoenix was sunk on 9 June and the gooseberry was finished by 11 June. By 18 June two piers and four pier heads were working. Though this harbour was abandoned in late June (see below), the beach continued to be used for landing vehicles and stores using Landing Ship Tanks (LSTs). Using this method, the Americans were able to unload a higher tonnage of supplies than at Arromanches. Salvageable parts of the artificial port were sent to Arromanches to repair the Mulberry there.

=== Storm ===
Both harbours were almost fully functional when on 19 June a nor'easter of force 6 to 8 blew into Normandy and devastated the Mulberry harbour at Omaha Beach. The harbours had been designed with summer weather conditions in mind, but this was the worst storm to hit the Normandy coast in 40 years.

The entire harbour at Omaha was deemed irreparable, 21 of the 28 phoenix caissons were completely destroyed, the bombardons were cast adrift and the roadways and piers lay smashed.

The Mulberry harbour at Arromanches was more protected, and although damaged by the storm, it remained usable. It came to be known as Port Winston. While the harbour at Omaha was destroyed sooner than expected, Port Winston saw heavy use for eight months, despite being designed to last only three months. In the ten months after D-Day, it was used to land almost three million men, four million tons of supplies and half a million vehicles to reinforce France. In response to this longer-than-planned use, the phoenix breakwater was reinforced with the addition of specially strengthened caissons. The Royal Engineers had built a complete Mulberry Harbour out of 600,000 tons of concrete between 33 jetties, and had 10 mi (16 km) of floating roadways to land men and vehicles on the beach. Port Winston is commonly upheld as one of the best examples of military engineering. Its remains are still visible today from the beaches at Arromanches.

== Post-war analysis ==
Although it was a success, the vast resources used on the Mulberry may have been wasted, as the American forces were supplied mostly over the beaches without the use of a Mulberry right through to September 1944. By the end of 6 June, 20,000 troops and 1,700 vehicles had landed on Utah beach (the shortest beach). At Omaha and Utah, 6,614 tons of cargo were discharged in the first three days. A month after D-Day, Omaha and Utah were handling 9,200 tons, and after a further month, they were landing 16,000 tons per day. This increased until 56,200 tons of supplies, 20,000 vehicles, and 180,000 troops were discharged each day at those beaches. The Mulberry harbours provided less than half the total (on good weather days) to begin with. The Normandy beaches supplied the following average daily tonnage of supplies:

Average Daily Tonnage of Supplies Landed, Normandy 1944
Day Beach/Port	D+30	D+60
Mulberry	6,750	6,750
Omaha	1,200	10,000
Isigny	500	1,300
Grandcamp	500	900
Utah	8,000	6,000
total beaches	9,200	16,000

By the end of June, over 289,827 tons of supplies had been offloaded onto the Normandy beaches. Up to September, U.S. forces were supported largely across the beaches, primarily without the use of the Mulberry. "However, in the critical early stage of the operation, had the Allied assault ships been caught in the open without the benefit of any protection, the damage in the American sector especially could have been catastrophic to the lines of supply and communication."

Mulberry B was substantially reinforced with units salvaged from the American harbour and that the Phoenixes were pumped full of sand to give them greater stability, measures that undoubtedly explain the extended service which the British port was able to render. Furthermore, the planners obviously underrated the capacities of open beaches. The tremendous tonnage capacities subsequently developed at both Utah and Omaha were without doubt one of the most significant and gratifying features of the entire Overlord operation.

== Surviving remnants in the UK ==
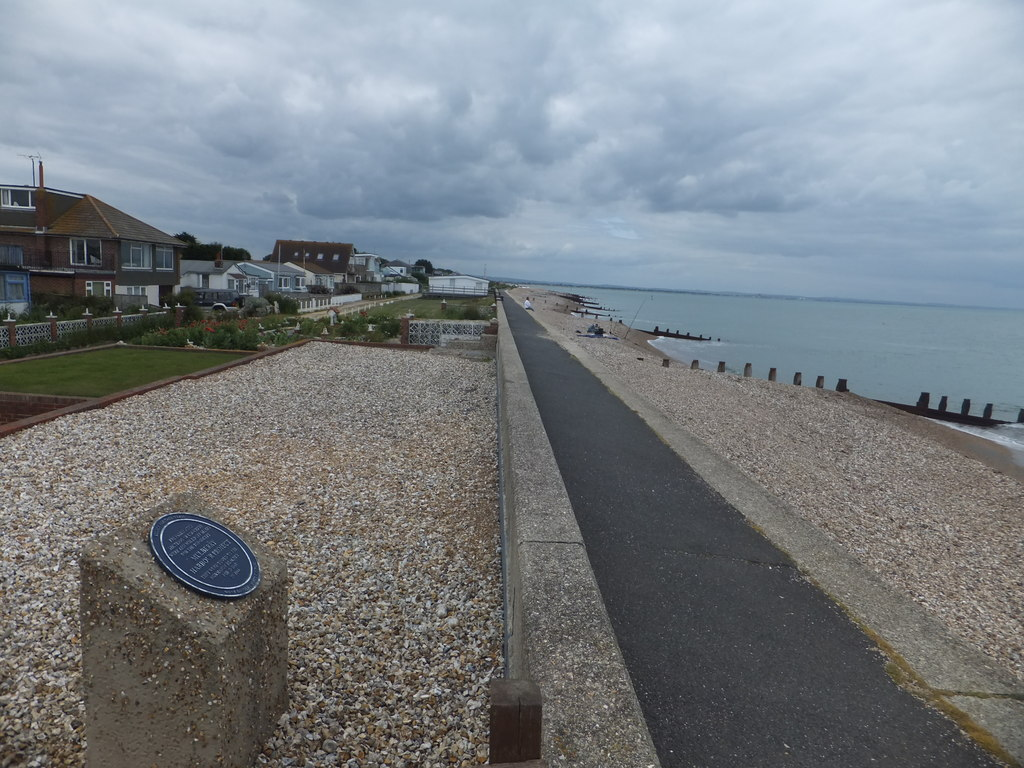
Pagham Harbour from East Beach, Selsey. The blue plaque commemorates the construction at Selsey of Mulberry harbour sections for D-Day.

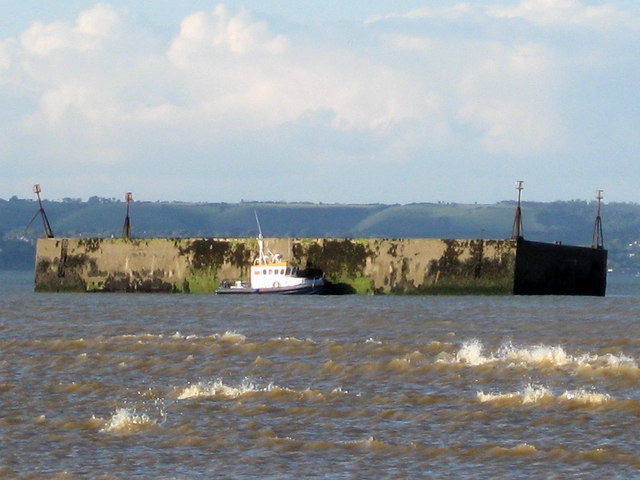
Littlestone-on-Sea, Kent Phoenix caisson

Sections of Phoenix caissons are located at:

- Thorpe Bay, Southend-on-Sea – while being towed from Immingham to Southsea, the caisson began to leak and was intentionally beached on a sandbank in the Thames Estuary. It was designated as a scheduled monument in 2004. It is accessible at low tide.
- Pagham Harbour, West Sussex – 0.5 miles (0.80 km) south-east of Pagham a Phoenix Caisson, known as the 'Near Mulberry', that sank and could not be re-floated is still visible at low tide. Further off the coast in 10 m (33 ft) of water, is a second Phoenix Caisson, known as the 'Far Mulberry', that broke its back and sank in the storm the night before D-Day. Both sections were scheduled in 2019.
- Littlestone-on-Sea, Kent – caisson could not be refloated. The site was scheduled in 2013.
- Langstone Harbour, Hayling Island – faulty caisson left in-situ at place of construction.
- Littlehampton – caissons about five metres underwater and dived by novice divers.
- Portland Harbour, Portland, Dorset – two are located at the beach at Castletown. They were designated as a Grade II listed building in 1993.

Beetles are located at:

- Bognor Regis, on the shore line West of Marine Drive, Aldwick, where it washed up a few days after D-Day. Easily accessible at low tide
- Garlieston, Wigtownshire – concrete beetle remains are accessible on foot on the north side of Garlieston Bay (Eggerness) and at Cairn Head on the south side of Portyerrock Bay on the road to Isle of Whithorn.

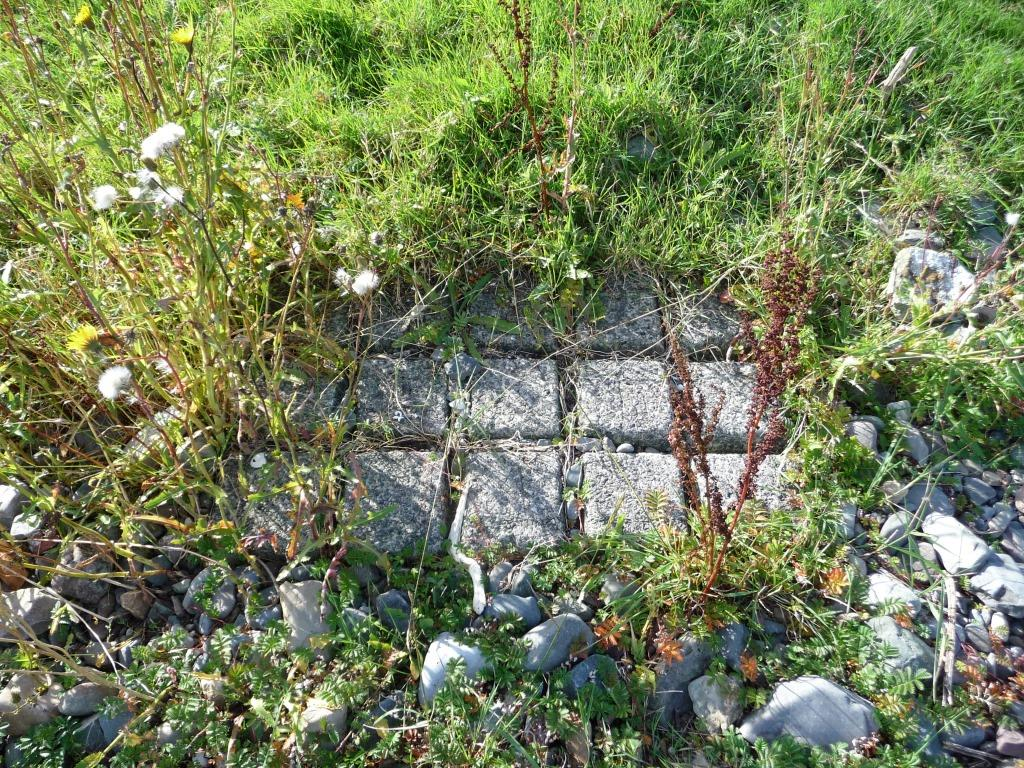
Prototype concrete Mulberry Harbour roadway 'Hard', photographed at Cairn Head on 31 August 2013

- Old House Point, Cairnryan, Dumfries and Galloway, three beetles at the shore line.
- 39 beetles located on the foreshore between Hythe and Marchwood.

Other artefacts around Garlieston include:

- a conspicuous stone wall at the back of Rigg Bay beach: this was the landward terminal for a "Crocodile" link to a "Hippo"
- the remains of a collapsed "Hippo" visible at low tide in Rigg Bay
- a number of abandoned brick buildings, once the camp at Cairn Head
- some lengths of concrete roadway on the beach at Cairn Head, intended for use with "Swiss roll".

At Southampton, Town Quay, a short section of whale roadway and a buffer pontoon, now derelict, used after the war for Isle of Wight ferries, survive between the Royal Pier and the Town Quay car ferry terminal. In 2025 it was removed from the area with a plan to relocate it to Marchwood.

== German equivalent of Mulberry ==
In the period between postponement and cancellation of Operation Sea Lion, the invasion of the United Kingdom, Germany developed some prototype prefabricated jetties with a similar purpose in mind. These could be seen in Alderney, until they were demolished in 1978.

== Daily Telegraph crosswords ==
"Mulberry" and the names of all the beaches were words appearing in the Daily Telegraph crossword puzzle in the month prior to the invasion. The crossword compilers, Melville Jones and Leonard Dawe, were questioned by MI5, which determined the appearance of the words was innocent. Over 60 years later, a former student reported that Dawe frequently requested words from his students, many of whom were children in the same area as US military personnel.

== See also ==
- Operation Pluto
- Lily: a floating airstrip using components developed for the Mulberry harbour
- PLA Navy landing barges – a water bridge (水桥 Shuiqiao) forming a pier for amphibious landing
