= Contee =

Contee may refer to:

- "Conteé", a poem from the 1978 book Babel by Patti Smith
- Benjamin Contee (1755–1815), American Episcopal priest and statesman
- Cheryl Contee, American entrepreneur, CEO, blogger, and writer
- Thomas Contee (1729–1811), American militia man, politician, planter

== See also ==
- SS Benjamin Contee, 1942 American Liberty Ship
