= SS Benjamin Contee =

World War II Liberty ship of the United States

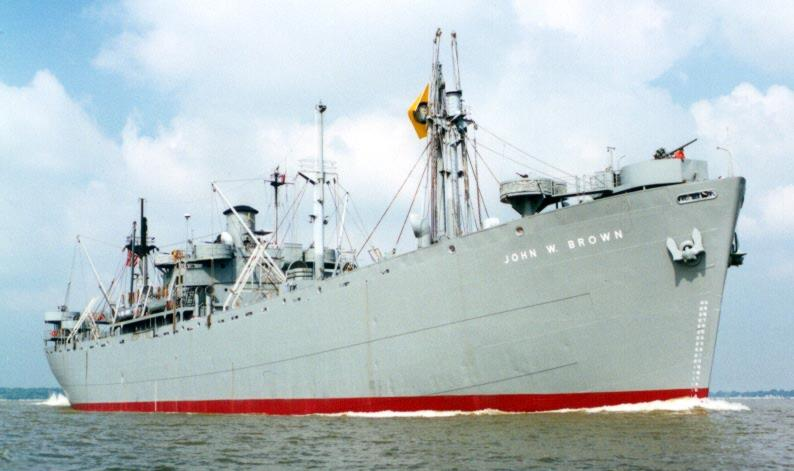
- Benjamin Contee was a standard liberty ship, similar to SS John W. Brown, seen here.

History

United States
- Name: Benjamin Contee
- Namesake: Benjamin Contee
- Builder: Delta Shipbuilding Company, New Orleans
- Yard number: 153
- Way number: 2
- Laid down: February 2, 1942
- Launched: June 15, 1942
- Completed: August 7, 1942
- Fate: Abandoned at Normandy June 16, 1944

General characteristics
- Class & type: Type EC2-S-C1 Liberty ship
- Displacement: 14,245 long tons (14,474 t)
- Length: 441 ft 6 in (134.57 m) o/a; 417 ft 9 in (127.33 m) p/p; 427 ft (130 m) w/l
- Beam: 57 ft (17 m)
- Draft: 27 ft 9 in (8.46 m)
- Propulsion: Two oil-fired boilers; Triple-expansion steam engine; 2,500 hp (1,900 kW); Single screw
- Speed: 11 knots (20 km/h; 13 mph)
- Range: 20,000 nmi (37,000 km; 23,000 mi)
- Capacity: 10,856 t (10,685 long tons) deadweight (DWT)
- Crew: 81
- Armament: Stern-mounted 4 in (100 mm) deck gun for use against surfaced submarines, variety of anti-aircraft guns

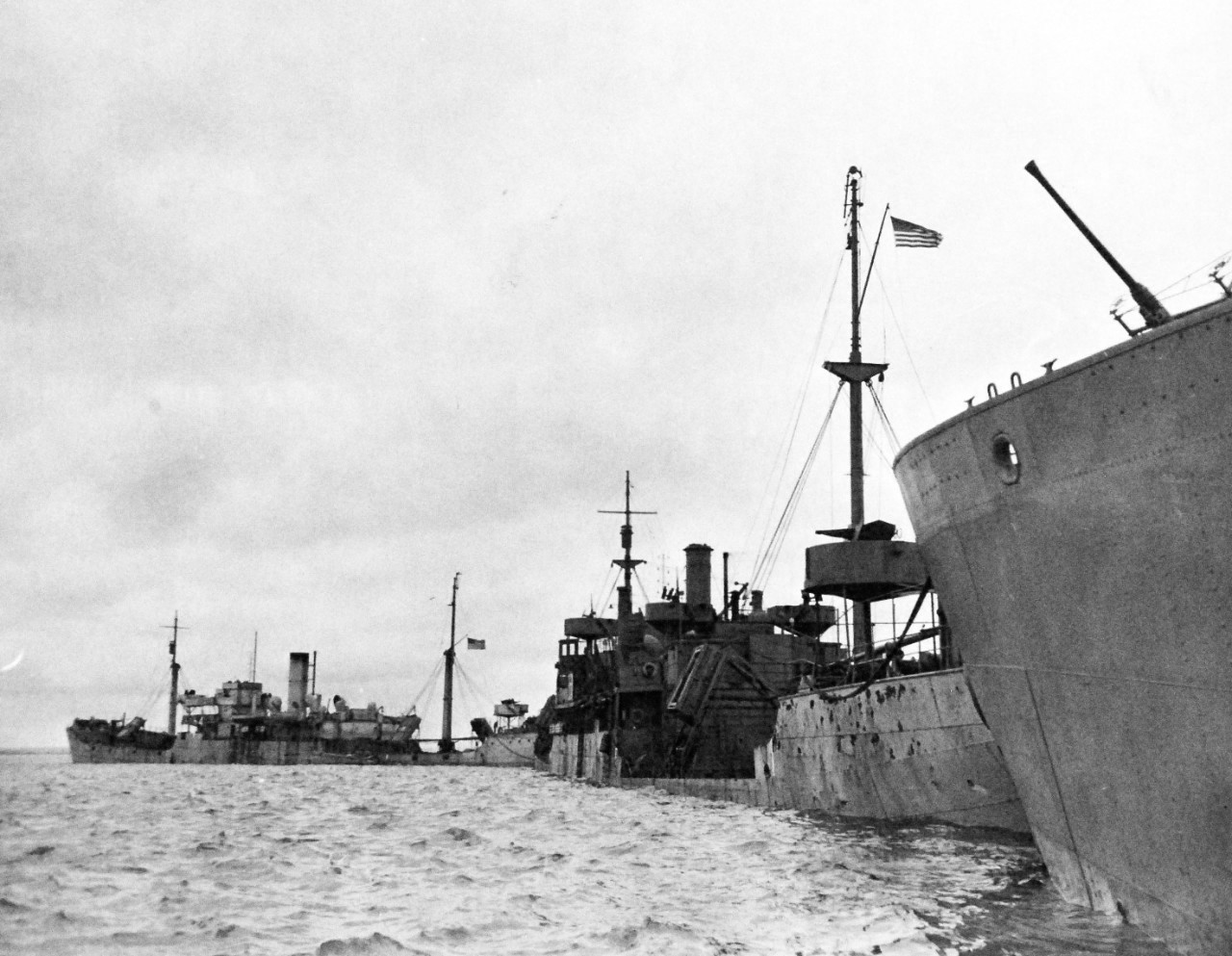
Gooseberry line of ship used as artificial harbour breakwater in June 1944

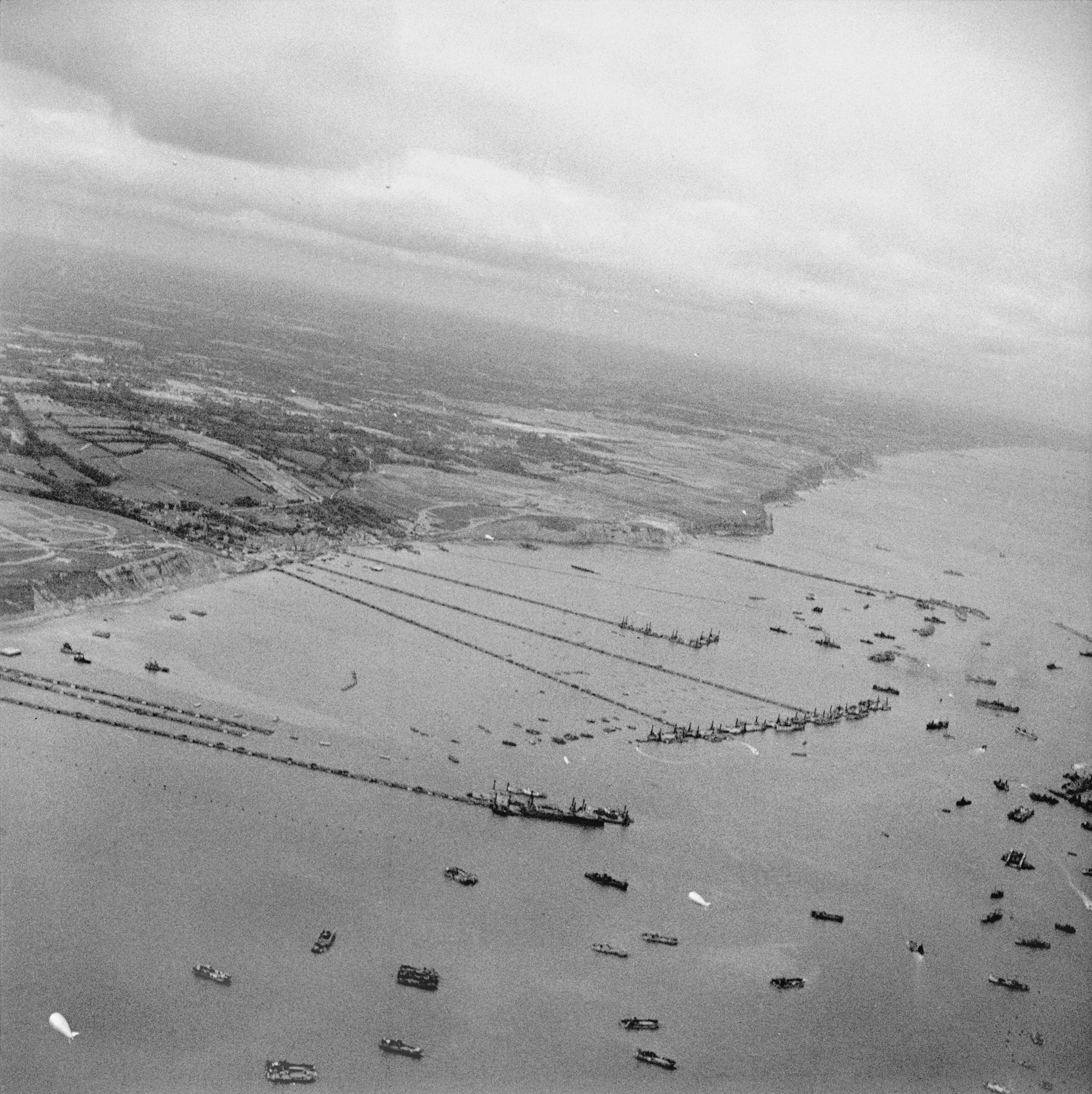
Mulberry artificial harbour in Normandy in September 1944, SS Benjamin Contee was used to block the incoming waves

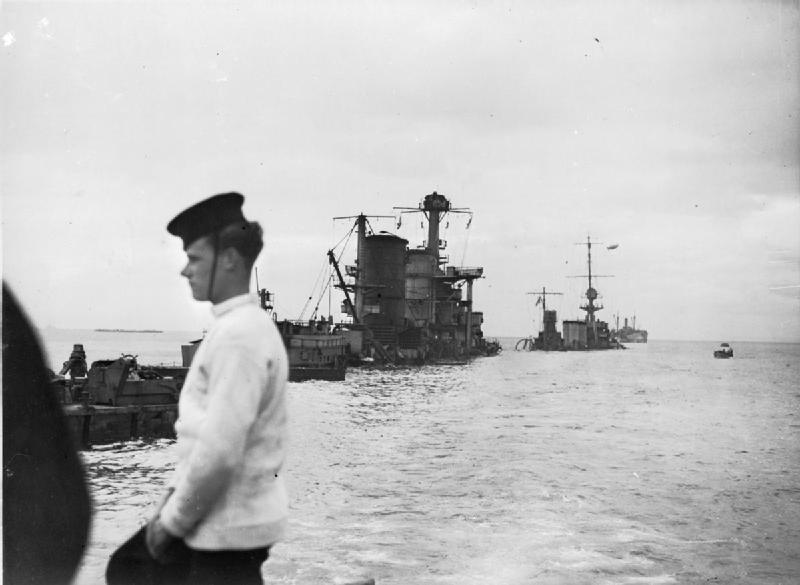
A view of the "gooseberry" breakwater, showing the partially submerged ships

SS Benjamin Contee was an American Liberty Ship type EC2-S-C1 built in 1942 by the Delta Shipbuilding in New Orleans, Louisiana as part of the Emergency Shipbuilding Program for World War II. She was laid down on February 2, 1942, launched on June 15, 1942, and completed on August 7, 1942. She was operated by the Mississippi Shipping Company for the War Shipping Administration as a United States Merchant Marine ship. She was a Maritime Commission design. Like other Liberty ships, she was 441 feet (134 m) long and 56 feet (17 m) wide, carried 9000 tons of cargo and had a top speed of 11 knots (20 km/h). Most Liberty ships were named after prominent deceased Americans. She was converted from a cargo ship to a troop transport ship. She is named after Benjamin Contee, an American Episcopal priest and statesman from Maryland. He was an officer in the American Revolutionary War, a delegate to the Confederation Congress, and a member of the first United States House of Representatives.

== World War II ==
Benjamin Contee took part in convoy ON 187, a Liverpool - Halifax, Nova Scotia trip. The Convoy departed on June 1, 1943, and arrived at New York on June 15. To support Britain, the ship operated under the Combined Shipping Adjustment Board. At the request of Britain, the Benjamin Contee was used to transport Italian prisoners of War from El Alamein, Egypt to Oran, Algeria. With 1,800 Italian POWs onboard and just 23 minutes out of El Alamein in the Mediterranean Sea on the night of August 16, 1943, she was hit by a Nazi Germany aircraft-dropped aerial torpedo 16 miles north of Bone, Algeria. The explosion killed 264 and injured 142 of the 1,800 Italian POWs on board. There were no casualties to the crew of 43 Merchant Marines, 27 US Navy Armed Guard, 26 British guards, and 7 Army security detail. It was a harrowing experience for the POWs in the cargo holds. Many of the POWs later would join the Allies Italian Service Units. The torpedo hit in cargo holds No. 1 and No. 2, which flooded quickly. The able Italian POWs went to the lifeboats, but they did not know how to lower them; some jumped overboard thinking the ship was sinking. The flooding of holds 1 and 2 caused the bow to start to sink and rudder and propeller to rise out of the water. Cargo holds 4 and 5 were flooded so that the propeller was back in the water, thus the ship could continue. Under her own power, she was able to continue to Bone, Algeria for temporary repairs. The ship received permanent repairs at Gibraltar to fix the 25- by 21-foot hole in her side. After repairs, she returned to New York City and returned to Southampton.

On March 14, 1944, she took part in convoy SC 155 (Liverpool-Halifax). SC 155 was a convoy of slower ships, traveling at 4 knots. She joined SC 155 as she was not able to travel at her top speed of 11 knots after her damage. They departed Halifax on March 14, 1944, and arrived at Liverpool on the 29th.

== Normandy Landings (D-Day) ==
Due to the ship's damage, she was selected to help with the Normandy landings; she was used as a sea breakwater by scuttling on the June 8, 1944, in position Gooseberry 1 in a Mulberry Harbour off of Utah Beach, Normandy at the beachhead. She was damaged more by a severe storm on 19–22 June 1944. On July 16, 1944, she was declared a complete loss and officially abandoned. The other nine ships that were scuttled to form Gooseberry 1 were the David O. Saylor, George S. Wasson, Matt W. Ransom, West Cheswald, West Honaker, West Nohno, Willis A. Slater, Victory Sword and Vitruvius.

== Awards ==
Captain Even Evenson, Master of the SS Benjamin, was given the Merchant Marine Distinguished Service Medal by the President of the United States for distinguished service in the line of duty. Captain Evensen help calm the panicked prisoners and performed correct flood control to save the ship. This showed courage, seamanship, and discipline in the United States Merchant Marine. Admiral Emory Scott Land presented the award.

== See also ==
- Allied technological cooperation during World War II
- Empire ships
- List of Liberty ships
- Fort ship
- Park ships
- Type C1 ship
- Type C2 ship
- Type T2 tanker
- Victory ship
- U.S. Merchant Marine Academy
