= MS West Grama =

American cargo ship

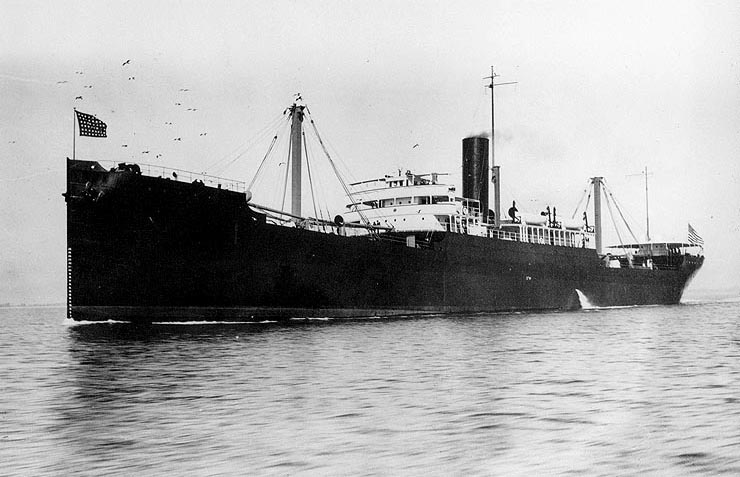
- West Grama underway in 1919.

History

United States
- Name: USS West Grama (ID-3794)
- Builder: Los Angeles Shipbuilding & Dry Dock Co.; San Pedro, California
- Yard number: 9
- Launched: 4 July 1918
- Completed: December 1918
- Acquired: 9 January 1919
- Commissioned: 9 January 1919
- Decommissioned: 16 June 1919
- Fate: Returned to USSB

History
- Name: 1919: SS West Grama; 1927: MS West Grama
- Owner: USSB
- Operator: 1927: American Republics Line
- Acquired: 16 June 1919
- Identification: Official number: 217220
- Honors and awards: 1 battle star, Invasion of Normandy, June 1944
- Fate: Sunk as part of "gooseberry" breakwater off Normandy, 8 June 1944

General characteristics
- Type: Design 1013 ship
- Tonnage: 5,445 GRT
- Length: 410 ft 1 in (124.99 m) (LPP); 423 ft 9 in (129.16 m)
- Beam: 54 ft 6 in (16.61 m)
- Draft: 23 ft 11 in (7.29 m)
- Depth of hold: 29 ft 9 in (9.07 m)
- Propulsion: as built: 1 × triple-expansion steam engine; 1926: 1 × 6-cylinder diesel engine, 3,000 hp (2,200 kW)
- Speed: 11.5 knots (21.3 km/h)
- Capacity: 1926: 8,028 DWT; 50 passengers
- Complement: 70 (as USS West Grama)
- Armament: None

MS West Grama, sometimes spelled as West Gramma, was a diesel-powered cargo ship of the United States Maritime Commission (USMC) that was sunk as part of the "gooseberry" breakwater off Utah Beach during the Normandy invasion. Prior to her diesel conversion, she was known as SS West Grama. In 1919, she was briefly taken up by the United States Navy under the name USS West Grama (ID-3794).

SS West Grama was built as a steam-powered cargo ship in 1918 for the United States Shipping Board (USSB), a predecessor of the USMC. She was part of the West boats, a series of steel-hulled cargo ships built on the West Coast of the United States for the World War I war effort, and was the 9th ship built at Los Angeles Shipbuilding & Dry Dock Company in San Pedro, California. She was commissioned into the Naval Overseas Transportation Service (NOTS) of the United States Navy as USS West Grama (ID-3794) in January 1919. She became the first American-flagged vessel to enter Bulgarian waters when she delivered a load of wheat flour to Varna in early 1919. After her one overseas trip for the Navy, she was decommissioned in June 1919 and returned to the USSB.

SS West Grama sailed between Genoa and New York early in her civilian career. In 1927, West Grama was outfitted with a diesel engine that replaced her original steam engine as part of a pilot program by the USSB. After her conversion, she sailed primarily between East Coast ports and South America. By the late 1930s, she had been laid up, but was reactivated for merchant service during World War II. She sailed primarily in the Caribbean until March 1944 when she sailed from the United States for the final time. She was scuttled in June as part of the "gooseberry" breakwater off Omaha Beach during the Normandy invasion, earning a battle star in the process.

== Design and construction ==
The West ships were cargo ships of similar size and design built by several shipyards on the west coast of the United States for the USSB for emergency use during World War I. All were given names that began with the word West, like West Grama, the ninth of some 40 West ships built by the Los Angeles Shipbuilding & Dry Dock Company of Los Angeles. West Grama (Los Angeles Shipbuilding yard number 9) was one of three Los Angeles Shipbuilding ships launched on 4 July 1918, (Note: The other two ships launched on 4 July 1918 were West Galeta and West Zula.) and was completed in December.

West Grama was 5,445 gross register tons (GRT), and was 410 feet 1 inch (124.99 m) long (between perpendiculars) and 54 feet 6 inches (16.61 m) abeam. She had a steel hull that displaced 12,225 t with a mean draft of 24 feet 2 inches (7.37 m). Her hold was 29 feet 9 inches (9.07 m) deep and she had a deadweight tonnage of 8,028 DWT. West Grama's power plant, as built, consisted of a single triple-expansion steam engine driving a single screw propeller, which moved the ship at up to 10.5 knots (19.4 km/h).

== Military career ==
West Grama was taken over by the U.S. Navy on 9 January 1919 at San Pedro, California, and was commissioned into the NOTS the same day. West Grama headed north to San Francisco to take on a load of wheat flour for delivery to Europe. (Note: The West ships, to avoid sailing empty to the East Coast, loaded grain products intended for European ports and sailed from the East Coast without unloading or transferring their cargo. To avoid extra handling of the cargo, the United States Shipping Board, by prior arrangement, received an equivalent amount of cargo space in foreign ships for other American cargos. See: Crowell and Wilson, pp. 358–59.) After undergoing boiler repairs at Union Iron Works, she departed San Francisco for Norfolk, Virginia, on 28 January. West Grama transited the Panama Canal on 14 February and got underway again on 19 February, after a four-day layover in the Canal Zone.

On 25 February, a half-submerged ship was spotted some 200 nautical miles (370 km) east-northeast of Nassau, Bahamas. Upon investigation, it was determined to be the wreck of the American schooner Nettie Shipman, but, with no signs of life aboard the hulk, West Grama continued on to Virginia, where she arrived three days later.

After general repairs and fuel replenishment, West Grama got underway for the Mediterranean on 13 March. Touching at Gibraltar, she next headed to Constantinople, Turkey, to unload part of her cargo, and then proceeded into the Black Sea. She arrived at Varna, Bulgaria, to unload the remainder of the flour, and, in the process, became the first American-flagged vessel to enter Bulgarian waters. After departure from Varna, West Grama returned to the United States via Gibraltar. She carried a mixed load of 13 depth charges and 218 long tons (221 t) of general cargo. In early June, during her return voyage, West Grama was disabled by some unspecified problem while west of Bermuda. The U.S. Navy cargo ship Eastport, en route from New Orleans to Cardiff, assisted West Grama, and the Navy dispatched the icebreaker Rogday from Boston to aid West Grama. It is not known what assistance was provided or if West Grama was even able to proceed on her own, but she arrived at Norfolk on 11 June. Five days later, West Grama was decommissioned and returned to the USSB for civilian service.

== Civilian career ==
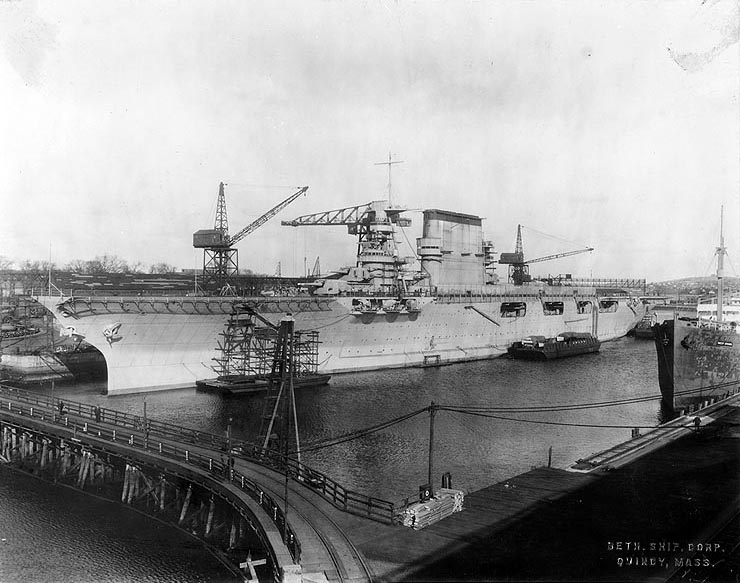
West Grama, at right, is across from the aircraft carrier Lexington at the Fore River Shipyard in November 1927. West Grama was undergoing diesel conversion at the time; Lexington was being fitted out.

After her return to the USSB, West Grama sailed on a Genoa – Gibraltar – New York route through 1920. In April 1920, West Grama carried some 52 passengers from Genoa and Gibraltar to New York. There is no mention in sources of the ship's activities over the next seven years, but in June 1927, the Los Angeles Times reported that West Grama had been selected for a $400,000 conversion from steam-power to diesel-power. By late November, the conversion, undergoing at the Fore River Shipyard near Boston, was nearly complete. The new engine was a McIntosh & Seymour double-acting diesel, the first of its type built in America. On 8 December, during successful sea trials of West Grama's new diesel power plant, a malfunction in a steam boiler used to heat the crew quarters caused minor damage to the ship.

Allocated to the American Republics Line for service to the east coast of South America, West Grama sailed for Buenos Aires, Argentina, where she had arrived by late January 1928, and back to New York by late March. In October 1929, West Grama was reportedly assigned to the new Pacific–South Africa Line by the USSB, an around-the-world venture under the management of J. J. Moore & Company. (Note: West Cusseta, Crown City, and West Honaker (another dieselized Los Angeles-built sister ship) were also assigned to the new service.) The Pacific–South Africa Line—the world's only all-diesel around-the-world service, as described by the Los Angeles Times—sailed from Los Angeles to South Africa via the Straits of Magellan, across the Indian Ocean to Japan and China, across the Pacific to San Francisco, and back to Los Angeles. It's not clear how long, if at all, West Grama sailed for this line. In July 1929, a report in The New York Times shows that West Grama was still in South American service, sailing to Santos, Brazil.

Sources are not clear as to all of West Grama's movements over the next years. Hints can be gleaned from contemporary news accounts. In March 1930, the Los Angeles Times reported that West Grama was en route from Balboa to San Francisco. The New York Times reported West Grama's arrival from Portland, Oregon in September, her departure for Fremantle, Western Australia in October 1933, and her arrival from Baltimore in March the following year. After these mentions, West Grama disappears from contemporary news accounts, and by 1939, West Grama had been laid up in a reserve fleet.

== World War II ==
In December 1940, the USMC, a successor to the USSB, announced that it was seeking bids for the sale of 24 ships from its reserve fleet, including West Grama. In January 1941, the USMC announced that a consortium of Commonwealth shipping lines had been the high bidders for 19 of the 20 ships still offered. The highest bid for West Grama was $80,000, (Note: The bid for West Grama was by far the lowest bid—by some $150,000—for any of the ships.) but it is not clear if the bid was, in fact, accepted; by November, West Grama was sailing between Antofagasta, Chile, and New York, but remained under the American flag. From July 1942 through February 1944, West Grama sailed between the United States and Caribbean ports, frequently traveling in convoys. The ship's recorded movements show her calling at Cristóbal, Guantánamo Bay, Trinidad, Key West, and Pilottown, Louisiana. In mid-February 1944, West Grama sailed from Key West to New York, and from there, on to Boston.

== Final voyage ==
West Grama had been selected to become one of the blockships for the Allied invasion of France, then in the planning stages. Though the specific modifications performed on West Grama are not revealed in sources, modifications for other ships do appear. In November 1944, The Christian Science Monitor reported that blockships dispatched from Boston, like West Grama, had been loaded with "tons of sand and cement" and had been rigged with explosive charges before departing the port. Further, existing antiaircraft weapons had been moved higher up on the ship and supplemented by additional guns. An account by Cesar Poropat, chief engineer aboard West Honaker, another blockship dispatched from Boston, mentions that shipyard workers proceeded to cut holes in "strategic places".

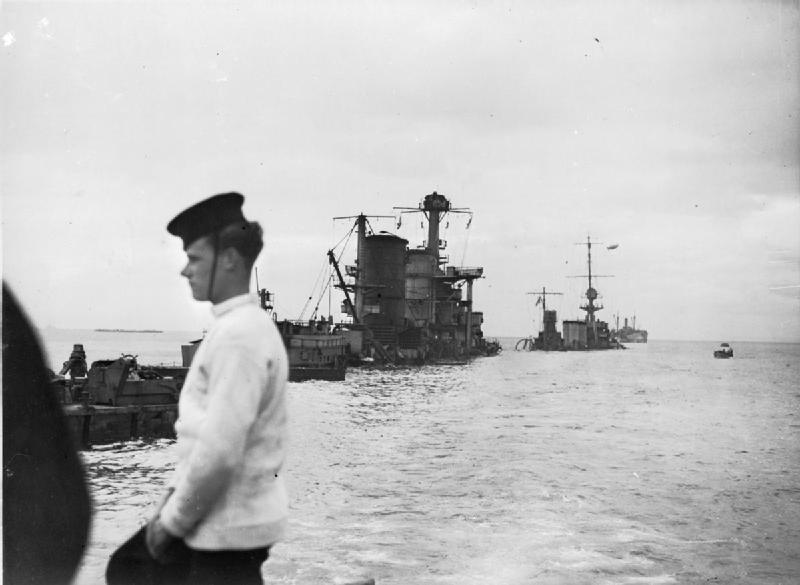
A view of the "gooseberry" breakwater at Sword Beach, showing the partially submerged ships. West Grama was scuttled to help form the "gooseberry" at Omaha Beach shortly after the Normandy Landings in mid-June 1944.

West Grama departed Boston on 25 March and arrived at Halifax two days later. Departing from that port on 29 March, she sailed in Convoy SC 156 and arrived at Barry Roads on 13 April, and by 7 May, she had arrived at Methil. West Grama's whereabouts and movements through early June are not recorded. Other ships that had been selected as blockships assembled in a "corncob" fleet at Oban, though it's not clear if West Grama did or not. The "corncob" fleet was the group of ships intended to be sunk to form the "gooseberries", shallow-water artificial harbors for landing craft. Poropat reports that once the ship crews were told of their mission while anchored at Oban, they were not permitted to leave the ships.

Three "corncob" convoys, consisting of what one author called the "dregs of the North Atlantic shipping pool", departed from Poole and reached the Normandy beachhead the next day, shortly after the D-Day landings. Poropat reports that the corncob ships traveled under cover of darkness and, stripped of all unnecessary equipment, carried no radios, having only a signal lamp (with a spare bulb) for communication. Once at the designated location, the ships were put into position and scuttled over the next days, under heavy German artillery fire. Naval Armed Guardsmen manned the guns on all the gooseberry ships to protect against frequent German air attacks. All the while, harbor pilots—about half of the New York Bar Pilots Association, according to one source—carefully positioned the ships. West Grama was sunk off Omaha Beach on 8 June, though she continued to serve as an antiaircraft platform manned by Navy gun crews. On 9 June, West Grama's gunners fired 19 times and were credited with assisting in the downing of one German airplane; only one of West Grama's Navy gunners was wounded during the attack. On 14 June, West Grama escaped serious damage when a bomb landed near the ship. By the time her Naval Armed Guardsmen were replaced by Army crews on 18 June, they had received credit for a second assist, and had been awarded a battle star for their participation in the Normandy Landings.

== Bibliography ==
- Askew, William C.; Director of Naval History (1946). History of the Naval Armed Guard Afloat: World War II (OP-414). United States Naval Administration in World War II: Office of Naval Operations. Washington, D.C.: Navy Department.
- Crowell, Benedict; Robert Forrest Wilson (1921). The Road to France: The Transportation of Troops and Military Supplies, 1917–1918. How America Went to War: An Account From Official Sources of the Nation's War Activities, 1917–1920. New Haven: Yale University Press. OCLC 18696066.
- Dineen, Joseph Sylvester (1920). Holy Cross College service record, war of 1917. Worcester, Massachusetts: Holy Cross College. OCLC 2076747.
- Howe, Hartley E. (June 2004). "D-Day's Secret Weapons: Mullberries, Whales, Gooseberries, Phoenix, & Pluto". Sea Classics. Canoga Park, California: Challenge Publications. OCLC 60621086.
- Jordan, Roger W. (2006) [1999]. The World's Merchant Fleets, 1939: The Particulars And Wartime Fates of 6,000 Ships. Annapolis, Maryland: Naval Institute Press. ISBN 978-1-59114-959-0. OCLC 150361480.
- Naval Historical Center. "Eastport". Dictionary of American Naval Fighting Ships. Navy Department, Naval History and Heritage Command.
- Naval Historical Center (2005-10-20). "Rogday". Dictionary of American Naval Fighting Ships. Navy Department, Naval History & Heritage Command.
- Naval Historical Center. "West Grama". Dictionary of American Naval Fighting Ships. Navy Department, Naval History & Heritage Command.
- Richard, Dorothy Elizabeth; Office of Naval History (1947). Glossary of U.S. naval code words. Washington, D.C.: United States Government Printing Office. OCLC 51039630. Archived from the original on 2011-09-20.
