= SS West Nohno =

American merchant ship

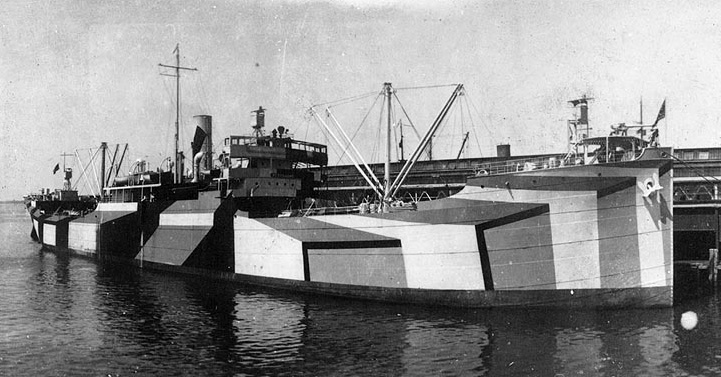
- West Nohno had design and measurements similar to West Shore, a sister ship from the same shipyard seen here c. 1918.

History

United States
- Name: West Nohno
- Owner: USSB
- Builder: Northwest Steel; Portland, Oregon
- Yard number: 24
- Launched: 12 February 1919
- Completed: May 1919
- Identification: Official number: 217936
- Fate: Sunk as part of "gooseberry" breakwater off Normandy, 11 June 1944

General characteristics
- Type: Design 1013 ship
- Tonnage: 6,186 GRT; 8,580 DWT
- Length: 409 ft 9 in (124.89 m) (LPP); 423 ft 10 in (129.18 m)
- Beam: 54 ft 2 in (16.51 m)
- Draft: 23 ft 11 in (7.29 m)
- Propulsion: 1 × steam turbine
- Speed: 11.5 knots (21.3 km/h)

SS West Nohno was a cargo ship of the United States Shipping Board (USSB) launched shortly after the end of World War I. The ship was inspected by the United States Navy for possible use as USS West Nohno (ID-4029) but was neither taken into the Navy nor ever commissioned under that name.

West Nohno was built in 1919 for the USSB, as a part of the West ships, a series of steel-hulled cargo ships built on the West Coast of the United States for the World War I war effort, and was the 24th ship built at Northwest Steel in Portland, Oregon. Completed too late for that conflict, she operated for a number of years as a merchant ship sailing to African ports for the American West African Line.

In November 1941, West Nohno became the first American merchant ship to be armed prior to the United States' entry into World War II. Shortly after the U.S. entry to that conflict, she was employed for one roundtrip to the Soviet Union in March 1942. After her return, she sailed mainly between the United States and United Kingdom ports. In 1943, a civilian crewman aboard West Nohno was convicted of sedition for trying to incite a rebellion among members of the ship's crew and Naval Armed Guard. In February 1944, she sailed from the United States for the final time, and was scuttled in June as part of the "gooseberry" breakwater off Utah Beach during the Normandy invasion, earning a battle star for the ship.

== Design and construction ==
The West ships were cargo ships of similar size and design built by several shipyards on the West Coast of the United States for the USSB for emergency use during World War I. All were given names that began with the word West, like West Nohno, the one of some 40 West ships built by the Northwest Steel of Portland, Oregon. West Nohno (Northwest Steel yard number 24, USSB hull number 1080) was launched 12 February 1919 and completed in May 1919.

West Nohno was 6,186 gross register tons (GRT), and was 409 feet 9 inches (124.89 m) long (between perpendiculars) and 54 feet 2 inches (16.51 m) abeam. She had a steel hull and had a deadweight tonnage of 8,580 DWT. Sources do not give West Nohno's other hull characteristics, but West Cheswald, a sister ship also built at Northwest Steel had a displacement of 12,200 t with a mean draft of 24 feet 1 inch (7.34 m), and a hold 29 feet 9 inches (9.07 m) deep. West Nohno power plant consisted of a single steam turbine that drove a single screw propeller, which moved the ship at up to 11.5 knots (21.3 km/h).

== Early career ==
West Nohno was inspected by the United States Navy after completion for possible use and was assigned the identification number of 4029. Had she been commissioned, she would have been known as USS West Nohno (ID-4029), but the Navy neither took over the ship nor commissioned her.

Information on West Nohno's early career is incomplete, but through the end of 1920 the cargo ship sailed on a New York – Glasgow route. By early 1922, West Nohno was sailing for the USSB-owned American West African Line. The principal ports visited by American West African ships were Dakar, Freetown, Monrovia, and Lagos. News items reported that West Nohno also visited Teneriffe, Accra, Las Palmas, Grand-Bassam, Seccondee, and Saint Vincent. West Nohno was still on African routes as late as 1928, when the USSB began accepting bids for the purchase of the American West African Line.

From 1928 to 1941, little is known about West Nohno's activities. At some point during this period, she was laid up as part of a reserve fleet, in which she remained as late as 1939. By May 1941, now under ownership of the United States Maritime Commission (USMC) (a successor to the USSB), the ship had been reactivated and was scheduled to sail in Red Sea service under the operation of American Export Lines. In this Red Sea service, ships would carry materiel for the British to Red Sea and Gulf of Aden ports and carry strategic materials needed by the United States on return journeys.

== World War II ==
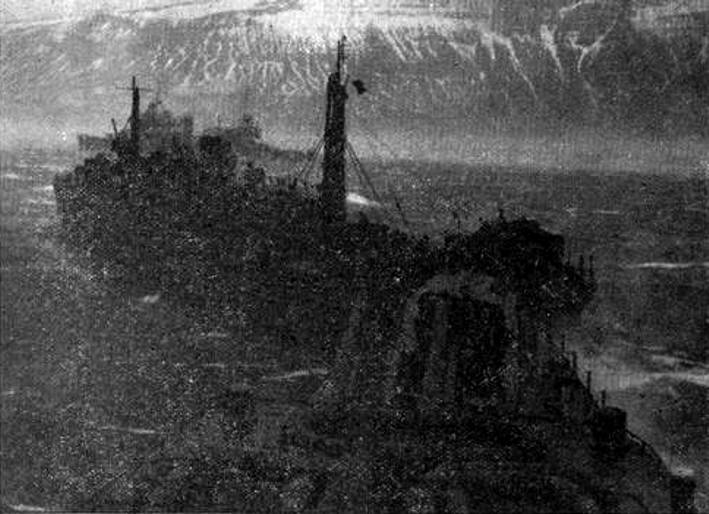
USS Wichita collides with West Nohno in Hvalfjörður, 15 January 1942, damaging the cruiser.

When amendments to the U.S. Neutrality Acts in late 1941 allowed United States merchant ships to be armed for service in the Atlantic, West Nohno became the first vessel so equipped when a large deck gun and three anti-aircraft gun emplacements were installed by workers at the Tietjen & Lang Drydock in Hoboken, New Jersey in late November. Navy officials, citing secrecy concerns, would not reveal the size of the gun, but allowed that the bore was between 3 and 6 inches (76 and 152 mm). While at the shipyard, West Nohno's wheelhouse and radio shack were reinforced with thick walls of concrete to protect against machine-gun bullets, and the ship was repainted "battleship gray".

After her guns were installed, West Nohno had made her way to Sydney, Nova Scotia, by 27 December when she sailed as a part of transatlantic Convoy SC 86. With her destination set for Murmansk, West Nohno peeled off from the convoy and headed to Reykjavík, Iceland. While at anchor in Iceland, West Nohno experienced a winter storm from 15 to 19 January 1942. On 15 January, the storm, packing winds of 80 knots (150 km/h) and gusts of up to 100 knots (190 km/h), drove West Nohno into USS Wichita, damaging the heavy cruiser. Apparently suffering no major damage herself in the collision, West Nohno joined Arctic convoy PQ 9, which sailed on 1 February and arrived at Murmansk nine days later. Though the convoy had arrived at its destination, the danger of German attack was still present. The nearest German airfield was 35 miles (56 km) away—about 7 to 10 minutes flying time—which gave almost no advance warning of air raids. German dive bombers would silently glide in below Soviet anti-aircraft fire, drop their payloads, and fly away. (Note: There is no record of any specific attack on West Nohno while at Murmansk, but Yaka, another American cargo ship, experienced 48 air attacks in a nine-day period in April. See: Morison, p. 372.) Despite the fact that Murmansk had limited port facilities and typically slow unloading of cargo, sometimes requiring ships to remain in port for weeks or months, West Nohno was ready to sail in Convoy QP 8 on 1 March, returning to Reykjavik on 11 March. She sailed for Halifax eleven days later and arrived on 7 April.

West Nohno had made her way to Hampton Roads, Virginia, by 29 May, when she sailed for Key West, Florida. After her 4 June arrival at Key West, she began a nine-month journey to Alexandria, Cairo, and other ports. During this extended voyage, three crewmen entered one of West Nohno's fuel tanks to clean it while the ship was at Suez on 29 September 1942. The crewmen did not use gas masks and were soon overcome by fumes. The second mate of the Norwegian tanker Britannia, Henning Vaagsnes, entered the tank and removed all three men. Two of West Nohno's men survived but the third, despite two hours of attempts to revive him by Vaagsnes, did not. For his efforts, Vaagsnes received a pair of binoculars from U.S. president Franklin D. Roosevelt and a gold watch from the ship owners. He was also awarded St. Olav's medal with Oak Branch, a medal awarded for personal courage and bravery by the Norwegian government. (Note: Vaagsnes' St. Olav's medal with Oak Branch was awarded posthumously in 1989. See: Lawson, Siri (12 August 2008). "M/T Britannia". Norwegian Merchant Fleet 1939-1945. WarSailors.com.)

In February 1943, the West Nohno completed her nine-month journey when she arrived at Mobile, Alabama, after sailing via Guantánamo Bay, Cuba, and Key West. The Chicago Daily Tribune reported that during this voyage, seaman James Orville Couchois had incited subordination and disloyalty among the crew. The head of the Naval Armed Guard detachment aboard West Nohno reported Couchois' activities, as well as comments from other crew members on the ship. After the ship had docked at Mobile, Couchois was removed from the ship and ultimately faced a trial for sedition. Couchois, who was the deck manager for the National Maritime Union of the Congress of Industrial Organizations, was convicted and sentenced to a prison term of five years.

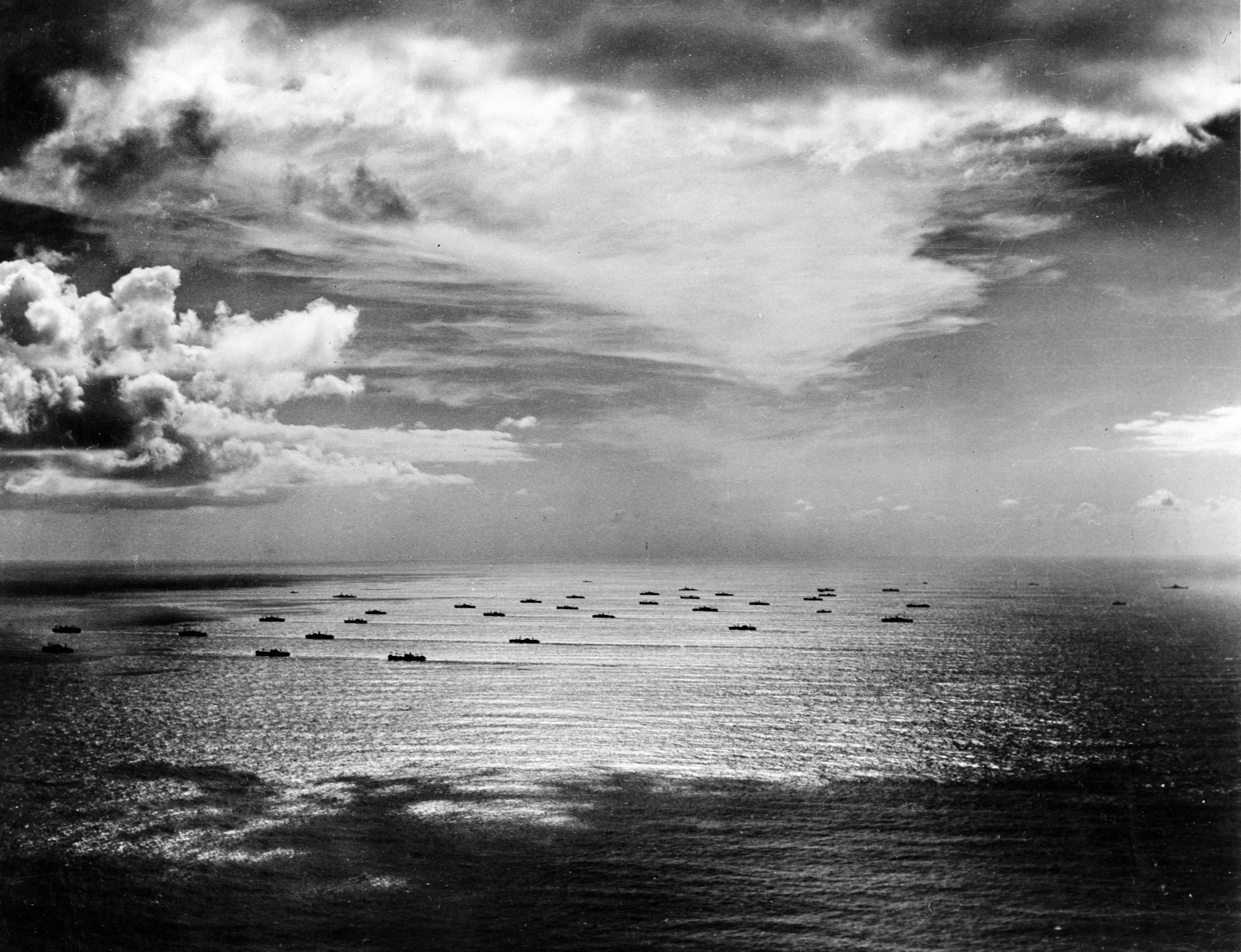
West Nohno sailed in several transatlantic convoys, like this typical one, seen in 1942.

In late March, West Nohno began the first of three Boston–Liverpool round trips. On the Halifax–Liverpool leg of this first trip, she had some unspecified problem that required her return to Halifax, but it must have been a minor problem since she sailed again for Liverpool a week later. The cargo ship returned to Boston on 3 June and began her second voyage to Liverpool on 30 June. While in the UK she called at Loch Ewe, Methil, and Oban in July and August before her 6 September return to Boston. Her third journey was an extended one that began by sailing from Boston on 3 October. She arrived at Liverpool three weeks later. During the next seven weeks, she made her way to Milford Haven, from which she began her last westbound transatlantic crossing on 13 December. West Nohno arrived in Boston on 5 January 1944.

== Final voyage ==
West Nohno had been selected to become one of the blockships for the Allied invasion of France, then in the planning stages. Though the specific modifications performed on West Nohno are not revealed in sources, modifications for other ships do appear. In November 1944, The Christian Science Monitor reported that blockships dispatched from Boston, like West Nohno, had been loaded with "tons of sand and cement" and had been rigged with explosive charges before departing the port. Further, existing antiaircraft weapons had been moved higher up on the ship and supplemented by additional guns. An account by Cesar Poropat, chief engineer aboard West Honaker, another blockship dispatched from Boston, mentions that transverse bulkheads aboard that ship were cut open to facilitate sinking.

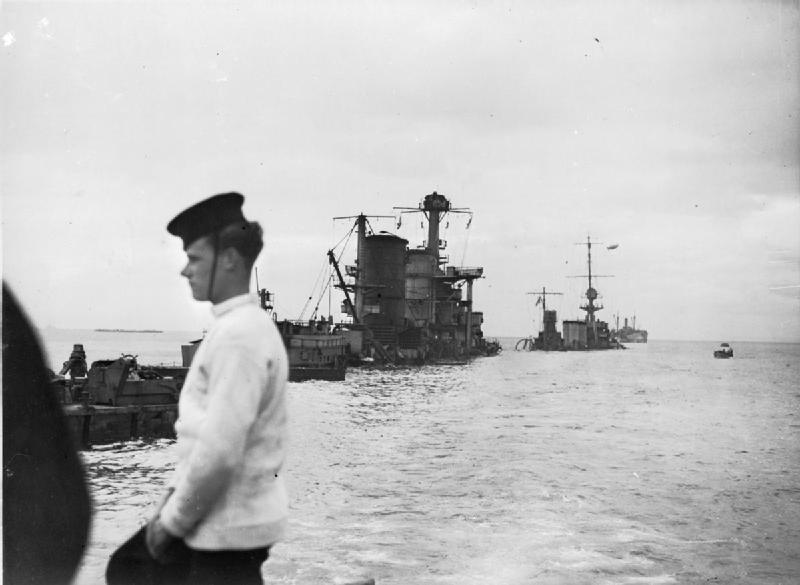
A view of the "gooseberry" breakwater at Sword Beach, showing the partially submerged ships. West Nohno was scuttled to help form the "gooseberry" at Utah Beach shortly after the Normandy landings in mid-June 1944.

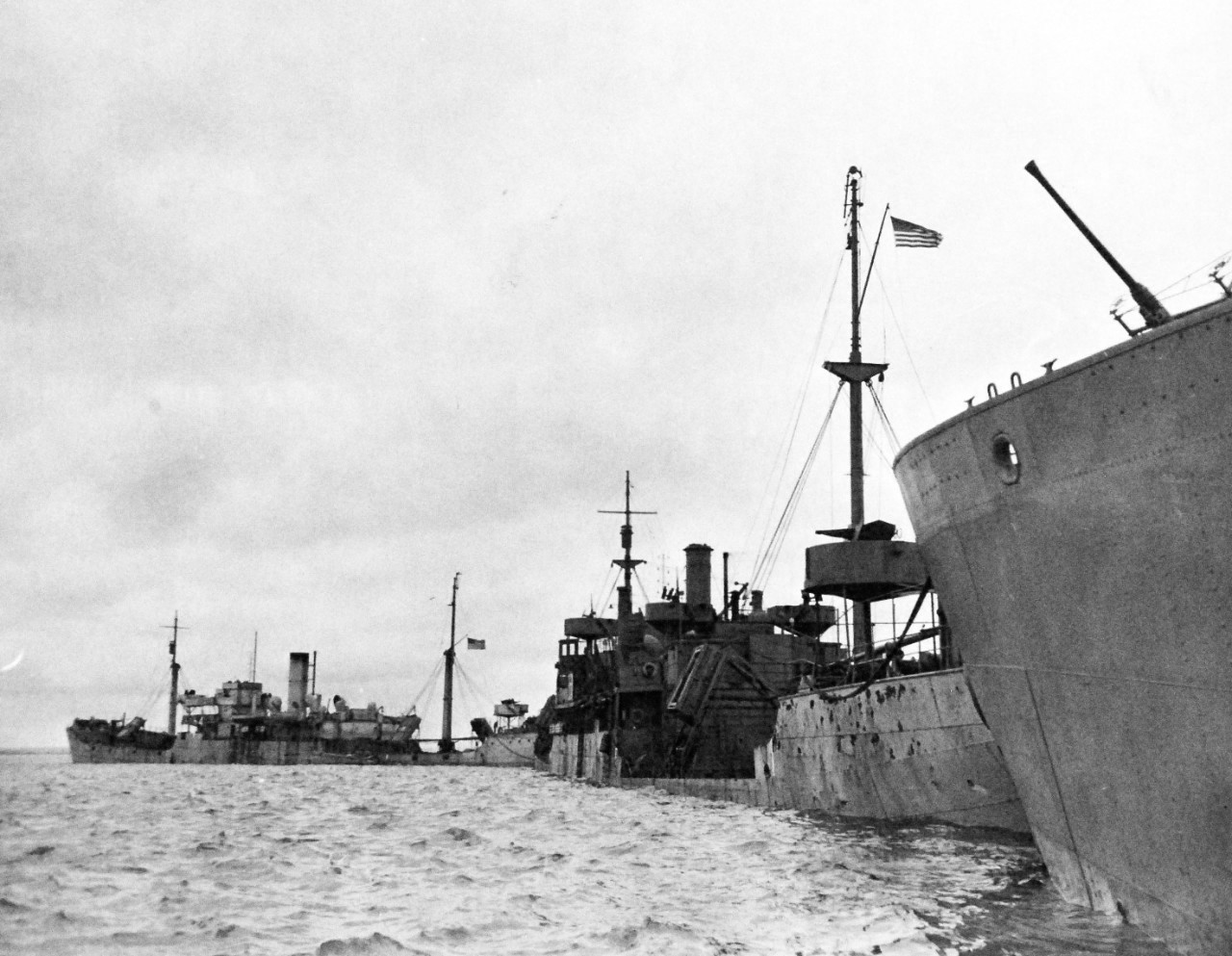
Gooseberry line of ship used as artificial harbour breakwater in June 1944

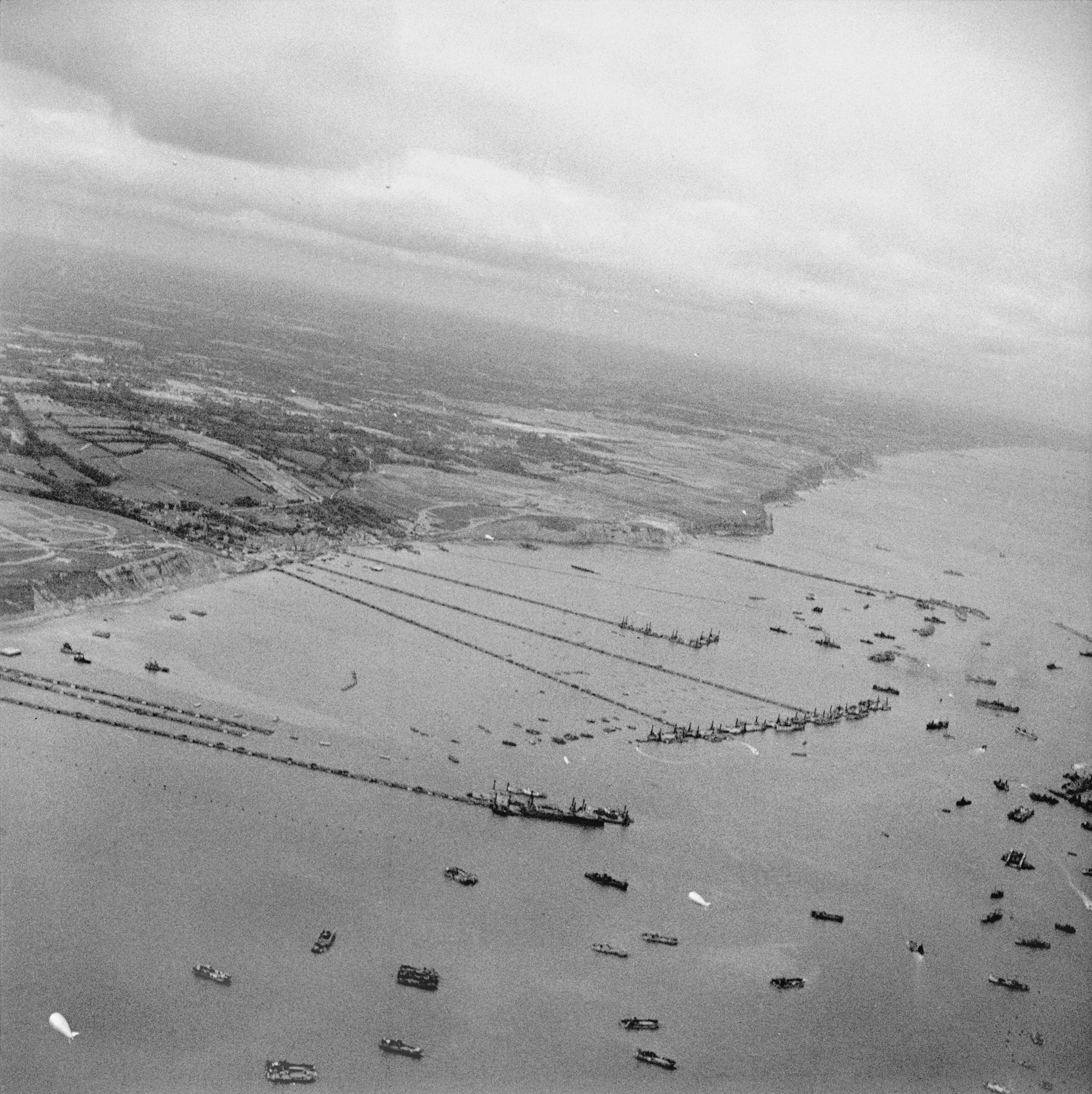
Mulberry artificial harbour in Normandy in September 1944, used to block the incoming wave

West Nohno departed Boston on 24 February and arrived at Halifax two days later. Departing from that port on 29 February, she sailed in Convoy HX 281 and arrived at Milford Haven on 15 March. She departed there for Portsmouth the same day. West Nohno's whereabouts and movements through early June are not recorded. Other ships that had been selected as blockships assembled in a "corncob" fleet at Oban, though it's not clear if West Nohno did or not. The "corncob" fleet was the group of ships intended to be sunk to form the "gooseberries", shallow-water artificial harbors for landing craft. Poropat reports that once the ship crews were told of their mission while anchored at Oban, they were not permitted to leave the ships.

Three "corncob" convoys, consisting of what one author called the "dregs of the North Atlantic shipping pool", departed from Poole and reached the Normandy beachhead the next day, shortly after the D-Day landings. Poropat reports that the corncob ships traveled under cover of darkness and, stripped of all unnecessary equipment, carried no radios, having only a signal lamp (with a spare bulb) for communication. Once at the designated location, the ships were put into position and scuttled over the next days, under heavy German artillery fire. Naval Armed Guardsmen manned the guns on all the gooseberry ships to protect against frequent German air attacks; West Nohno's gunners assisted in shooting down several planes on 10 June. All the while, harbor pilots—about half of the New York Bar Pilots Association, according to one source—carefully positioned the ships. West Nohno and West Cheswald were the last two ships sunk off Utah Beach when they went down on 11 June. Even though she had been sunk, West Nohno continued to serve as an antiaircraft platform manned by Navy gun crews until 18 June, and by Army crews after that date. West Nohno's naval gunners were awarded a battle star for participation in the Normandy Landings.

== Awards ==
Harold T. Andrews was an ordinary seaman on the SS West Nohno on 15 September 1942 when the ship was in Suez, Egypt, There an engineer officer had been overcome by gases in a forepeak tank. Andrews lost his life trying to rescue the engineer. He was given the Merchant Marine Distinguished Service Medal by The President of the United States. For the President the award was given by Admiral Emory S. Land.

== Bibliography ==
- Askew, William C.; Director of Naval History (1946). History of the Naval Armed Guard Afloat: World War II (OP-414). United States Naval Administration in World War II: Office of Naval Operations. Washington, D.C.: Navy Department.
- Cressman, Robert (2000). "Chapter IV: 1942". The Official Chronology of the U.S. Navy in World War II. Annapolis, Maryland: Naval Institute Press. ISBN 978-1-55750-149-3. OCLC 41977179.
- Crowell, Benedict; Robert Forrest Wilson (1921). The Road to France: The Transportation of Troops and Military Supplies, 1917–1918. How America Went to War: An Account From Official Sources of the Nation's War Activities, 1917–1920. New Haven: Yale University Press. ISBN 1-143-73956-6. OCLC 18696066.
- Howe, Hartley E. (June 2004). "D-Day's Secret Weapons: Mullberries, Whales, Gooseberries, Phoenix, & Pluto". Sea Classics. Canoga Park, California: Challenge Publications. OCLC 60621086.
- Jordan, Roger W. (2006) [1999]. The World's Merchant Fleets, 1939: The Particulars And Wartime Fates of 6,000 Ships. Annapolis, Maryland: Naval Institute Press. ISBN 978-1-59114-959-0. OCLC 150361480.
- Morison, Samuel Eliot (June 1975) [November 1947]. History of United States Naval Operations in World War II, Volume One: The Battle of the Atlantic, September 1939 – May 1943. Boston, Massachusetts: Little Brown. OCLC 7395406.
- Naval Historical Center. "West Cheswald". Dictionary of American Naval Fighting Ships. Navy Department, Naval History and Heritage Command.
- Naval Historical Center. "West Nohno". Dictionary of American Naval Fighting Ships. Navy Department, Naval History & Heritage Command.
- Richard, Dorothy Elizabeth; Office of Naval History (1947). Glossary of U.S. naval code words. Washington, D.C.: United States Government Printing Office. OCLC 51039630. Archived from the original on 21 April 1999.
- Stanford, Alfred (1951). Force Mulberry: The Planning and Installation of the Artificial Harbor Off U.S. Normandy Beaches in World War II. New York: Morrow. ISBN 1-4437-2147-6. OCLC 576288.
