= USS Rogday =

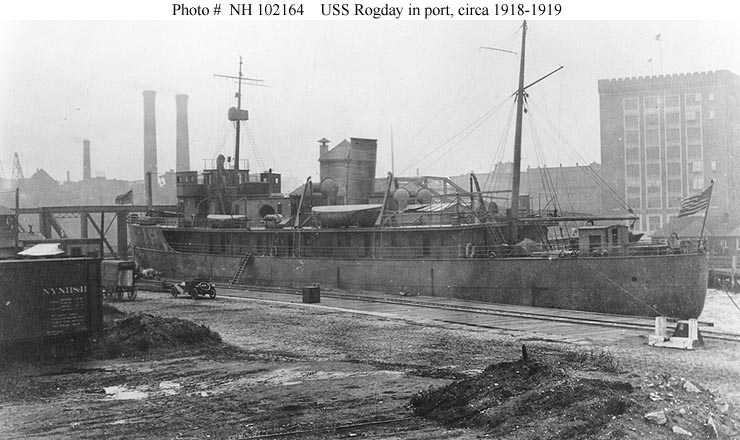
- USS Rogday (ID-3583), probably at Boston, Massachusetts, in 1918 or 1919.

History

United States
- Name: USS Rogday
- Namesake: Previous name retained
- Builder: Manitowoc Shipbuilding & Dry Dock Company, Manitowoc, Wisconsin
- Completed: 1915
- Acquired: 15 November 1918
- Commissioned: 22 November 1918
- Decommissioned: 18 June 1919
- Fate: Transferred to United States Shipping Board 24 September 1919
- Notes: Served as commercial icebreaker and cargo ship SS Nevada 1915–1917, as Imperial Russian SS Rogday 1917–1918 and 1919–1921, and as SS Nevada from 1921; Foundered 18 December 1943

General characteristics
- Type: Icebreaker and cargo ship
- Tonnage: 2,122 Gross register tons
- Length: 230 ft (70 m)
- Beam: 42 ft (13 m)
- Depth of hold: 24 ft (7.3 m)
- Propulsion: Steam engine
- Complement: 96

USS Rogday (ID-3538) was a United States Navy icebreaker and cargo ship in commission from 1918 to 1919.

== Construction, early career, acquisition, and commissioning ==
Rogday was built in 1915 as the commercial icebreaking cargo ship SS Nevada by the Manitowoc Shipbuilding & Dry Dock Company at Manitowoc, Wisconsin. Nevada operated on the Great Lakes until March 1917, when the Imperial Russian government purchased her and renamed her SS Rogday. Due to the outbreak of the Russian Revolution that month, however, she never was delivered to Russia and remained in North America. Rogday was at Sydney, Nova Scotia, Canada, on 15 November 1918 when the United States Shipping Board acquired her and transferred her to the U.S. Navy the same day. The Navy assigned her the naval registry identification number 3583 and commissioned her on 22 November 1918 at Sydney as USS Rogday (ID-3583).

== Operational history ==
Assigned to the 1st Naval District for use as an icebreaker, Rogday departed Sydney on 5 December 1918 bound for Halifax, Nova Scotia. She then moved on from Halifax to Boston, Massachusetts. She remained inactive at Boston until June 1919, when she was ordered to sea to assist the damaged cargo ship USS West Grama (ID-3794) in the North Atlantic Ocean west of Bermuda. She then proceeded eastward to Bermuda, where she anchored from 7 to 11 June 1919 before returning to Boston.

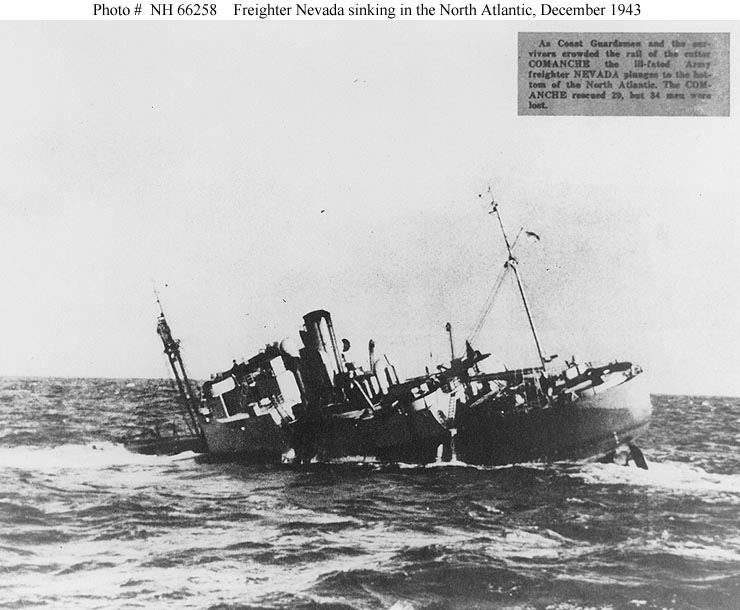
SS Nevada sinking during a gale in the North Atlantic Ocean off South Carolina, photographed by the United States Coast Guard Cutter Comanche (WPG-76) sometime between 15 and 18 December 1943.

== Decommissioning and later career ==
Rogday was decommissioned on 18 June 1919. On 24 September 1919, the Navy transferred her back to the U.S. Shipping Board, which in turn transferred her back to representatives of the now-deposed Imperial Russian government the same day.

In 1921, the Russians sold Rogday to the Père Marquette Line Steamers Company of Grand Haven, Michigan, which renamed her SS Nevada and placed her back in commercial service on the Great Lakes. Nevada remained in service on the Great Lakes until 1942 or 1943, being sold successively to the Muskegon Dock & Fuel Company of Muskegon, Michigan, in 1935 – when her appearance was greatly altered when she was converted to a roll-on/roll-off vehicle and cargo carrier – then to the Wisconsin and Michigan Steamship Company of Milwaukee, Wisconsin, in 1940, and finally to the Sand Products Corporation of Milwaukee in 1941.

In 1942 or 1943, Nevada's Great Lakes career finally came to an end when the United States Maritime Commission purchased her for use on the high seas during World War II. On 15 December 1943 she was abandoned during a gale in the North Atlantic off South Carolina; although 34 members of her crew lost their lives, the United States Coast Guard Cutter Comanche (WPG-76) managed to save 29 others in a "dramatic and difficult feat of seamanship." Efforts to salvage the abandoned Nevada over the next three days failed as the storm continued, and she sank on 18 December 1943.
