= SS West Cheswald =

American cargo ship

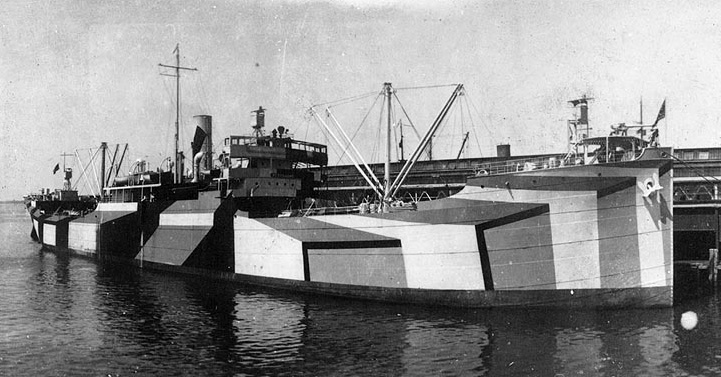
- West Cheswald had design and measurements similar to West Shore, a sister ship from the same shipyard seen here c. 1918.

History

United States
- Name: West Cheswald
- Owner: USSB
- Builder: Northwest Steel; Portland, Oregon
- Yard number: 32
- Launched: 20 June 1919
- Completed: September 1919
- Identification: Official Number: 2218797
- Fate: Sunk as part of "gooseberry" breakwater off Normandy, 11 June 1944

General characteristics
- Type: Design 1013 ship
- Tonnage: 6,187 GRT; 8,600 LT DWT
- Displacement: 12,200 t
- Length: 412 ft 1 in (125.60 m) (LPP); 423 ft 9 in (129.16 m) (overall)
- Beam: 54 ft 6 in (16.61 m)
- Draft: 24 ft 1 in (7.34 m) (mean)
- Depth of hold: 29 ft 9 in (9.07 m)
- Propulsion: 1 × steam turbine
- Speed: 11.5 knots (21.3 km/h)

SS West Cheswald was a cargo ship for the United States Shipping Board (USSB) launched shortly after the end of World War I. The ship was inspected by the United States Navy for possible use as USS West Cheswald (ID-4199) but was neither taken into the Navy nor ever commissioned under that name. West Cheswald was built in 1919 for the USSB, as a part of the West boats, a series of steel-hulled cargo ships built on the West Coast of the United States for the World War I war effort, and was the 32nd ship built at Northwest Steel in Portland, Oregon.

She operated for several years as a merchant ship, and was involved in a court case that eventually reached the Supreme Court of the United States in 1928. She was laid up in New Orleans, Louisiana, until late 1940 when she was reactivated and refitted to carry American defense-related cargos to Africa and chromium and manganese ore to the United States.

Continuing in African service after the United States entered World War II, she was diverted in March 1942 for one round trip to the Soviet Union, enduring German attacks that earned her U.S. Navy Armed Guard a battle star. After her return, she sailed mainly between the United States and African and Caribbean ports. In March 1944, she sailed from the United States for one final time, and was scuttled in June as part of the "gooseberry" breakwater off Utah Beach during the Normandy invasion, earning a second battle star in the process.

== Design and construction ==
The West ships were cargo ships of similar size and design built by several shipyards on the West Coast of the United States for the USSB for emergency use during World War I. All were given names that began with the word West, like West Cheswald, the one of some 40 West ships built by the Northwest Steel of Portland, Oregon. West Cheswald (Northwest Steel yard number 32, USSB hull number 1421) was completed in September 1919.

West Cheswald was 6,187 gross register tons (GRT), and was 412 feet 1 inch (125.60 m) long (between perpendiculars) and 54 feet 6 inches (16.61 m) abeam. She had a steel hull with a hold that was 29 feet 9 inches (9.07 m) deep. She had a displacement of 12,200 t with a mean draft of 24 feet 1 inch (7.34 m). The ship had a single steam turbine that drove a single screw propeller, and moved the ship at up to 11.5 knots (21.3 km/h).

== Early career ==
West Cheswald was inspected by the 13th Naval District of the United States Navy after completion for possible use as a service collier and was assigned the identification number of 4199. Had she been commissioned, she would have been known as USS West Cheswald (ID-4199), but the Navy neither took over the ship nor commissioned her.

Information on West Cheswald's early career is lacking, but records of some of her movements and cargo are available. On 30 September 1920, West Cheswald took on a load of white sugar at Java and headed for the United States via the Suez Canal. While she was near Bermuda, West Cheswald was diverted from her original destination of New York to Philadelphia, to deliver her cargo in fulfillment of an order. Because the cargo had not been originally headed to Philadelphia, the purchasers refused to pay for it, believing that the voyage took too long. (Note: Another steamer, Washington Maru, routed to Philadelphia from Java left three days before West Cheswald and arrived two days after.) After litigation and various appeals, the case ended up before the Supreme Court of the United States in 1928 as Lamborn v. National Bank of Commerce, 276 U.S. 469 (1928). The court found that under the contract signed, the purchasers were obligated for the sugar regardless of whether or not the ship had originally been destined for Philadelphia. West Cheswald was also reported in Hawaiian service during 1920. The report of the Governor of Hawaii in the annual report of the United States Department of the Interior for the 1920–21 fiscal year, listed West Cheswald among the four USSB-owned ships sailed to Hawaii by the Pacific Steamship Company. (Note: West Hartland, Lake Elkwater, and Wawlona were the other three.)

A dispute over a load of sugar delivered to Philadelphia in 1920 by West Cheswald factored in a case that went before the Supreme Court of the United States in 1928.

From 1922, West Cheswald operated to South America, often bringing coffee to the United States. In October 1922, for example, she delivered 22,700 pounds (10,300 kg) of coffee from Rio de Janeiro to New Orleans, Louisiana, and in March 1923, she delivered 105,400 bags to New Orleans and another 4,100 bags to Galveston, Texas. From 1923 to 1940, little is known about West Cheswald's activities. At some point during this period, she was laid up in New Orleans as part of the reserve fleet located there.

== World War II ==
In June 1940, as World War II raged in Europe, the United States Maritime Commission (USMC) (a successor to the USSB) announced bidding for the reconditioning of West Cheswald and nine other ships that were in the reserve fleet. The low bid for West Cheswald was by the Maryland Drydock Company of Baltimore, which priced the repairs at $169,961. In February 1941, the USMC announced another round of bidding, this time for the operation of West Cheswald and three other ships on defense routes to southern and eastern Africa. The ships would carry defense cargo to African ports and return loads of chromium and manganese ore—both needed for the production of steel for armaments—to the United States. The American South African Line had the low bid for West Cheswald, offering to operate her for $17,174 monthly.

With her reconditioning complete, West Cheswald arrived in New York from Baltimore on 23 March. Although she may have been scheduled to begin her African service as early as 29 March, she sailed from New York on 11 April for the Cape Verde Islands, and from there, to Cape Town, where she arrived on 15 May. Beginning the next day, West Cheswald visited Port Elizabeth, East London, Durban, Mombasa, Tanga, and Zanzibar through 11 June. She returned to Tanga, then sailed from Dar es Salaam to Zanzibar and back on 23 and 24 June. She next made her way to Lourenço Marques, where she arrived on 3 July. From Lourenço Marques, she sailed back to Durban and Cape Town, before she began her transatlantic journey to Trinidad on 18 July. After calling at that Caribbean port, she returned to New York to complete her first circuit on 18 August.

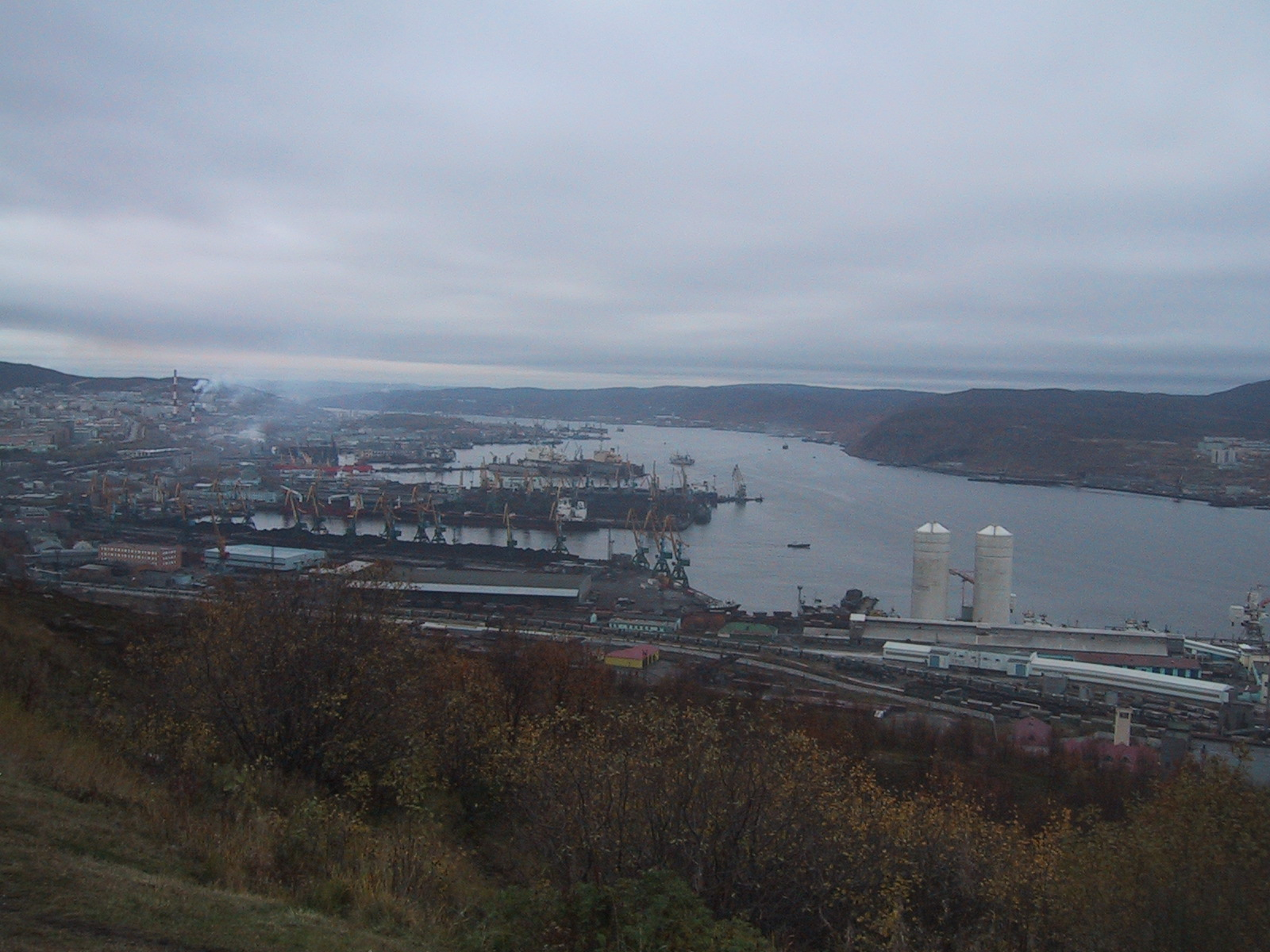
On 19 April 1942, West Cheswald's convoy arrived at the harbor of Murmansk (picture here in 2003) to deliver a cargo that included tanks.

On 6 September, West Cheswald began another, similar voyage to Africa. In addition to calling at many of the same ports she visited on her first trip, she visited the port of Beira, Mozambique for the first time in early November. The ship was in transit from Cape Town to Trinidad on 7 December during the Attack on Pearl Harbor, and by the time she arrived at Boston on 27 December, the United States had joined the Allies of World War II in declaring war against the Axis powers.

== Arctic convoy ==
West Cheswald sailed from Boston for New York on 30 December, and spent nearly eight weeks at New York. Outfitted with armament and a Naval Armed Guard detachment, she sailed from Boston for Halifax with a load of tanks on 23 February 1942. After spending five days at Halifax, she sailed as part of Convoy SC 72 to Clyde on 28 February. After arriving at Clyde on 17 March, West Cheswald made her way to Oban on 22 March and sailed four days later for Murmansk as part of Convoy PQ 14. The convoy consisted of approximately 25 merchant ships, ten of which were American, and of the American ships, only two—West Cheswald and Yaka—possessed defensive weaponry manned by Naval Armed Guardsmen. Many ships turned back because of heavy fog and snow; West Cheswald, Yaka and several other ships from the convoy remained at Reykjavík from 31 March to 8 April. On 15 April, the convoy was tracked by a German aircraft, and convoy escort ships made contact with three German destroyers. The following day, the convoy commodore's ship was sunk by a submarine; (Note: SS Empire Howard was sunk by German submarine U-408.) at least two other torpedoes traveled through the convoy without hitting any ships. The convoy came under air attack on 17 April, but suffered no losses. As the convoy neared Murmansk, two Soviet destroyers with air cover joined the escort, and the convoy arrived without further incident on 19 April.

Though the convoy had arrived at its destination, the danger of attack was still present. The nearest German airfield was 35 miles (56 km) away—about 7 to 10 minutes flying time—which gave almost no advance warning of air raids. German dive bombers would silently glide in below Soviet anti-aircraft fire, drop their bombs, and fly away. West Cheswald was luckier than some. Her closest call occurred when a bomb fell 50 feet (15 m) away from the ship during an air raid on 23 April, destroying a 50-ton crane that had earlier finished unloading the ship; West Cheswald suffered no major damage in any of the attacks. Despite the fact that Murmansk had limited port facilities and typically slow unloading of cargo, West Cheswald was ready to sail in the next departing convoy, Convoy QP 11, on 28 April. West Cheswald's armed guardsmen received a battle star for their participation in Convoy PQ 14.

== Later voyages ==
After returning to New York on 31 May by way of Reykjavík and Halifax, West Cheswald made a brief trip to Philadelphia and back before she worked her way down the East Coast to Norfolk, Virginia, where she arrived on 17 June. Sailing the next day, the cargo ship began the first of two African trips, during which she made many of the same ports as in her two 1941 voyages. On the homeward leg of her second voyage, she called at Takoradi and Freetown on the western coast of Africa in March 1943. After returning to the Americas, West Cheswald visited Saint Thomas, San Juan, and Mayagüez in the Caribbean before returning to Philadelphia on 28 April.

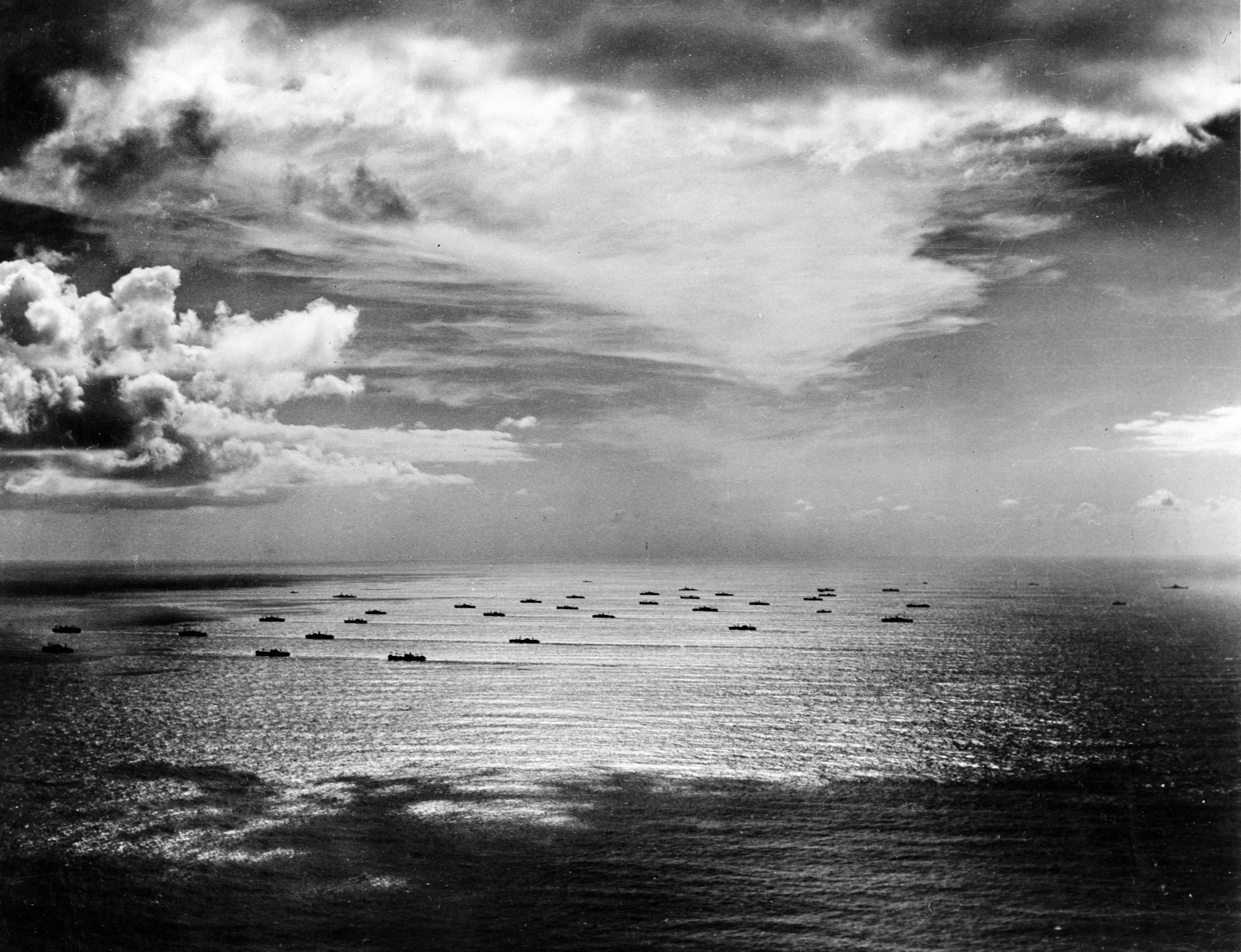
West Cheswald sailed in several transatlantic convoys, like this typical one, seen in 1942.

West Cheswald's next sailing began on 6 June, when she left Boston for Halifax, sailing from the latter port on 16 June in Convoy SC 134 bound for Liverpool. Breaking off from the convoy for Loch Ewe, West Cheswald also visited Methil, Southend, and Oban, before returning to New York on 11 August. Sailing from there on 6 September, she began her final trip to Africa, in which she visited the West African ports of Bathurst, Freetown, Monrovia, and Takoradi before returning to Philadelphia via Trinidad on 27 January 1944. She sailed from Philadelphia ten days later, ending up in Boston.

== Final voyage ==
West Cheswald had been selected to become one of the blockships for the Allied invasion of France, then in the planning stages. Though the specific modifications performed on West Cheswald are not revealed in sources, modifications for other ships do appear. In November 1944, The Christian Science Monitor reported that blockships dispatched from Boston, like West Cheswald, had been loaded with "tons of sand and cement" and had been rigged with explosive charges before departing the port. Further, existing anti-aircraft weapons had been moved higher up on the ship and supplemented by additional guns. An account by Cesar Poropat, chief engineer aboard West Honaker, another blockship dispatched from Boston, mentions that transverse bulkheads aboard that ship were cut open to facilitate sinking.

West Cheswald departed Boston on 10 March and arrived at Halifax two days later. Departing from that port on 29 March, she sailed in Convoy SC 156 and arrived at Swansea on 14 April. She departed there on 30 April for Oban, where she joined the assembling "Corncob Fleet." The Corncob Fleet was the group of ships to be sunk to form the "gooseberries", shallow-water artificial harbors for landing craft. Poropat reports that once the ship crews were told of their mission while anchored at Oban, they were not permitted to leave the ships. After five weeks of isolation at anchor, West Cheswald headed south for Poole, to join the first corncob convoy.

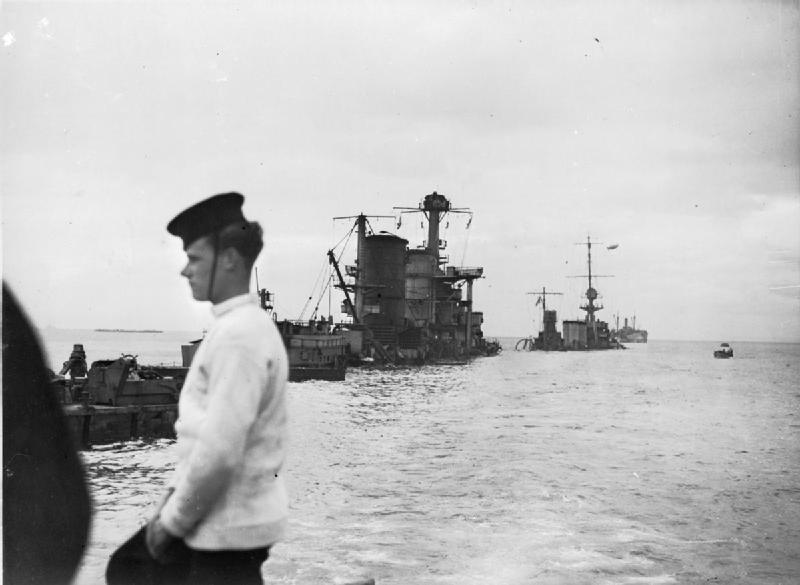
A view of the "gooseberry" breakwater at Sword Beach, showing the partially submerged ships. West Cheswald was scuttled to help form the "gooseberry" at Utah Beach shortly after the Normandy Landings in mid-June 1944.

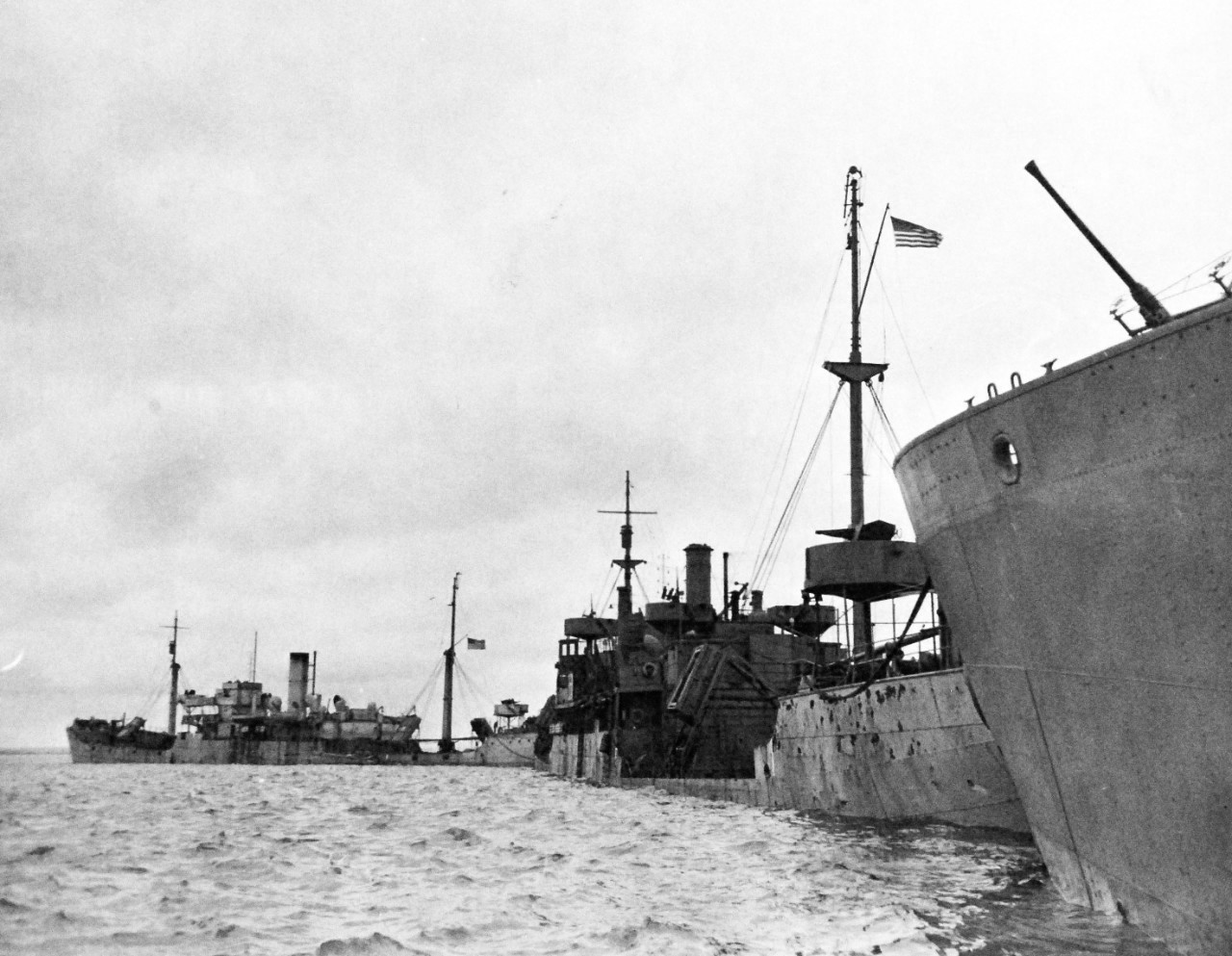
Gooseberry line of ship used as artificial harbour breakwater in June of 1944

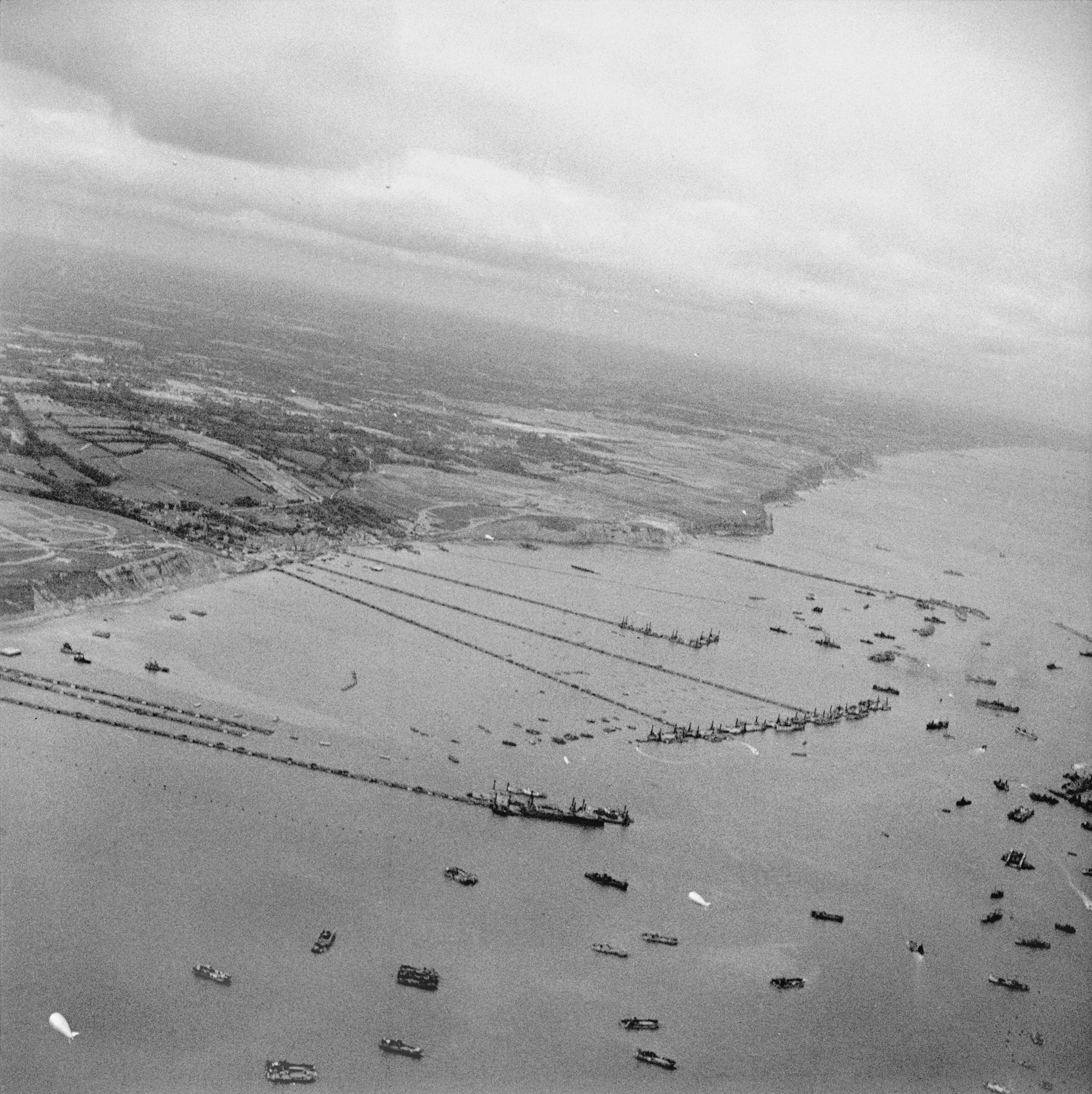
Mulberry artificial harbour in Normandy in September 1944, used to block the incoming wave

West Cheswald sailed from Poole on 7 June in a convoy, consisting of what one author called the "dregs of the North Atlantic shipping pool", and reached the Normandy beachhead the next day, two days after the D-Day landings. Poropat reports that the corncob ships traveled under cover of darkness and, stripped of all unnecessary equipment, carried no radios, having only a signal lamp (with a spare bulb) for communication. Once at the designated location, the ships were put into position and scuttled over the next days, under heavy German artillery fire. Naval Armed Guardsmen manned the guns on all the gooseberry ships to protect against frequent German air attacks; West Cheswald's gunners were credited with downing one plane on 10 June. All the while, harbor pilots—about half of the New York Bar Pilots Association, according to one source—carefully positioned the ships. West Cheswald and West Nohno were the last two ships sunk off Utah Beach when they went down on 11 June. Even though she had been sunk, West Cheswald continued to serve as an antiaircraft platform manned by Navy gun crews until 19 June, and by Army crews after that date. West Cheswald's naval gunners were awarded a second battle star for participation in the Normandy Landings.

== Bibliography ==
- Askew, William C.; Director of Naval History (1946). History of the Naval Armed Guard Afloat: World War II (OP-414). United States Naval Administration in World War II: Office of Naval Operations. Washington, D.C.: Navy Department.
- Cressman, Robert (2000). "Chapter V: 1943". The Official Chronology of the U.S. Navy in World War II. Annapolis, Maryland: Naval Institute Press. ISBN 978-1-55750-149-3. OCLC 41977179.
- Crowell, Benedict; Robert Forrest Wilson (1921). The Road to France: The Transportation of Troops and Military Supplies, 1917–1918. How America Went to War: An Account From Official Sources of the Nation's War Activities, 1917–1920. New Haven: Yale University Press. OCLC 18696066.
- Howe, Hartley E. (June 2004). "D-Day's Secret Weapons: Mullberries, Whales, Gooseberries, Phoenix, & Pluto". Sea Classics. Canoga Park, California: Challenge Publications. OCLC 60621086.
- Morison, Samuel Eliot (June 1975) [November 1947]. History of United States Naval Operations in World War II, Volume One: The Battle of the Atlantic, September 1939 – May 1943. Boston, Massachusetts: Little Brown. OCLC 7395406.
- Naval Historical Center. "West Cheswald". Dictionary of American Naval Fighting Ships. Navy Department, Naval History and Heritage Command.
- Richard, Dorothy Elizabeth; Office of Naval History (1947). Glossary of U.S. naval code words. Washington, D.C.: United States Government Printing Office. OCLC 51039630. Archived from the original on April 21, 1999.
- Stanford, Alfred (1951). Force Mulberry: The Planning and Installation of the Artificial Harbor Off U.S. Normandy Beaches in World War II. New York: Morrow. OCLC 576288.
- United States Department of the Interior (1921). "Report of the Governor of Hawaii". Reports of the Department of the Interior. Washington, D.C.: Government Printing Office. OCLC 5146707.
