= Cheryl Contee =

American businessperson and blogger

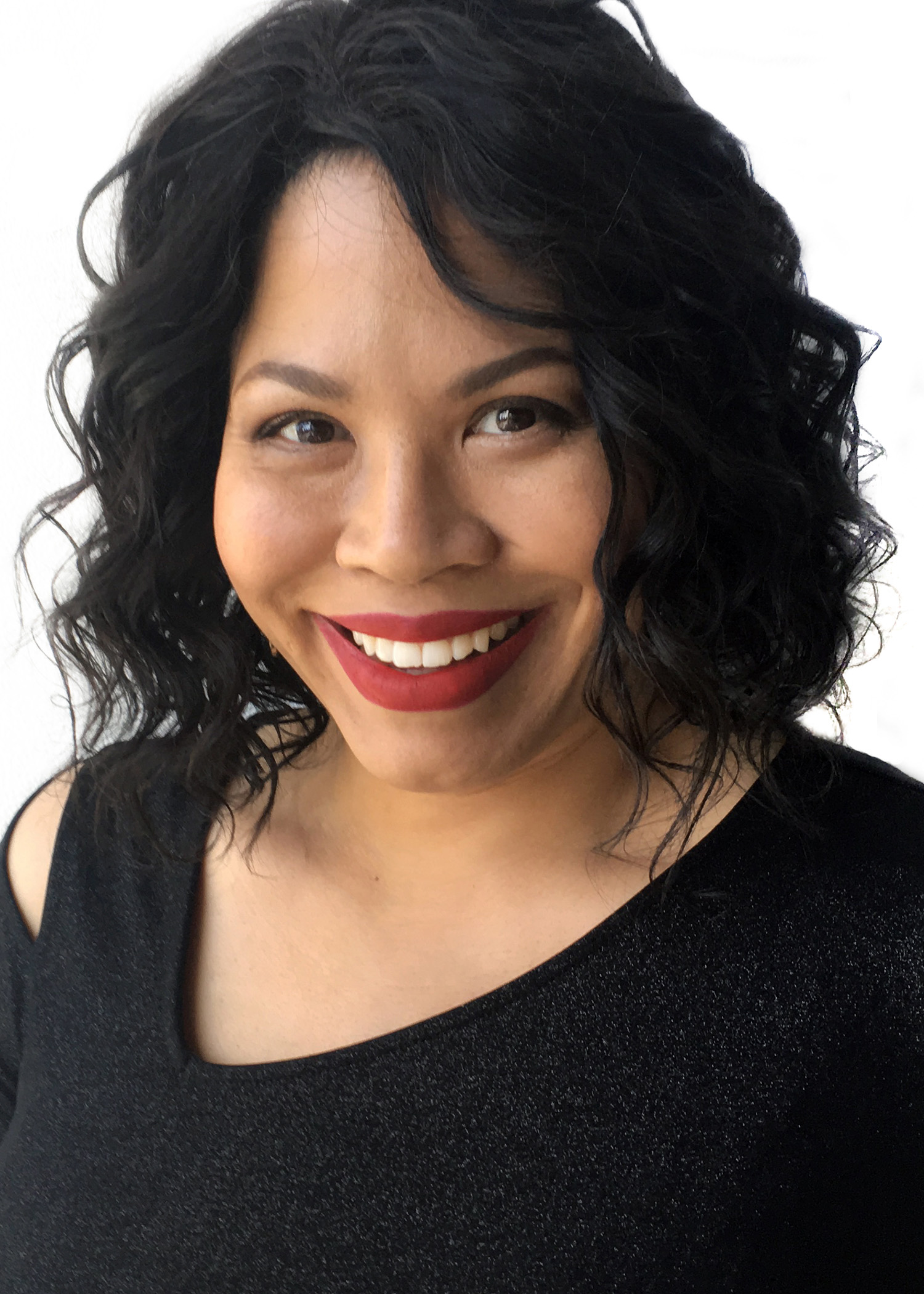
- Born: United States
- Occupations: Blogger, Writer, Entrepreneur

Cheryl Contee is an American entrepreneur, CEO, blogger, and writer. She is co-founder and CEO of a digital marketing agency, Do Big Things. Before founding Do Big Things, Contee co-founded Fission Strategy and Attentive.ly. In 2019, Contee released her book, “Mechanical Bull", which details her history as a non-traditional startup founder. She received her B.A. from Yale University and has an International Executive M.B.A. from Georgetown University.

== Entrepreneurship ==
In May 2008, Contee co-founded Fission Strategy, a women- and minority-owned tech startup. Fission was an Internet strategy and web development firm that specialized in nonprofits and foundations. In 2006, Contee also co-founded Jack and Jill Politics, named one of the top 10 black blogs in 2008, where she wrote under the pseudonym "Jill Tubman”.

In June 2012, Contee went on to co-found Attentive.ly, a tech startup specializing in influencer marketing technology, serving as their Strategic Advisor. In 2016, Attentive.ly was acquired by Blackbaud for $ 4 million, making it the first tech startup with a black female founder on board in history to be acquired by a NASDAQ-traded company.

In 2018, Fission Strategy merged with 270 Strategies, a digital consulting firm, to create Do Big Things, where she currently leads as the CEO. Do Big Things is a mission-driven digital marketing agency that specializes in working with non-profits and progressive political campaigns. In 2019, Contee released her book, “Mechanical Bull: How You Can Achieve Startup Success", which details her history as a rare Black female startup founder.

In addition to her business ventures, Contee co-founded #YesWeCode, now DreamCorps Tech, which represents the movement to help over 100,000 low opportunity youth to become high quality coders.

== Recognition ==
Contee was included in the first "The Root 100" list of established and emerging African-American leaders. Huffington Post listed her as one of the "Top 27 Female Founders in Tech to Follow on Twitter" in 2011, as did Black Enterprise. Fast Company named her one of their "2010 Most Influential Women in Tech". Contee was also named in "The Influencers 50" in Campaigns and Elections magazine. In 2019, Kate Spade NY and Conscious Company named Contee one of 2019’s “World Changing Women”.

== Media and board appearances ==
Contee's work has been published or featured by media including NPR’s How I Built This Resilience Series, The Washington Post, The New York Times, San Francisco Magazine, BBC, MSNBC and CNN, HuffPost Live, Social Venture Circle, Silicon Republic, Stanford Social Innovation Review, Harvard Business Review, and MarketWatch/Dow Jones.

She is also on several boards and advisory committees, including Netroots Nation, CovidMD.org, Hopewell Fund, Center for Cultural Power, and Digital Undivided. She has been an affiliate of the Harvard Berkman Center for Internet and Society.
