= MS West Honaker =

American diesel-powered cargo ship

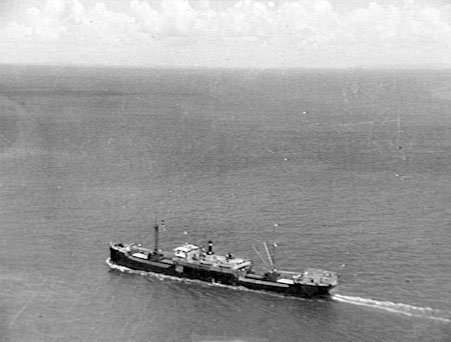
- MS West Honaker seen from the air shortly before arrival at Brisbane on 13 December 1940.

History

United States
- Name: West Honaker
- Owner: USSB
- Builder: Los Angeles Shipbuilding & Dry Dock Co.; San Pedro, California
- Yard number: 28
- Completed: December 1920
- Identification: Official number: 220842
- Fate: Sunk as part of "gooseberry" breakwater off Normandy, 8 June 1944

General characteristics
- Type: Design 1013 ship
- Tonnage: 5,376 GRT
- Length: 410 ft 1 in (124.99 m) (LPP); 423 ft (129 m)
- Beam: 54 ft 2 in (16.51 m)
- Draft: 23 ft 11 in (7.29 m)
- Depth: 27 ft 2 in (8.28 m)
- Propulsion: as built: 1 × triple-expansion steam engine; 1926: 1 × 6-cylinder diesel engine, 3,000 hp (2,200 kW)
- Speed: 11.5 knots (21.3 km/h)
- Range: as built: 7,300 nautical miles (13,500 km); 1926: 17,600 nautical miles (32,600 km)
- Capacity: 1926: 8,006 DWT; 3,343 net register tons (NRT); 393,000 cu ft (11,100 m^{3}); 14 passengers

MS West Honaker was a diesel-powered cargo ship of the United States Maritime Commission (USMC) that was part of the "Corncob Fleet" of old ships sunk as part of the "gooseberry" breakwater off Utah Beach during the Normandy invasion. The ship was originally built as SS West Honaker, a steam-powered cargo ship built for the United States Shipping Board (USSB), a predecessor of the USMC. At the time of her completion in 1920, the ship was inspected by the United States Navy for possible use as USS West Honaker (ID-4455) but was neither taken into the Navy nor ever commissioned under that name.

West Honaker was built in 1920 for the USSB, as a part of the West boats, a series of steel-hulled cargo ships built on the West Coast of the United States for the World War I war effort, and was the 28th ship built at Los Angeles Shipbuilding & Dry Dock Company in San Pedro, California. In 1926, West Honaker was outfitted with diesel engines that replaced her original steam engines as part of a pilot program by the USSB. After her conversion, she sailed on a New York – Australia route. On her second trip to Australia, from August 1927 to March 1928, she became the first diesel ship to circumnavigate the globe. In 1929, she began sailing for an around-the-world cargo service from the Pacific coast to South Africa

By the late 1930s, she had been laid up, but was reactivated for merchant service prior to World War II. She sailed to Australia and New Zealand until after the United States' entry into World War II, and in transatlantic service to the United Kingdom for most of the time after that. In March 1944, she sailed from the United States for the final time, and was incorporated into the Corncob Fleet of old ships scuttled in June to make the "gooseberry" breakwater off Utah Beach during the Normandy invasion. This last voyage earned the West Honaker a battle star.

== Design and construction ==
The West ships were cargo ships of similar size and design built by several shipyards on the West Coast of the United States for the USSB for emergency use during World War I. All were given names that began with the word West, like West Honaker, the one of some 40 West ships built by the Los Angeles Shipbuilding & Dry Dock Company of Los Angeles. West Honaker (Los Angeles Shipbuilding yard number 28) was completed in December 1920.

West Honaker was 5,376 gross register tons (GRT), and was 410 feet 1 inch (124.99 m) long (between perpendiculars) and 54 feet 2 inches (16.51 m) abeam. She had a steel hull and a deadweight tonnage of 8,006 DWT. Sources do not give West Honaker's other hull characteristics, but West Grama, a sister ship also built at Los Angeles Shipbuilding had a displacement of 12,225 t with a mean draft of 24 feet 2 inches (7.37 m), and a hold 29 feet 9 inches (9.07 m) deep. West Honaker's power plant was a single triple-expansion steam engine that drove a single screw propeller, which moved the ship at up to 11.5 knots (21.3 km/h).

== Early career ==
West Honaker was inspected by the United States Navy after completion for possible use as service collier and was assigned the identification number of 4455. Had she been commissioned, she would have been known as USS West Honaker (ID-4455), but the Navy neither took over the ship nor commissioned her.

Destinations and cargo during West Honaker's first six years of service are largely unreported in sources. In 1926, however, she was the first ship in a USSB pilot program to replace steam engines of seven USSB-owned ships with diesel engines. West Honaker's 3,000-horsepower (2,200 kW) engine, reported by The Washington Post as the largest American-made diesel equipment to that time, was built by McIntosh & Seymour and installed at the Fore River Shipyard near Boston. An Associated Press news item reported that the ship's $1,000,000 conversion, which extended the ship's cruising radius from 7,300 nautical miles (13,500 km) to 17,600 nautical miles (32,600 km), would lower her cost of operation by 15% annually. After her sea trials were complete, West Honaker sailed to Savannah, Georgia, where she began carrying cotton from that port to Bremen.

In January 1927, the USSB established the Atlantic Australian Line, an all-diesel New York – Australia service, and assigned West Honaker to the company. The eight ships in the service—operated by the Roosevelt Steamship Company in conjunction with another USSB-line, the American India Line—sailed east from New York via the Suez Canal through the Indian Ocean and on to Australia and back via the same route. (Note: The seven other ships were Sawokla, City of Rayville, City of Dalhart, Unicoi, Tampa, Crown City, and West Cusseta, the latter two Los Angeles-built sister ships of West Honaker.) On 15 February, West Honaker sailed on her maiden voyage for the new service for Sydney, where she arrived on 5 April.

On 26 August, she began her second voyage to Sydney, but instead of retracing her route on the return, she continued eastward around the world, becoming—according to The New York Times—the first diesel ship to circumnavigate the globe. Upon her return to New York on 2 March 1928, a reception was held at the Tompkinsville, Staten Island, pier where she had docked. The Roosevelt Steamship Company announced plans for West Honaker to continue in around-the-world service, making two voyages per year.

== South African service ==
In February 1929, West Honaker was bareboat chartered by the USSB for the new Pacific–South Africa Line, (Note: In sources the service was referred to as both the Pacific–South Africa Line and the South African Dispatch Line.) an around-the-world venture under the management of J. J. Moore & Company. (Note: West Cusseta, Crown City, and West Grama (another Los Angeles-built sister ship) were also assigned to the new service.) The Pacific–South Africa Line service—the world's only all-diesel around-the-world service, as described by the Los Angeles Times—sailed from Los Angeles to South Africa via the Straits of Magellan, across the Indian Ocean to Japan and China, across the Pacific to San Francisco, and back to Los Angeles. West Honaker's first voyage in the South African service was planned for November, but upon her arrival from New York to begin the service, (Note: West Honaker had continued sailing from New York for the Roosevelt Company through October. See, for example: "Shipping and mails". The New York Times. 25 March 1929. p. 51.) it was discovered that she had cracks in her engine mountings and her cylinder head. West Honaker made her way to San Francisco, where parts were fabricated for the $100,000 repair. This kept her out of service until March 1930.

West Honaker departed on her long-delayed maiden voyage for the Pacific–South Africa Line in mid March, and began a second voyage for the line in late October. West Honaker's service continued uneventfully until early 1932. On 2 March of that year, West Honaker collided with steamer Ernest H. Meyer in a snowstorm on the lower Columbia River, near Astoria, Oregon. Both ships suffered damage, but neither needed assistance to reach Portland. West Honaker had just finished undergoing general repairs in drydock in Portland prior to the collision, which caused about $30,000 in damages. The USSB filed suit against the Portland Steamship Company for the cost of repairs, which were completed by mid March.

In mid-June, the bareboat charters of the three USSB vessels still sailing for Pacific–South Africa—West Honaker, West Cusseta, and Crown City—were cancelled. At the end of each ship's voyage in progress, the ships were returned to the USSB. At the time of the announcement, West Honaker was in South African waters. The Los Angeles Times reported that preferential tariffs for British-flagged ships for lumber from British Columbia—a major cargo carried by the line—were responsible for the termination. It's not known when West Honaker completed her final trip, but in late June she was still shown in South Africa by a notice in The New York Times. After this mention, West Honaker disappears from contemporary news accounts. By 1939, West Honaker had been laid up in a reserve fleet in the James River.

== World War II ==
In June 1940, the USMC opened bidding for the reconditioning of ten laid up cargo ships, which included West Honaker. According to the Los Angeles Times, the USMC, a successor to the USSB, was forced to act because of a "critical shortage" of U.S. Navy auxiliary ships. The Maryland Drydock Company of Baltimore was the low bidder for West Honaker, offering to recondition her for $77,777.

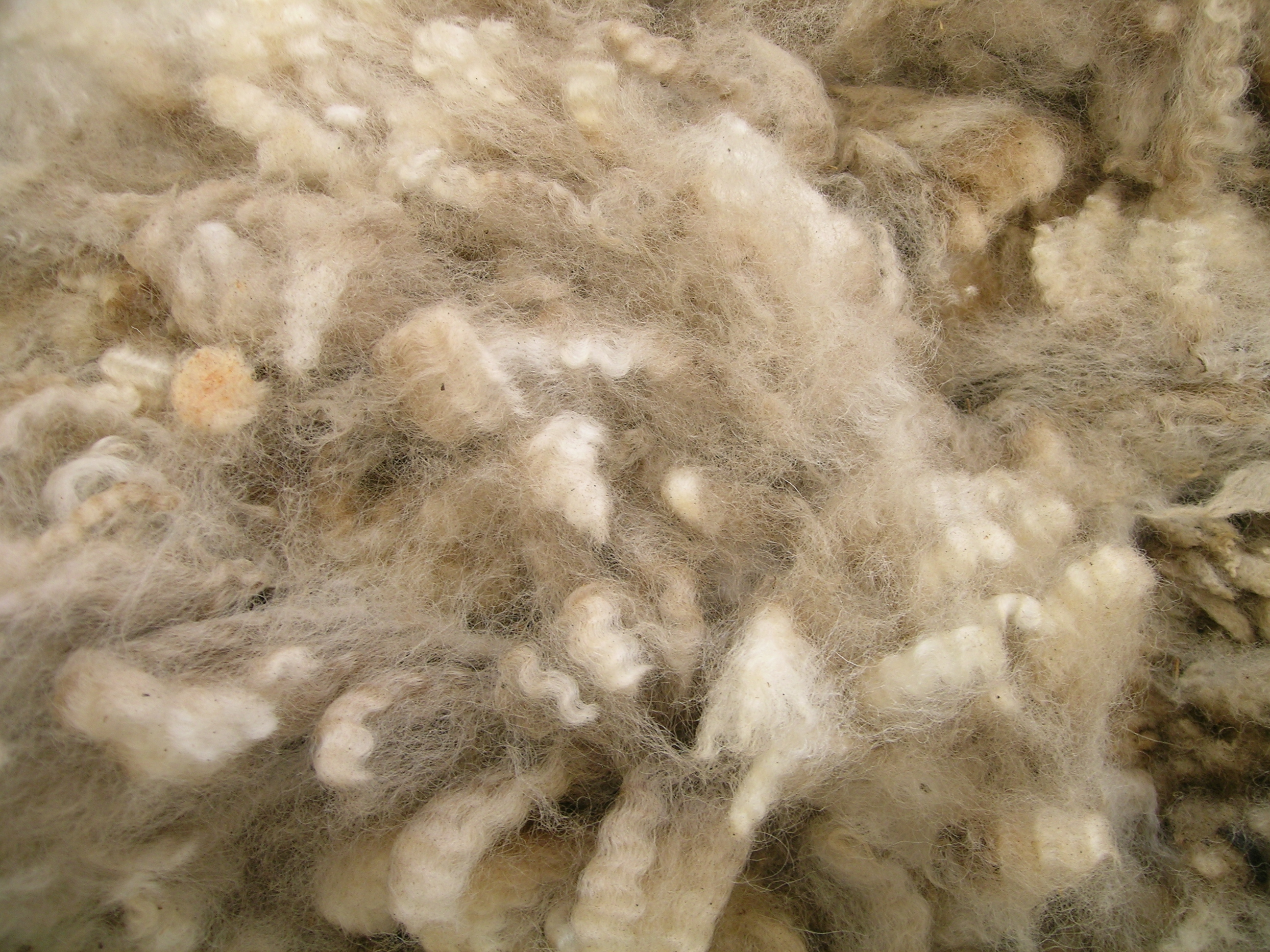
West Honaker carried a load of wool (pictured) from Australia to New Bedford, Massachusetts, in late 1940 for American military use.

On 3 November, with her reconditioning complete, West Honaker sailed from New York. After transiting the Panama Canal a week after her departure, she headed for Brisbane, Australia, where she arrived on 13 December. After then calling at Sydney, Melbourne, Port Pirie, and Adelaide through 8 January 1941, West Honaker called at Melbourne and Sydney before departing for the United States on 18 January. Loaded with a cargo of wool intended for uniforms, blankets, and overcoats for the military, West Honaker arrived at New Bedford, Massachusetts, on 3 March.

From late March to mid August, West Honaker made another, almost identical Australian circuit, adding a stop in Fremantle to her Australian itinerary. Almost immediately after her return to Boston, she began a third trip to Australia. After she arrived in Brisbane on 29 October, she made stops in Sydney and Melbourne. From Sydney she made a round trip to Nouméa, New Caledonia, and sailed from there to Wellington, New Zealand, where she arrived on 11 December, four days after the Japanese Attack on Pearl Harbor that propelled the United States into World War II.

West Honaker departed Wellington on 13 December and arrived at Boston on 28 February 1942. From Boston, she sailed to New York via Philadelphia. After sailing from New York on 29 April, West Honaker experienced some unspecified trouble, and was towed into Baltimore on 4 June. After spending almost three weeks in that port, she headed for Cape Town via Trinidad. She departed Cape Town on 24 August and sailed to Bushire, Abadan, Bandar Abbas, and Colombo over the next three months. After making a round trip to Calcutta from late November to late December, West Honaker arrived at Wellington on 26 January, sailing for New York via the Panama Canal three days later.

West Honaker took on a load of grain and then proceeded in convoy from Boston to Halifax in early May, and on to Belfast Lough. After making a circuit to Avonmouth and Milford Haven, West Honaker sailed from Belfast Lough for New York on 25 June. She made one additional transatlantic roundtrip beginning in late August, carrying a cargo of explosives on her outbound trip, and returning in late October. West Honaker sailed 28 November from New York for Nuevitas, Cuba, and returned via Key West, Florida, in late December. Sailing again for the Caribbean on 6 February, she visited Guantánamo Bay and Antilla before her 28 February 1944 return to New York. At some point within the next month, West Honaker arrived at Boston.

== Final voyage ==
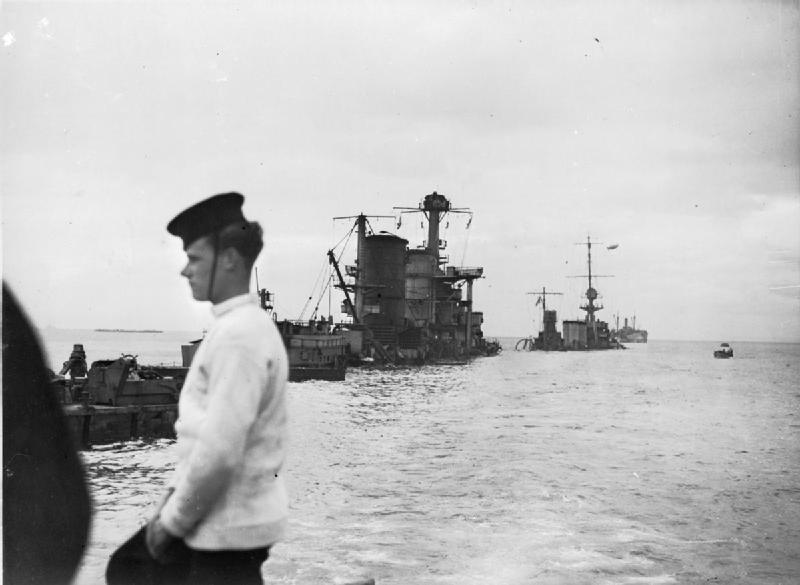
A view of the "gooseberry" breakwater at Sword Beach, showing the partially submerged ships. West Honaker was scuttled to help form the "gooseberry" at Utah Beach on 10 June 1944, two days after the Normandy Landings.

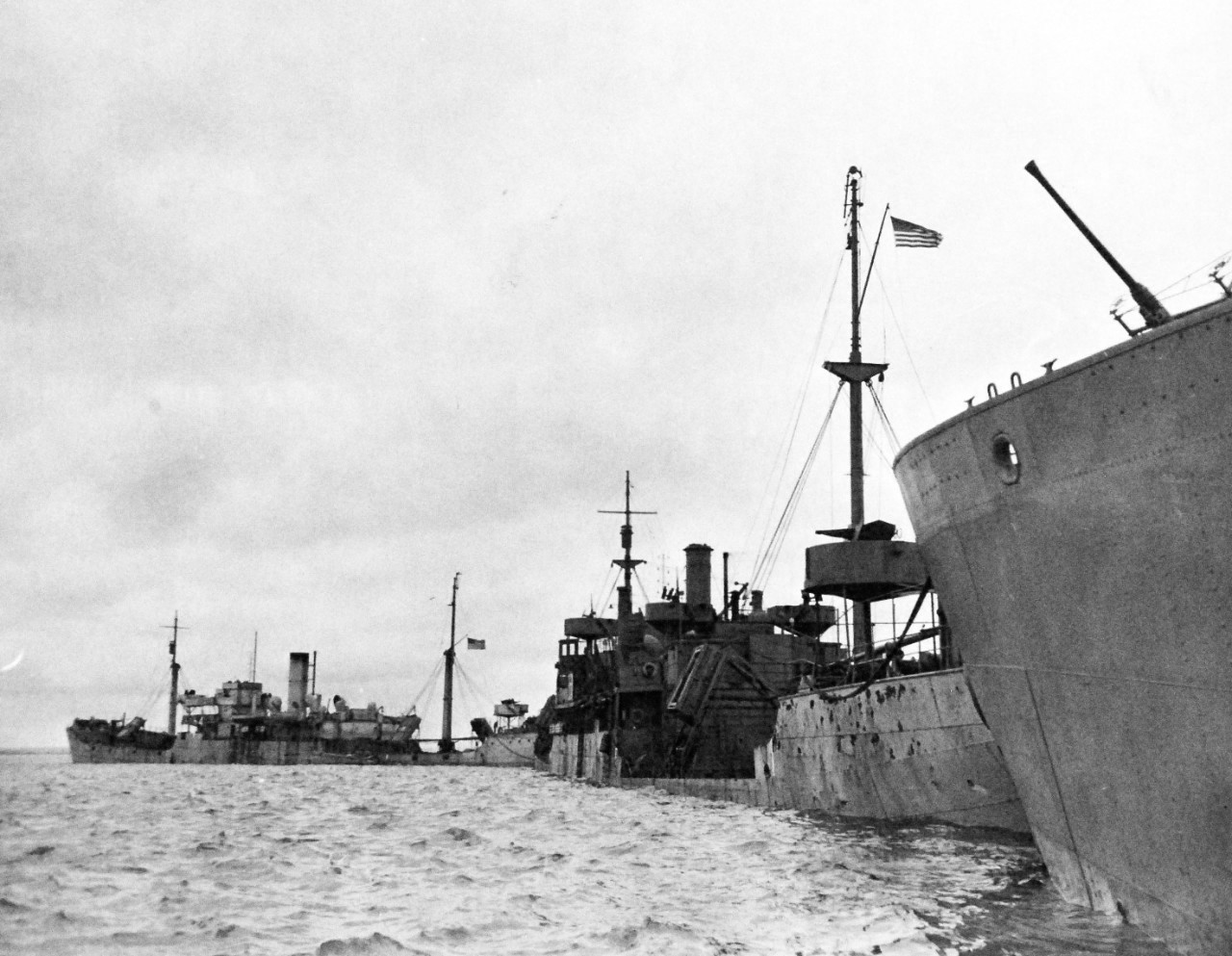
Gooseberry line of ship used as artificial harbour breakwater in June 1944

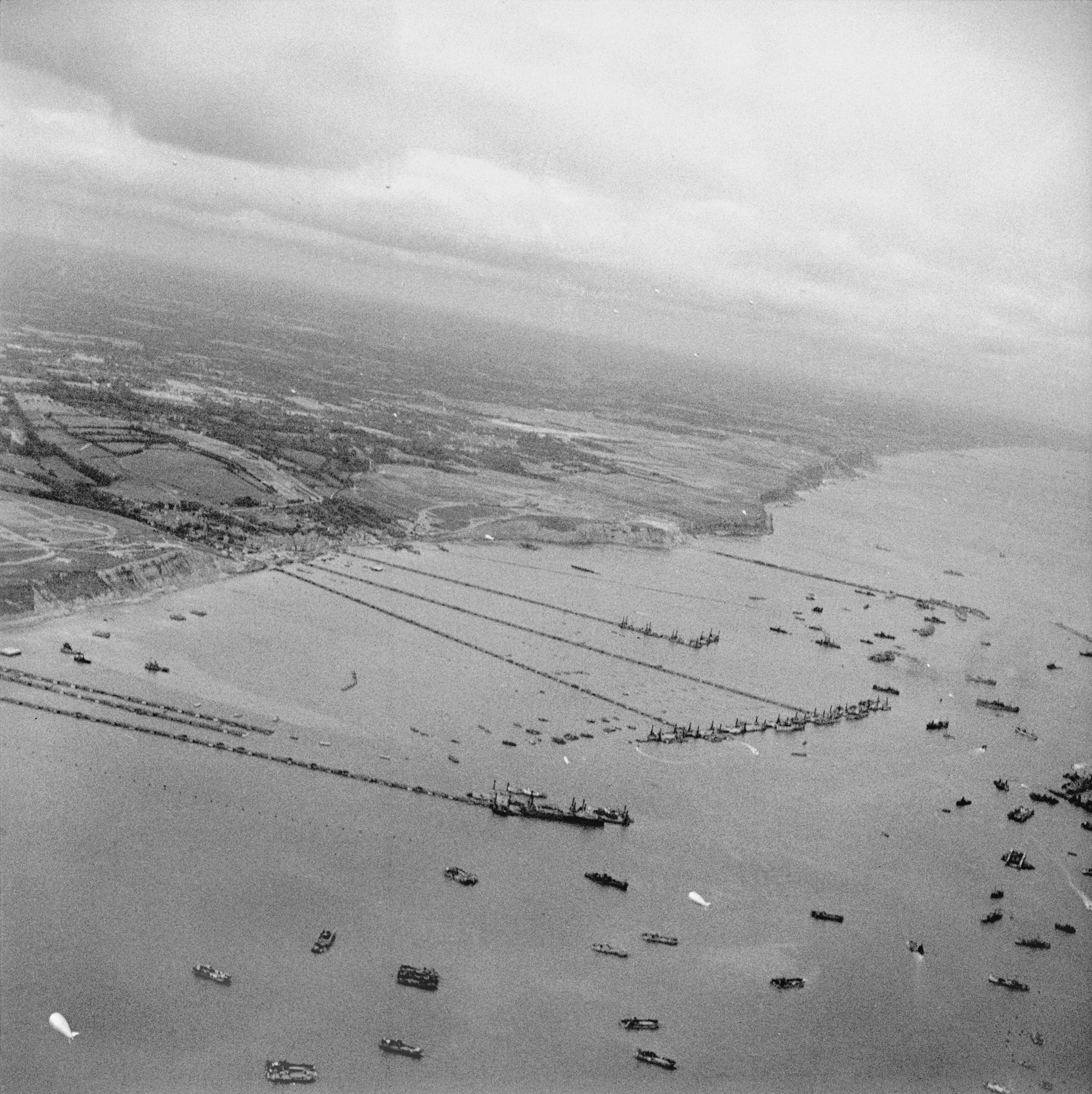
Mulberry artificial harbour in Normandy in September 1944, used to block the incoming wave

Though her crew did not know it at the time, West Honaker had been selected to be one of the blockships for the Allied invasion of France, then in the planning stages. Blockships dispatched from Boston, like West Honaker, were loaded with "tons of sand and cement" before their final U.S. departures. West Honaker sailed from Boston on 25 March 1944 as a part of Convoy BX-101 to Halifax and, from there, Convoy SC 156 to Cardiff. In his book Beyond the Palisades, Cesar Poropat, West Honaker's chief engineer, reports that after the ship's cargo was discharged, the ship was suddenly boarded by shipyard workers who cut holes in "strategic places" and positioned "mysterious packs" around the hull. The crew suspected, correctly, that these packs were explosives and that the ship was being prepared for sinking. Though there is no specific mention of this occurring on West Honaker, other blockships selected for the Normandy beachhead had their existing antiaircraft weapons moved higher on the ship and supplemented by additional guns.

Poropat recounts that after the shipyard workers departed, the crew were told to pack all their personal belongings—except for toiletries and one change of clothes—to be sent ashore. Each crewman was issued a backpack with K-rations, a special life preserver, and survival equipment. West Honaker departed Cardiff on 24 April for Oban where she arrived on 5 May. She was now a part of the "Corncob Fleet," the group of ships to be sunk to form the "gooseberries," shallow-water artificial harbors for landing craft. Once at Oban, Poropat reports that the ship's crew was told of their mission, but to preserve secrecy, they were not permitted to leave the ships.

After spending five weeks at Oban—Poropat called it "the longest and most tedious five weeks" of his life—West Honaker finally moved out, sailing south through the Irish Sea to Poole. West Honaker was a part of the third "Corncob" convoy, which sailed from Poole on the night on 7 June, the day after the D-Day landings, and consisted of what one author called the "dregs of the North Atlantic shipping pool." Poropat relates that the Corncob ships crossed the English Channel under cover of darkness and, stripped of all unnecessary equipment, carried no radios, having only a signal lamp (with a spare bulb) for communication.

Around midnight 7/8 June, during the slow voyage across the Channel, a German airplane hit West Honaker with two skip bombs. Because the ship, already prepared for a fast sinking for the blockship duties, began taking on water, a large portion of the crew, including Chief Engineer Poropat, abandoned ship. After drifting in the Channel for most of the rest of the moonless night, they were picked up in the morning by a British trawler and returned to the UK. In the meantime, the master of the ship was able to keep West Honaker in the convoy headed to Utah beach.

Once at the designated location, the ships were positioned and scuttled over the next days, under heavy German artillery fire. Naval Armed Guardsmen manned the guns on all the gooseberry ships to protect against frequent German air attacks. All the while, harbor pilots—about half of the New York Bar Pilots Association, according to one source—carefully positioned the ships. West Honaker was sunk on 10 June about 400 yards (370 m) off the beach, but continued to serve as an antiaircraft platform manned by Navy gun crews until 14 June, and by Army crews after that date. West Honaker's naval gunners were awarded a battle star for participation in the Normandy Landings.

== Bibliography ==
- Askew, William C.; Director of Naval History (1946). History of the Naval Armed Guard Afloat: World War II (OP-414). United States Naval Administration in World War II: Office of Naval Operations. Washington, D.C.: Navy Department.
- Crowell, Benedict; Robert Forrest Wilson (1921). The Road to France: The Transportation of Troops and Military Supplies, 1917–1918. How America Went to War: An Account From Official Sources of the Nation's War Activities, 1917–1920. New Haven: Yale University Press. OCLC 18696066.
- Howe, Hartley E. (June 2004). "D-Day's Secret Weapons: Mullberries, Whales, Gooseberries, Phoenix, & Pluto". Sea Classics. Canoga Park, California: Challenge Publications. OCLC 60621086.
- Jordan, Roger W. (2006) [1999]. The World's Merchant Fleets, 1939: The Particulars And Wartime Fates of 6,000 Ships. Annapolis, Maryland: Naval Institute Press. ISBN 978-1-59114-959-0. OCLC 150361480.
- Naval Historical Center. "West Grama". Dictionary of American Naval Fighting Ships. Navy Department, Naval History and Heritage Command.
- Naval Historical Center. "West Honaker". Dictionary of American Naval Fighting Ships. Navy Department, Naval History & Heritage Command.
- Richard, Dorothy Elizabeth; Office of Naval History (1947). Glossary of U.S. naval code words. Washington, D.C.: United States Government Printing Office. OCLC 51039630. Archived from the original on 2011-09-20.
