= John Webster (governor) =

Governor of the Colony of Connecticut in 1656

Governor of the Colony of Connecticut
- In office 1656–1657
- Preceded by: Thomas Welles
- Succeeded by: John Winthrop Jr.

Deputy Governor of the Colony of Connecticut
- In office 1655–1655
- Preceded by: Thomas Welles
- Succeeded by: Thomas Welles

Personal details
- Born: bef. August 16, 1590 Cossington, Leicestershire, England
- Died: April 5, 1661 (aged 70) Hadley, Massachusetts Bay Colony
- Spouse: Agnes Smith (m. 1609)
- Children: 9

John Webster (bef August 16, 1590 – April 5, 1661) was an early colonial settler of New England, serving one term as governor of the Colony of Connecticut in 1656.

== Early life ==
Webster was born in Cossington, Leicestershire, England, the son of Matthew Webster and his wife, Elizabeth Ashton.

== Career ==
In the early 1630s, he traveled to the Massachusetts Bay Colony with his wife and five children, settling in the area of Newtowne (now Cambridge, Massachusetts). He left in 1636, in all probability with Thomas Hooker and his adherents, to settle Hartford, Connecticut. His first public office was as a member of a committee that joined with the Court of Magistrates in determining the course of war with the Pequot Indians. He was chosen from 1639 to 1655 to be magistrate, and in 1655 he was chosen as Deputy Governor of the Colony of Connecticut. In 1656 he was elected governor, and he served as first magistrate from 1657 to 1659.

In addition to his service as Governor of the Connecticut Colony, John Webster was one of the nineteen men representing the towns of Hartford, Wethersfield, and Windsor in 1638-39 who participated in the drafting and adoption of the Fundamental Orders of Connecticut, a document that is widely acknowledged as establishing one of the earliest forms of constitutional government.

=== Communion controversy ===
A split amongst the church members in Hartford grew when the current minister at the First Church in Hartford, Samuel Stone, declared that the requirement that stated only parents that had both taken communion should be allowed to have a child baptized would be removed, and non-communicants would be allowed to vote. John Webster, among others, were a part of a council that agreed that this was not acceptable. Reverend Stone chose to ignore this sentiment, and the issue was taken up with the General Court in Massachusetts. The Court ruled that although Reverend Stone had been too strict in ignoring the majority of his parishioners, he was right in liberalizing the baptism ritual. It was also found that those who disagreed with Stone could remove themselves to a location in Massachusetts to practice how they saw fit. This eventual location chosen was Hadley, Massechusetts, and in 1659, a new community was built there. Webster lived there for less than two years, for in 1661 he contracted a fever and died.

== Personal life ==
Coat of Arms of John Webster

On November 7, 1609, Webster married Agnes Smith (born August 29, 1585 in Cossington, Leicestershire, England) at Cossington. She died in Hadley, Massachusetts in 1667. They had nine children (all born in England):

- Matthew Webster (1609–1675), who married Sarah Waterbury and Mary Reeve
- Margaret Webster (b. 1610/11), who married William Bolton and Thomas Hunt
- William Webster (1614–1688), who married Mary Reeve (1617–1698) ("Half-Hanged Mary": accused witch who survived being hanged in 1683)
- Thomas Webster (1616–1686), who married Abigail Sage Alexander (1647–1688)
- Robert Webster (1619–1676), who married Susanna Treat (1629–1705)
- Anne Webster (1621–1662), who married John Marsh (1618–1688)
- Elizabeth Webster (1622/24–1688), who married William Markham (1621–1690)
- Mary Webster (b. 1623), who likely died before April 15, 1623
- Faith Webster (1627–1627), who died 10 days after her birth

== Notable descendants ==
- William Robbins Barnes (1866-1945) - co-founder of Barnes and Noble
- Pat Bagley (1956-) - editorial cartoonist
- Will Bagley (1950-2021) - historian of western America
- Earl W. Bascom (1906-1995) - rodeo pioneer, inventor, cowboy hall of fame inductee, Hollywood actor, western artist and sculptor, "father of modern rodeo"
- George H. W. Bush (1924-2018) - 41st President of the United States
- George W. Bush (1946- ) - 43rd President of the United States
- Richard Bushman (1931- ) - American historian and college professor
- Clara C. M. Cannon (1839-1926) - California pioneer, early leader of Children's Primary
- Johnny Carson (1925-2005) American television celebrity
- Tom C. Clark (1899-1977) - Associate Justice of the U.S. Supreme Court
- Samuel Colt (1814-1862) - American inventor, founder of Colt firearms
- Emily Dickinson (1830-1886) - American poet
- William Faulkner (1897-1962) - American writer and Nobel Prize Laureate
- James E. Faust (1920-2007) - World War II air corp veteran, attorney, politician, religious leader, published author
- Marion D. Hanks (1921-2011) - World War II navy chaplain, religious leader, seminary teacher, author, public speaker, poet, business executive
- John Marshall Harlan II (1899-1971) - Associate Justice of the U.S. Supreme Court
- Franklin S. Harris (1884-1966) - Brigham Young University president, published author
- Rutherford B. Hayes (1822-1893) - 19th President of the United States
- Katharine Hepburn (1907-2003) - American actress
- Henry Hubbard (1784-1857) - 26th Governor of New Hampshire
- Jared Ingersoll (1749-1822) - signer of the Declaration of Independence
- Janis Joplin (1943-1970) - American rock and blues singer
- W. W. Keeler (1908-1987) - President of Phillips Petroleum Company, Chief of the Cherokee Nation
- John Davis Lodge (1903-1985) - 79th Governor of Connecticut
- Francis M. Lyman (1840-1916)) - American politician, attorney, religious leader
- Truman G. Madsen (1926-2009) - university professor, published author, world lecturer, film producer, editor
- Thomas B. Marsh (1800-1866) - American religious leader
- Rachel Scott (1981-1999) - American student, Columbine High School massacre victim
- Reed Smoot (1862-1941) - religious leader, United States Senator
- Jonathan Strong (1944 - ) - American novelist
- T. Michael Twomey (1965 - ) - Attorney and Corporate Officer with Entergy Corporation
- Henry Kitchell Webster (1875-1932) - American novelist
- James G. Webster (1951 - ) - professor at Northwestern University
- Noah Webster, Jr. (1758-1843) - American lexicographer, textbook pioneer, English-language spelling reformer, political writer, editor, and prolific author
- Maurice H. Webster (1892-1982) - Chicago architect
- Stokely Webster (1912-2001) - American impressionist painter
- Towner K. Webster (1849-1922) - American industrialist
- Daniel H. Wells (1814-1891), Justice of the Peace in Nauvoo, Illinois and Lt. General of the Nauvoo Legion, mayor of Salt Lake City, Utah
- Heber M. Wells (1859-1938), first governor of Utah
- Briant H. Wells (1871-1949), Major General of U.S. army
- Annie Wells Cannon (1859-1942), women's suffragist, Utah State Legislator
- Cavendish W. Cannon (1895-1962), US Ambassador to Greece, Morocco, Syria and Portugal
- Rulon S. Wells (1854-1941), Utah State Legislator, religious leader
- Orson F. Whitney (1855-1931) - politician, journalist, poet, college professor, historian, religious leader
- Ronald C. Lindquist (1946 - ) - Sales & Marketing Executive, brought EpiPen to the market.

Political offices
| Preceded by Thomas Welles | Governor of the Colony of Connecticut; 1656–1657 | Succeeded by John Winthrop Jr. |
