= Maurice H. Webster =

American architect

Maurice H. Webster was an American Chicago area architect who designed private homes and public buildings in Chicago, including the award-winning Chess Pavilion on the city's lakefront.

== Personal life ==
Webster was born September 20, 1892, in Evanston, Illinois, the youngest child of Chicago industrialist Towner K. Webster and Emma Josephine Kitchell. His older brother was author Henry Kitchell Webster. Maurice was trained as an architect at Cornell University in Ithaca, New York. In 1916 he was licensed to practice in Illinois.

His first commission was to build a summer home for his father. Bee Tree Farm, in Oregon Illinois, was completed in 1917. It was a wood-frame house with a great room and a large screened-in porch overlooking a pool and pastureland beyond. Some years later, his nephew, the noted artist Stokely Webster, described the Bee Tree as a “magical place” that shaped his style of painting. Maurice Webster went on to have a long career designing a public buildings and private homes in a variety of architectural styles. Among his projects, Webster would build an airport, a castle, a stadium and field house, and Chicago's Chess Pavilion. He died on May 17, 1982, in Evanston.

== Sky Harbor ==
Webster went into partnership with architect Alfred P. Allen. In 1929 they designed the Club House at Sky Harbor Airport in Northbrook Illinois, a suburb north of Chicago. The United Aviation Corporation conceived of Sky Harbor as an “aviation country club,” and spent an unheard of $500,000 on its construction. The central feature and public face of the airport was the Club House. The Chicago Tribune described it as the “latest thing in modernistic architecture and also reminiscent of ancient Aztec buildings.” It had a large square base with each succeeding floor stepping back to form a central tower. The first floor contained a waiting room and public facilities. The second floor housed a restaurant and nightclub. The third floor had a lounge and rooms for overnight guests. Outside, the building was surrounded by terraces where people could watch the airplanes. The Club House opened in June 1929. But the Great Depression brought an end to Sky Harbor just six months later. The building was later destroyed by fire.

== Stronghold Castle ==
Walter Strong at Stronghold. Courtesy Strong Family Collection.

At about the same time that Sky Harbor was on the drawing boards, Webster was hired to design a home for Walter A. Strong, the publisher of the Chicago Daily News. Architecturally, this project was worlds apart from Sky Harbor. And it still stands. Strong wanted to build a summer home for his wife and five young children. He had purchased 360 acres of wooded property north of Oregon, Illinois that included a limestone bluff overlooking the Rock River. His wife, Josephine, was Maurice Webster's older sister, so Strong had been a frequent guest at Bee Tree Farm. He wanted Webster to design a house that would sit atop the bluff. The original concept was to build a simple barn and silo structure, but it quickly grew into something resembling a castle, with 16 bedrooms, 9 baths, and 8 fireplaces. It took two years to complete and cost $85,000.

The castle was done in a Tudor Revival architectural style that was influenced by Strong's travels to Europe and his English ancestry. It came to be known as the Stronghold Castle. It had a Great Hall reminiscent of a medieval banqueting room, a circular library with a movable bookcase that revealed a secret passage, and a five-story circular tower with a staircase that seemed to float as it spiraled upwards. Webster accomplished that effect by using unseen steel rods to cantilever each tread out from the wall. At the top was an observation deck with commanding views of the surrounding countryside.

The Strong family spent their first summer in residence in 1930. In 1962, the family sold Stronghold to the Presbyterian Church. It now serves as a four-season retreat, conference center and camp. The U.S. Army Corps of Engineers would go there for team building exercises and marvel at how the staircase was built.

== Beloit College stadium and field house ==
Walter Strong was a graduate and trustee of Beloit College. After his untimely death, in 1931, Josephine donated the funds to build a stadium in his honor. Maurice Webster was commissioned to design Strong Stadium. It was a contemporary poured concrete structure with a series of ramps and passageways. It seated 1,600 and was dedicated October 13, 1934. Its seating capacity was later increased. It is still in use today.

After World War II, the G.I. Bill increased the size of the student body at the college. The 1904 gymnasium was no longer adequate. In 1946, Beloit College began planning a field house that could serve as a gymnasium and provide space for large events, such as concerts and commencement ceremonies. The college bought an unused Army aircraft hangar, that was boxed but had never been shipped overseas. This provided the basic structure for the field house, but it needed an architect to bring the plan to fruition. They turned once again to Maurice Webster to design the field house. The project was deceptively complex. It was to include balconies, a running track, locker rooms, exercise rooms and showers. The college paid $11,000 for the surplus hangar, but the ultimate construction cost was $300,000. Dedicated on December 6, 1947, it was described as "strikingly modern, through the base of a pylon of concrete and glass."

== Chess Pavilion ==
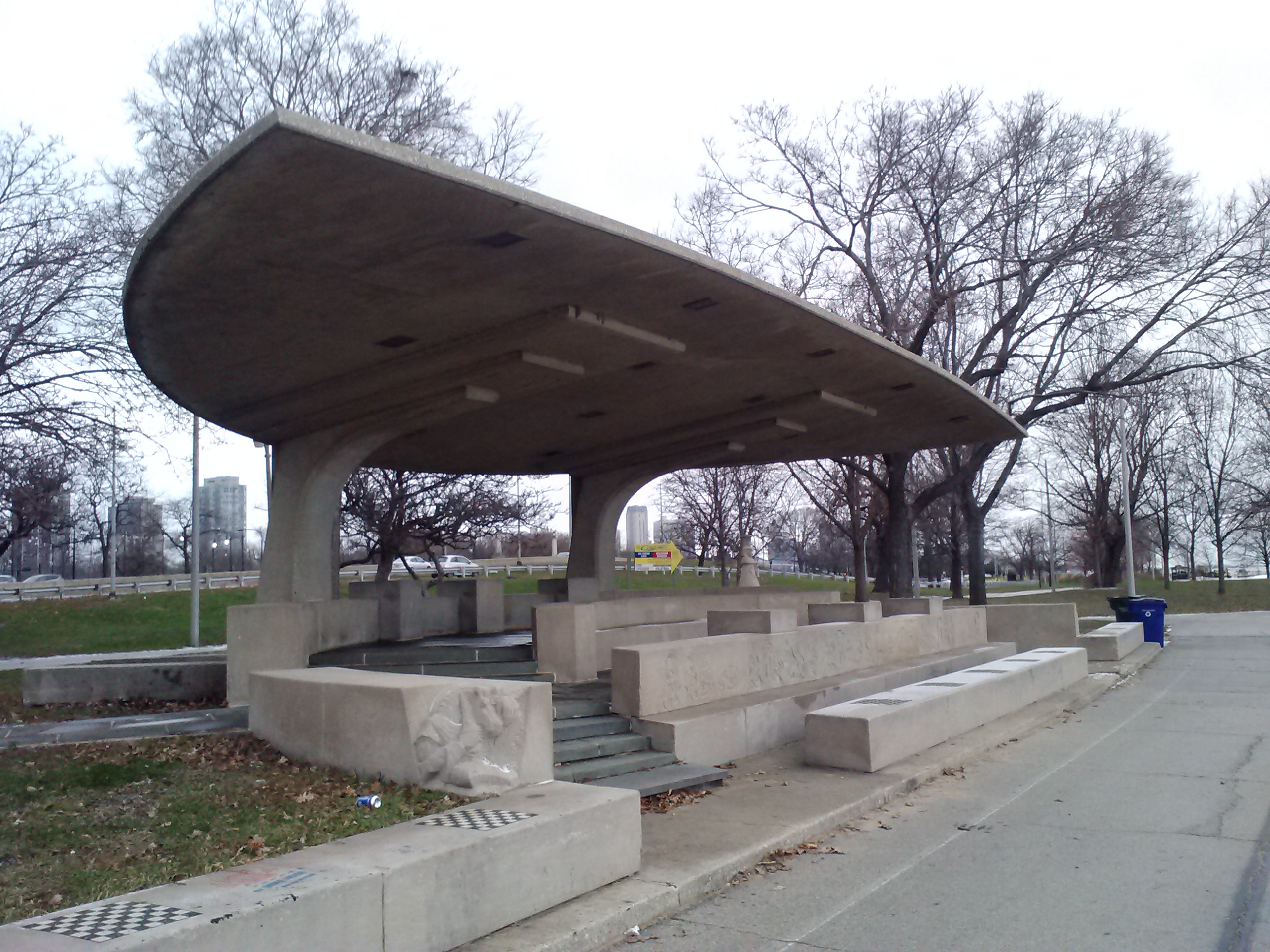
The Chess Pavilion in Lincoln Park, Chicago

Ever since the 1930s, North Avenue Beach had been a popular summer spot for Chicagoans to gather and play chess. In the 1950s, Laurens Hammond, chairman of the board of the Hammond Organ Company and a chess lover himself, donated $90,000 for the construction of a new Chess Pavilion at North Beach. Maurice Webster, Hammond's friend, was commissioned to design the Pavilion.

The Pavilion, a modern open-air structure made of Indiana limestone and sweeping concrete forms, is both "architectural and a sculptural work of art". A seating area covered by a thin, wing-like roof overlooks Lake Michigan. Five-foot tall sculptures of king and queen chess pieces flank the area, while other pieces are incised in limestone. These were created by artist Boris Gilbertson.

The Chess Pavilion was opened in 1957. That year, it received a citation of merit from the Chicago Chapter of the American Institute of Architects. It has been delighting people ever since. Blair Kamin, architecture critic for the Chicago Tribune, wrote the Pavilion is "at once a sculptural object, an orienting device and a lively people place". In 2016, it earned an honorable mention for the Leicester B. Holland prize.
