= Towner K. Webster =

Towner Keeney Webster
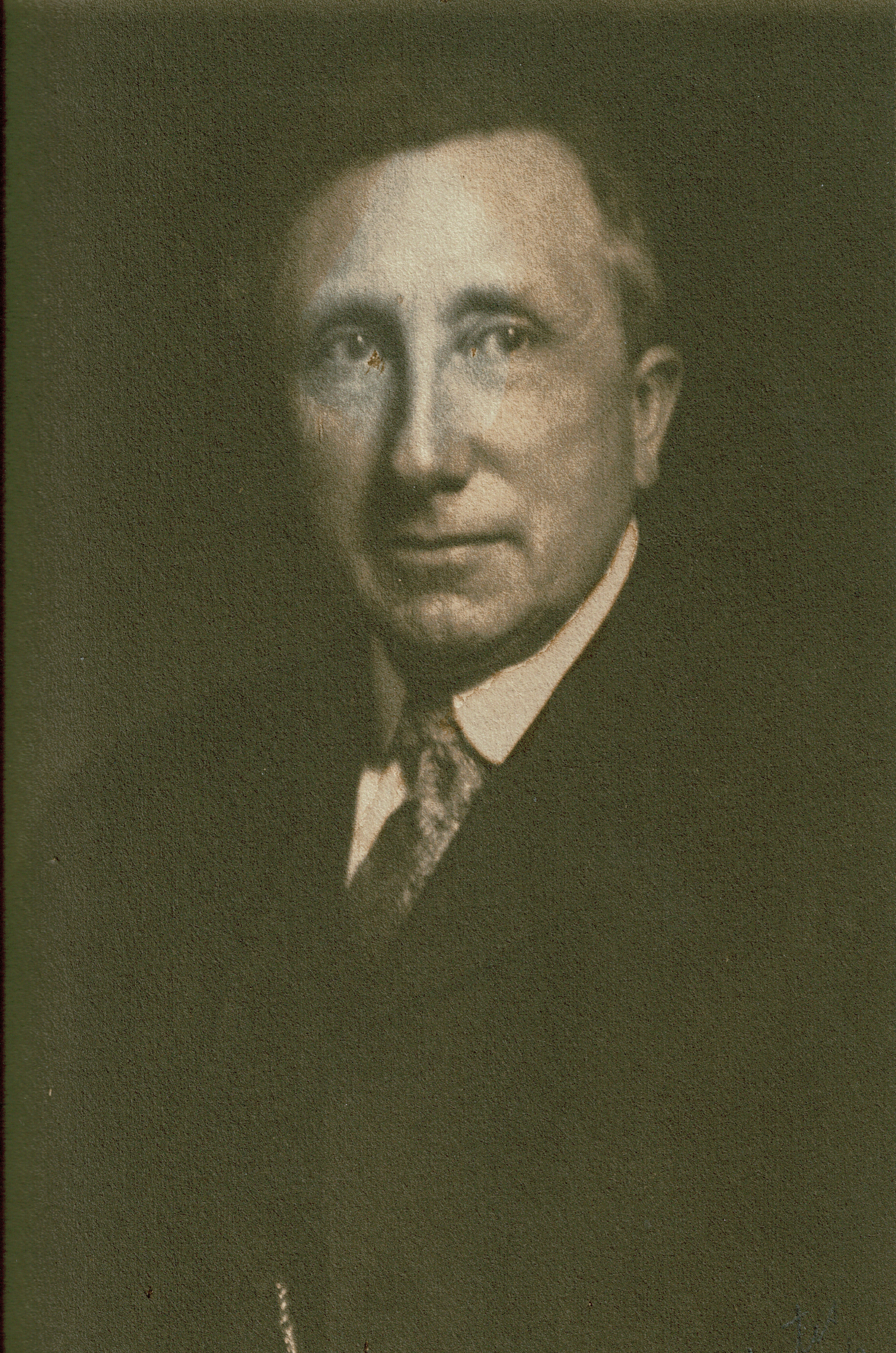
- Towner Keeney Webster in 1906. Courtesy of the Webster Family
- Born: July 15, 1849; Ithaca, New York
- Died: October 11, 1922 (aged 73); Evanston, Illinois
- Occupation: Industrialist
- Spouse: Emma Josephine Kitchell Webster (1850-1937)

Towner Keeney Webster (1849–1922) was an American industrialist and business leader who started several businesses, including Webster Manufacturing and Webster Electric.

== Early years ==
Webster was born in Ithaca, New York. His father, Dr. Henry Keeney Webster (1800–1857), died when he was eight years old. His mother, Sarah Haviland (1811–1885), was left with little money and three children to raise. By age 12, Webster had a full-time job and never achieved more than a grade school education. When he turned 18, he traveled alone to Chicago and began work at a dry goods store. Within a year or two, his mother and two older sisters followed. All settled in Evanston, Illinois. Webster's first business, a drug and grocery store on Davis Street in Evanston, was a success. He sold his interest in the grocery to his partner, so he could start a clothing store. The clothing store failed. Shortly thereafter, in 1874, he married Emma Josephine Kitchell (1850–1937). Webster needed to find a new way to make a living.

== Webster Manufacturing ==
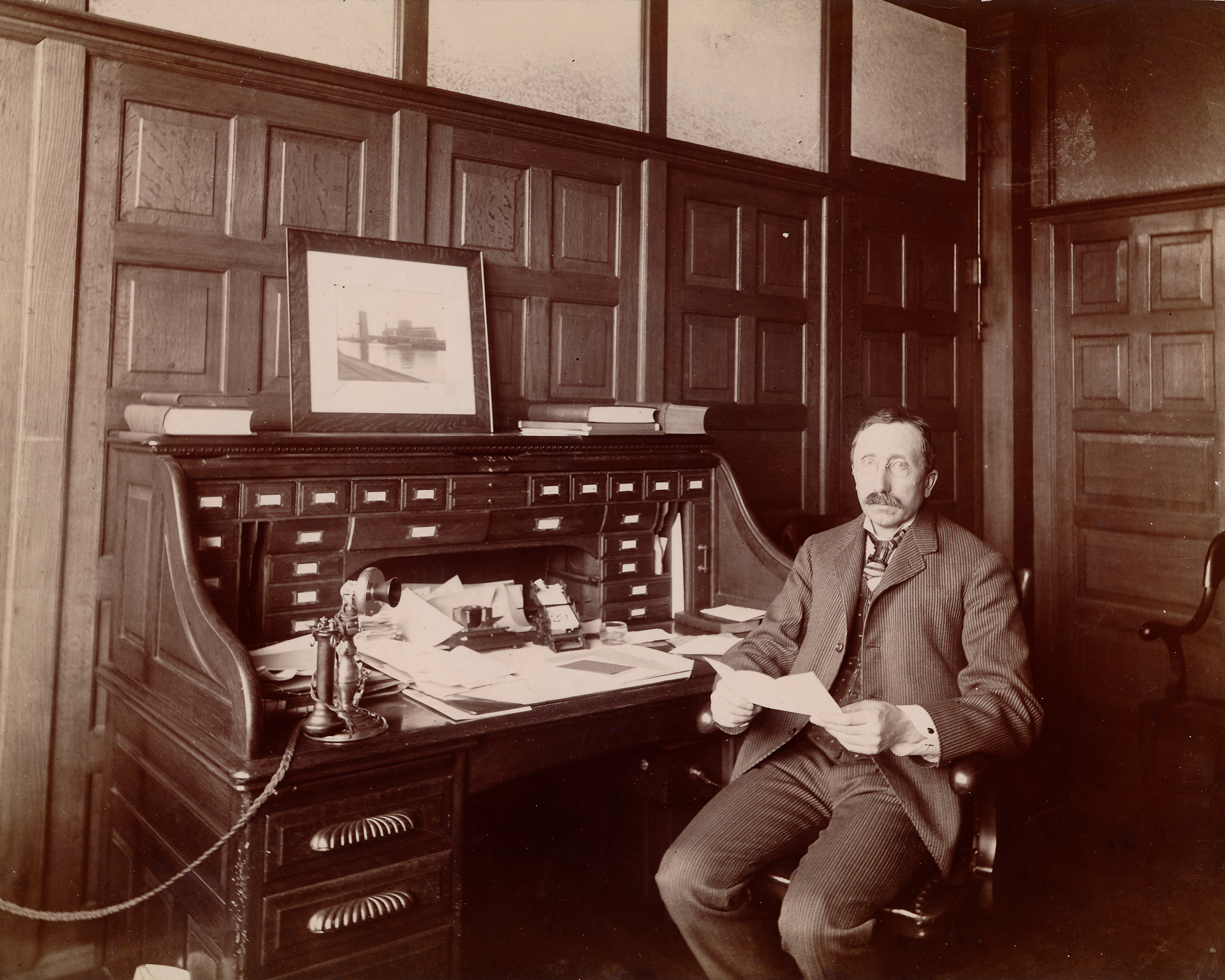
Towner K. Webster at Western Avenue. Courtesy of the Webster Family.

Webster became intrigued with an invention called the "'Common-sense' elevator bucket." These buckets were easily manufactured, and when attached to a continuous belt could carry large amounts of grain to the tops of grain elevators. Because of developments like Cyrus McCormick's reaper, elevators were springing up all over the Midwest. In 1876, he began making common-sense buckets in a small shop on Kinzie Street in Chicago. His company grew quickly as he developed machinery for handling grain. He acquired partners and built his first factory in 1882. It doubled and then redoubled in size, and in 1889 Webster moved to a new plant on Western Avenue and Fifteenth Street. His partners dropped out, the firm became the Webster Manufacturing Company.

In the early 1890s a group of investors, one of whom was Mark Twain, gave Webster Manufacturing the contract to make the Paige Compositor. The device, which set type, was a complicated mechanical marvel with 18,000 parts. Webster built a new five-story building at the Western Avenue plant to deliver 3000 compositors under the contract. Unfortunately, the compositor was expensive to manufacture and when it broke down only the inventor's chief engineer, Charles Davis, could fix it. The rival linotype machine soon came to dominate the typesetting market. What had seemed like a profitable business venture, cost Mark Twain a fortune and almost bankrupt Webster Manufacturing. Fewer than half-a-dozen machines were actually built. The sole remaining Paige compositor is housed at the Mark Twain House and Museum in Hartford, Connecticut.

In 1897, having returned to his core business, Webster built a two-million-bushel grain elevator on the newly opened Manchester Ship Canal in England. That project provided the inspiration for one of Henry Kitchell Webster's early novels. In 1907, Webster moved its headquarters to Tiffin, Ohio where it exists today as Webster Industries. The Nordholt family owned and operated the company until 1986.

== Webster Electric ==
During his tenure in Tiffin, Webster became interested in a new invention, the Milton magneto. The magneto could start gasoline engines without cranking. After refining the device into what he thought to be a workable ignition system, Webster signed a contract with the Cadillac Automobile company which intended to make it standard on their cars. But the magneto proved to be unreliable and the contract was canceled. Webster's son, Towner K. Webster Jr., was an engineer who eventually perfected the magneto as an ignition system for farm engines. In 1913, Webster Sr. opened a new company in Racine, Wisconsin named Webster Electric.

The magneto was a profitable product, but it was gradually supplanted by other ignition systems. After Webster's death, the company struggled until the 1930s, when it introduced a popular intercom called the Teletalk. Then, in 1946, Webster Electric debuted the Ekotape recorder, and was for a time a pioneer in magnetic recording. The company was eventually sold to Sta-Rite Industries.

== Business and civic leadership ==
In 1903, Webster helped found the City Club of Chicago, a social club whose object was “the investigation and improvement of the city of Chicago.” Webster served as the club's second president and was an occasional speaker. The City Club is today the longest-running civic forum in Chicago.

As Webster Manufacturing grew, he became increasingly involved with labor unions. Unlike many manufacturers, however, Webster believed workers had a right to a decent living wage. While he opposed union attempts to limit output, he defended their right to organize. In a speech on open versus closed shops, he argued “I think the union stands as a great middle wall between the small manufacturer and the great overwhelming power of organized capital.” His straightforward solution to labor unions was to “grant a fair day’s work for a fair day’s pay.” As a result of his position, Webster enjoyed a level of trust with both management and labor.

He served on numerous arbitration boards. In 1907, when the contract between the Chicago newspaper publishers and the Typographical Union expired, they were unable to come to terms. Webster was selected as the sole arbitrator and found a solution acceptable to both parties. As Walter A. Strong noted, "His decision at so critical a stage in the development of relations between capital and labor and in union practice attracted the attention of many industries in addition to newspapers."

== Personal life ==
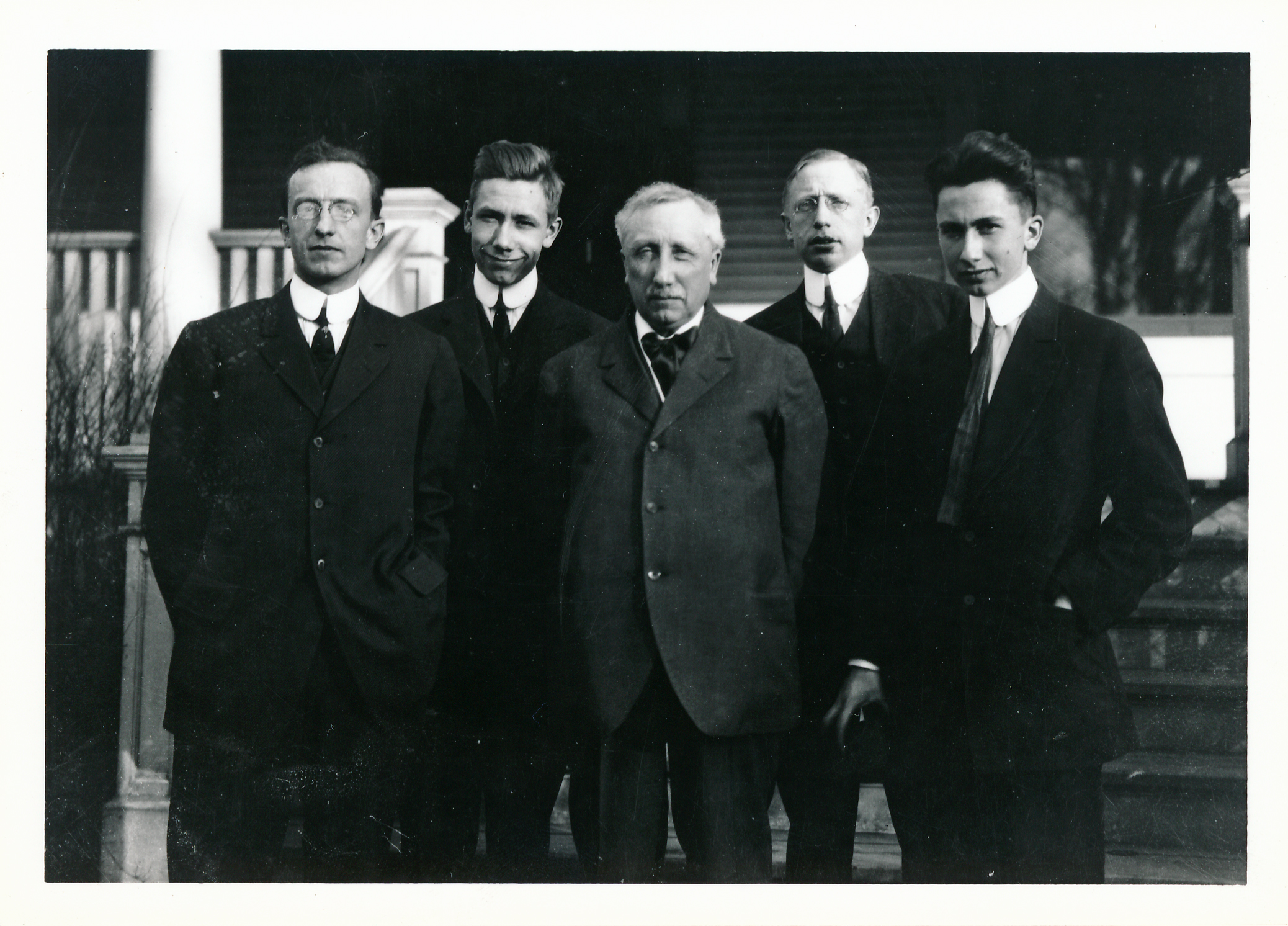
Webster & Sons. L to R: Towner Jr., Ronald, Towner Sr., Henry Kitchell, Maurice. Courtesy of the Webster Family.

Webster and Emma Kitchell had six children who survived to adulthood: Henry Kitchell (1875), Henrietta Seymour (1877), Towner Keeney Jr. (1881), Josephine Haviland (1883), Ronald (1890), and Maurice (1892). All were raised in Evanston, Illinois. Henry became a well-known early twentieth century novelist. Maurice became a notable Chicago architect. In 1913, Josephine married Walter Strong, who would later become publisher of the Chicago Daily News.

It was not uncommon for well-to-do Chicagoans to have summer homes. After starting Webster Electric, he bought farmland north of Oregon, Illinois. His declared intention was to create a place “to alienate the affections of his grandchildren from their parents.” In 1917, he commissioned Maurice, who had just been licensed to practice architecture in Illinois, to build a large wood frame summer house. A year later, he had Towner Jr. oversee construction of a swimming pool. The family named it Bee Tree Farm. His grandchild, Stokely Webster, would later describe it as a "magical place" that would shape his approach to art.

In 1922, Webster was admitted to Evanston Hospital with acute appendicitis. He died there on October 11. Emma and the family continued to use Bee Tree Farm. In 1928, Walter Strong bought 360 acres of woodlands just south of the farm. There, he and Josephine built their own summer home, which came to be known as Stronghold Castle.

== Notable descendants ==
- Henry Kitchell Webster (1875–1932) - Novelist
- Josephine Webster Strong (1883–1961)
- Maurice Webster (1892–1982) - Architect
- Stokely Webster (1912–2001) - Artist
- Jonathan Strong (1944–present) - Novelist
- James G. Webster (1951–present) - Professor
