= Stronghold Center =

Stronghold Castle
- Stronghold Castle, as seen from the south-east
- Interactive map of the Stronghold Castle area

General information
- Architectural style: Tudor
- Location: Oregon, Illinois, USA, 1922 Illinois Route 2 North
- Coordinates: 42.045479°N 89.343276°W
- Construction started: 1928
- Completed: 1930
- Client: Walter Strong
- Owner: Blackhawk Presbytery

Design and construction
- Architect: Maurice Webster

Stronghold Castle or Stronghold Center is located near Oregon, Illinois, atop the limestone bluffs along the Rock River. Designed by Maurice Webster, it was built between 1928 and 1930 by Walter A. Strong, then owner and publisher of the Chicago Daily News. In 1962, the castle and surrounding area were purchased by Presbyterian Church. Today, it serves as a year-round camping and retreat center, hosting summer camps and an Olde English Faire.

== The castle ==
Walter Strong at Stronghold. Courtesy Strong Family Collection.

The castle was built by Walter Strong as a summer home for his wife, Josephine, and their five children. In 1928, Strong bought 360 acres of wooded property north of Oregon, Illinois which included a limestone bluff overlooking the Rock River. He was familiar with the area because he and Josephine often stayed at nearby Bee Tree Farm, the summer home of his father-in-law, Towner K. Webster. Strong hired Josephine’s brother, architect Maurice Webster, to design a house on the bluff. The original concept was to build a simple barn and silo structure, but it quickly grew into something resembling a castle, with 16 bedrooms, 9 baths, 8 fireplaces, gargoyles and secret passageways. The original driveway was cut through the bluff which served as a stone quarry for the walls and fireplaces. The castle’s exterior took about nine months to build, the interior another year. In total, the project, which continued into the Great Depression, cost $85,000.

The final Tudor style architecture was influenced by Strong’s travels to Europe, his English ancestry, and the historical novels of Sir Walter Scott. Some think the castle was also a retort to fellow newspaper publisher and competitor, William Randolph Hearst. In 1919, after inheriting a fortune, Hearst began construction of the opulent Spanish Renaissance style Hearst Castle at San Simeon. The rustic Strong family retreat, which they called Stronghold, was in many ways the antithesis of San Simeon. Stronghold encouraged informal living and had many features intended to delight visitors, especially children.

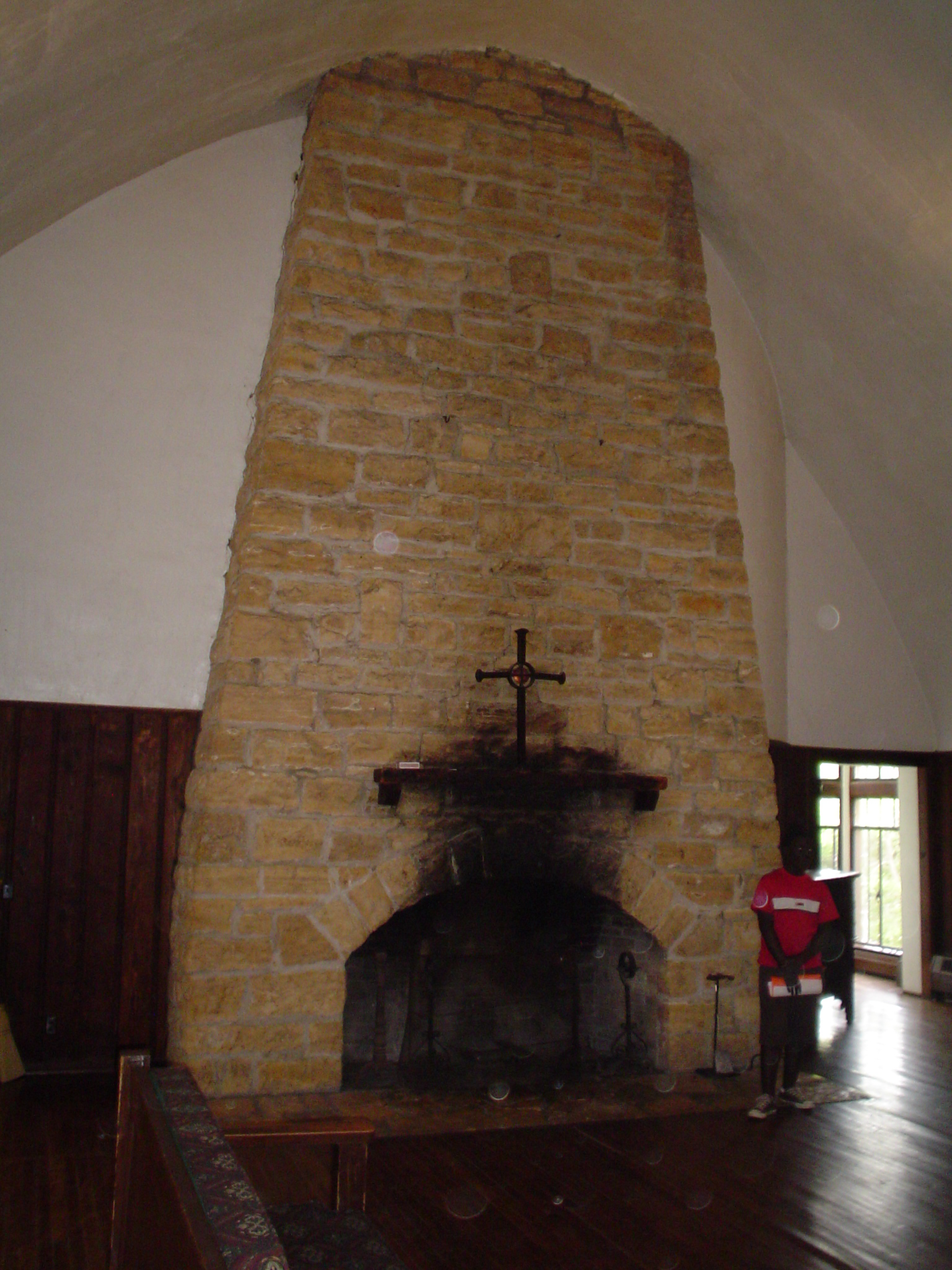
The Great Hall.

At the center of the house was the Great Hall, modeled after a medieval banqueting room. It was 55 feet long, 34 feet wide and had a vaulted ceiling 34 feet high at its peak. At one end was a massive stone fireplace.

Just off the Great Hall was a circular library lined with bookcases. Its paneling was stained with coffee grounds to simulate age. One bookcase was designed to swing backwards revealing a secret passageway. It led to a chapel which was finished many years after the original construction.

The Strongs wanted their family and guests to dine together, so Josephine had a 20-foot by 6-foot table built for the dining room. It was made from a massive oak tree and weighed a half a ton. It was so large, it had to be placed in the room before the exterior wall could be completed. It was so heavy that the floor sagged and had to be jacked up from the basement.

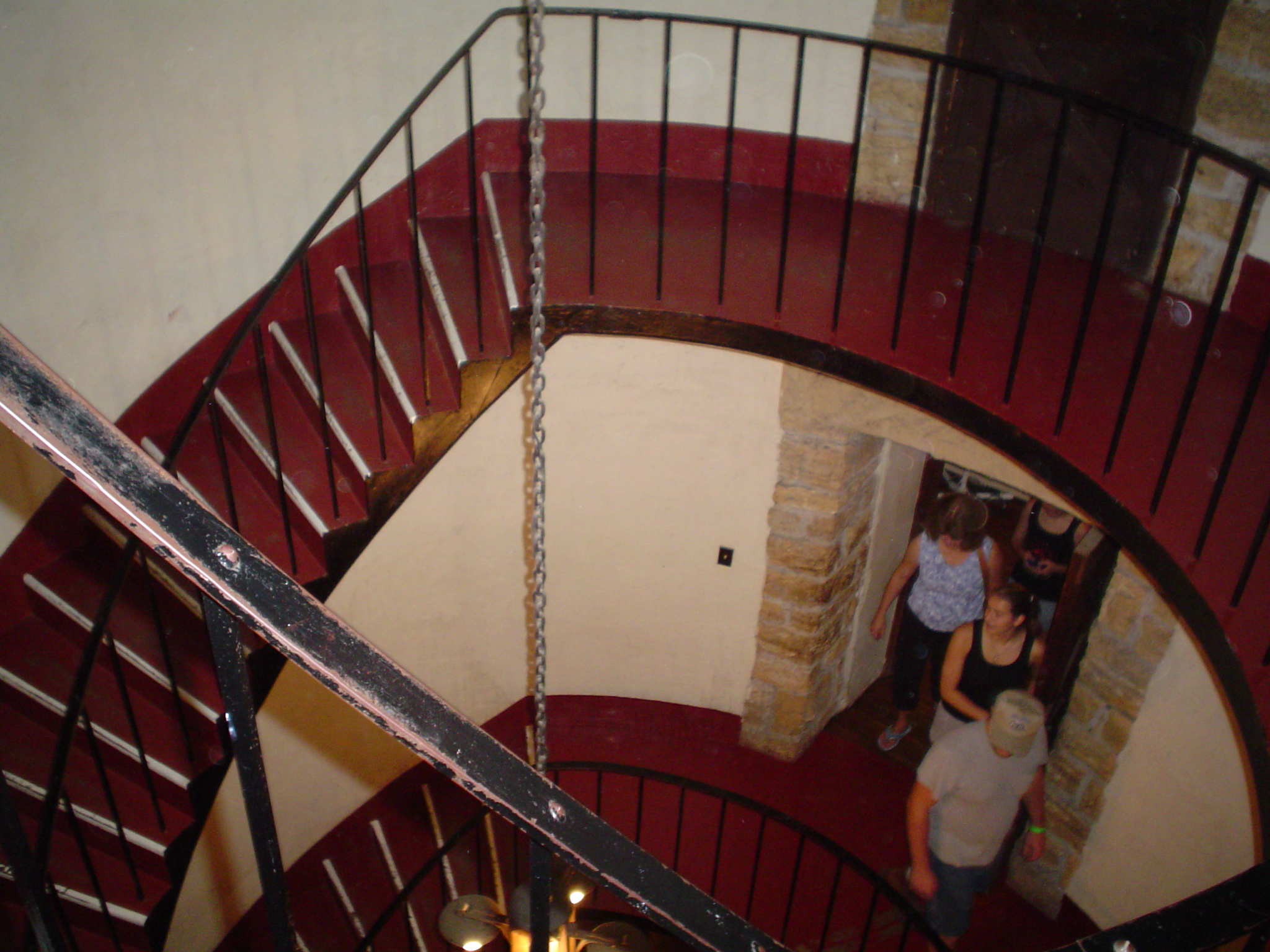
The staircase up the tower.

Tying the levels of the castle together was a five-story circular tower. The staircase, which used unseen steel rods to cantilever each tread out from the wall, seemed to float as it spiraled up the height of the tower. At the top was an observation deck with commanding views of the surrounding countryside. At the time of its construction, Lorado Taft’s Black Hawk Statue was visible around a bend down river.

In 1932, Josephine hired an unemployed Russian artist, Nicholas Kaisaroff, to decorate parts of the castle. He painted the ceiling of the library in a faux-medieval style. He also painted a fresco on the upper walls of the tower. These were based on characters in Grimms’ Fairy Tales, like Rumpelstiltskin. Kaisaroff is said to have included the faces of the family and their pets in some of his paintings.

The family spent their first summer there in 1930. Walter Strong scarcely had time to enjoy Stronghold. On May 10, 1931, he died of a heart attack at his home in Winnetka, Illinois. He was 47 years old. Josephine continued to divide her time between her Winnetka home and Stronghold until her death in 1961. In 1962, Stronghold was sold to the Presbyterian Church.

== The center ==
The current owner, the Presbytery of Blackhawk, is an association of 75 Presbyterian congregations in Illinois. Originally, Stronghold operated as a summer camp and was housed almost entirely within the castle. But in the intervening years, the center’s mission has grown. It now functions as a four-season conference, retreat and camping center. In a typical year, it hosts over 12,000 visitors of many faiths.[l] One of its most popular events is the Olde English Faire. Every October, performers and people dressed in period costumes wander about the castle grounds and sell their wares.

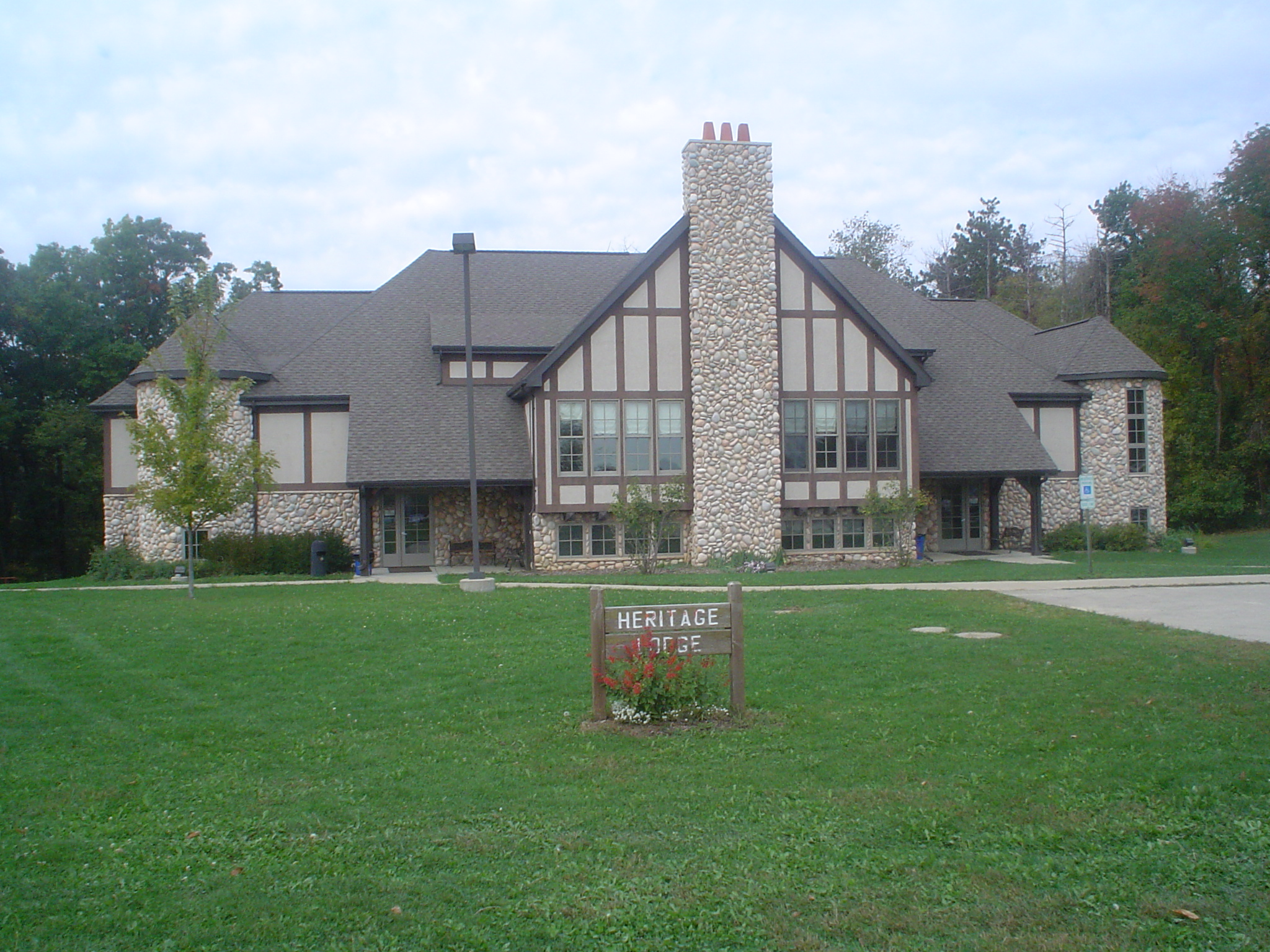
Heritage Lodge.

To accommodate its expanded range of activities, the center has built five modern buildings and a number of rustic cabins and structures. The newest of these is Heritage Lodge, which mimics the Tudor style of the castle and can accommodate 32 people.
