= Samuel Merwin =

Samuel Merwin may refer to:

- Samuel E. Merwin (1831–1907), Lieutenant Governor of Connecticut
- Samuel Kimball Merwin, Jr. (1910–1996), science fiction writer
- Samuel Merwin (writer) (1874–1936), playwright and author
