= K. S. Brooks =

American novelist

- Born: Kathryn Salina Brooks; October 16, 1963 (age 62)
- Occupations: Writer; photographer
- Relatives: Stokely Webster (grandfather)
- Website: www.ksbrooks.com

K. S. Brooks (born Kathryn Salina Brooks; October 16, 1963 in New York, New York) is an American writer and photographer.

According to the Maryland Writers' Association, Brooks has written for over twenty years. Her writing and photography have been published in the U.S. and abroad. Brooks's novel, Lust for Danger, was awarded Honorable Mention in the 2005 Jada Press Book of the Year Awards. In addition to novels, Brooks has published numerous poems, letters and news articles.

Brooks is executive director of Indies Unlimited, a multi-author website dedicated to the independent publishing community.

Referred to by some as "The Stevens County News Agency," Brooks currently works in multiple roles (editor, reporter, and photographer) for multiple small papers in various towns in Stevens County, Washington.

== Photography ==
Brooks' photographic works have received receiving multiple awards from Kodak, and have been featured in one-man art shows at galleries in the Boston area. She photographs many different subjects, per the Boston Globe: "...birds and wildlife, combined with avant garde glamor shots, landscapes and corporate assignments have rounded out a varied artistic and commercial portfolio."

Brooks is the granddaughter of artist Stokely Webster.
