= Clement Quirk Lane =

American newspaper editor

Clement Quirke Lane was the city editor for the Chicago Daily News from 1942 to 1958. Born in 1897, he joined the Chicago Daily News after high school, where during Prohibition he worked the crime beat. As described in Capone: The Life and World of Al Capone, legend has it that many of the often-comical nicknames for Chicago's underworld figures, including "Greasy Thumb" Gusik, "Loudmouth" Levine, and "Violet" Fusco, can be credited “to James Doherty, a Chicago Tribune crime reporter, and Clem Lane, a Chicago Daily News rewrite man, who supposedly amused themselves on slow nights by coining them."

Later he became a columnist, where in 1938 he invented the characters "Oxie O'Rourke" and "Torchnose McGonigle." These were figures in the vein of predecessor Chicago newspaperman Finley Peter Dunne's "Mr. Dooley" and "Mr. Henessey," stand-ins for the "voice of the people." Chicago Daily News columnist Mike Royko would take up that tradition afterwards with his character "Slats Grobnik." According to a Time magazine article about his work in January 1944, Lane said, in reference to his creation, Oxie was "the perfect answer for a newspaperman; he can't be scooped because he knows everything. He is the voice of the people west of the tracks."

Lane was known for his temper; according to his obituary he "ruled the city staff ... in fiery justice." A reporter who began his career under Lane, James McCartney, described him later as "the archetype of the old-fashioned city editor, an Irish Catholic, reformed alcoholic with a high school education, a great mane of white hair ... irascible, immensely honest, tremendously talented, the personification of the newspaper ... and very, very difficult to work for."

According to Peter Smith’s memoir, A Cavalcade of Lesser Horrors—in part about Smith’s relationship to his father, John Justin Smith, one of Lane’s reporters—Lane produced a memo to guide the writing on his paper sometime in the 1950s. Smith has reproduced that document:

To the staff:

By and large your writing is clean and sharp. But not always. And there are still laggards among you.

So— Short words. Anglo-Saxon words. The King James version has some fine ones. So does A. Lincoln. Let’s make it little Latin and less Greek.

Short sentences. Old J.P. Harding, the restaurant man, told his meat cutters: “Slice it thin and it’ll never be tough.” Keep sentences short and you won’t puzzle the customers. Nor the city desk.

Short leads. What’s the copywriter going to say in the headline? Your lead should be the same thought with a bit of flesh over the skeleton. Ease the customer into the story.

Short paragraphs. Easy on the eye. Short story. Easy on the markup man AND the customer. Anybody can get all the facts in, given space enough. But it takes the skilled craftsman, the artist, to tell the same story, short and smart.

Before you start writing your story, get the desk word as to length. Tell it in the length decided on. Tell it in broad strokes. Forget everything that isn’t vital. By writing it short you can write it whole. And it will do away with city desk surgery that may cut off your favorite paragraph or sentence.

Lane

Note: after you have mastered these rules, you’ll know enough to know when you can break them.

— Clem Lane, "The Gospel According to Clem", A Cavalcade of Lesser Horrors (2011)

The memo is a notable model of mid-century American newspaper style, whose roots may perhaps go back, through Ernest Hemingway and Mark Twain, to Abraham Lincoln’s Gettysburg Address.

Later in life Lane became involved in Alcoholics Anonymous, helping to establish it in Chicago after that group's founding in Akron, Ohio, in 1935.
