= Riverside Plaza (Chicago) =

Building in Chicago, Illinois

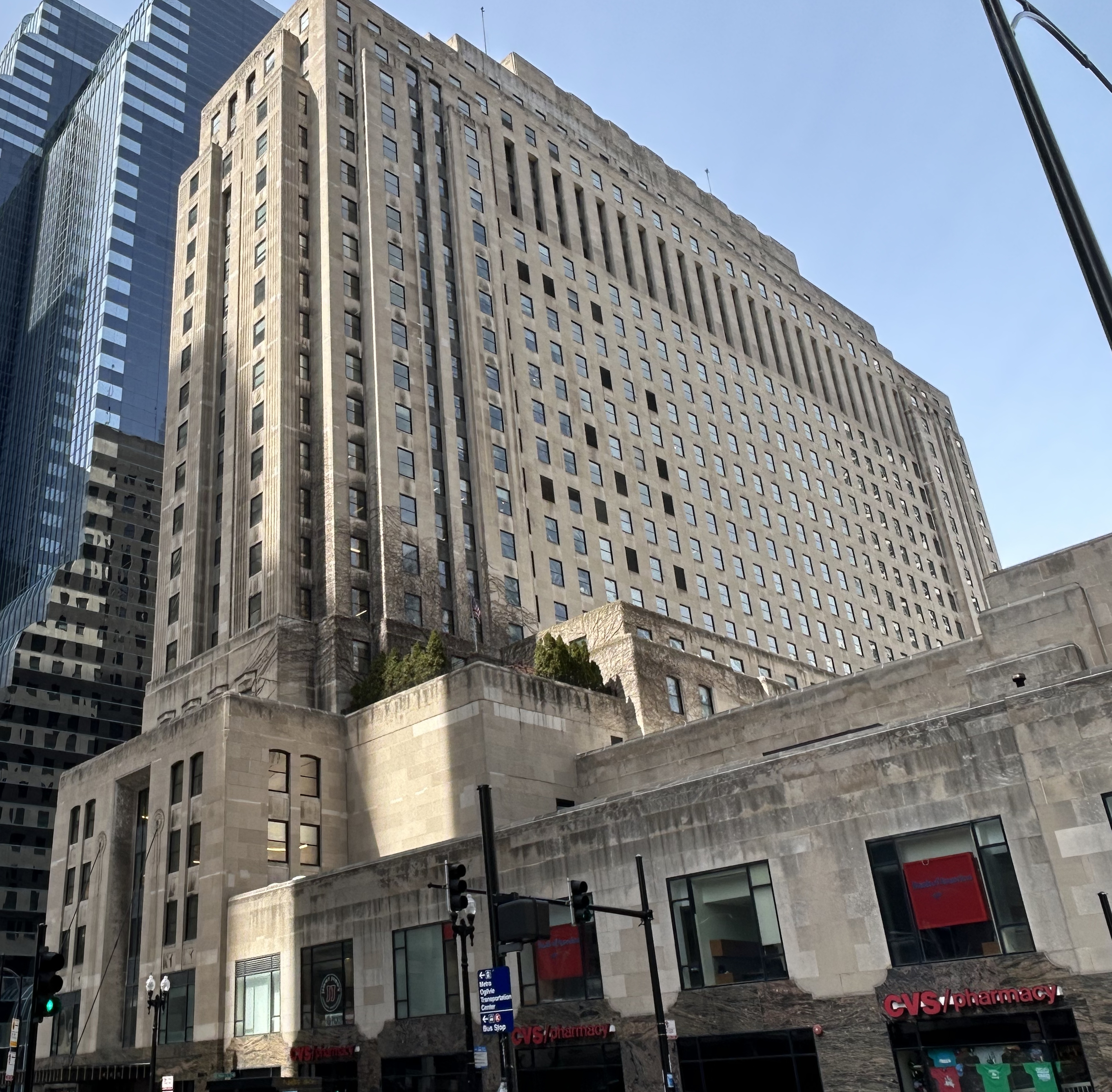
- 2023 photograph

- Location within Chicago metropolitan area

General information
- Location: 2 North Riverside Plaza, Chicago, Illinois, United States
- Coordinates: 41.882548°N 87.639220°W
- Completed: 1929

Height
- Roof: 302 feet (92 m)

Technical details
- Floor count: 26

Design and construction
- Architect: Holabird & Roche/Holabird & Root
- Developer: Chicago Daily News

The Riverside Plaza is an Art Deco style building at 2 North Riverside Plaza in Chicago, Illinois, United States. It was originally known as the Chicago Daily News Building. At the time of its completion in 1929, the Daily News was one of the dominant newspapers in Chicago. The first building in the United States to develop the "air-rights" over railroad tracks, the 26-story building helped revitalize the south central Chicago River from industrial transport to urban office corridor and made innovations in engineering and urban design.

== History ==
In the 1920s, the buildings along the river were industrial in nature and butted up against a waterway that was polluted and considered undesirable. This building was the first to develop the Chicago riverfront aesthetically as well as commercially. It was the first American skyscraper with an open-air plaza as part of its design.

In 1925, Walter A. Strong acquired the Chicago Daily News from the estate of Victor F. Lawson. Once he became publisher, Strong took immediate steps to build a modern newspaper facility. Lawson had owned a parcel along the river, which is now the site of the Chicago Opera House. Strong thought it too small and instead acquired the air rights over railroad tracks that ran along west side of the river opposite the original site. A year and one-half of meetings were required to reach an agreement between all parties. Once that was settled, Strong sold Lawson’s parcel to the utility magnate Samuel Insull, with the understanding that he construct a building that would include a new home for the Opera.

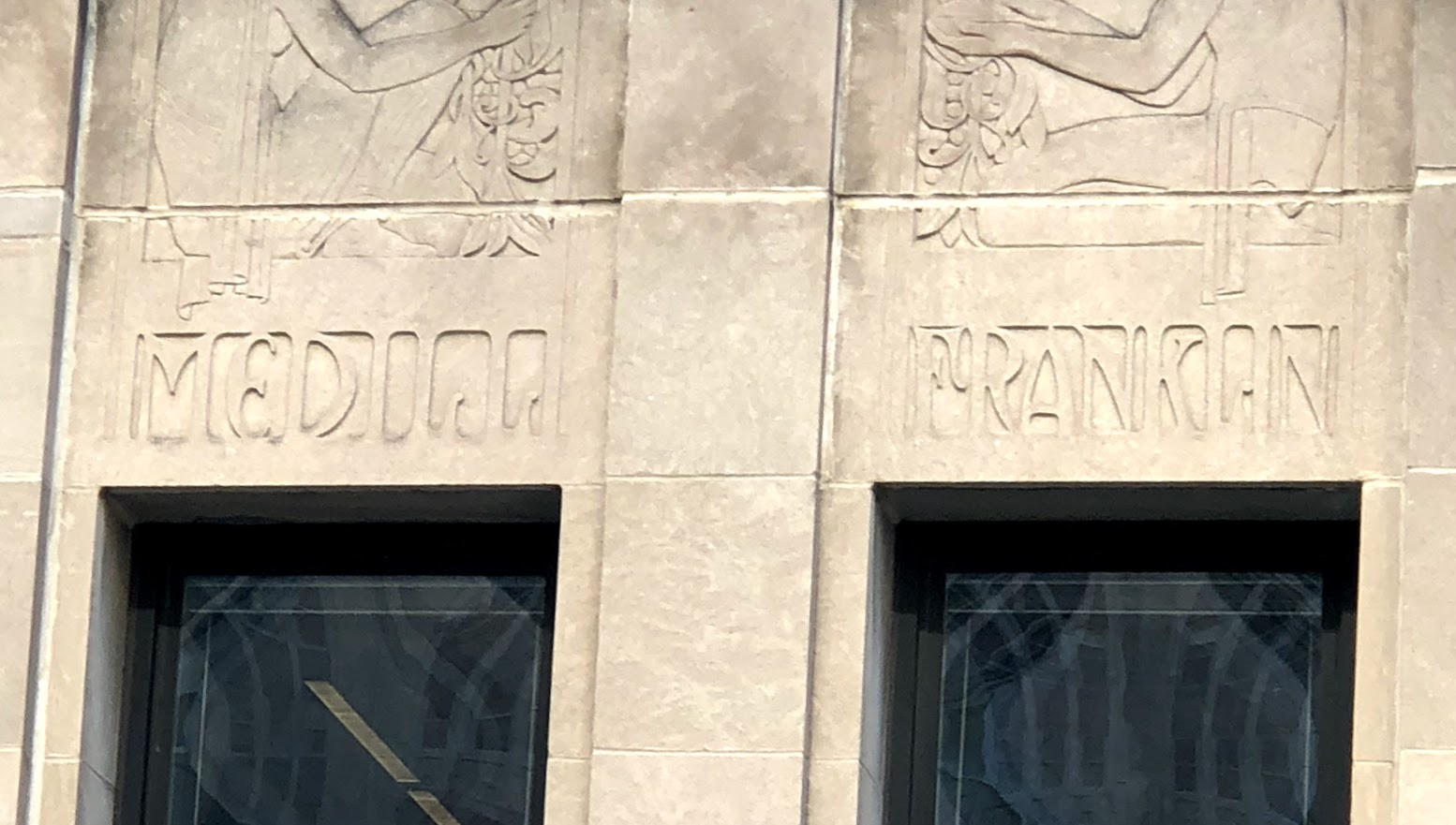
The names of Joseph Medill and Benjamin Franklin on the side of Riverside Plaza

Strong commissioned Holabird & Root to design a modern structure that would house 2,000 Daily News employees and provide studio space for his radio station, WMAQ. The building’s bold design and Art Deco façade were widely regarded as shot fired at the Chicago Tribune, which operated out of the Tribune Tower, a large Neo Gothic building on North Michigan Avenue completed in 1925. Inside, the building featured a much-admired mural by John W. Norton. It was dominated by diagonal lines, and divided into three sections: Gathering the News, Printing the News, & Transporting the News. In the fall of 1993, it was removed and put into storage, where it has remained. Outside, it had bas-reliefs depicting Benjamin Franklin, Charles Anderson Dana, Horace Greeley, Joseph Pulitzer, Samuel Bowles III, James Gordon Bennett and Joseph Medill and a fountain honoring Victor Lawson. The Chicago Daily News Building was completed in June 1929 at a cost of $8 million. During the dedication ceremony, President Herbert Hoover pressed a button that started the presses. The Daily News ceased publication in 1978. Although the building has since been renamed Riverside Plaza, according to the Tribune’s architecture critic, the Daily News Building remains, “one of Chicago's finest examples of Art Deco architecture and a path-breaking work of engineering and urban design.”

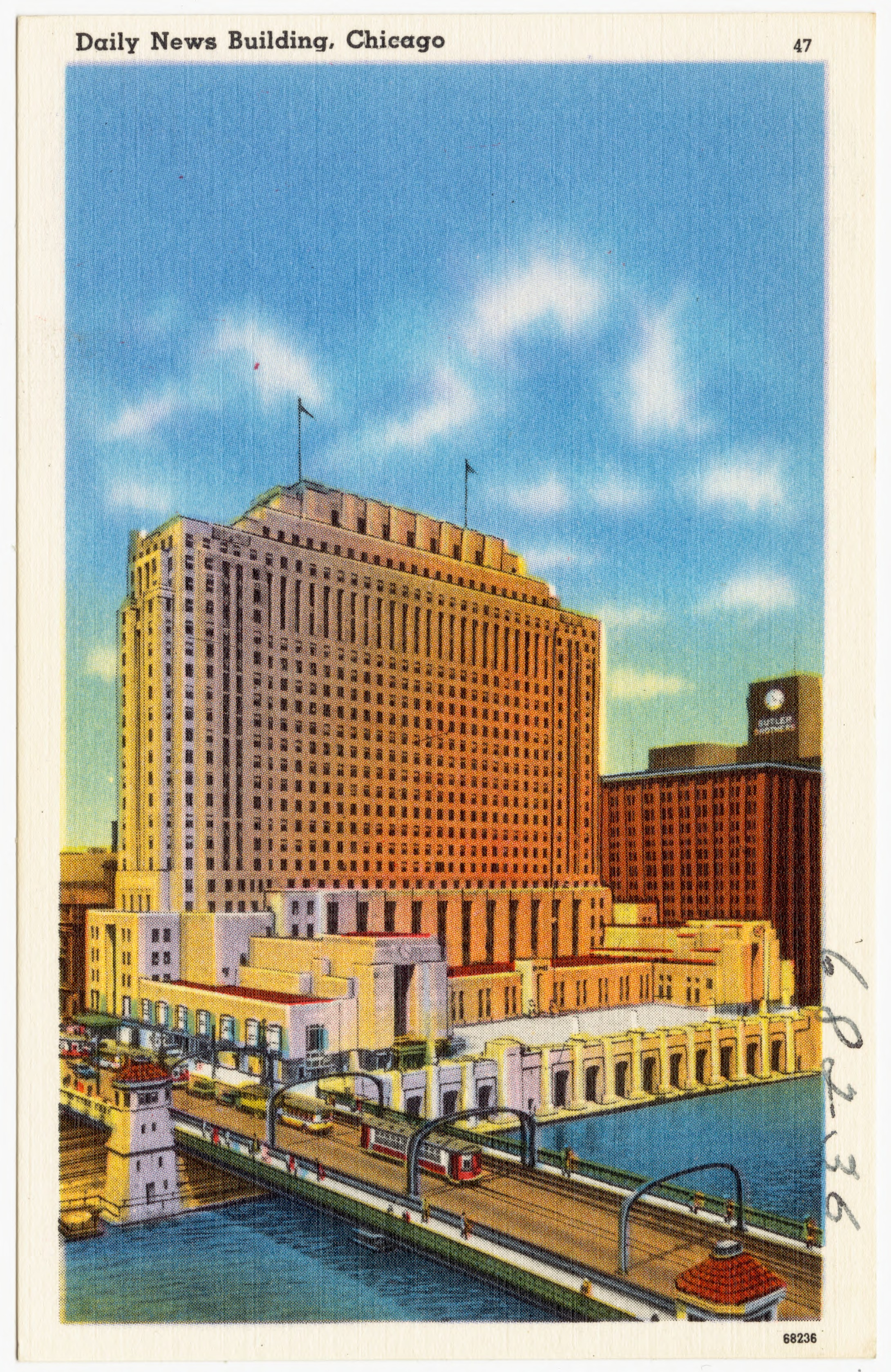
Postcard circa 1930–1945

A ramped concourse through the south side of this building now serves as the main entryway to the Ogilvie Transportation Center in Citigroup Center. This concourse was originally the main lobby, with an even floor in place of the ramp up to the bridge at Canal Street.
