= Henry Justin Smith =

Henry Justin Smith (June 19, 1875 – February 9, 1936) was managing editor of the Chicago Daily News.

Smith was born in Chicago, Illinois, the son of Justin A. and Mary L. Smith. In 1899, he married his cousin, Katherine Augusta Smith (1874–1940).

In 1934, he published a collection of three essays titled It's The Way It's Written. The addresses were suggested as supplementary reading for any course in journalism, or as an authentic picture of the newspaper world for readers in general. He also wrote the novel Poor Devil (1929).

Smith died in Evanston, Illinois, of pneumonia.
