= Paige Compositor =

Preliminary mechanical typesetter

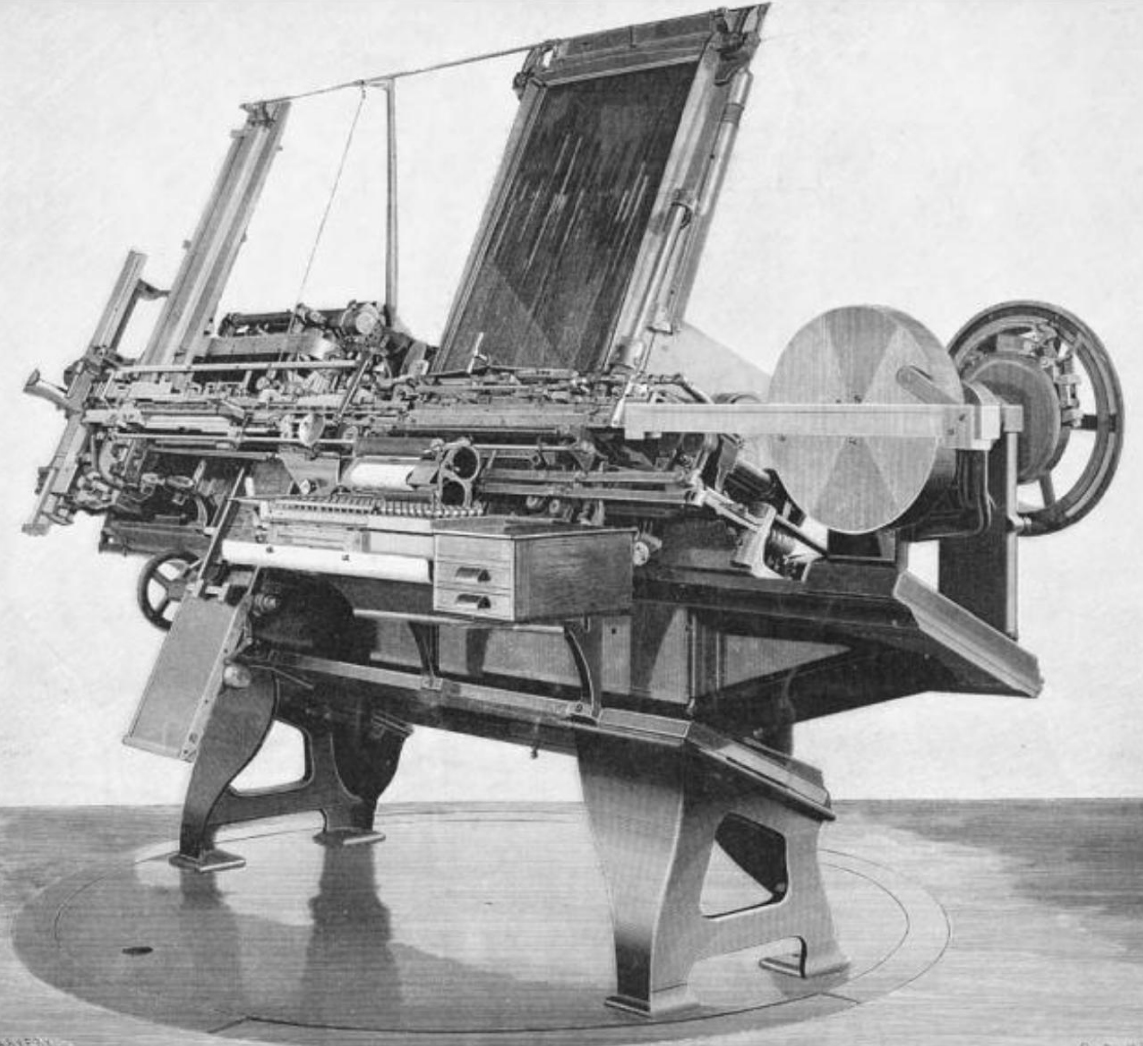
The Paige Compositor

The Paige Compositor was a machine invented by James W. Paige (1842–1917) between 1872 and 1888 to replace the human typesetter of a lead type-composed printing form with a mechanical arm. In the early 1890s, a group of inventors signed a contract with Towner K. Webster in Chicago to produce 3,000 compositors. However, the machine was not nearly as precise as it should have been and never turned a profit because of its complexity and continual need for adjustment based upon trial and error. As a result, it was the Linotype typesetting machine, which composed in a hot metal typesetting process, that became the new popular typesetting machine.

The author Mark Twain made a substantial investment into the failed endeavor: $300,000 (~$8,000,000 today). Twain, a former printer, invested not only the bulk of his book profits but also a large portion of the inheritance of Olivia Clemens, his wife. Many point to his over-investment in the Paige typesetting machine and other inventions as the cause of not only his family's financial decline but also the decline of his wit and humor.

Webster Manufacturing made fewer than six machines, which cost $15,000 apiece, over three times as much as the initial production estimates. One was donated by Cornell University for a scrap metal drive during World War II. The only surviving machine is displayed at the Mark Twain House in Hartford, Connecticut.
