= Walter A. Strong =

American publisher

Walter Ansel Strong
- Born: August 13, 1883; Chicago, Illinois
- Died: May 10, 1931 (aged 47); Winnetka, Illinois
- Occupations: Publisher, Chicago Daily News
- Spouse: Josephine Webster Strong

Walter Ansel Strong (1883–1931) was the publisher of the Chicago Daily News during Prohibition and the early days of the Great Depression. He was an innovator in business and a prominent civic leader.

== Early years ==
Walter Strong was born in Chicago on August 13, 1883, to Dr. Albert Bliss Strong and Ida Cook Strong. His father, a Union Army veteran, taught at Rush Medical College for many years, and later maintained a private medical practice. His mother was a conservatory-trained pianist and singer. She was the adopted daughter of Ansel B. and Helen Cook. Ansel was a stone masonry contractor who served on the Chicago City Council and in the Illinois State Legislature. In retirement, Cook built a large second home in Libertyville, Illinois, thirty miles north of Chicago.

Strong's early years were marked by tragedy. Three of his five siblings died of natural causes during childhood. His father had mental health issues, quite possibly bipolar disorder, and needed intermittent institutional care beginning when Walter was twelve years old. The stress of these events caused Strong's mother to leave Chicago in 1895 and move to Libertyville where she had a cottage adjacent to her father's property. A divorce decree, which her husband sought and which she did not oppose, was issued in 1896. In 1898, Strong's mother moved permanently to the Los Angeles, California area, with Strong's youngest brother in her custody.

With the break-up of the family and his father's illness, arrangements were made for Strong and his older brother, who were in their father's care, to reside in a group home operated by the West Side YMCA. Walter finished his final year of high school during his first year of residency there, graduating from the West Division Street School in 1899. During that time, family relatives supported the two young boys, particularly after their father's death following involuntary confinement in the State Hospital for the Insane in Kankakee (now Kankakee State Hospital) in March 1900.

One of their father's first cousins, Jessie Bradley, had married Victor Lawson, the publisher of the Chicago Daily News. She and her husband were among those who saw to it that Walter and his brother were afforded opportunities they otherwise might not have had. During their first year of residence at the West Side YMCA, Strong and his brother were newsboys for the Daily News, hawking papers after school on Madison Avenue streetcars for food money. Beginning the summer after high school, Walter was given a part-time job as a clerk at Lawson's morning newspaper, the Chicago Record. Walter held this job while he attended night classes at the Lewis Institute (now the Illinois Institute of Technology), which awarded him a degree in civil engineering in 1901.

In the fall of 1902, Strong entered Beloit College in Wisconsin as a sophomore. The Lawsons assisted his admission by guaranteeing his tuition. While attending Beloit, Strong supported himself with a variety of part-time jobs, including work at the Beloit Free Press. He also edited the student newspaper, and was art director for the Codex, the semi-annual yearbook. He was active in the Beta Theta Pi fraternity, where he formed lifelong friendships, and participated in a wide range of college sports and organizations. Strong accepted an offer from Mr. Lawson to join the staff at the Chicago Daily News shortly before he graduated.

== Chicago Daily News ==
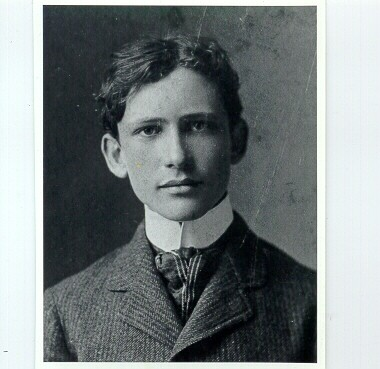
Walter Strong as a young clerk at the Chicago Daily News. Courtesy Walter Ansel Strong Papers, The Newberry Library, Chicago

Strong began his three-decade-long career at the Chicago Daily News as an audit clerk in August 1905. In 1908 he accompanied Victor Lawson to Europe as his secretary. Shortly thereafter, he became Lawson's office manager. In addition, Strong was given responsibility for overseeing the Chicago Daily News Fresh Air Fund Sanitarium, established by Jessie Lawson in 1887 for the benefit of poor urban children. Located on the lakefront at Fullerton Avenue, the sanitarium provided free transportation, health care, and meals daily except Sundays throughout the summer. Attendance averaged over 400 children daily, with “no one turned away for reason of class, color or condition.” Strong oversaw the construction of a new home for the sanitarium, a Prairie-style building designed by Dwight H. Perkins, which opened in 1920. When Strong became publisher in 1926, the building was winterized so it could operate year-round. The sanitarium was closed in 1937 and in 1952 it was converted into a theater now known as the Theater on the Lake.

In October 1909, Strong began attending evening classes at John Marshall Law School. He graduated in 1912 and was admitted to the bar. One of his law professors was Frank J. Loesch, with whom he would later collaborate on law enforcement and anti-corruption campaigns in Chicago. With the outbreak of WWI, when competition for newspaper readers became fierce, Lawson put Strong in charge of the circulation department of the paper. In recognition of his ability and dedication to the paper, Lawson made Strong business manager in 1921.

In the first several decades of Lawson's ownership, the Daily News had become one of the most widely read newspapers in the world, eclipsing its rival the Chicago Tribune. It had a reputation for fairness and honesty, and its international news coverage was second to none. However, after Lawson's wife died in 1913, his attention to the paper began to flag. The couple had no children and Lawson increasingly spent time away from Chicago at the estate and dairy farm his wife had developed and managed for them in Green Lake, Wisconsin. During the war years, Strong urged Lawson to invest in a modern plant so the Daily News could keep pace with its competitors. Initially, Lawson was interested enough to acquire an underused lot for that purpose, but he never followed through on the plan. The property, between Madison and Washington just east of the Chicago River, is where the Civic Opera House is today.

In addition to overseeing the business side of operations, in 1922 Strong was instrumental in creating the radio station WMAQ (AM). WMAQ was one of the first stations in Chicago, and among the first owned by a newspaper. Strong decided that a young woman named Judith C. Waller was the right person to manage the station. He called her and said, “I’ve just bought a radio station; come down and run it.” Waller protested that she didn't know anything about running a station. Strong replied “neither do I, but come down and we’ll find out.” Waller was hired in February 1922. She went on to have a long and distinguished career in broadcasting. Strong was also an active participant in annual Radio Conferences organized by then US Secretary of Commerce Herbert Hoover in 1924 and 1925. As chairman of the National Radio Coordinating Committee, then an influential broadcasting trade association, Strong assisted Hoover in gaining passage of the Radio Act of 1927 – the first law that regulated radio broadcasting as a mass medium. In 1927, WMAQ become a charter affiliate of the Columbia Broadcasting System. In 1930 the station was organized as a separate corporation, Strong becoming chairman of the board of directors.

In the same year he launched the radio station, Strong established a corporation to build a paper mill in Chicago that used waste paper stock in the production of newsprint, under contract with the Daily News. This pioneering recycling initiative was in response to wartime shortages, which saw the price of paper (the single biggest expense for newspapers) more than double. Waterway Paper Products was located at Kedzie and 32nd Street. Strong was its president and Emanuel M. Mendelson the vice-president and Treasurer. Waterways Paper Products operated between 1923 and 1930, eventually producing some 30,000 tons of quality newsprint annually.

Victor Lawson died in August 1925, leaving no instructions in his will regarding the disposition of the Daily News. Strong spent the rest of the year raising the capital for a corporation he established to buy the Daily News in order to maintain Lawson's staff and preserve the paper's high journalistic standards. As a result of Strong's efforts, the paper was acquired by the Chicago Daily News Corporation, of which he was the major stockholder, for $13.5 million – the highest price paid for a newspaper up to that time.

Strong was the president and publisher of the Chicago Daily News Corporation from December 1925 until his death in May 1931. By the end of the 1920s, the paper had a circulation of 430,000, and claimed to employ over 14,000 people around the world. Strong continued his interest in broadcasting. The Daily News experimented with a mechanical television system, which had its inaugural telecast as W9XAP on August 27, 1930. The technology proved unworkable, but the experiment laid the groundwork for WMAQ-TV years later.

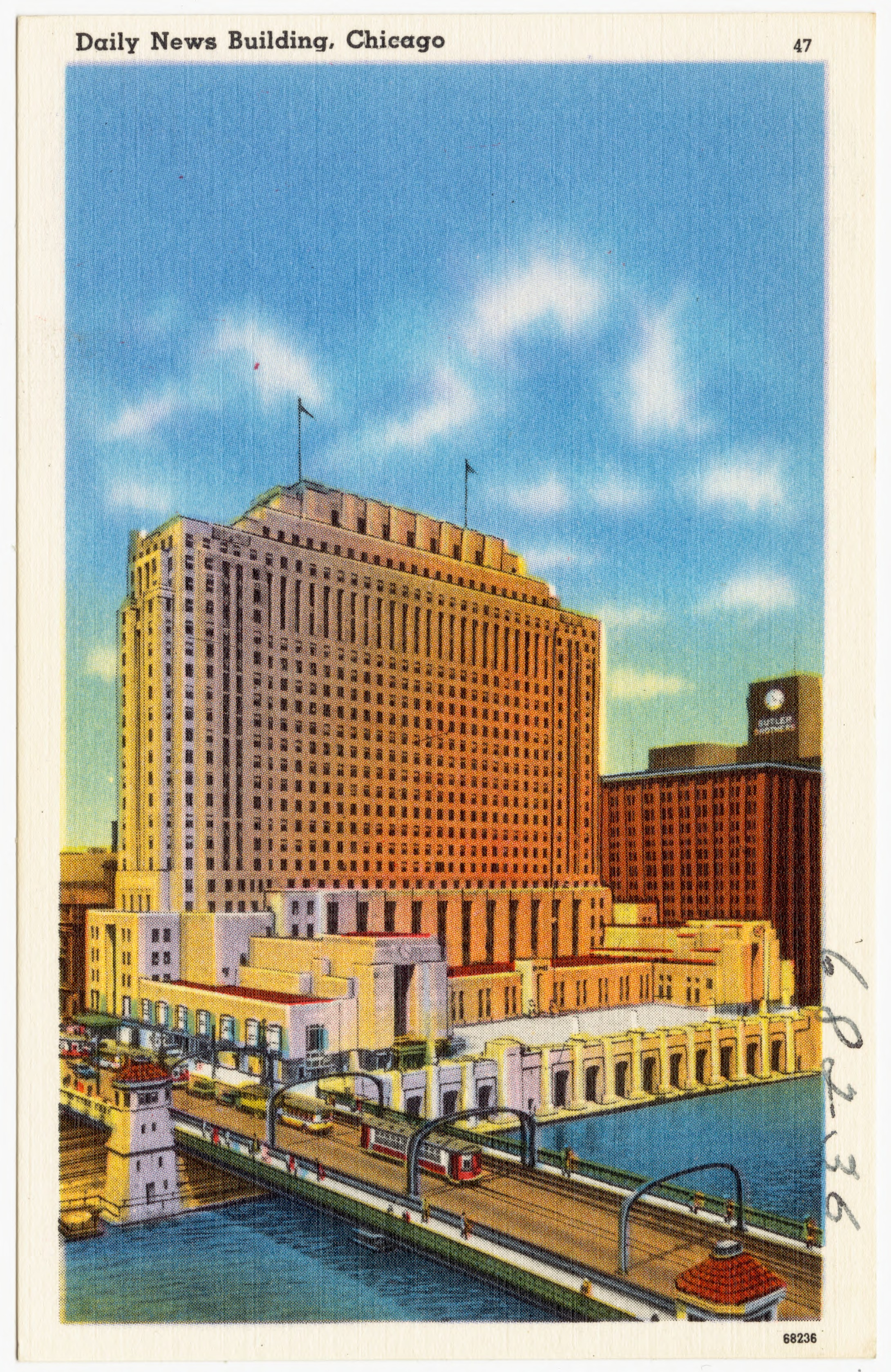
Daily News Building, Chicago

Once he became publisher, Strong took immediate steps to build a modern newspaper facility. Rejecting the parcel Lawson had chosen as too small, he instead acquired the air rights over railroad tracks that ran along west side of the river opposite the original site. At the time, air rights were still a novelty outside of New York City. Strong's friend Laird Bell represented the Chicago Daily News in the complicated negotiation over these rights (several different railroad companies were involved), and Strong's former law professor, Frank Loesch, represented the railroad companies. A year and one-half of meetings were required to reach an agreement between all parties. Once that was settled, Strong sold the parcel Lawson had reserved for the Daily News to the utility magnate Samuel Insull, with the understanding that he construct a building that would include a new home for the Chicago Civic Opera.

Strong commissioned Holabird & Root to design a modern structure with a large open-air plaza fronting the water. The building's bold design and Art Deco façade were widely regarded as a shot fired at the Chicago Tribune, which operated out of the Tribune Tower, a large Neo Gothic building on North Michigan Avenue which had been completed in 1925. Inside, the Daily News building featured a much-admired mural by John W. Norton and outside it had bas-reliefs depicting the history of journalism and a fountain honoring Victor Lawson. The ground-breaking ceremony was held in December 1927, and the Chicago Daily News Building was completed in June 1929. During the dedication ceremony, President Herbert Hoover pressed a button that started the presses. The building was twenty-six stories high, housed 2,000 Daily News employees and provided studio space for WMAQ. Although it has since been renamed Riverside Plaza, according to the Tribune’s architecture critic, the Daily News Building remains “one of Chicago's finest examples of Art Deco architecture and a path-breaking work of engineering and urban design.”

Strong also strengthened the newspaper's international news service, which had correspondents in twenty-seven foreign countries and maintained offices in London, Paris, Berlin, Beijing, and Moscow. He expanded the role of the paper's overseas staff, as well, to include facilitating diplomatic initiatives to promote world peace and arms control. For example, Daily News foreign correspondents assisted Salomon Levinson in his quest for an international treaty to make war illegal – an effort that culminated in August 1928, with the adoption of the Kellogg-Briand Pact. Strong also endorsed the peace-seeking initiative of the newspaper's senior foreign correspondent, Edward Price Bell, who succeeded in arranging a five-day meeting between President Hoover and Ramsay MacDonald, the Prime Minister of Great Britain at Rapidan Camp, Hoover's presidential retreat in northwestern Virginia in October 1929. This meeting initiated the process that led to adoption of the London Naval Treaty by Great Britain, Japan, France, Italy, and the United States in April 1930.

== Business and civic leadership ==
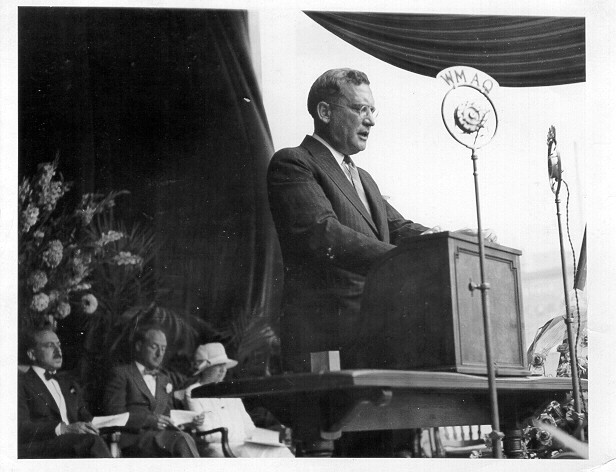
Walter Strong at the dedication of the Chicago Daily News Building. Courtesy Walter Ansel Strong Papers, The Newberry Library, Chicago.

In addition to being publisher of the Daily News, Strong was the president of the 100,000 Group, which brought together leaders of major U.S. newspapers for the purpose of growing and improving newspaper advertising. He was also a director of the Audit Bureau of Circulations, the American Newspaper Publishers Association, and the Associated Press. In 1930, he was elected chairman of the Advertising Federation of America. Strong gave many speeches on the state of the industry, including an address at the University of Chicago entitled “Newspapers and the New Age.” He was a crusader for honesty in advertising. In recognition of his efforts to promote high standards throughout the advertising industry, he was posthumously named to the Advertising Hall of Fame in 1949, the first year of such awards.

Strong was a long-serving trustee of his alma mater, Beloit College. In January 1931, four months prior to his death, he proposed to his fellow trustees that a stadium be built at Beloit's athletic field, presenting a small-scale model of his idea. After his death, his widow, Josephine W. Strong, donated funds to construct that stadium in his honor. Strong Stadium, which was designed by Mrs. Strong's brother architect Maurice Webster, was dedicated on October 13, 1934. It is still in use today.

Strong's tenure at the Daily News coincided with Prohibition in the United States. Chicago was racked with mob violence, much of it centering around Al Capone. The city seemed incapable of imposing law and order, in part because the Chicago Mayor Big Bill Thompson, who was supported by newspaper magnate William Randolph Hearst, maintained mutually beneficial relations with organized crime figures like Al Capone. Hearst published both a morning and an evening newspaper in Chicago at the time. When Thompson declined to run for re-election after two four-year terms as mayor, Strong was active in the successful mayoral campaign of William Emmett Dever, the Democratic Party candidate, a former alderman and judge who was an honest and able public servant. Although Dever served honorably for four years, he was defeated for re-election in 1927 by Thompson, who made a comeback with the support of the Hearst newspapers and anti-prohibition sentiment.

It was Strong's vision that the new Chicago Daily News building would become a symbol of renewed civic pride and an agency for a better future for the corruption-plagued, gangster-ridden city. But with the re-election of Thompson and his corrupt political associates, it was clear that to reach that vision, something had to be done before the completion of his new headquarters. In April 1928, with positive coverage and editorial support from the Chicago Daily News, Judge John A. Swanson overwhelmingly defeated the incumbent State's attorney for Cook County, an ally of Thompson. The so-called Pineapple Primary held before the election was marked by political violence – bombings and murder – culminating in the assassination of Octavius C. Granady, a black attorney and Thompson opponent who was a candidate for alderman. When criminal investigations by the lame-duck State's attorney proved fruitless, Strong's friend Frank Loesch was appointed special prosecutor to conduct an independent investigation of election crimes. Later that year, Loesch was elected President of the Chicago Crime Commission, a nonpartisan anti-crime organization he had helped to found in 1919.

After the notorious 1929 St. Valentine's Day Massacre, Strong decided to make a private appeal to his friend President Herbert Hoover for federal intervention to stem Chicago's lawlessness and corruption. A secret meeting was arranged at the White House, just two weeks after Hoover's inauguration. On March 19, 1929, Strong, joined by Frank Loesch and Laird Bell, made their case to the President. In his Memoir, Hoover described the meeting and its outcome.

In March, 1929, a committee of prominent Chicago citizens, under the leadership of Walter Strong, the publisher of the Daily News, and Judge Frank Loesch, president of the Chicago Crime Commission, called upon me to reveal the situation in that city. They gave chapter and verse for their statement that Chicago was in the hands of the gangsters, that the police and magistrates were completely under their control, that the governor of the state was futile, that the Federal government was the only force by which the city’s ability to govern itself could be restored. At once I directed that all the Federal agencies concentrate upon Mr. Capone and his allies.

This meeting launched a multi-agency attack on Chicago gangsters. Treasury and Justice Departments developed plans for income tax prosecutions against Chicago gangsters, and a small, elite squad of Prohibition Bureau agents (whose members included Eliot Ness) were deployed against bootleggers. In a city accustomed to corruption, these lawmen were incorruptible. Charles Schwarz, a writer for the Daily News, dubbed them The Untouchables. Strong played a key role in gathering and sharing intelligence on the Capone outfit and on other racketeering groups in Chicago. Sadly, Strong did not live long enough to witness Al Capone's conviction on federal tax evasion charges in June 1931.

== Personal life ==
Strong married Josephine Webster in 1913. The couple settled in Evanston, Illinois, initially living in a converted stable next to the home of his father-in-law Towner K. Webster. They had five children: Walter Ansel Jr. (1914), Jonathan Webster (1917), Robert Kitchell (1919), Anne Haviland (1922), and David Seymour (1925). David would later serve as an infantryman in France, dying in combat in November 1944, just prior to the Battle of the Bulge.

In 1926, shortly after becoming publisher of the Daily News, Strong traveled to Europe where he met with French Prime Minister Raymond Poincaré, and Italian Prime Minister Benito Mussolini. He returned in 1928 for a two-month tour of Europe with his wife, two older sons and members of the Webster family. During that time, he visited Daily News offices in Berlin, Paris, and London.

Walter Strong at Stronghold. Courtesy Strong Family Collection.

It was not uncommon for well-to-do Chicago families to have summer homes. In 1928, Strong bought 360 acres of wooded property in Oregon, Illinois which included a bluff overlooking the Rock River. He was familiar with the area because his father-in-law owned a nearby summer home that he and Josephine often visited. Strong hired his brother-in-law, Maurice Webster, to design a family home on the bluff. The original plan called for a simple barn and silo structure, but it quickly grew into something resembling a castle, with 16 bedrooms, 9 baths, 8 fireplaces and a Great Hall. The construction project, which continued into the Great Depression, lasted two years and cost $85,000.

The final design was influenced by Strong's travels to Europe, his English ancestry, and the historical novels of Sir Walter Scott. It had a Tudor style facade, a five-story tower with commanding views of the countryside, a circular library with a movable bookcase that revealed a secret passage, and a dining hall with an oak table so massive that it had to be installed before construction could be completed. The family called the place Stronghold and they spent their first summer there in 1930.

Walter Strong scarcely had time to enjoy Stronghold. On May 10, 1931, he died of a heart attack at his home in Winnetka, Illinois. He was 47 years old. Josephine continued to divide her time between her Winnetka home and Stronghold until her death in 1961. Stronghold was sold to the Presbyterian Church and functions today as a camp center and four-season retreat.
