= Henry Kitchell Webster =

American novelist

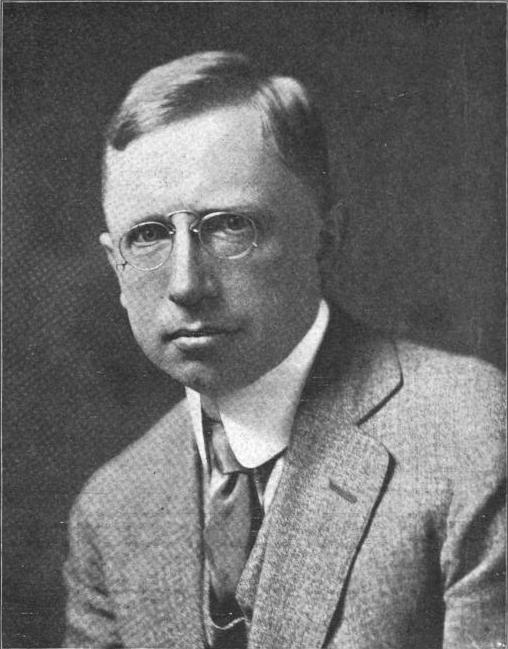
- Webster circa 1917
- Born: September 7, 1875; Evanston, Illinois
- Died: December 8, 1932 (aged 57); Evanston, Illinois
- Occupations: Novelist; short story writer; playwright
- Spouse: Mary Ward Orth Webster

Henry Kitchell Webster (September 7, 1875 – December 8, 1932) was an American who was one of the most popular serial writers in the country during the early twentieth century. He wrote novels and short stories on themes ranging from mystery to family drama to science fiction, and pioneered techniques for making books best sellers.

== Personal life ==
Henry Kitchell Webster was the oldest child of Chicago industrialist Towner K. Webster and Emma Josephine Kitchell. He graduated from Hamilton College in 1897 and taught rhetoric at Union College the following year. Otherwise, he lived most of his life in Evanston, Illinois. He married Mary Ward Orth, September 7, 1901. In 1910, after his earliest novels achieved success, he and Mary traveled around the world. The couple had three sons; Henry Kitchell Jr. (1905), Stokely (1912) who became a well-known impressionist painter, and Roderick (1915), who was Chairman of Adler Planetarium and benefactor of its Webster Institute. In 1922, the family spent a year living and traveling in Europe. They rented an apartment on the Rive Gauche in Paris, during which time Stokely studied painting with a family friend, the American artist Lawton S. Parker. Webster was friends with many actors and opera stars, including Ethel Barrymore who starred in his 1912 Broadway play June Madness.

In 1930, Webster wrote a memoir of his father which was published by his brother-in-law Walter A. Strong. In the summer of 1932, Webster was diagnosed with cancer. He died the following December at the age of 57. At the time of his death, Webster had partially completed a mystery, The Alleged Great-Aunt. His wife gave the manuscript to his friends Janet Ayer Fairbank and Margaret Ayer Barnes, who completed and published it in 1935.

== Popularity ==
He first achieved moderate recognition in 1899 when he co-wrote The Short Line War with fellow Illinois author Samuel Merwin, with whom he later collaborated to write one of his more famous works, Calumet "K" (1901). Calumet "K", which The Chicago Daily Tribune called "a vivifying romance of business," has maintained a modest level of popularity due to its status as Ayn Rand's favorite novel, a source of inspiration for her Objectivist philosophy. Webster's novels The Real Adventure (1916) and An American Family: A Novel of Today (1918) both received critical praise upon release, and the former novel was made into a silent film in 1922. By the time of his death, Webster had become one of the most popular authors of magazine serials in America, and "was largely instrumental in the great literary revolution of the generation, making best books 'best sellers'".

== Writing habits and style ==
Webster's tales were often either set in Chicago, his "favorite literary locale," or in a fictitious urban location in the Midwest. Webster usually released even his novels in serial form first, and he purposely straddled the line between popular "pot-boiler" fiction and longer, more ambitious works. He wrote an average of 2,000 words per day, at several points in his career reaching 60,000 words in as little as three weeks. While producing such an enormous volume of text, Webster would decide which pieces were worthy of bearing his name and which should be released under a pseudonym. His favorite pen name was O. C. Cabot, which was tobacco spelled backwards. He asserted (anonymously) in The Saturday Evening Post that most authors must knowingly churn out large quantities of possibly inferior fiction in order to "make a living by literature." Plenty of Webster's work did bear his name, however, and under that name, he published twenty-nine novels, a play and hundreds of short stories.
