= Samuel Merwin (writer) =

American writer (1874–1936

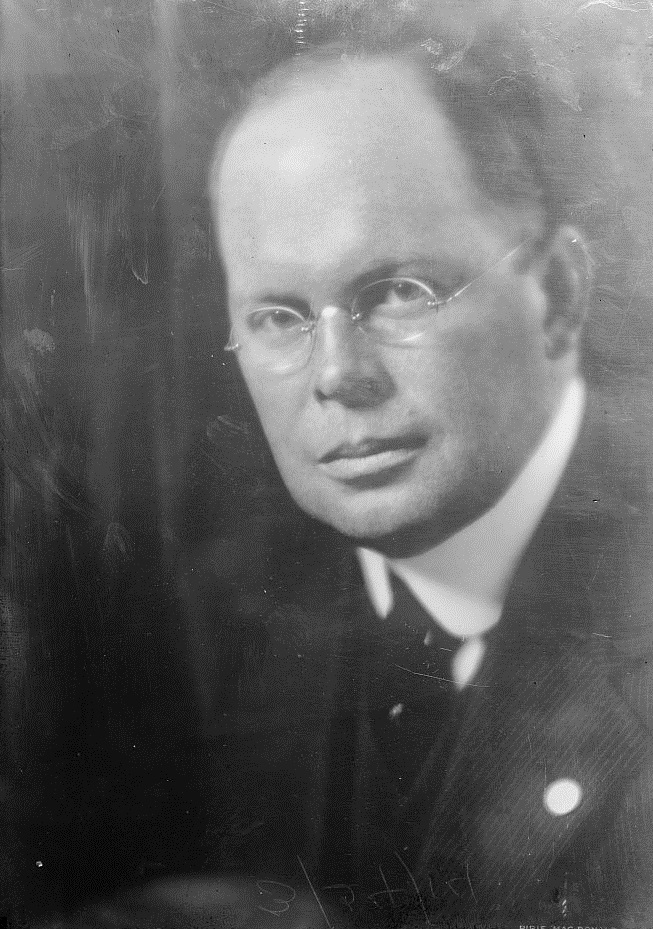
- Born: October 6, 1874; Evanston, Illinois, U.S.
- Died: October 17, 1936 (aged 62); The Player's Club; Manhattan, New York City, New York), U.S.
- Education: Northwestern University
- Occupations: Novelist, playwright

Samuel Merwin, Sr. (October 6, 1874 – October 17, 1936) was an American writer, including novelist and playwright.

== Biography ==
Merwin was born on October 6, 1874, in Evanston, Illinois, to Ella B. and Orlando H. Merwin. His father was the postmaster of Evanston.

In 1901, Merwin married Edna Earl Fleshiem. The couple had two sons, Samuel Kimball Merwin, Jr. and Banister Merwin, and one adopted son, John Merwin.

After attending Northwestern University, he worked between 1905 and 1911 as associate editor and then editor of Success magazine. In 1907, the magazine sent him to China to investigate the China's opium trade.

=== Death ===
He died of a stroke while dining at The Player's Club in Manhattan on October 17, 1936.

== Publications ==
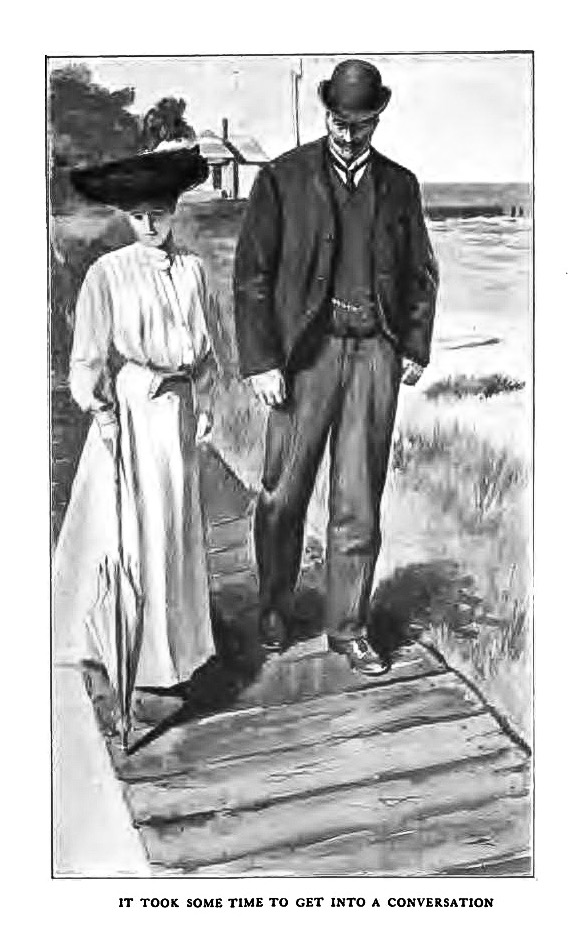
Illustration by Alonzo Kimball in Merwin's 1903 novel His Little World: The Story of Hunch Badeau

- The Short Line War (1899) with Henry Kitchell Webster
- Calumet "K" (1901) with Henry Kitchell Webster
- The Road to Frontenac: A Romance of Early Canada (1901)
- The Whip Hand (1903)
- His Little World: The Story of Hunch Badeau (1903)
- The Merry Anne (1904)
- The Road Builders (1905)
- Comrade John (1907) with Henry Kitchell Webster
- Drugging a Nation. (1908)
- The Citadel: A Romance of Unrest (1912)
- Anthony the Absolute (1914)
- The Charmed Life of Miss Austin (1914)
- The Honey Bee: A Story of a Woman in Revolt (1915)
- The Trufflers (1916)
- Temperamental Henry: An Episodic History of the Early Life and the Young Loves of Henry Calverly, 3rd (1917)
- Henry Is Twenty: A Further Episodic History of Henry Calverly, 3rd (1918)
- The Passionate Pilgrim: Being the Narrative of an Oddly Dramatic Year in the Life of Henry Calverly, 3rd (1919)
- Hills of Han: A Romantic Incident (1919)
- In Red and Gold (1921)
- Goldie Green (1922)
- Hattie of Hollywood (serialized in Photoplay, July–December 1922)
- Silk : A Legend as Narrated in the Journals and Correspondence of Jan Po (1923)
- The Moment of Beauty (1925)
- The Entertaining Angel (1926)
- "Old Concord, Seen through Western Spectacles" (1926)
- Anabel at Sea (1927)
- Lady Can Do (1929)
- Bad Penny (1933)
- Rise and Fight Againe: The Story of a Life-Long Friend (1935)
