= Stokely Webster =

American painter

Stokely Webster (1912–2001) was best known as an American impressionist painter who studied in Paris. His paintings can be found in the permanent collections of many museums, including the Metropolitan Museum of Art in New York, the National Museum of American Art, the Smithsonian Institution, the White House, Gracie Mansion in New York, the Senate Office Building, and the Museum of the City of New York.

== Youth ==
Stokely Webster was born in Evanston, Illinois. His parents were the noted author Henry Kitchell Webster and Mary Ward Orth. As a child, he spent his summers at Bee Tree Farm, the family retreat built by his grandfather, industrialist Towner K. Webster. He credited his time at that “magical place” with shaping his world view and future painting. One of his earliest works, “Willows and Sky,” was painted at the Farm when he was 17 years old.

As a youth, he traveled with his family to Paris, France where he was enthralled by the paintings of the French impressionists and post-impressionists and embarked on his own fledgling efforts at plein-air cityscapes. In 1922 he spent a year in France where he saw Monet at work in his Giverny garden and viewed his paintings at the Luxembourg Palace. He decided at that time to be a painter. His first studies were with family friend Lawton S. Parker, an American artist who had studied with Jean-Léon Gérôme and James McNeill Whistler. He taught young Webster the century-old traditions of painting, generally accepted up until World War II.

After returning to America in 1924, he dedicated the next ten years to educating himself through a succession of art-school courses, studying architecture at Yale University and spending two years in Chicago, Illinois working as a textile designer.

Webster was a student at Columbia University, National Academy of Design, and the Yale School of Fine Arts.

== Maturity ==
In 1933, he married renowned ballerina and satirical dancer Iva Kitchell.

In 1936 he studied for six months with Robert Henri's disciple Wayman Adams, learning portrait painting and landscape technique, which combined the high-valued colors of impressionism with the methods of Henri and John Singer Sargent. A one-man exhibition, which opened in New York the same year he completed the painting, Times Square, drew praise from The New York Sun, "Mr. Webster paints in the way that at one time was thought the only way to paint, using the flowing strokes and well-thinned-out pigments that came to us through Sargent via Frans Hals and Velasquez." A reviewer for the New York Herald Tribune endorsed that opinion, comparing Webster's technical skills to those of Sargent, while others praised his expertise at capturing the momentary impression of a place and his exceptionally convincing and precise use of light as the force defining its mood, climate, and urban disposition. Webster's joy at this reception, which buttressed his ambition to focus on painting full-time, was savored only briefly. The outbreak of World War II had soon shifted him to the assembly line at Grumman Aircraft Corporation, leading to his pursuit of an engineering degree at Columbia University and seven years of steady employment designing airplanes.

He returned to painting in 1948, having sublet a spacious studio, formerly owned by George Luks, in Manhattan. A fire ravaged this building four years later, however, destroying more than sixty of his canvases and cheating Webster of his successful re-entry into the city's art world. The incident prompted him to relocate to Huntington, Long Island, where he became involved as a designer, and then president, of a gyroscope manufacturing company. Webster's creative inclinations eventually lured him back into active painting, and the decades of the 1960s and 1970s saw him creating both landscapes and figural studies and exhibiting that work internationally in an array of salons and galleries. During this time, Webster's paintings were acquired by, or donated to, museums in the United States.

During the 1960s, he painted many portraits of his wife, Iva, as well as his daughter, Stephanie (dancer, who later married novelist Martin Brooks), and his granddaughter, Kathryn (novelist and photographer K. S. Brooks).

In 1983, Webster and his wife took up residence in Flagler Beach, Florida after many years as Long Island, New York residents. Mrs. Webster died later that year. He remarried in May 1984 to long-time friend Audrey Coutant and relocated to Southport, Connecticut. His commitment to painting lyrical seascapes and city scenes in an impressionist manner continued unabated, and museum exhibitions featuring recent work by the artist were still being organized into the mid-1990s.

Webster traveled to Boston in May 1993 to attend the National Invitational exhibit State of the Art ’93, sponsored by the New England Fine Arts Institute, as both he, and his granddaughter, K.S. Brooks, were exhibiting works at the same show.

Two books were published about Stokely Webster during his life: Stokely Webster Paintings, 1923-1984, published in 1985 by the Museum of Arts and Sciences, Daytona Beach, Florida; and Stokely Webster and his Paris…New York, London and Venice published in 2001 by Connecticut River Press.

Webster died in 2001, in Southport, Connecticut.
