= Jonathan Strong (author) =

American author

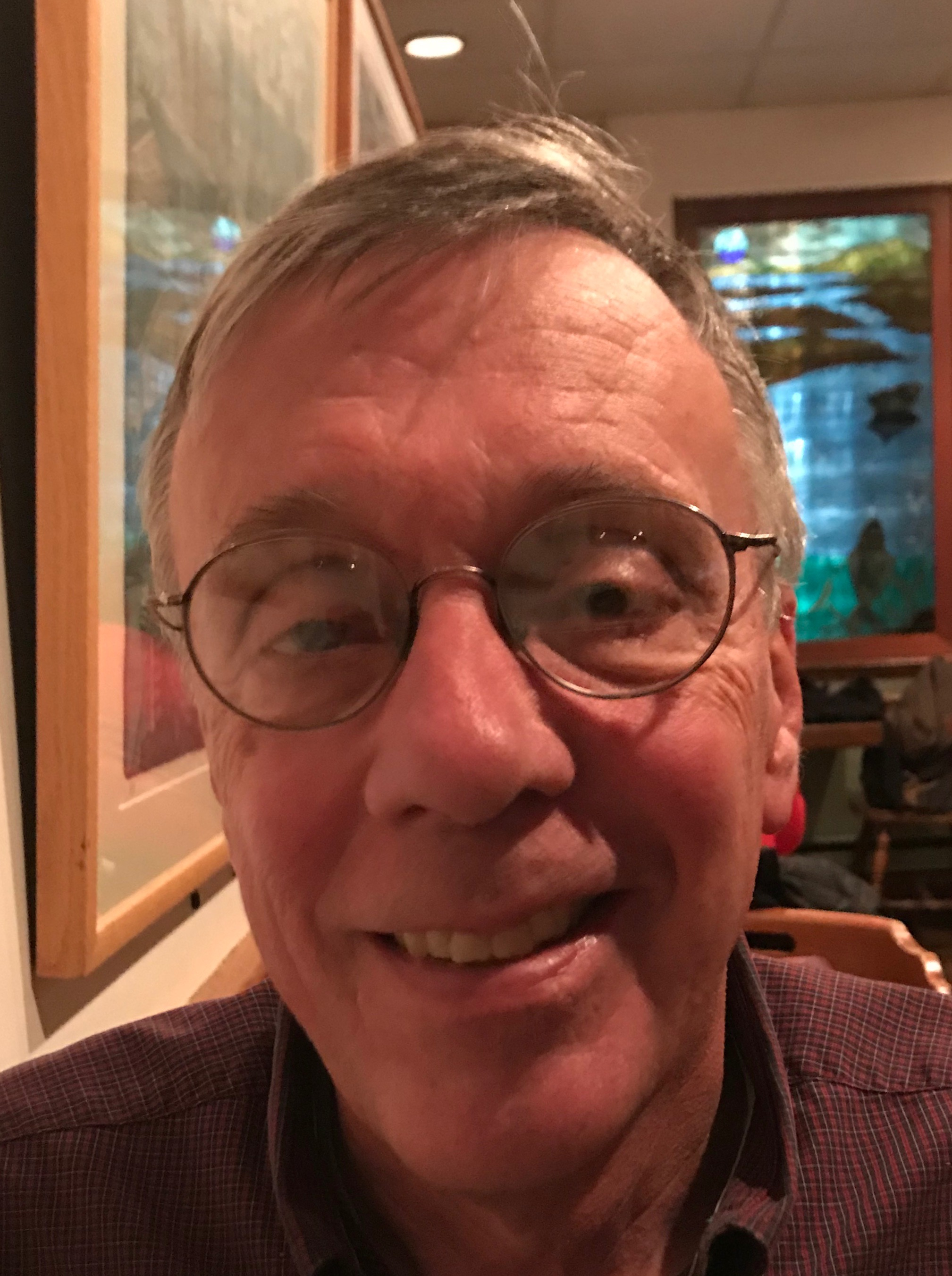
- Born: August 13, 1944
- Occupation: American Author

Jonathan Strong (born 1944) is an American author of novels and short stories.

== Personal life ==
Jonathan Strong was born in 1944. He was raised in Winnetka, Illinois, where he attended North Shore Country Day School. He enrolled at Harvard University in 1962, but dropped out in the middle of his senior year as his writing career advanced. He returned to Harvard and earned his bachelor's degree in 1969. That year, he began his long career teaching fiction-writing at Tufts University. Strong lives in Rockport, Massachusetts, and West Corinth, Vermont.

== Written work ==
Strong's first short story, "Supperburger," was published in the Parisian Review (1966). The following year it won an O. Henry Award. It has since been analogized and, according to literary critic James Morrison, has become "a kind of classic in gay fiction." Strong's first novel, Tike and Five Short Stories (1968), won the American Academy of Arts and Letters' Rosenthal Award. In 1970, Strong's short story "Patients," published in The Atlantic Monthly, won another O. Henry Award. Strong published his second novel, Ourselves, in 1971. Annie Gottlieb, a reviewer for The New York Times, called it "probably the best book yet to come out of my generation." After those early successes, it was fourteen years until Strong published another novel, although he continued to publish stories in periodicals including Esquire and Shenandoah.

His reappearance as a novelist begin with Elsewhere (1985). Strong's next six novels were published with Zoland Books; Secret Words (1993), Companion Pieces (1993), An Untold Tale (1993), Offspring (1995), The Old World (1997), and A Circle Around Her (2000). Zoland stopped publishing new books in 2001. His more recent works, all with small presses, include Drawn from Life (2008), Consolation (2010), More Light (2011), Hawkweed and Indian Paintbrush (2013), The Judge's House (2015), Quit the Race (2017), and Four Last Songs (2020). In a 2011 interview, Morrison said that Strong was "among the most underrated writers in the country."
