= Chicago Daily News =

American afternoon daily newspaper (1875–1978)

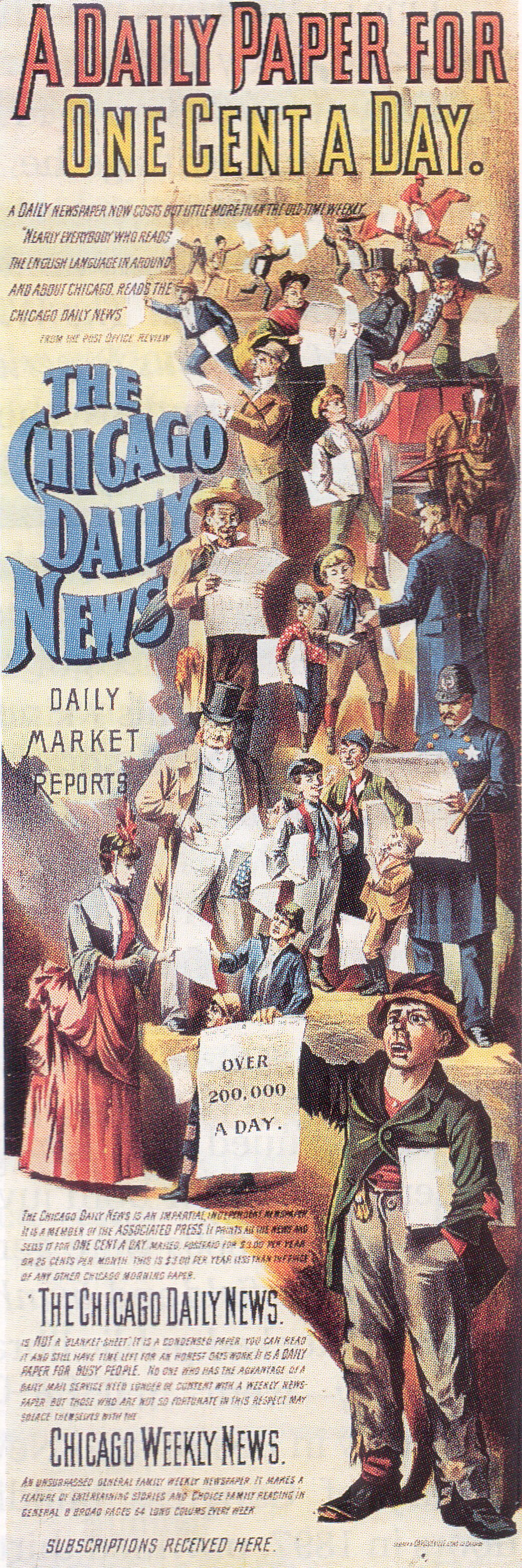
- 1901 adverting poster
- Type: Daily newspaper
- Format: Broadsheet
- Owners: Field Enterprises (1959–1978); Knight Newspapers (1925–1959); Victor Lawson (1876–1925)
- Founders: Melville E. Stone; Percy Meggy; William Dougherty
- Founded: 1875
- Ceased publication: 1978
- Headquarters: (1959–1978); 401 North Wabash (1929–1959); 400 West Madison
- City: Chicago, Illinois
- Country: United States

The Chicago Daily News was an afternoon daily newspaper in the midwestern United States, published between 1875 and 1978 in Chicago, Illinois.

== History ==
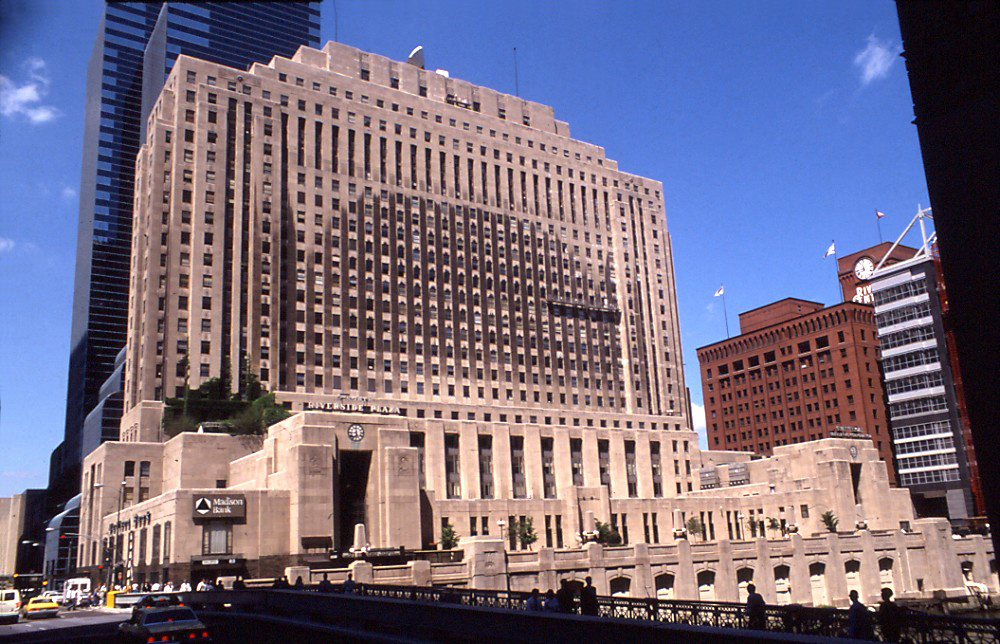
Daily News Building

The Daily News was founded by Melville E. Stone, Percy Meggy, and William Dougherty in 1875 and began publishing on December 23. Byron Andrews, fresh out of Hobart College, was one of the first reporters. The paper aimed for a mass readership in contrast to its primary competitor, the Chicago Tribune, which appealed to the city's elites. The Daily News was Chicago's first penny paper, and the city's most widely read newspaper in the late nineteenth century. Victor Lawson bought the Chicago Daily News in 1876 and became its business manager. Stone remained involved as an editor and later bought back an ownership stake, but Lawson took over full ownership again in 1888.

=== Independent newspaper ===
During his long tenure at the Daily News, Victor Lawson pioneered many areas of reporting, opening one of the first foreign bureaus among U.S. newspapers in 1898. In 1912, the Daily News became one of a cooperative of four newspapers, including the New York Globe, The Boston Globe, and the Philadelphia Bulletin, to form the Associated Newspapers syndicate. In 1922, Lawson started one of the first columns devoted to radio. He also introduced many innovations to business operations including advances in newspaper promotion, classified advertising, and syndication of news stories, serials, and comics.

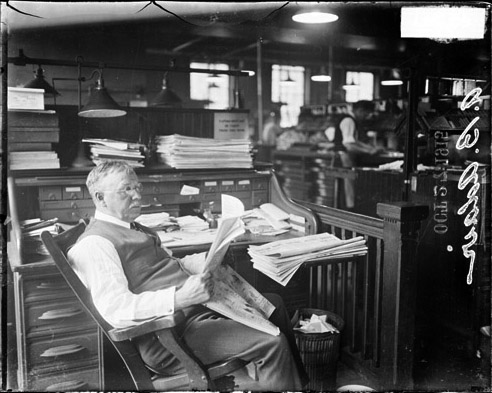
Editor A. B. Blair 1915

Victor Lawson died in August 1925, leaving no instructions in his will regarding the disposition of the Daily News. Walter A. Strong, who was Lawson's business manager, spent the rest of the year raising the capital he needed to buy the Daily News. The Chicago Daily News Corporation, of which Strong was the major stockholder, bought the newspaper for $13.7 million (equivalent to $251 million in 2025)—the highest price paid for a newspaper up to that time. Strong was the president and publisher of the Chicago Daily News Corporation from December 1925 until his death in May 1931.

As Lawson's business manager, Strong partnered with the Fair Department Store to create a new radio station. Strong asked Judith C. Waller to run the new station. When Waller protested that she didn't know anything about running a station. Strong replied "neither do I, but come down and we'll find out." Waller was hired in February 1922 and went on to have a long and distinguished career in broadcasting. What would become WMAQ had its inaugural broadcast April 12, 1922.

That same year, the rival Chicago Tribune began to experiment with radio news at Westinghouse-owned KYW. In 1924 the Tribune briefly took over station WJAZ, changing its call letters to WGN, then purchased station WDAP outright and permanently transferred the WGN call letters to this second station.

The Daily News would eventually take full ownership of the station and absorb shared band rival WQJ, which was jointly owned by the Calumet Baking Powder Company and the Rainbo Gardens ballroom. WMAQ would pioneer many firsts in radio—one of them the first complete Chicago Cubs season broadcast on radio in 1925, hosted by sportswriter-turned-sportscaster Hal Totten. In April 1930, WMAQ was organized as a subsidiary corporation with Walter Strong as its chairman of the board, and Judith Waller as vice president and station manager.

On August 2, 1929, it was announced that the Chicago Daily Journal was consolidating with the Daily News, and the Journal published its final issue on August 21.

By the late 1920s, it was apparent to Walter Strong that his newspaper and broadcast operations needed more space. He acquired the air rights over the railroad tracks that ran along the west side of the Chicago River. He commissioned architects Holabird & Root to design a modern building over the tracks that would have newspaper production facilities and radio studios. The 26-floor Chicago Daily News Building opened in 1929. It featured a large plaza with a fountain dedicated to Strong's mentor, Victor Lawson, and a mural by John W. Norton depicting the newspaper production process. The Art Deco structure became a Chicago landmark, and stands today under the name Riverside Plaza.

In 1930, the radio station obtained a license for an experimental television station, W9XAP, but had already begun transmitting from it just prior to its being granted. Working with Sears Roebuck stores by providing them with the receivers, those present at the stores were able to see Bill Hay, (the announcer for Amos 'n' Andy), present a variety show from the Daily News Building, on August 27, 1930. Ulises Armand Sanabria was the television pioneer behind this and other early Chicago television experiments. In 1931 The Daily News sold WMAQ to NBC.

In its heyday as an independent newspaper from the 1930s to 1950s the Daily News was widely syndicated and boasted a first-class foreign news service. It became known for its distinctive, aggressive writing style which 1920s editor Henry Justin Smith likened to a daily novel. This style became the hallmark of the newspaper: "For generations", as Wayne Klatt puts it in Chicago Journalism: A History, "newspeople had been encouraged to write on the order of Charles Dickens, but the Daily News was instructing its staff to present facts in cogent short paragraphs, which forced rivals to do the same." In the 1950s, city editor Clement Quirk Lane (whose son John would become Walter Cronkite's executive producer) issued a memo to the staff that has become something of a memorial of the paper's house style, a copy of which can be found on Lane's entry.

=== Knight Newspapers and Field Enterprises ===
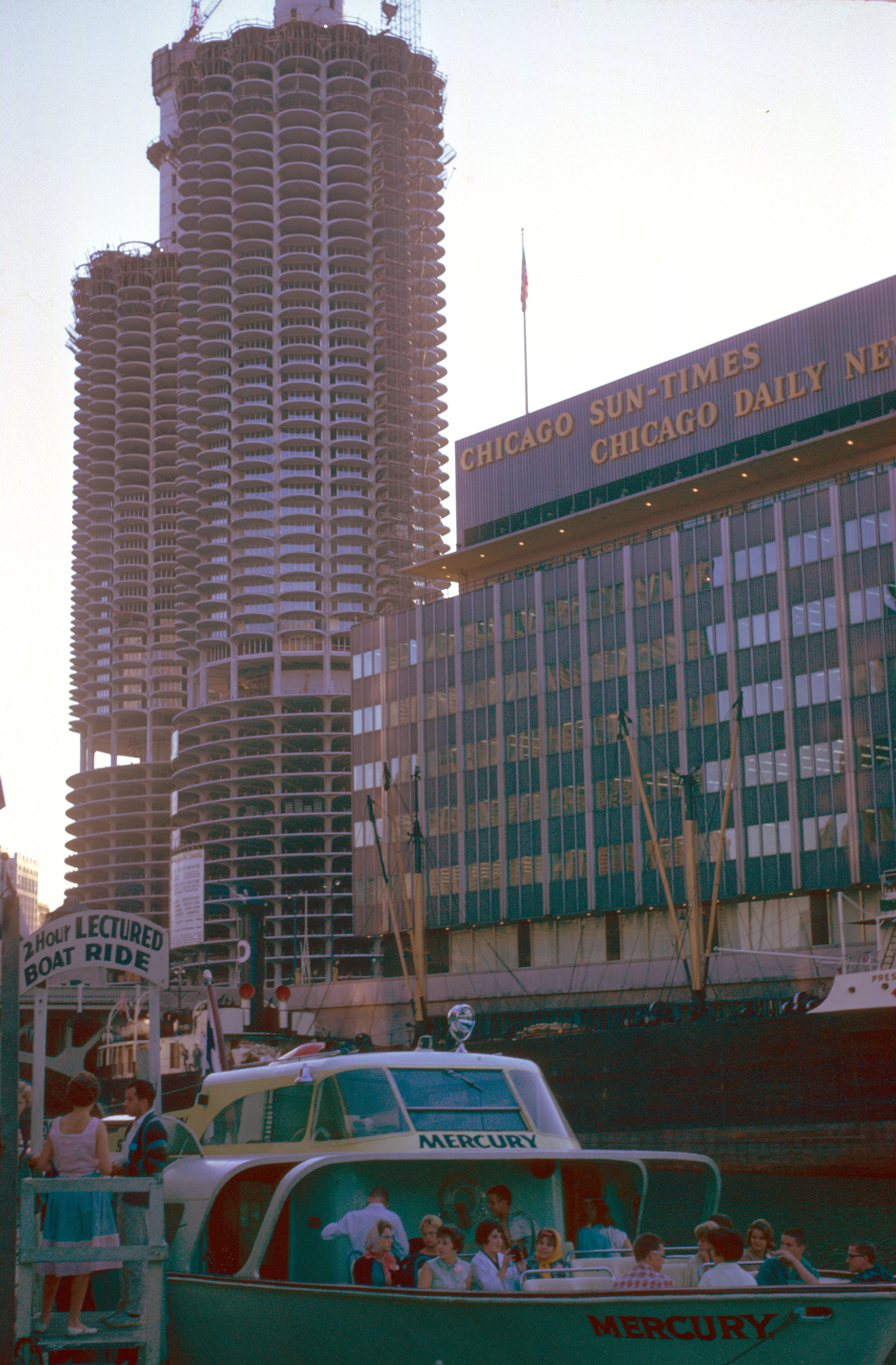
Sun-Times and Daily News headquarters

After a long period of ownership by Knight Newspapers (later Knight Ridder), the paper was acquired in 1959 by Field Enterprises, owned by heirs of the former owner of the Marshall Field and Company department store chain. Field already owned the morning Chicago Sun-Times, and the Daily News moved into the Sun-Times' building on North Wabash Avenue. A few years later Mike Royko became the paper's lead columnist, and quickly rose to local and national prominence. However, the Field years were mostly a period of decline for the newspaper, partly due to management decisions but also due to demographic changes; the circulation of afternoon dailies generally declined with the rise of television, and downtown newspapers suffered as readers moved to the suburbs.

In 1977 the Daily News was redesigned and added features intended to increase its appeal to younger readers, but the changes did not reverse the paper's continuing decline in circulation. The Chicago Daily News published its last edition on Saturday, March 4, 1978.

As reported in The Wall Street Journal, later in 1978, Lloyd H Weston, president, editor and publisher of Addison Leader Newspapers, Inc., a group of weekly tabloids in the west and northwest suburbs—obtained rights to the Chicago Daily News trademark. Under a new corporation, CDN Publishing Co., Inc., based in DuPage County, Weston published a number of special editions of the Chicago Daily News, including one celebrating the Chicago Auto Show.

The following year, a Rosemont-based group headed by former Illinois governor Richard B. Ogilvie contracted to purchase CDN Publishing, with the expressed intention of publishing the Chicago Daily News as a weekend edition beginning that August. Weston hosted a party celebrating the signing of the contract with Ogilvie at the iconic Pump Room in the Ambassador Chicago Hotel. The gala was attended by hundreds of the city's well-known names in politics, publishing, broadcasting and advertising.

The next day, Ogilvie reneged on the deal. The check he signed as payment to Weston bounced and his corporation filed for federal bankruptcy protection.

Weston's last edition of the Chicago Daily News featured extensive photo coverage of the October 4, 1979, visit to Chicago of Pope John Paul II.

In 1984, Weston sold his rights to the Chicago Daily News trademark to Rupert Murdoch, who, at the time, was owner and publisher of the Chicago Sun-Times.

The headquarters of the Daily News and Sun-Times was located at 401 North Wabash before the building was demolished. It is now the site of Trump International Hotel and Tower.

== Pulitzer Prizes ==
The Chicago Daily News was awarded the Pulitzer Prize thirteen times.

- 1925 Reporting
- 1929 Correspondence
- 1933 Correspondence
- 1938 Editorial Cartooning
- 1943 Reporting
- 1947 Editorial Cartooning
- 1950 Meritorious Public Service
- 1951 International Reporting
- 1957 Meritorious Public Service
- 1963 Meritorious Public Service
- 1969 Editorial Cartooning
- 1970 National Reporting
- 1972 Commentary
