= PLA Navy landing barges =

Chinese naval ships

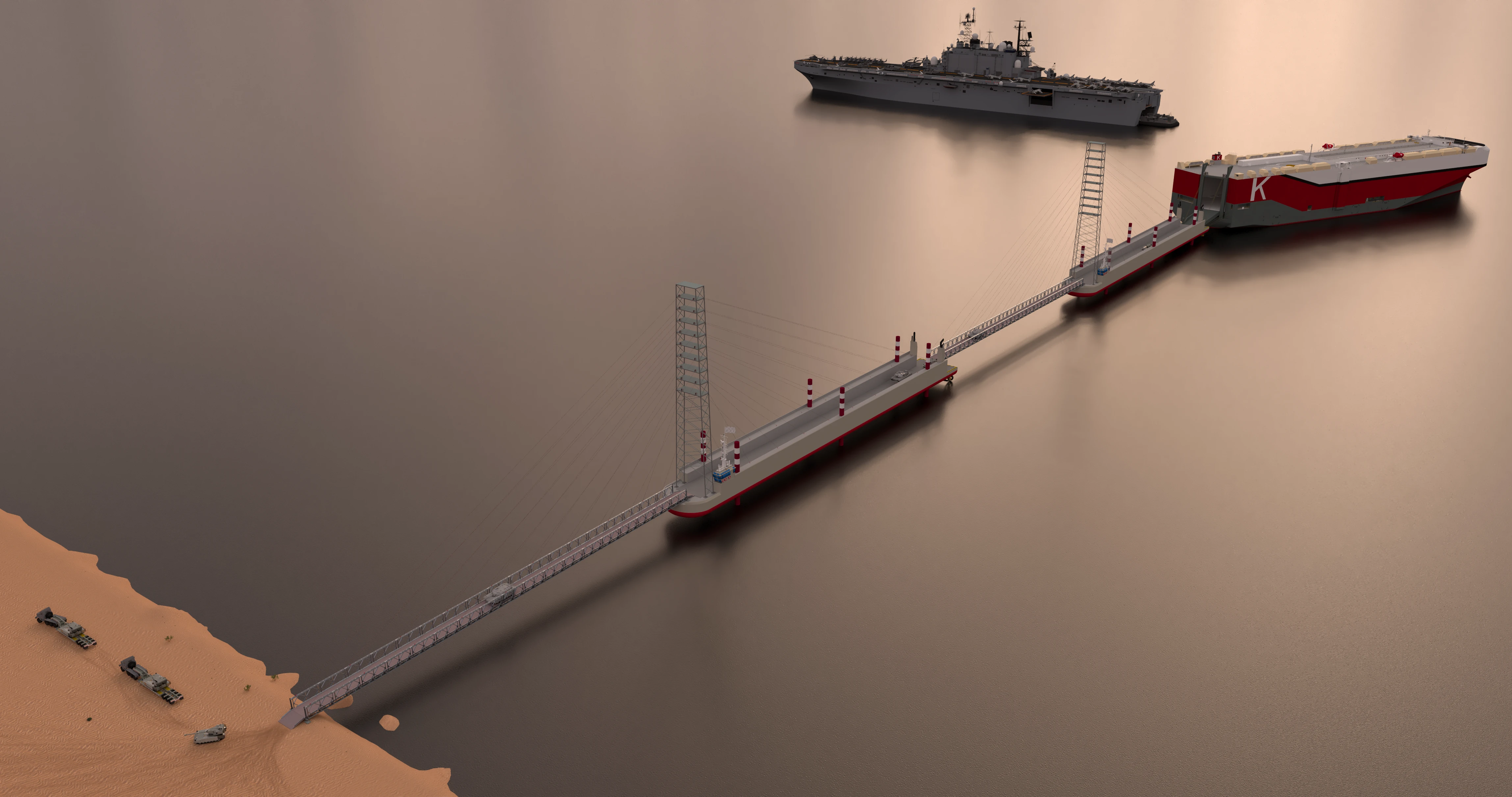
An artist's impression of the concept

The Shuiqiao (水桥 ― water bridge) class (not an official name) of amphibious assault barges have been built for China's People's Liberation Army Navy by COMEC. A set of three barges is used to form an extended causeway and pier from deep water to land. Two sets have been observed and the first set was observed undergoing sea trials in March 2025.

The design of the barges incorporates a Bailey bridge. Three of the barges were observed and first written about publicly in the Guangzhou Shipyard in January 2025, but were known about by other analysts in August 2024 and not publicly released. Satellite imagery showed the barges being tested off China's south coast in March 2025. The barges put down legs on the sea floor to form a stable platform and then extend the bridges to form a pier and causeway.

The barges have been speculatively linked to a potential future invasion of Taiwan by the People's Republic of China as part of its plan for Chinese unification. The website Naval News wrote that a consensus among naval analysts is that the barges would be used for amphibious landings and that the barges allow "China to pick new landing sites and complicate attempts to organize defences" and could land tanks to a coastal road instead of heavily defended beaches.

A 19-second video of the barges on Zhanjiang beach was uploaded to WeChat but subsequently disappeared. A March 2025 article in The Guardian described them as Shuiqiao ships. Andrew Erickson, a professor of strategy at the China Maritime Studies Institute said that the barges were "purpose-built for a Taiwan invasion scenario" and that they embodied "the seriousness with which China under Xi [Jinping] is pursuing absorption of Taiwan by any means possible".

== See also ==
- Mulberry harbours – floating harbours used by the British for the invasion of Normandy
- Mobile offshore base
- Jackup rig
- Lily and Clover - floating airstrip
- Very large floating structure
