= Donald Innis =

American architect

Donald Alywn Innis (born in 1931 in Olean, New York) is an American architect based in San Diego, California. Innis is also an inventor and engineer and has pioneered the idea of floating real estate, specifically the notion of a floating airport using pneumatic stabilized platform (PSP) technology which he has developed and patented through his company, Float Incorporated. Innis designed several notable San Diego landmarks, including the 1970s remodeling of the San Diego Broadway Pier (one of the first pier designs to make use of significant above water landscaping and greenery), the master plan for the San Diego Embarcadero, and Terminal 1 of San Diego International Airport. He is a long-standing member of the American Institute of Architects.

== Early life ==
Innis is the middle son of Greta Matson Innis (Swedish-American, b. 1905, d. 1965) and Alwyn Osman Innis (American, b. 1896, d. 1974). His father Alwyn was an American-born RCAF squadron leader during WWII and a young American foreign exchange fighter pilot ranked as a Second Lieutenant in the British RFC's No. 46 Squadron during the final years of World War I. Donald Innis' father, Alwyn Osman Innis, had trained at Canada's RFC camp at Bourden before being commissioned and sent to England. Innis' father returned to the U.S. when he left the RFC (then the RAF) in 1919 to become vice president and general manager of the Columbus Aviation Company. Innis' father, Alwyn, would work for the S.S. Kresge dime stores, opening and managing several all across the country, including in Olean, New York, where son Donald Innis was born in 1931. A.O. Innis would later move to Chicago, Illinois, to open his own dimes stores, Alywn Stores, only to close them several years later to re-join the RCAF during World War II and moving the entire family to Toronto, Ontario, Canada. After WWII, the Innis family would move back to Chicago, Illinois, and then ultimately to San Diego, California.

== Career ==
=== Early career ===
Donald A. Innis attended the University of Illinois in Chicago for one year before becoming a salesman and taking part in the racing of midget cars for Four Wheels Inc. (a Chicago auto leasing firm). Innis would race midget and stock cars on the quarter-mile track at Soldier Field in downtown Chicago and would sell used cars for the company. Innis then moved to Tucson, where he briefly attended the University of Arizona.

Innis then worked for Chicago architect Maurice Webster, (b Sept. 20, 1892; d May 17, 1982, Evanston, IL.) who with architect Alfred P. Allen designed Chicago's Sky Harbor Airport, which had originally opened in 1929 just north of Chicago. Webster also designed Stronghold Castle, a replica of a European castle which was built by Walter Strong, then publisher of the Chicago Daily News. It is now a conference center owned by the local presbytery of the Presbyterian Church.

Innis later moved to California with his brother, artist, and writer Joe. Donald Innis worked his way up the ladder at Falkon Booth, becoming a draftsman and then drafting designer, when around 1956 he received notice that he had been drafted by the U. S. Army.

Innis had previously served seven and a half years in the Navy Reserve, beginning shortly after high school. Innis' was recruited by the U.S. Army Signal Corp's Alaska Communications System (ACS) and was stationed on an Army operated cable ship in Alaska. Innis oversaw the laying of thousands of miles of the first military submarine telephone communication cables across the ocean using secret military charts aboard the wooden-hulled self-propelled barge, the cable ship Col. Basil O. Lenoir. Innis' top secret job required him to enter a room "like Oz" and close curtains around him while he read the secret charts of where U.S. military communications cables would be laid at sea.

After serving in the Signal Corps, Innis obtained an early release and entered U.C. Berkeley's architecture program in 1958. While studying at Berkeley, Innis taught sailing at the U.C. Berkeley sailing club at Berkeley Yacht Harbor and often sailed with Hans Albert Einstein (son of physicist Albert Einstein), a professor of hydraulic engineering, who was teaching at the university at the time. Innis graduated from Cal in 1961.

=== Career highlights ===
In 1961, Innis joined the San Diego–based architecture firm of Paderewski Mitchell and Dean, AIA, as chief designer. While working for C. J. "Pat" Paderewski, Innis was in charge of designing the current Terminal One at the San Diego Airport (constructed in 1967). Paderewski (then called San Diego's "Mr. Architect") had famously designed the first exterior all-glass elevator for San Diego's El Cortez Hotel (the elevator has since been demolished). Paderewski was also president of the San Diego Chapter of the American Institute of Architects, which Innis would also later head.

In 1965, Innis decided to form his own firm, Donald Innis & Associates. In 1966, Innis submitted the winning proposal in a competition for a design for new Balboa Park arcades, a design featuring simple arches. The winning proposal plan was not realized by Innis’ firm, but a year later the plan was awarded to another firm.

In 1966, Innis was joined by fellow architect Dave Tennebaum, and the firm was renamed Innis-Tennebaum Architects Inc., AIA. For more than three decades Innis-Tennebaum Architects specialized in military contracts and the building of elementary schools, residential, commercial and other architectural projects. Noteworthy projects in and around San Diego included the original San Diego Embarcadero redesign and master plan (the bay front area and docks next to the San Diego Airport between Harbor Island and downtown San Diego), Del Mar's Flower Hill Mall (built in 1977 for the Fletcher family) which included an underground restaurant, East Village Mall (Rancho Santa Fe), a total overhaul and remodeling of the historic Broadway Pier in the 1970s, adding new innovative structures (and preserving the view of the bay all the way down Broadway Street), The Harbor Seafood Mart at the Embarcadero, and the redesign of the Red Sails Inn on Shelter Island. The Broadway Pier that Innis designed was configured so that a person looking down Broadway could still see the bay (this is no longer the case with the new remodeled structure that was built in its place in 2010). Its innovative original 1970s design also originally featured planter boxes with trees and foliage, which was one of the first of its type of above-water structures to do this. The pier was featured as a location in the 1979 film Hardcore directed by Paul Schrader and starring George C. Scott (standing in as Los Angeles) and was also the location for the big, splashy 2003 premiere party for the Academy Award-winning Russell Crowe film Master and Commander: The Far Side of the World, a film directed by Peter Weir. Unfortunately in 2010, the Broadway Pier building that Innis designed was demolished and a less aesthetically appealing boxy, modern cruise ship terminal was erected in its place.

In 1992, Innis retired from Innis-Tennebaum to create Float Inc. and pursue his dream project of a floating airport.

=== Floating Airport ===
While designing terminal one of San Diego's Lindberg airport, Innis realized that the airport could not expand to meet future needs while at its current location. A new airport site would need to be close to the current airport and population centers and accessible. There was only one answer. It would need to be built on the water. To achieve a platform large enough to operate an international airport (about 1,200 acres), the technology needed to be invented to float that kind of structure.

In 1992, Float, Incorporated was founded by Innis and three partners to develop this plan. A concrete structure using air for buoyancy became Innis’ PSP (pneumatic stabilized platform) patent. The PSP technology Innis invented uses air movement to reduce wave loads and distribute them through the platform, a platform that could be used to house offshore airports, oil and gas production facilities, floating islands, military bases, and additional real estate for coastal cities. The technology enables the platform to extract energy from ocean waves to create electricity and is less costly than most currently used large open ocean platforms.

In August 1995, the Naval Surface Warfare Center Carderock Division took an interest in the PSP's potential to serve as a floating military base and awarded Float Inc. a contract with the Defense Advanced Research Project Agency (DARPA) to test PSP. Extensive numerical modeling was performed along with two series of wave tank tests. The second series of tests at 1/48 scale was focused on air exchange. A final scientific report on the test results was submitted to the Office of Naval Research (ONR) in December 2000.
Although it has been tested and proven by the Navy, the idea has not yet found favor with short-sighted San Diego bureaucracy, although Innis and his associates at Float Inc. continue to pursue it.

The idea has recently gained more support in the scientific community, including by the man widely considered the dean of world ocean scientists, Dr. Walter Munk, who holds the Secretary of the Navy/Chief of Naval Operations Chair at the Scripps Institution of Oceanography at UC San Diego. However, current plans by San Diego officials only exist to demolish the existing airport structures and rebuild new terminals in their place in their current land-locked location.

== Personal life ==
In 1962, Innis married teacher and flower designer, Virginia Maples. The couple has three children, Christina Jean Innis, Donald Innis Jr., and Cynthia Ona Innis. Virginia Innis died in February 2007 from injuries resulting from a car accident. She is buried at El Camino Memorial Park in San Diego.

Innis still resides in San Diego and continues his passion for sailing and is a longtime member of San Diego Yacht Club. Innis also continues to work every day at Float Inc. striving to realize the dream of a floating airport and/or floating real estate.
