= Mega-Float =

Mega-Float may refer to:

- Mega-Float, an experimental 1000-meter floating runway in Tokyo Bay, existing from 2000 until 2001
- A very large pontoon-type floating structure
