= Seabasing =

Naval ability to operate at sea without land-based support

Seabasing is a naval capability to conduct selected functions and tasks at sea without reliance on infrastructure ashore. Seabasing can sustain large military forces during operations at large distances from traditional logistics centers.

== See also ==
- List of established military terms
- Expeditionary maneuver warfare
- Floating airport
- Mobile offshore base
- Sea-based X-band radar
- Seadrome
- Very large floating structure
