= SAFE Building System =

The SAFE Building System, also known as the SAFE Foundation System, is a way to build in flood zones and coastal areas, developed by architect and inventor Greg Henderson and his team at Arx Pax Labs, Inc. It is designed to float buildings, roadways, and utilities in a few feet of water. The self-adjusting floating environment draws from existing technologies used to float concrete bridges and runways such as Washington's SR 520 and Japan's Mega-Float. It also absorbs the shock of earthquakes, allowing buildings and their related communities to remain stable. Arx Pax is working with Republic of Kiribati and Pacific Rising to solve for sustainable development challenges associated with rising sea levels.

Arx Pax, the company involved in this technology has proposed building a “floating village” project in north San Jose's Alviso hamlet, deploying a group of pontoons beneath the buildings to protect the development from floods and earthquakes.

Originally developed for earthquakes as an alternative to Base Isolation the floating foundation decouples the structure from the earth with a simple patented method consisting of three parts. According to the patent, "Three part foundation systems can include a containment vessel, which constrains a buffer medium to an area above the containment vessel, and a construction platform. A building can be built on the construction platform. In a particular embodiment, during operation, the construction platform and structures built on the construction platform can float on the buffer medium. In an earthquake, a construction platform floating on a buffer medium may experience greatly reduced shear forces. In a flood, a construction platform floating on a buffer medium can be configured to rise as water levels rise to limit flood damage."

== See also ==
- Sustainable development
- Evergreen Point Floating Bridge
- Very large floating structure
