= Miami Project =

Miami Project may refer to:

- Miami Project to Cure Paralysis, an American research center devoted to research and treatment of spinal cord injuries and other causes of paralysis
- Miami Project, an annual art fair in Miami, since 2011, which has included participation by the Walter Maciel Gallery
