= Edward Robert Armstrong =

Seadrome systems designer/inventor

Edward Robert Armstrong (1876-1955) and a scale model of his seadrome

Edward Robert Armstrong (1876–1955) was a Canadian-American engineer and inventor who in 1927 proposed a series of "seadrome" floating airport platforms for airplanes to land on and refuel for transatlantic flights. While his original concept was made obsolete by long-range aircraft that did not need such refueling points, the idea of an anchored deep-sea platform was later applied to use for floating oil rigs.

== Biography ==
- Armstrong was born in 1876 in Guelph, Ontario.
- He moved to the United States and worked in Texas in the early 1900s, developing oil-well-drilling machinery.
- In 1909 he went to St. Louis, Missouri as an automotive and aviation engineer.
- In 1916 he went to DuPont to work on the construction of their nitrocellulose plant in Hopewell, Virginia. He was then promoted to chief of the plant's mechanical research department.
- In 1924 he quit DuPont to work full-time on his "seadrome" project. In 1926 he incorporated the "Armstrong Seadrome Development Company", of Wilmington, Delaware.
- He died in 1955.

== Seadrome ==
A seadrome was to be a floating steel landing strip, the size of an aircraft carrier, anchored to the ocean floor by steel cables. The runway platform would provide a 1,200 feet (370 m) runway by 200 feet (61 m) wide with extended midsides to allow for a hotel, restaurant, and other facilities. The plan was to position a series of seadromes across the Atlantic Ocean about 350 miles (560 km) apart to allow for refueling of airplanes. He had been thinking of the idea as early as 1913. In 1927 when the Lindbergh and other transatlantic flights were made, newspapers started running stories of his concept. He had financial backing until The Depression of the 1930s. The last time he made the proposal was in 1943, during World War II. By that time long-range aircraft had already been designed for the war effort, and aircraft carriers were already in use.

During the years following the depression, Armstrong made a number of rebids for the program and eventually the project was downsized from eight to five seadromes as planes had become more advanced. By WWII, the advent of long-range passenger flight made the concept obsolete.

Armstrong's efforts with DuPont and Sun Ship Building, owned by Sun Oil, led to his ideas and basic designs being used by the oil industry to create the Semi-submersible off shore oil rig.

== Publications ==
- Edward Robert Armstrong; America-Europe via North Atlantic airways over the Armstrong seadrome system of commercial ocean transit by airplane (1927)
- Edward Robert Armstrong; The seadrome project for transatlantic airways (1943)
- Leonard H. Quick; Seadrome: phase 1 report

== See also ==
- Aircraft carrier
- Lily and Clover
- Project Habakkuk
- F.P.1, 1937 film
