= Cynthia Ona Innis =

American painter

- Born: Cynthia Ona Innis; August 1969 (age 56); San Diego, California.
- Education: University of California, Berkeley; Rutgers University.
- Style: Visual Artist
- Spouse: Sascha Weiss
- Awards: James D. Phelan Award in Printmaking (2005), MacDowell Fellowship Residency (2005), Sustainable Arts Foundation Award (2023), Pollock-Krasner Foundation Grant (2025).
- Website: https://www.cynthiaonainnis.com/

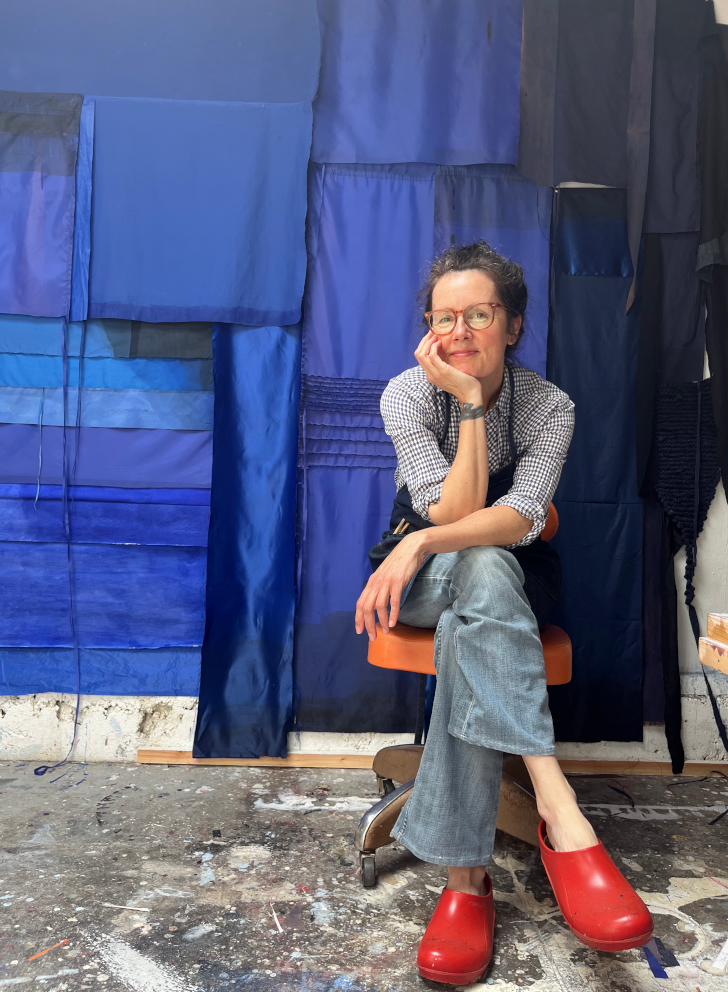
Cynthia Ona Innis in her studio, July 2025.

Cynthia Ona Innis (born 1969) is an American painter and visual artist raised in San Diego and based out of Berkeley, California. Her work has been described as "paintings one doesn't look at so much as immerse oneself in", as well as "sensual" and "organic."

== Biography ==
Innis graduated with a B.A. from the University of California at Berkeley and earned her M.F.A. from Rutgers University in New Brunswick, New Jersey. She has received the James D. Phelan Award in printmaking (2005), a MacDowell Fellowship Residency (2005), a Sustainable Arts Foundation Award (2023), and a Pollock-Krasner Foundation Grant (2025) among other awards and recognition.

Innis has been a visiting art professor and/or faculty member at the University of California at Berkeley, San Francisco Art Institute and Boise State University. Her work is represented in the collections of the Fine Arts Museums of San Francisco, San Jose Museum of Art, Berkeley Art Museum Pacific Film Archive, Crocker Art Museum, the Microsoft Art Collection and the Zimmerli Art Museum at Rutgers University. Innis is represented by the Walter Maciel Gallery in Los Angeles, California.

== Personal life ==
Innis is the daughter of architect Donald Innis and his wife Virginia, a teacher and floral designer. Her sister is film editor Chris Innis. Cynthia Ona Innis is married to Sascha Weiss, Research Chef at Perfect Day. They have a daughter and reside in the San Francisco Bay Area.
