= Dean Monogenis =

Greek-American painter and sculptor

Dean Monogenis is an American painter and sculptor. In his work he creates architectural settings using a variety of techniques which result in added lines, edges and textures. Architecture became a key theme in Monogenis' work shortly after 9/11. "Watching the World Trade Center towers come down I realized that buildings, like people, were fated to a similar cycle of life and death."

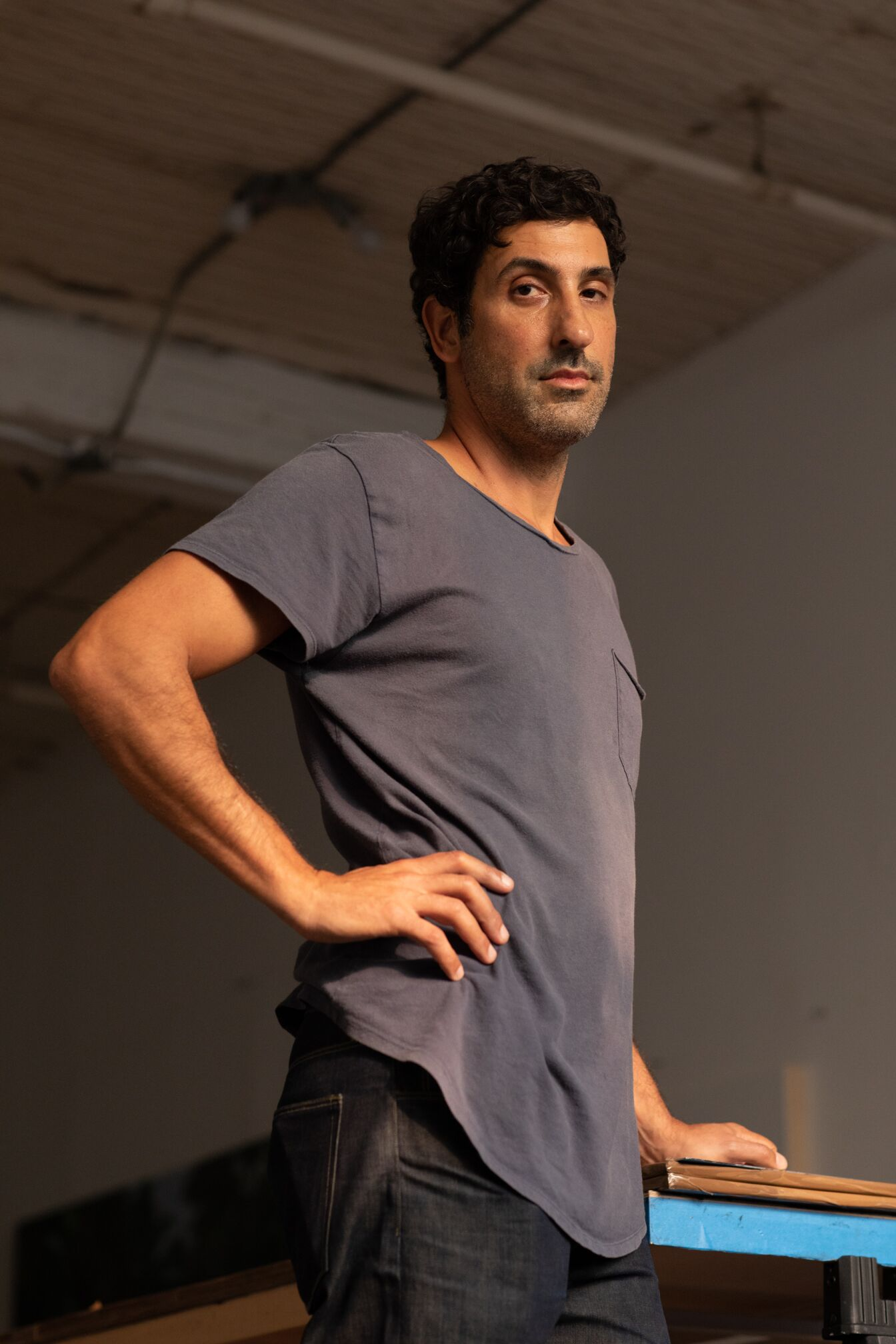
Dean Monogenis

== Education ==
Monogenis Attended Skidmore College and graduated from the School of the Art Institute of Chicago, BFA.

== Solo exhibitions ==
Monogenis has shown his work internationally at galleries including: Galerie Xippas: Paris, Geneva, Montevideo, and Athens, Baronian, Brussels; Stux Gallery, NYC; CCA Andratx, Spain; and the Walter Maciel Gallery, Los Angeles

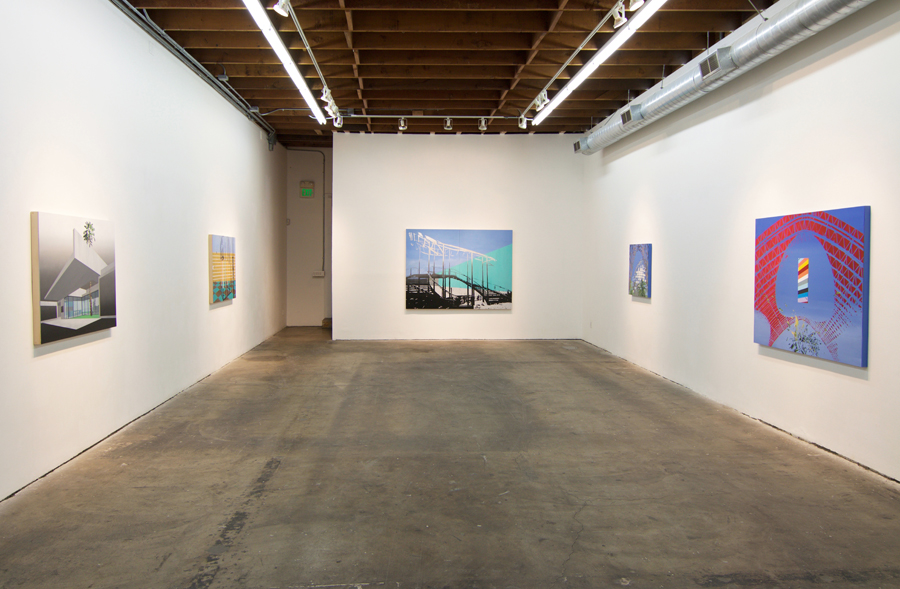
Art exhibition at Walter Maciel Gallery by Dean Monogenis

== Group exhibitions ==
His works have also been exhibited in galleries and museums including: Musée d'art moderne (Saint-Étienne), Pavillon de l'Arsenal, Neuberger Museum of Art, Santa Monica Museum of Art, CCA Andratx, Wave Hill, Federal Reserve Board of Governors, Mykonos Biennale, Angels Gate Cultural Center, Herter Art Gallery, University of Massachusetts, Bedford Gallery at the Lesher Center for the Arts, Schneider Museum of Art, Hunterdon Art Museum.

== Awards ==
Monogenis was awarded: The Artist in the Market Place (AIM) Program from the Bronx Museum of the Arts (Bronx, NY, USA)., FLOW 14 Art at Randall's Island, (Randall's Island Park, NYC, USA)., Visiting Artist Anderson Ranch,(Snowmass, Colorado, USA)

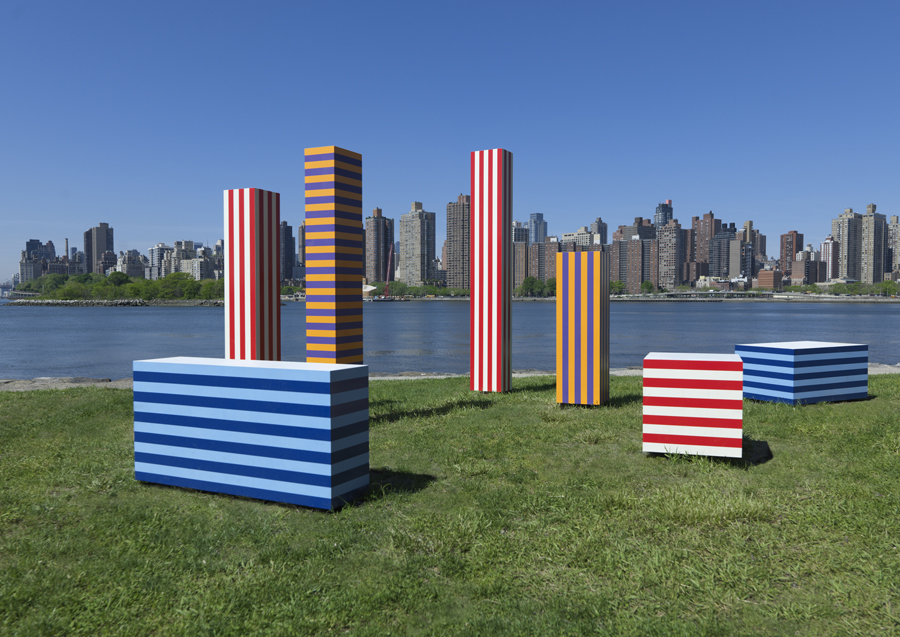
City Pillars Dean Monogenis

== Artist in residence ==
Monogenis has twice held the position Artist in Residence at Spain's CCA Andratx Art Centre (in 2012 and 2016) The Fountainhead Residency, Miami, New York's Pace University, Dyson College of Arts and Sciences.

== Collections ==
In addition to corporate collections such as Capital Group, The Progressive Art Collection and Wellington Management, Monogenis’ work is included in the public museum collection of the Federal Reserve Board, Washington DC.
