= Pneumatic stabilized platform =

A Pneumatic stabilized platform (PSP) is a technology used to float a very large floating structure (VLFS).

PSP utilizes indirect displacement, in which a platform rests on trapped air that displaces the water. The primary buoyancy force is provided by air pressure acting on the underside of the deck. The PSP is a distinct type of pneumatic platform, one in which the platform is composed of a number of cylindrical shaped components packed together in a rectangular pattern to form a module.

== Development ==
The Pneumatically Stabilized Platform was originally proposed for constructing a new floating airport for San Diego in the Pacific Ocean, at least three miles off the tip of Point Loma. However, this proposed design was rejected in October, 2003 due to high cost, the difficulty in accessing such an airport, the difficulty in transporting jet fuel, electricity, water, and gas to the structure, failure to address security concerns such as a bomb blast, inadequate room for high-speed exits and taxiways, and environmental concerns.

== See also ==
- Floating airport
