= Carolyn Castano =

American painter

Carolyn Castaño (born 1971 in Los Angeles, CA), is an American visual artist. She is the recipient of the Joan Mitchell Foundation Grant for Painters and Sculptors (2013), the California Community Foundation Getty Fellow Mid-Career Grant (2011), and the City of Los Angeles Individual Artist Grant (2011). She is an assistant professor, drawing and painting, at Long Beach City College.

Castaño creates portraits utilizing painting (watercolor and acrylic), drawing and collage. Her portrait subjects are often adorned with glittery and ornate accessories, bold hairstyles, color, and patterns referencing the world of high fashion. Some of her portraits feature a character named "Betty Ramirez," the artist's alter ego, with visual references to Mexican Golden Age cinema and Italian neorealism. Other portraits are based on photographs that are then translated into painting. For example, her series of paintings titled "Hair Boys" is based on photographs of friends donning hairstyles from past decades and even centuries.

== Education ==
- MFA, University of California, Los Angeles, 2001.
- Skowhegan, School of Painting and Sculpture, Skowhegan, Maine, 1996.
- BFA, San Francisco Art Institute, 1995.

== Exhibitions ==
- "Carolyn Castaño - A Female Topography 2001-2017." Laband Gallery, Loyola Marymount University, Los Angeles, CA. 2017.
- "El Jardin Femenil Y Otros Ocasos." Walter Maciel Gallery, Los Angeles, CA. 2012.
- "It’s Complicated." Walter Maciel Gallery, Los Angeles, CA. 2009.
- "Liquid Los Angeles: Contemporary Watercolor Art in Los Angeles." Pasadena Museum of California Art, Pasadena, CA. 2005.
- "Semi-Precious." Public Art Fund, New York, NY. 2004.
- "Against Nature." Lombard-Freid Fine Arts, New York, NY. 2004.
- "International Paper: Drawings by Emerging Artists." Hammer Museum, University of California, Los Angeles, CA. 2003.
- "Marked: Bay Area "Drawings." Bertha and Karl Leubsdorf Art Gallery, Hunter College, City University of New York, NY. 2001.
- "Sin Titulo: Fragrant Afternoon." Meridian Gallery, San Francisco, CA. 2000.
- "The Adventures of Betty Ramirez and Little Miss Attitude." Movimiento de Arte y Cultura Latino Americana (MACLA)/San Jose Museum of Art, San Jose, CA. 1999.
