= Unsinkable aircraft carrier =

Landmass used as part of a navy

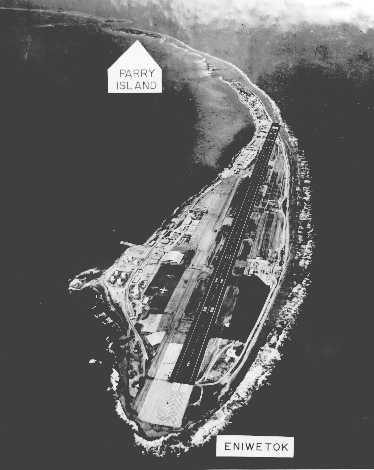
Aerial view of the American airstrip on Enewetak Atoll, an archetypical "unsinkable aircraft carrier".

An unsinkable aircraft carrier is a geographically or politically important island that is used to extend the power projection of a military force. Because such an entity is capable of acting as an air base and a physical landmass is not easily destroyed, it is, in effect, an immobile aircraft carrier that cannot be sunk.

The term unsinkable aircraft carrier first appeared during World War II to describe the islands and atolls in the Pacific Ocean that became strategically important as potential airstrips for American bombers in their transoceanic war against Japan. To this end, the U.S. military engaged in numerous island-hopping operations to oust the occupying Japanese forces from such islands; the U.S. Navy Seabees would often have to subsequently construct airstrips there quickly from scratch, sometimes over entire atolls, in order to support air operations against Japan.

Midway Atoll has been described as a fourth, unsinkable, American aircraft carrier at the Battle of Midway in 1942, in addition to the three conventional American carriers that were present. It functioned this way in the battle, with aircraft from the atoll attacking Japanese carriers and the atoll being attacked in turn.

Malta and Iceland were sometimes described as unsinkable aircraft carriers during World War II, making Malta a target of the Axis powers.

During the Korean War (1950–1953) United States General Douglas MacArthur described Taiwan as an unsinkable aircraft carrier. People's Republic of China normalized relations in the 1970s and the United States annulled the Sino-American Mutual Defense Treaty with Taiwan. However, the United States has de facto maintained the status quo through the Taiwan Relations Act.

The U.S. military is also said to have considered the British Isles as unsinkable aircraft carriers during the Cold War. In 1983, Japanese Prime Minister Yasuhiro Nakasone pledged to make Japan an "unsinkable aircraft carrier in the Pacific", assisting the U.S. in defending against the threat of Soviet bombers. The metaphor has also been applied to Israel: in a 1980 article reprinted in the Congressional Record, Stephen Bryen, then executive director of the Jewish Institute for National Security Affairs, wrote that Israel "can be a substitute aircraft carrier—one that cannot be sunk". In arguing against production of the CVA-01 aircraft carriers, the Royal Air Force claimed that Australia could serve adequately in the same role, using false maps that placed Singapore 400 miles (640 km) closer to Australia. The island of Cyprus is also often described as an unsinkable aircraft carrier, in relation to the military presence of the United Kingdom there.

During World War II, the United Kingdom gave some serious thought to building virtually unsinkable aircraft carriers from ice reinforced with sawdust (Project Habakkuk). A model was made, and serious consideration was given to the project, with a design displacing 2.2 million tons and accommodating 150 twin-engine bombers on the drawing board, but it was never produced.

== See also ==
- Diego Garcia
- Military on Gotland
- Mobile offshore base
- Stone frigate
- Strategic geography
- Tinian in World War II
- Territorial disputes in the South China Sea
