= Lezley Saar =

African American artist (born 1953)

- Born: Lezley Irene Saar; April 13, 1953 (age 73); Los Angeles, California, U.S.
- Education: California State University at Nothridge
- Children: 1

Lezley Irene Saar is an African American artist whose artwork is responsive to race, gender, female identity, and her ancestral history. Her works are primarily mixed media, 3-dimensional, and oil & acrylic on paper and canvas. Through her artistic practice Lezley explores western and non-western concepts of beauty, feminist psychology and spirituality. Many works conjure elements of magical realism. She has exhibited widely in the U.S. and internationally. Her work is included in museum collections such as The Kemper Museum, CAAM, The Ackland Art Museum, the Smith College Museum of Art, the Studio Museum in Harlem and MOCA. She is currently represented by Walter Maciel Gallery in Los Angeles and Various Small Fires in Asia.

== Early life ==
Lezley Irene Saar was born into a family of artists in Los Angeles. Her mother Betye Saar (née Brown) was an African-American assemblage artist and her father Richard Saar was a ceramist and art conservator. She grew up surrounded by art; her mother's first studio was the family kitchen table. She has two sisters, visual artist Alison Saar and writer Tracye Saar. Lezley and Alison occasionally collaborate when they find their current interests collide.

In 1972 Saar enrolled at the L'Institut Francais de Photographie in Paris, which influenced her use of portrait imagery. She continued her studies in 1976 at San Francisco State University, and supported her artistic practice by working at KPFA radio in Berkeley, and creating illustrations for Bay area writers such as Ishmael Reed. She received her B.A. from California State University at Northridge in 1978.

== Artistic career ==
Drawing on her experience working for Ishmael Reed and exposure to Bar area literary scene Saar's constructed altered books in 1989, which she created while pregnant with her first child in 1989. She exhibited at the Jan Baum Gallery in Los Angeles and the David Beitzel Gallery in New York the 1990s.

Employing found objects, oil, acrylic, fabric, photographs, Saar’s work is a comment on themes of "hybridity, acceptance, and belonging." Many works are narratives of African American literature and historical figures. She stated, "I like the idea of a painting sucking you in like when you really get sucked in by a good book…I use that kind of metaphor as a vehicle for doing my art."

Lezley's work is both inspired by and a reaction to growing up in a family of artists. Working alongside her mother, sister, and daughter has been described as an important professional experience that contributed to her interest in feminism, African American history, and biracial identity.

Her 2020 exhibition "A contouring of Conjourors" was an installation of works exploring the complexity of identity. Works are named, not titled. She stated the exhibition "resembles a series of seven shrines — sacred places where visitors may commune with spirits from the past, present and future."

Saar is the recipient of the California State Senate Contemporary Art Collection award (2000), the J. Paul Getty Mid-Career Grant (1996), and the Seagram’s Gin Perspective in African American Art Fellowship (1995).

== Exhibitions ==
- 1990 "Altered Books," Art Works, Los Angeles, CA
- 1991 "Altar(ed) Books," Koplin Gallery, Santa Monica, CA
- 1993 "The Athenaeum," Koplin Gallery, Santa Monica, CA
- 1994 "The Athenaeum II," Mesa College, San Diego, CA
- 1994 "Recent Work", Jan Baum Gallery, Los Angeles, CA
- 1999 Anomalies", Fresno Museum of Art, Fresno, CA
- 1997 New Work, David Beitzel Gallery, New York, NY
- 1996 Repetitive Ritual", Jan Baum Gallery, Los Angeles, CA
- 2000 "Works by Alison and Leslie Saar", Williamson Gallery, Scripps College, Claremont, CA
- 2000 "Africans, Tragic Mulattos, Anomalies and Rap" David Beitzel Gallery, NY
- 2000 "Africans, Rap Thugs-n-Dimes", The Contemporary Arts Center, Cincinnati, OH, traveled to the Saint Louis Museum, St. Louis, MO
- 2000 "Paradox of the Unexpected Hanging", Jan Baum Gallery, Los Angeles, CA
- 2003 "Anomalies", Kemper Museum of Contemporary Art, Kansas City, MO
- 2003 "Encyclopedia Exotica", David Beitzel Gallery, New York, NY
- 2003 "Africans, Rap Thugs-n-Dimes", Forum for Contemporary Art, St. Louis, MO
- 2003 "Mulatto Nation", List Gallery, Swarthmore College, PA
- 2018 Betye, Alison, and Lezley Saar", MOAH, Lancaster, CA
- 2017 "Salon des Refusés", California African American Museum, Los Angeles, CA
- 2017 "Gender Renaissance", Walter Maciel Gallery, Los Angeles, CA
- 2014 "Monad", Merry Karnowsky Gallery, Los Angeles, CA
- 2012 "Madwoman in the Attic", Merry Karnowsky Gallery, Los Angeles, CA
- 2010. "Autist’s Fables", Merry Karnowsky Gallery, Los Angeles, CA
- 2007 "Tooth Hut", Walter Maciel Gallery, Los Angeles, CA
- 2007 "Family Legacies: The Art of Betye, Lezley & Alison Saar", Palmer Art Museum, University Park, PA
- 2007 "Family Legacies", Pasadena Museum of California Art, Pasadena, CA and San Jose Museum of Art, San Jose, CA
- 2005 "Family Legacies", Ackland Art Museum, Chapel Hill, NC
- 2004 "Recent Work," Kravets/Wehby Gallery, New York, NY
- 2004 "The Secret Self", Sawhill Gallery, James Madison University, Harrisonburg, VA
- 2003 Mulatto Nation", Jan Baum Gallery, Los Angeles, CA
- 2020 "A Conjuring of Conjurers", Walter Maciel Gallery, Culver City, CA

== Publications ==
- Saar, Lezley. Yolanda and the Strange Objects. I Reed Books, 1978, ISBN 978-0918408105
- Taha, Halima. Collecting African American Art. Crown Publishers, 1998, ISBN 978-0517705933
- Dallow, Jessica. Family Legacies: The Art of Betye, Lezley, and Alison Saar. Chapel Hill: Ackland Art Museum, the University of North Carolina at Chapel Hill in association with University of Washington Press, 2005, ISBN 029598564X
- Saar, Lezley. Autist's Fables. 2010.
- Von Blum, Paul. Creative Souls: African American Artists in Greater Los Angeles. New World African Press, 2018, ISBN 9781945172052
- Brown, Betty Ann. Memory and Identity: The Marvelous Art of Betye Lezley and Alison Saar. Griffith Moon Press, 2018, ISBN 9780999845219
