= Mobile offshore base =

Naval self-propelled moving platform

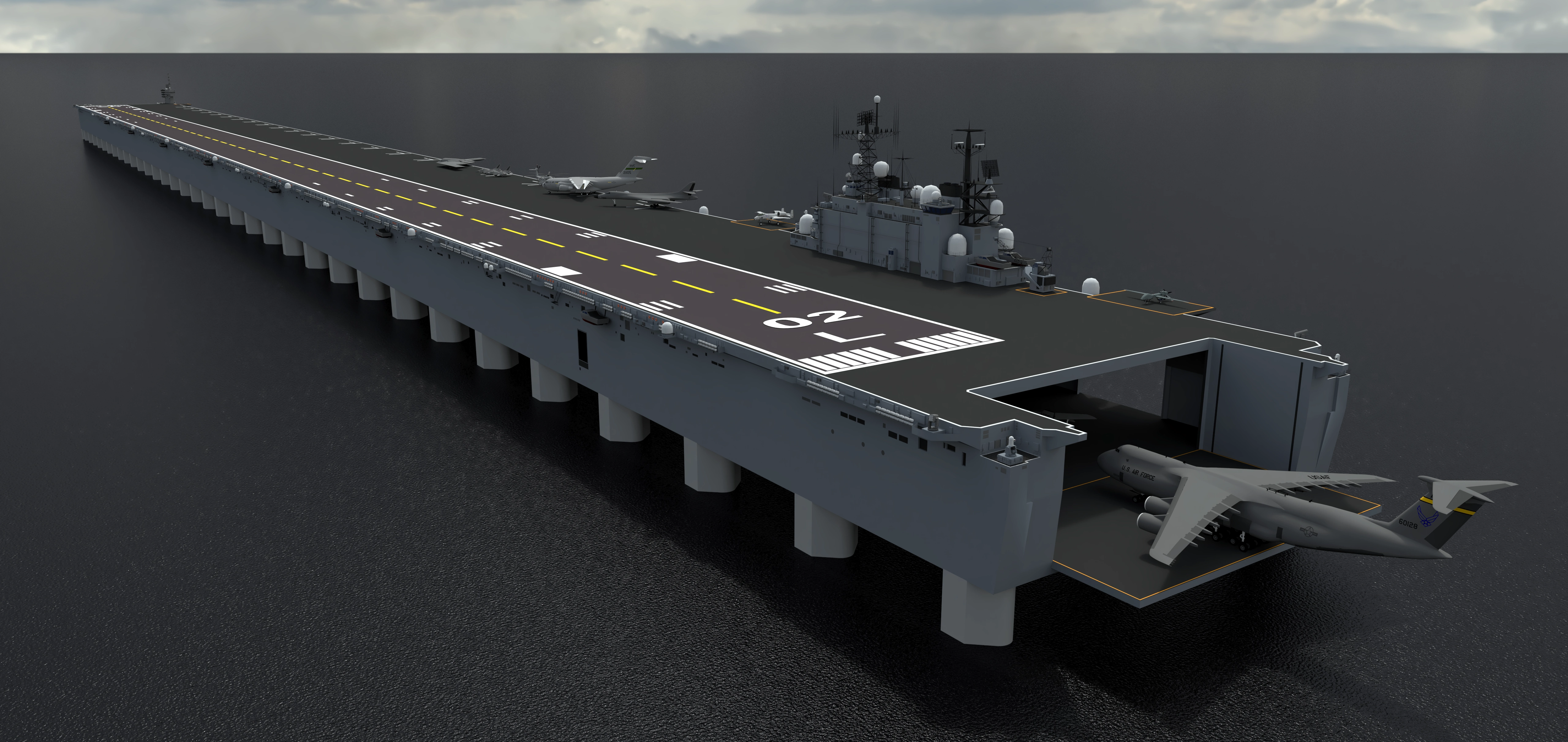
Mobile offshore base rendering

Mobile offshore base (MOB), sometimes called a joint mobile offshore base (JMOB), is a concept for supporting military operations beyond the home shores, where conventional land bases are not available, by deploying on the high seas or in coastal waters, in-theater multipurpose floating base assembled from individual platforms. In essence, a MOB is a multipurpose modular self-propelled floating platform, or several interconnected platforms, that can perform multiple functions of a sea base including strike, deployment and logistics. An ocean-wise semi-submersible wave and wind resistant platform capable of moving at one-half the speed of conventional prepositioning monohull cargo ship has been researched and proposed, but never built.

== Concept ==
The Mobile offshore base concept emerged during a search for a more cost effective option of sustaining in-theater strike, flight, maintenance, supply and other forward logistics support needs compared with utilizing traditional joint logistics approaches including nuclear-powered aircraft carriers and large medium speed roll-on/roll-off (LMSR) sealift ships. MOB modules were projected as semi-submersible units having significantly smaller wave-induced motions compared to conventional hulls.

The MOB would be constructed out of a series of semi-submersible modules (traditionally envisioned as between 300 and 500 metres long and between 120 and 170 metres wide) that could join to form a full-length runway. Each module would, via support columns, be atop two pontoons which would contain ballasts. When travelling, the module would sail along the surface of the water via its pontoons. When stationary, the ballasts are filled and the pontoons are submerged, leaving the platform still above the waterline. This helps keep the module stable.

In theory, the modularity of a MOB allows the full spectrum of air support, ranging from vertical/short takeoff and landing (VSTOL) aircraft using a single platform to conventional takeoff and landing (CTOL) aircraft utilizing several serially aligned modules approaching 2 km (6,000 feet) in length. The cluster could have an air strip that could hold a large aircraft such as C-130 or C-17. In addition, a MOB accepts ship-borne cargo, provides nominally 280,000 m^{2} (3 million square feet) for equipment storage and maintenance, stores 40 million litres (10 million gallons) of fuel, houses up to 3,000 troops (an Army heavy brigade), and discharges resources to the shore via a variety of landing craft. It was argued, that once positioned, the MOB would operate as a sea base for an extended period, so it would need to have port-like facilities for unloading and loading conventional container and roll-on/roll-off ships.

== History ==
The idea of the MOB was first seriously considered when the United States entered Operation Desert Shield (1990–91). The U.S. was forced to request the use of allied bases, which, besides strictly military considerations, proved to be politically sensitive in the case of Saudi Arabia. With the MOB concept the U.S. could have a base anywhere in the world in as little as a month. The base as conceived would have had virtually unlimited capabilities, and most of its creators did not envision just a floating air strip, but a town-sized base.

The joint mobile offshore base (JMOB) was a MOB concept for expeditionary warfare and humanitarian and commercial operations developed in the 1990s by McDermott International, Inc. of Arlington, Virginia. The JMOB was to be composed of five self-propelled units creating a one-mile long runway that could accommodate a fully loaded C-17. NATO was thought to be interested in the concept at the time.

A technical report presented to the U.S. Congress in April 2000 identified that such a base was technologically feasible and could be built by the defense industry of the United States. It was estimated that each 300m long module would cost around $1.5 billion and a full, 2 km long MOB would cost between $5–8 billion. However, a 2001 feasibility study for the United States Department of Defense concluded that a MOB would have lower cost effectiveness compared to alternatives such as aircraft carriers and LMSR cargo ships.

Smaller versions of the MOB have also been proposed - in 2017, the Malaysian Marine Technology Company proposed a Mobile Offshore Base Station, a 62m long self-propelled barge. It would be fully air-conditioned and feature a galley, a mess room, meeting room, prayer room, recreation room and control room. It can accommodate 40 sailors for one month at sea. It possessed a rear-mounted slipway to recover small boats (such as the Swedish CB-90) and a large, front-mounted helicopter pad. A smaller, 44.8m long "8-point mooring barge) variant was also proposed. In 2019, another Malaysian company, Muhibbah Engineering, proposed its own design, which had four legs, each 135m long, which it could deploy to raise it above the sea surface and swell. It could normally accommodate 150 military personnel and up to 420 people during disaster relief operations.

== Criticism ==
In December 1999, the Office of Naval Research (ONR) in response to a congressional mandate issued a report which delineated the impracticality of MOBs, "the largest floating offshore structure ever conceived by maritime engineers", on the grounds of high cost and vulnerability to threats such as missile attack. In January 2001, the Institute for Defense Analyses (IDA) stated that MOB "would not be capable of effectively replacing conventional sealift" because it provides an inferior delivery capability to the existing Joint Logistics Over-the-Shore (JLOTS) system. The report concluded that the estimated US$5 billion to US$8 billion MOB project was less cost effective than other solutions existing at the time.

== See also ==
- Expeditionary Transfer Dock
- Military logistics
- Military power projection
- Seabasing
- Unsinkable aircraft carrier
- Very large floating structure
- Floating airport
- Supercarrier
- Project Habakkuk
- Sea-based X-band Radar
