= Walter Maciel Gallery =

Art gallery in Los Angeles, California, United States

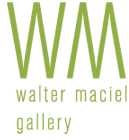

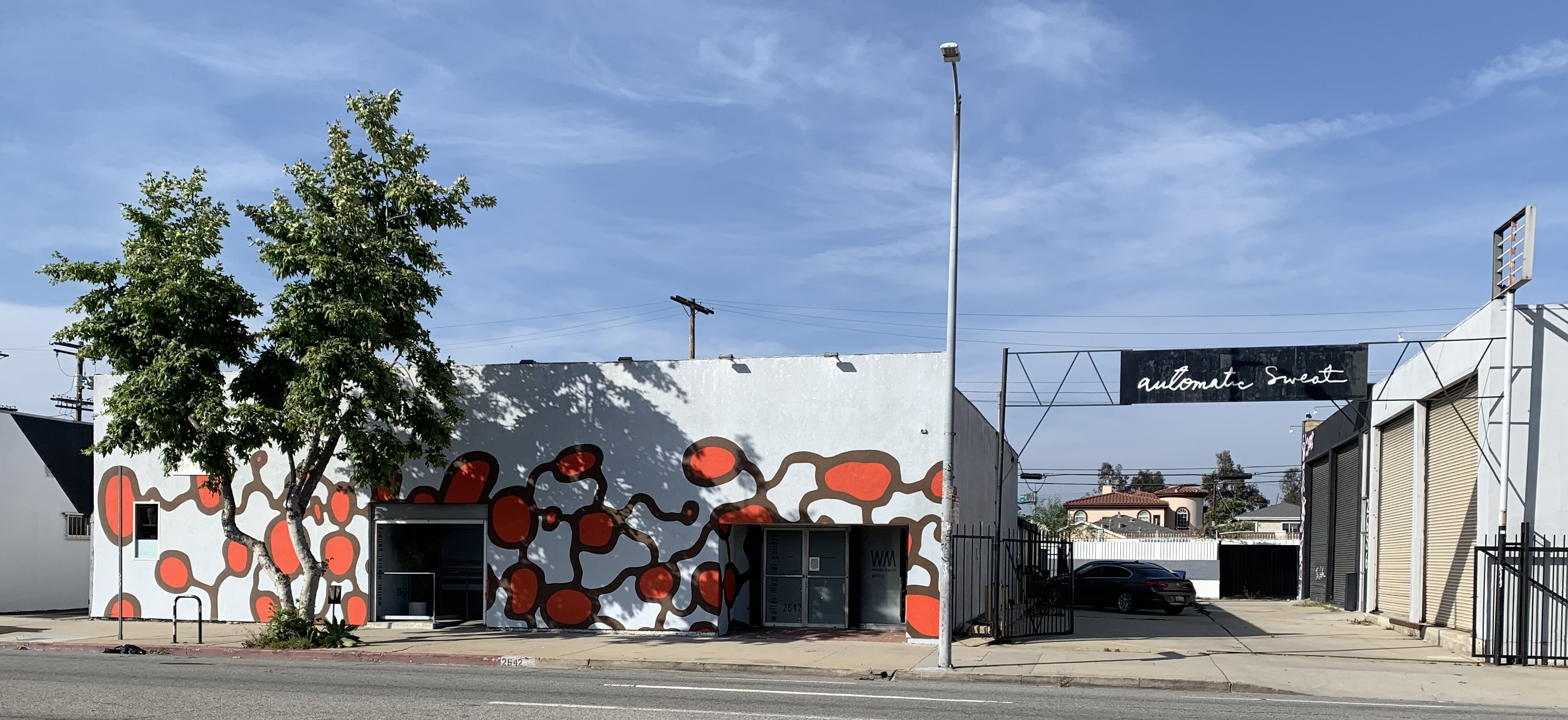
- Interactive map of Walter Maciel Gallery
- Address: 2642 S. La Cienega Boulevard
- Location: Los Angeles, CA 90034
- Coordinates: 34.03431°N 118.37689°W
- Type: Art gallery

Construction
- Opened: 2005

Walter Maciel Gallery is an art gallery founded in 2005, located at 2642 S. La Cienega Boulevard, in the Culver City Arts District in Los Angeles, California, United States. Walter Maciel worked as a gallery director in San Francisco for fourteen years before he moved to Southern California and opened his own space. Maciel has served on many boards and committees, including Southern Exposure, Headlands Center for the Arts, Hospitality House in San Francisco, and the San Francisco Art Dealers Association. He has been on lecture panels at UCLA, the San Francisco Art Institute, California College of the Arts, UC Berkeley, Pacific Northwest College of Art, University of Missouri, Kansas City, Ulrich Museum of Art, Wichita State University, Wichita, KS and the Institute of Contemporary Art, San Jose.

Walter Maciel Gallery shows emerging and established contemporary artists in mediums ranging from painting and sculpture to conceptual photography and video. The gallery represents the work of Chinese born Hung Liu; Los Angeles artists Lezley Saar, Maria E. Piñeres, Rachael Neubauer, Carolyn Castaño, Nike Schroeder, Dana Weiser and Brendan Lott; Bay Area artists Cynthia Ona Innis, John Bankston, Katherine Sherwood, Robb Putnam and Lisa Solomon; New York artists Dean Monogenis, Pepa Prieto, John Jurayj, Jil Weinstock and Brendan Lott, among other prominent artists such as Barry Anderson, Freddy Chandra and Colin Doherty. The gallery participates in international art fairs, including The Armory Show, Aqua Art Miami, Art on Paper NY, ArtPad San Francisco, artMRKT San Francisco, Edition Chicago, Miami Project, NADA Miami Beach, Next Chicago, Pulse London, Pulse Miami, Pulse Miami Beach, Pulse New York, Swab Barcelona, Untitled Miami Beach and Volta New York.

Artists represented include:

- Barry Anderson
- John Bankston
- Carolyn Castaño
- Freddy Chandra
- Colin Doherty
- Cynthia Ona Innis
- John Jurayj
- Andy Kolar
- Hung Liu
- Brendan Lott
- Dean Monogenis
- Timothy Paul Myers
- Rachael Neubauer
- Maria E. Piñeres
- Pepa Prieto
- Robb Putnam
- Lezley Saar
- Nike Schröder
- Katherine Sherwood
- Lisa Solomon
- Jil Weinstock
- Dana Weiser
