= Lily and Clover =

WWII British floating airfields

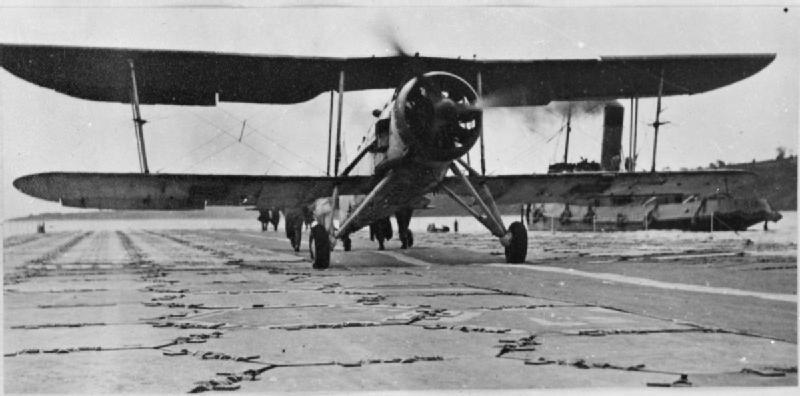
Fairey Swordfish on Lily runway

Lily and Clover were two experimental floating airfields tested towards the end of the Second World War by the British Admiralty.

Based on a similar concept to the Mulberry harbour used for the Normandy landings in 1944, Lily and Clover were two different types of floating airstrips that would allow the Royal Navy to operate aircraft before a shore base is secured and removed the need for an aircraft carrier.

Lily was a collection of flotation units developed for the floating roadways used in the Mulberry harbour. Each was six feet across, plates being fitted on the top to form the runway. The complete structure could be towed and weighed 5,000 tons, taking 400 man-hours to construct. Clover was built mainly of wood with wooden deck planking which could take a load of eight tons. It weighed more than Lily at 5,200 tons but would take 21,000 man-hours to assemble. The resulting runway was 1,000 feet (305 m) long and 90 feet (27 m) wide with 12,500 square feet (1,160 m^{2}) of parking area and 45,000 square feet (4,200 m^{2}) for storage and maintenance.

Trials were carried in the Firth of Clyde at Lamlash on the Isle of Arran. Both an Auster and Fairey Swordfish aircraft were used for the trials. The trial was a success and proved that both Lily and Clover could take aircraft up to 9,000 lb (4,100 kg) with a 60-knot (110 km/h) landing speed in calm seas. Lily was tested successfully with 30 ft (9 m) waves but became dangerous at 40-foot (12 m).

Lily was maintained for nine-months with little deterioration, but Clover did not stand up as well. Lily was designed to be assembled from a merchant ship and it was clear that the structure could not be sunk by bombing, with damaged sections replaced as required. Landing technique was similar to an aircraft carrier, once the undulation was taken into account, with an arrestor gear fitted similar to that used on Light Fleet Carriers.

The floating airstrips were seen as a back-up for escort carriers and would have operated 48 Supermarine Spitfires. The concept was intended to be used for Operation Downfall, the planned invasion of Japan, but the war in the Far-East ended before they were used operationally.

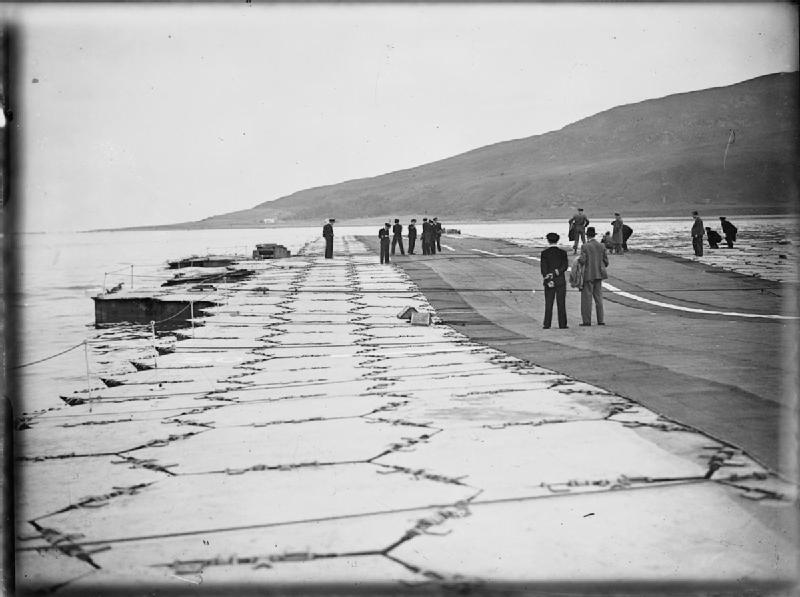
View from Lily

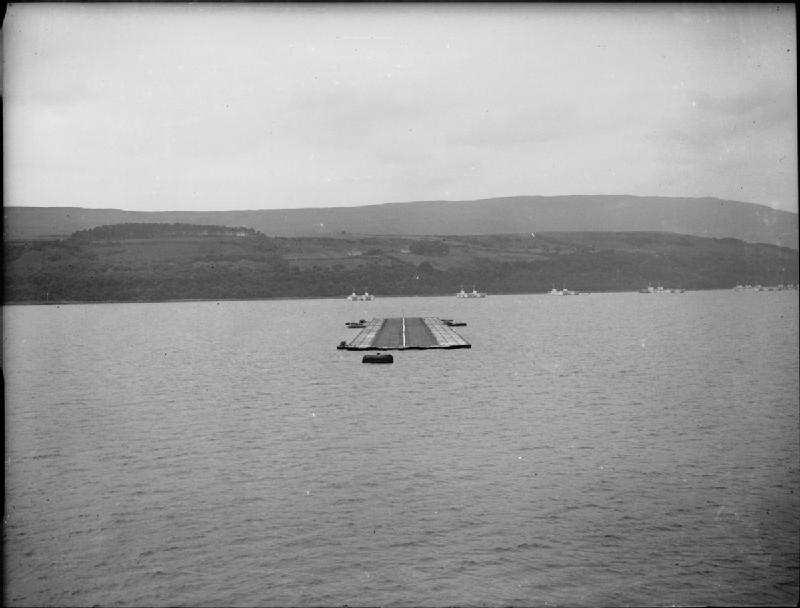
Lily from the air

== See also ==
- Aircraft carrier
- Project Habakkuk
