= Floating airport =

Infrastructure concept

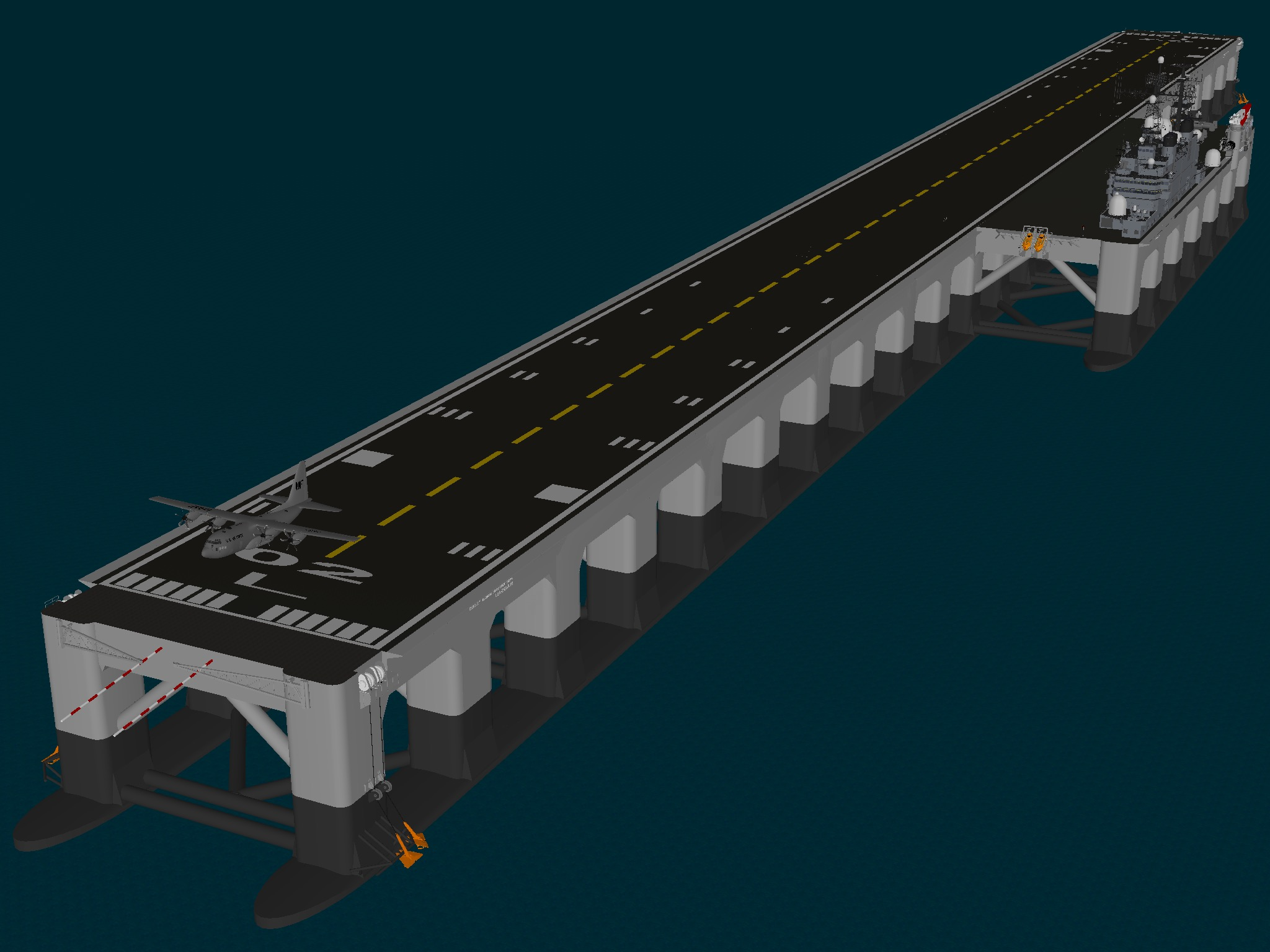
Mobile offshore base mobile mode

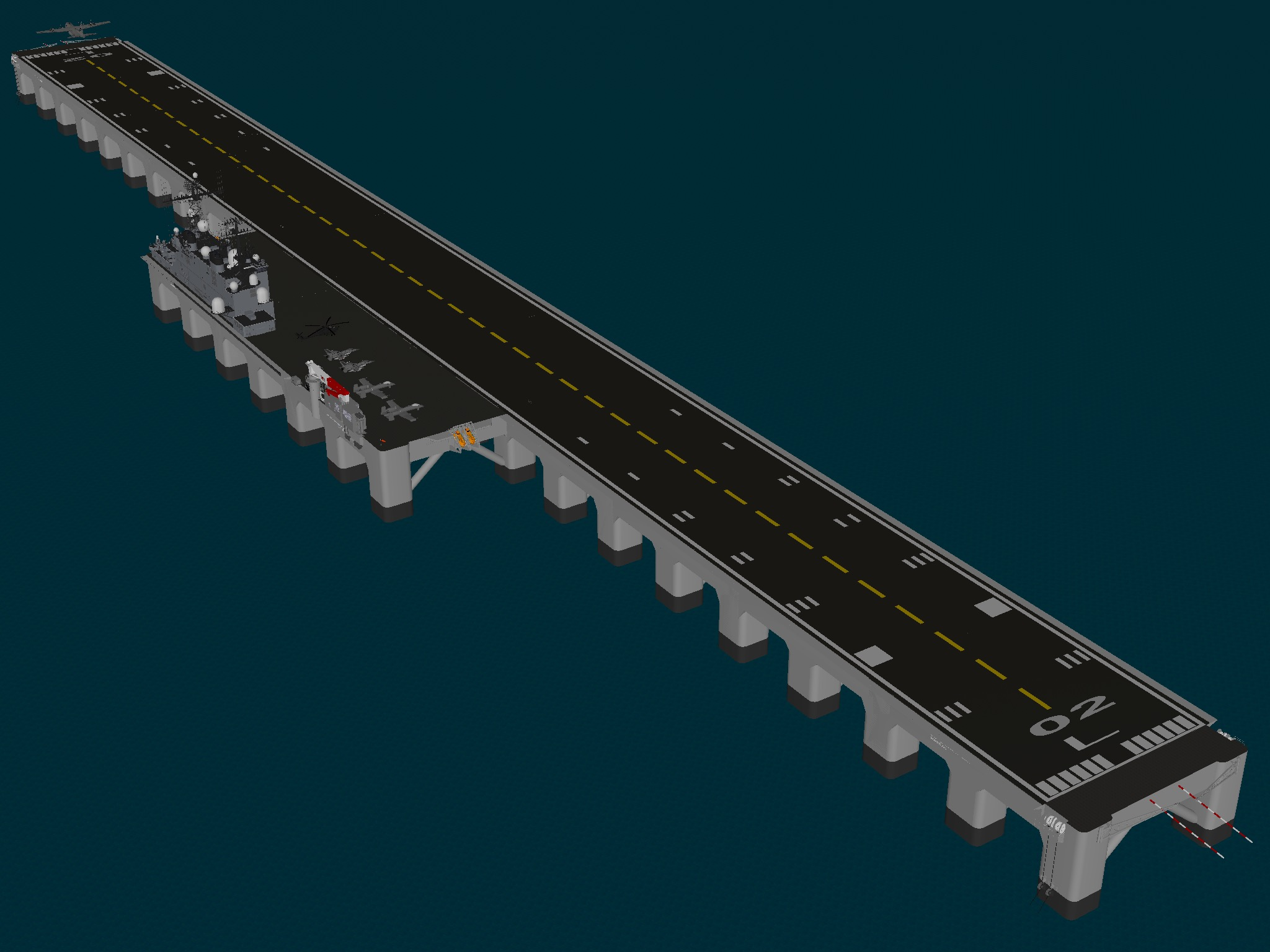
Mobile offshore base stationary mode

A floating airport is an airport built and situated on a very large floating structure (VLFS) located many miles out at sea utilizing a flotation type of device or devices such as pneumatic stabilized platform (PSP) technology.

As the population increases and land becomes more expensive and scarce, very large floating structures (VLFS) such as floating airports could help solve land use, pollution and aircraft noise issues.

== Early history ==
The first discussion of a floating airport was for trans-Atlantic flights. At that time a passenger aircraft capable of making the trip could be built, but because of the massive need for fuel for the flight, it had a limited payload. An article appeared in the January 1930 issue of Popular Mechanics in which a model of a floating airport located in the Atlantic was proposed. To make safe flight possible with the aviation technology of that time, it called for eight such airports in the Atlantic. But unlike future floating airport ideas which were free floating, this 1930 concept had a floating airport platform, but with stabilizer legs which prevent the flight deck from pitching and rolling, similar in concept to some of today's off shore oil rigs. The cost of establishing eight such floating airports in 1930 was estimated at approximately USD$12,000,000 equivalent to $178,831,000 in 2024. The idea of floating airports received fresh attention in 1935 when the famous French aviation pilot and builder Bleriot gave one of his last interviews in which he made the case for installing some mid-Atlantic; he called them Seadromes as a solution to economical trans-Atlantic passenger flights.

In 1943, a Floating Pontoon Flight Deck, 272 feet wide and 1,810 feet long was constructed by the Seabees at Allen Harbor using a total of 10,291 pontoons. It was towed to a cove in Narragansett Bay, where 140 takeoffs, landings and refuellings were successful in both smooth and rough waters. The pontoon airfield was noted to have advantages over aircraft carriers in lack of requirement for arresting gear for landings, and these could be executed at shorter time intervals. Tests showed that damage from four 100-pound bombs exploding on the floating deck did not interfere with flight operations and could be easily repaired.

== Description ==
In theory, issues and problems of land-based airports could be minimized by locating airports several miles off the coast. Takeoffs and landings would be over water, not over populated areas, thereby eliminating noise pollution and reducing risks of aircraft crashes to the land-locked population.

Since little of the ocean's surface is currently being used for human activity, growth and alterations in configuration would be relatively easy to achieve with minimal impact to the environment or to local residents who would utilize the airport. Water taxis or other high speed surface vessels would be a part of an offshore mass transit system that could connect the floating airport to coastal communities and minimize traffic issues.

A floating structure, such as a floating airport, is theorized to have less impact on the environment than the land-based alternative. It would not require much, if any, dredging or moving of mountains or clearing of green space and the floating structure provides a reef-like environment conducive to marine life. In theory, wave energy could be harnessed, using the structure to convert waves into energy to help sustain the energy needs of the airport.

== Modern Floating airport projects ==
In 2000, the Japanese Ministry of Land, Infrastructure, and Transport sponsored the construction of Mega-Float, a 1000-metre floating runway in Tokyo Bay. After conducting several real aircraft landings, the Ministry concluded that floating runways' hydro-elastic response would not affect aircraft operations, including precision instrument approaches in a protected waterway such as a large bay. The structure has been dismantled and is no longer in use.

The pneumatic stabilized platform (PSP) was proposed as a means for constructing a new floating airport for San Diego in the Pacific Ocean, at least three miles off the tip of Point Loma. However, this proposed design was rejected in October 2003 due to very high cost, the difficulty in accessing such an airport, the difficulty in transporting jet fuel, electricity, water, and gas to the structure, failure to address security concerns such as a bomb blast, inadequate room for high-speed exits and taxiways, and environmental concerns.

Achmad Yani International Airport, the first floating airport in the world started construction on 17 June 2014, and was completed in 2018. However, only the passenger terminal and apron are floating.

== See also ==
- Index of aviation articles
- Lily and Clover
- Aerospace architecture
- Mobile offshore base
- Seabasing
- F.P.1 German film 1932
