= List of shipwrecks in August 1873 =

The list of shipwrecks in August 1873 includes ships sunk, foundered, grounded, or otherwise lost during August 1873.

== 1 August ==
List of shipwrecks: 1 August 1873
| Ship | State | Description |
|---|---|---|
| Charles Louisa | France | The ship barque was driven ashore and wrecked at the Pointe de La Coubre, Charente-Inférieure. She was on a voyage from La Guaira, Venezuela to Royan, Charente-Inférieure. |
| Express | United Kingdom | The schooner was run into by the brig Alert (United Kingdom) at Maryport, Cumberland and was severely damaged. |
| Marius, and Wild Hunter | France; United Kingdom | The brigantine Marius collided with the brigantine Wild Hunter in the Atlantic Ocean off the coast of Portugal. Both vessels sank. Their crews survived. Marius was on a voyage from Marseille, Bouches-du-Rhône to Rouen, Seine-Inférieure. Wild Hunter was on a voyage from Lisbon, Portugal to Halifax, Nova Scotia, Canada. |
| Wawasset | United States | The steamboat was destroyed by fire in the Potomac River 60 nautical miles (110 km) downstream of Washington, D.C. with the loss of more than 40 of the 129 people on board. |

== 2 August ==
List of shipwrecks: 2 August 1873
| Ship | State | Description |
|---|---|---|
| St. Clair of the Isles | United Kingdom | The steamship struck a sunken rock and was beached on the Ardnamurchan peninsula. She was later refloated and beached at Tobermory, Isle of Mull for temporary repairs to be made before taking her in to the Clyde on 14 August. |
| Warrior | United Kingdom | The yacht exploded and sank in the River Tay with the loss of three of the five people on board. |
| Waveney | United Kingdom | The brig ran aground on the Longsand, in the North Sea off the coast of Essex. She was on a voyage from Lowestoft, Suffolk to Calais, France. She was refloated with the assistance of five smacks and assisted in to Harwich, Essex. |

== 3 August ==
List of shipwrecks: 3 August 1873
| Ship | State | Description |
|---|---|---|
| Benachie | United Kingdom | The steamship sprang a leak and foundered off Tarifa, Spain. Her 21 crew reached Tarifa in their boats. She was on a voyage from Newcastle upon Tyne, Northumberland to Livorno, Italy. |
| St. Louis | (Canada) | The ship was wrecked in Trepassey Bay. She was on a voyage from Liverpool, Lancashire, United Kingdom to Philadelphia, Pennsylvania. |

== 4 August ==
List of shipwrecks: 4 August 1873
| Ship | State | Description |
|---|---|---|
| Bonaventure | United Kingdom | The ship departed from Liverpool, Lancashire for Havana, Cuba. No further trace, presumed foundered with the loss of all hands. |
| Emily | United Kingdom | The schooner was run into by the steamship Allemania (Germany) and sank off Portland, Dorset with the loss of six of the ten people on board. Survivors were rescued by Allemania. Emily was on a voyage from the River Tyne to Genoa, Italy. |
| Janrovich | Ottoman Empire | The brig was beached in Tangier Bay. |
| Snowdrop | United Kingdom | The fishing smack was driven ashore at Aberdovey, Cardiganshire. Her crew were rescued by the Aberdovey Lifeboat Royal Berkshire ( Royal National Lifeboat Institution). Snowdrop was later refloated. |

== 5 August ==
List of shipwrecks: 5 August 1873
| Ship | State | Description |
|---|---|---|
| Azalea | United Kingdom | The steamship ran aground on an uncharted rock 387 yards (354 m) east of Perim, Aden Province. Her crew survived. She was abandoned as a total loss in late September. |
| Miantomia | United Kingdom | The ship collided with the barque Flufine (France) south of Algoa Bay and sank with the loss of all but three of her crew. Survivors were rescued by Flufine. |

== 6 August ==
List of shipwrecks: 6 August 1873
| Ship | State | Description |
|---|---|---|
| Daring | United Kingdom | The yacht was wrecked on the Jordan Flat, in Liverpool Bay with the loss of two of her three crew. The survivor was rescued by a gig. She was on a voyage from Beaumaris, Anglesey to Liverpool, Lancashire. |
| Oscar | United States | The ship was destroyed by fire at New York. |
| Toni | Flag unknown | The ship was severely damaged by fire at New York. |
| Unnamed | United Kingdom | The fishing boat struck a rock and sank at Wick, Caithness with the loss of four of her crew. |
| William Bailies | United States | The schooner, a ballast Lighter, was lost at Cape Ledge, near Milk Island. Crew saved. |

== 7 August ==
List of shipwrecks: 7 August 1873
| Ship | State | Description |
|---|---|---|
| Clara and Florence | (United Kingdom of Great Britain and Ireland) Cape Colony | The brig was wrecked at Hottentot's Point, Africa. Her crew took to the boats; they were subsequently rescued by Lilla (United Kingdom). Clara and Florence was on a toyage from Table Bay to Ichaboe Island, Africa. |
| Eliza, or Elizabeth | United Kingdom | The brig was driven ashore and wrecked at Waterford. Her crew were rescued. She was refloated with assistance from the steamship Jessy (United Kingdom) and beached at Duncannon, County Waterford. |

== 8 August ==
List of shipwrecks: 8 August 1873
| Ship | State | Description |
|---|---|---|
| Emmanuel | France | The brig ran aground on the Goodwin Sands, Kent, United Kingdom. |
| Gowerain | United Kingdom | The schooner ran aground on the Pennington Spit, off the coast of Hampshire. She was on a voyage from Newcastle upon Tyne, Northumberland to Dublin. She was refloated and resumed her voyage. |
| Méndez Núñez | Spanish Navy | Cantonal rebellion: The ironclad ran aground off Cartagena, Canton of Cartagena whilst attempting to recapture Numancia and Vitoria (both Cantonalist Rebels). |
| Mirian | United Kingdom | The ship departed from Troon, Ayrshire for Tralee, County Kerry. No further trace, presumed foundered with the loss of all hands. |

== 9 August ==
List of shipwrecks: 9 August 1873
| Ship | State | Description |
|---|---|---|
| Catherina | Germany | The schooner collided with the steamship Bahia (Germany) at Hamburg and sank. Her crew were rescued. Catherina was on a voyage from Hamburg to San Francisco, California, United States. |
| Countess of Minto | United Kingdom | The ship was driven ashore at Liverpool, Lancashire. She was on a voyage from Quebec City, Canada to Liverpool. She was refloated and taken in to Liverpool. |
| Dunmail | United Kingdom | The clipper was wrecked at the mouth of the River Mersey. All 63 people on board were rescued by lifeboats and tugs. She was on a voyage from Liverpool to Melbourne, Victoria. |
| Helen M. Rowley | United States | The ship was driven ashore at "Hellgate". She was on a voyage from New York to Liverpool. |
| Rangitolo | Victoria | The steamship was wrecked in the Cook Strait. All on board were rescued. She was on a voyage from Melbourne to New Zealand. |
| Septimus | Spain | The ship departed from Havana, Cuba for a British port. No further trace, presumed foundered with the loss of all hands. |

== 10 August ==
List of shipwrecks: 10 August 1873
| Ship | State | Description |
|---|---|---|
| A. W. McClellan | United Kingdom | The ship foundered in the Atlantic Ocean. Her crew were rescued by Carrie Annie (United Kingdom). A. W. McClellan was on a voyage from Lisbon, Portugal to Newport, Monmouthshire. |
| Chance | United Kingdom | The steam yacht sank in the River Tweed. She was refloated the next day. |
| Farmers | United Kingdom | The schooner ran aground on the Kimmeridge Ledge, in the English Channel off the coast of Dorset. |
| Far West | United Kingdom | The ship ran aground on the East Tylters, in the Baltic Sea off the coast of the Grand Duchy of Finland and was wrecked. Her crew were rescued. |
| Frithioff | United Kingdom | The barque caught fire in Ottoman Empire waters and was abandoned. Her crew survived. She was on a voyage from Leith, Lothian to Odesa, Russia. |
| Gratitude | United Kingdom | The ship brig was wrecked at Petten, North Holland, Netherlands with the loss of eight of the twelve people on board. She was on a voyage from London to Amsterdam, North Holland. |

== 11 August ==
List of shipwrecks: 11 August 1873
| Ship | State | Description |
|---|---|---|
| Agenoria | United Kingdom | The schooner struck the Splough Rock, off Greenore, County Wexford and consequently put in to Wexford. She was on a voyage from Ayr to Cork. |
| Copernicus | Norway | The barque ran aground on the Goodwin Sands, Kent, United Kingdom. She was refloated with assistance and taken in to The Downs. Subsequently towed in to Ramsgate, Kent. |
| Henrietta | United Kingdom | The ship departed from Barbados for Saint John's, Newfoundland Colony. No further trace, presumed foundered with the loss of all hands. |
| La Escosesa, and Muriel | United Kingdom | The clipper La Escosesa collided with the steamship Muriel and sank in the River Mersey. La Escosesa was on a voyage from Liverpool, Lancashire, United Kingdom to Callao, Peru. She was refloated on 13 August and taken in to Liverpool. Muriel was severely damaged. |

== 12 August ==
List of shipwrecks: 12 August 1873
| Ship | State | Description |
|---|---|---|
| Argus | United Kingdom | The ship was reported to be in a sinking condition off Cape Breton Island, Nova Scotia, Canada on this date, according to a message in a bottle that washed up at Velsen, North Holland, Netherlands around 26 September. |
| Arracan | France | The steamship was driven ashore on "Garfa Island", Maldives. All on board were rescued. She was on a voyage from Rangoon, Burma to an English port. |
| Elizabeth | France | The schooner foundered in the Bristol Channel south east of Worms Head, Glamorgan, United Kingdom with the loss of one of her five crew. Survivors were rescued by the schooner Pet (United Kingdom). Elizabeth was on a voyage from Swansea, Glamorgan to Saint-Malo, Ille-et-Vilaine. |
| Excelsior | United Kingdom | The steam wherry sank in the River Tyne at Jarrow, County Durham. |

== 13 August ==
List of shipwrecks: 13 August 1873
| Ship | State | Description |
|---|---|---|
| Eliza | United Kingdom | The ship was wrecked on the Ooster Bank, off the coast of Zeeland, Netherlands. Her seven crew were rescued. She was on a voyage from Sunderland, County Durham to Rotterdam, South Holland, Netherlands. |
| Hero | United Kingdom | The ship was run down and sunk in the North Sea by the steamship Brigadier.Her six crew were rescued by Brigadier. |
| Julius | Russia | The galeas ran aground off "Worms". She was on a voyage from Reval to Turku, Grand Duchy of Finland. |
| Penelope | Greece | The brig was driven ashore and wrecked at Beachy Head, Sussex, United Kingdom. |

== 14 August ==
List of shipwrecks: 14 August 1873
| Ship | State | Description |
|---|---|---|
| Abeona | United Kingdom | The barque was run into by the steamship Alabama (United Kingdom) and sank in the Firth of Clyde. Her eleven crew survived; three were rescued by Alabama. |
| Germania | United Kingdom | The schooner ran aground near Dragør, Denmark. She was on a voyage from Saint Petersburg, Russia to Dundee, Forfarshire. She was refloated with assistance and resumed her voyage. |
| Maria | France | The schooner was driven ashore on Terschelling, Friesland, Netherlands. She was on a voyage from Trondheim, Norway to Caen, Calvados. |

== 15 August ==
List of shipwrecks: 15 August 1873
| Ship | State | Description |
|---|---|---|
| Braviken | Sweden | The steamship ran aground off Landsort. She was on a voyage from Stockholm to Norrköping. She was later refloated and taken in to Hamra, Gotland. |
| Elizabeth | France | The ship foundered with the loss of a crew member. She was on a voyage from Swansea, Glamorgan, United Kingdom to Saint-Malo, Ille-et-Vilaine. |
| Frigga | Norway | The schooner was wrecked near Morup, Sweden. She was on a voyage from "Schjerup" to Copenhagen, Denmark. |
| La Vierge | France | The ship departed from Singapore, Straits Settlements for Rangoon, Burma. No further trace, presumed foundered with the loss of all hands. |
| Manchester | United Kingdom | The ship was driven ashore at Calais, France. She was refloated and taken in to Calais. |
| Sestos de Pononte | Peru | The barque was destroyed by fire at Lima. She was on a voyage from Callao to the Guañape Islands. |
| Susannah and Anna | United Kingdom | The ship foundered off Carrickfergus, County Antrim. Her crew were rescued. |
| Trave | Germany | The steamship ran aground at Copenhagen. She was on a voyage from Saint Petersburg, Russia to London, United Kingdom. |

== 16 August ==
List of shipwrecks: 16 August 1873
| Ship | State | Description |
|---|---|---|
| Betsey Bateman | United Kingdom | The schooner capsized and sank off Flamborough Head, Yorkshire in a squall. Her five crew were rescued by the steamships Cochrane and Grenadier (both United Kingdom). Betsey Bateman was on a voyage from the River Tyne to Poole, Dorset. |
| Coanwood | United Kingdom | The steamship ran aground near Waterford. She was on a voyage from Sulina, Ottoman Empire to Waterford. She was refloated and taken in to Waterford. |
| Fede in Dio | Flag unknown | The ship departed from New York, United States for Queenstown, County Cork, United Kingdom. No further trace, presumed foundered with the loss of all hands. |
| Nymph | United Kingdom | The cutter was driven ashore and damaged at Cairnryan, Wigtownshire. |
| Pioneer | United Kingdom | The steamboat caught fire and sank off Southport, Lancashire. |
| Vine | United Kingdom | The steamship was driven ashore at "Fahlund", Sweden. She was on a voyage from Riga, Russia to Grimsby, Lincolnshire. |

== 17 August ==
List of shipwrecks: 17 August 1873
| Ship | State | Description |
|---|---|---|
| Idris | United Kingdom | The schooner struck rocks off the "North and South Lighthouse" and was beached near Cairnryan, Wigtownshire. She was on a voyage from Runcorn, Cheshire to Londonderry. She was refloated and towed in to Stranraer, Wigtownshire in a waterlogged condition by the steamship Penguin (United Kingdom). |
| Jura | Norway | The ship was driven ashore and wrecked at Agger, Denmark. She was on a voyage from a Dutch port to a Finnish port. |

== 18 August ==
List of shipwrecks: 18 August 1873
| Ship | State | Description |
|---|---|---|
| Lizzie | United Kingdom | The schooner struck the pier and was driven ashore at Maryport, Cumberland. |

== 19 August ==
List of shipwrecks: 19 August 1873
| Ship | State | Description |
|---|---|---|
| Ellen | United Kingdom | The smack foundered off The Maidens Lighthouses, County Antrim. Her crew survived. She was on a voyage from Ayr to Belfast, County Antrim. |
| Hound | Canada | The brigantine was wrecked in a hurricane in the Atlantic Ocean. Two of her eight crew died before the survivors were rescued on 5 September by Harp (United Kingdom); one of those rescued died shortly afterwards. Hound was on a voyage from Halifax, Nova Scotia to San Juan, Puerto Rico. |
| Margaret McColl | United Kingdom | The schooner ran aground at Ballyness, County Donegal. |

== 20 August ==
List of shipwrecks: 20 August 1873
| Ship | State | Description |
|---|---|---|
| Mystery | United Kingdom | The schooner sprang a leak and was beached at Rye Harbour, Sussex. She was on a voyage from Hastings to Rye, Sussex. She was later refloated and taken in to Rye Harbour. |
| Norina | Austria-Hungary | The barque was driven ashore near "Mires", Greece. She was on a voyage from Newport, Monmouthshire, United Kingdom to Syros, Greece. |

== 21 August ==
List of shipwrecks: 21 August 1873
| Ship | State | Description |
|---|---|---|
| Adela | United Kingdom | The steamship ran aground at Workington, Cumberland. She was on a voyage from Bilbao, Spain to Workington. |
| Peace | United Kingdom | The brig was driven ashore and wrecked at Ryhope, County Durham. Her crew were rescued. |
| Ureariel | Germany | The barque was driven ashore in the Pentland Firth. She was on a voyage from Stettin to Bristol, Gloucestershire, United Kingdom. She was refloated and resumed her voyage. |

== 23 August ==
List of shipwrecks: 23 August 1873
| Ship | State | Description |
|---|---|---|
| Amado | Italy | The ship ran aground on the Oyster Bank, in the River Laggan. She was on a voyage from Philadelphia, Pennsylvania, United States to Belfast, County Antrim, United Kingdom. |
| Anlaby | United Kingdom | The steamship was driven ashore of the Isle of May, Fife and sank at the stern. She was on a voyage from Granton, Lothian to Danzig, Germany. She subsequently broke in two. |
| Ann Bradshaw | United Kingdom | The brig collided with the steamship Beverley in the River Mersey and was consequently beached at Tranmere, Cheshire in a waterlogged condition. Ann Bradshaw was on a voyage from Huelva, Spain to Garston, Lancashire. She was refloated on 26 August and taken in to Garston. |
| Camel | United Kingdom | The steamship ran aground at Saint-Valery-sur-Somme, Somme, France. She was on a voyage from Swansea, Glamorgan to Saint-Valery-sur-Somme. She was refloated and taken into port. |
| Ecureuil | France | The barque was driven ashore and wrecked in the Maldives. Her crew were rescued. She was on a voyage from the Maldives to Singapore, Straits Settlements. |
| Gitanella | United Kingdom | The barque was driven ashore on Rathlin Island, County Antrim. She was refloated. |
| Prompt | United Kingdom | The steamship foundered off Cabo da Roca, Portugal. Her crew survived. She was on a voyage from Huelva, Spain to Newcastle upon Tyne, Northumberland. |
| Royal Alexander | United Kingdom | The ship ran aground on the Pluckington Bank, in Liverpool Bay. She was on a voyage from Bombay, India to Liverpool, Lancashire. She was refloated. |
| Trafik | Sweden | The steamship ran aground and sank at Söderhamn. She was on a voyage from Gävle to Sundsvall. |

== 24 August ==
A major hurricane struck Nova Scotia on this date, resulting in the loss of 1,122 vessels, 900 buildings and 600 lives.

List of shipwrecks: 24 August 1873
| Ship | State | Description |
|---|---|---|
| Acadia | Canada | The schooner was driven ashore on the coast of Nova Scotia. |
| Achaies | United Kingdom | The brig was driven ashore at Richibucto, New Brunswick, Canada. |
| Addie M. Story | United States | The fishing schooner was ashore at Port Hood, Nova Scotia, refloated and proceeded to Canso, Nova Scotia. |
| Adela | Canada | The barque was driven ashore or wrecked at North Sydney, Nova Scotia. |
| A. H. Wonson | United States | The fishing schooner sank in a gale on the Grand Banks. Lost with all 10 crew. |
| Alan | United Kingdom | The barque went ashore and was wrecked at Hog Island at the entrance to Malpeque Bay, Prince Edward Island, Canada. Only 4 crew made it to shore, the Captain of the "Dominion" rescued the boatswain, 7 crew died. She was on a voyage from Montreal, Quebec, Canada to Falmouth, Cornwall. |
| Albert | Canada | The barque was damaged at Cow Bay, Nova Scotia. |
| Albert the Good | Canada | The barque was driven ashore or damaged at Sydney, Nova Scotia. She was consequently condemned, but was refloated in late November and taken in to Halifax, Nova Scotia. |
| Alice | Canada | The barque was driven ashore or damaged at Sydney. |
| Alice Stuart | Canada | The brig was driven ashore at Cow Bay. |
| Alpha | Canada | The steamship was driven ashore and wrecked at Sydney. She was on a voyage from Sydney to Halifax. |
| Altan | United Kingdom | The ship was wrecked at Charlottetown, Prince Edward Island with the loss of all but three of her crew. She was on a voyage from Montreal to Queenstown, County Cork. |
| Amelia | Canada | The schooner was driven ashore at Sydney. |
| Amelia | Canada | The brig was driven ashore or wrecked at North Sydney. |
| Amos Cutter | United States | The fishing schooner was lost off Canso, Nova Scotia. |
| Angie S. Friend | United States | The fishing schooner was lost at anchor in the Gulf of St. Lawrence off East Point. Lost with all 13-15 crew. |
| Annie C. Norwood | United States | The fishing schooner was aground off Nova Scotia, refloated. |
| Arctic | Canada | The schooner was driven ashore or damaged at Sydney. |
| Arizona | United States | The fishing schooner was ashore in the Magdalen Islands with slight damage, probably refloated. |
| Arthur | Canada | The brig was wrecked at sea. She was on a voyage from Boston, Massachusetts, United States to Halifax. The wreck was towed in to Halifax by HMS Spartan (Royal Navy). |
| Belle Gilmore | United States | The fishing schooner was ashore at St. Peters, Nova Scotia with slight damage, probably refloated. |
| Bessie | Canada | The brig was driven ashore or wrecked at North Sydney. |
| B. Gilkey | Canada | The schooner was driven ashore or damaged at Sydney. |
| Bjorn Farmand | Flag unknown | The ship was driven ashore at Shediac, Nova Scotia. |
| Bloomer | Canada | The schooner was driven ashore at Pictou, Nova Scotia. |
| Bonny Bell | Canada | The schooner was driven ashore at Isaac's Harbour, Nova Scotia. |
| Bonnie Jean | Canada | The Schooner went ashore and was wrecked with all 10 hands at Cavendish, Prince Edward Island. |
| Brothers | Canada | The schooner was driven ashore on the coast of Nova Scotia. |
| Carrie P. Rich | United States | The fishing schooner was wrecked on North Cape, Prince Edward Island, Canada. Lost with all 17 crew. |
| Catalina | United States | The fishing schooner was ashore in the Magdalen Islands with slight damage, probably refloated. |
| "Centre Point" | United States | The Schooner was probably lost on the Banks with all 11 hands. |
| Centurian | United States | The fishing schooner was wrecked at Ship Harbor, Nova Scotia, later condemned, or only with slight damage, prossibly refloated. Crew saved. |
| Charles | Canada | The schooner was driven ashore or wrecked at North Sydney. |
| Charles C. Dame | United States | The fishing schooner was wrecked on North Cape, Prince Edward Island, Canada. Lost with all 18 crew. |
| Charles E. Scammell | Canada | The barque was driven ashore or wrecked at North Sydney. |
| Charles Murdoch | Canada | The barque was driven ashore or wrecked at North Sydney. |
| Charles P. Barrett | United States | The fishing schooner was ashore in the Magdalen Islands with slight damage, probably refloated. |
| Charles P. Thompson | United States | The fishing schooner was ashore in the Magdalen Islands with slight damage, probably refloated. |
| Charlotte Augusta | United States | The fishing schooner was ashore in the Magdalen Islands with slight damage, probably refloated. |
| Chase | Canada | The schooner was driven ashore at Sydney. |
| Chillianwallah | Canada | The barque was driven ashore or damaged at Sydney. |
| Christie | Canada | The schooner was driven ashore or wrecked at North Sydney. |
| Clyde | United Kingdom | The schooner was driven ashore at Port Mulgrave, Nova Scotia. |
| Clytie | United States | The fishing schooner was ashore at Port Mulgrave with slight damage, probably refloated. |
| Constitution | United States | The fishing schooner was ashore at Harbor Bouche with $300 in damage, probably refloated. |
| C. P. Thompson | United States | The fishing schooner was ashore in the Magdalen Islands. |
| Desiderata | Canada | The barque was damaged at Cow Bay. |
| D. H. Mansfield | United States | The fishing schooner was wrecked in the Magdalen Islands, later condemned, or with slight damage, possibly refloated. Crew saved. |
| "Dominion" | Canada | The Schooner went ashore and was wrecked at Hog Island at the entrance to Malpeque Bay, Prince Edward Island, Canada, a total loss. Crew made it to shore. |
| Eagle | Canada | The brigantine was driven ashore at "Point St. Peter", Nova Scotia. |
| Ebro | Canada | The schooner was wrecked on Cape Breton Island, Nova Scotia. |
| E. C. Mulet | Canada | The brig was driven ashore on the coast on Nova Scotia. |
| "Edith" | Canada | The Barque went ashore at Hog Island at Malpeque, Prince Edward Island, Canada. Later refloated. crew saved. |
| El Dorado | United States | The Schooner was probably lost at White Head, Nova Scotia with all 7 hands. |
| Electra | Canada | The barque was damaged at North Sydney. |
| Electric Flash | United States | The fishing schooner was ashore in the Magdalen Islands with slight damage, probably refloated. |
| Elihu Burritt | United States | The fishing schooner was aground off Nova Scotia. |
| Eliza Christie | Canada | The schooner was driven ashore at Sydney. |
| Ellen | Canada | The schooner was driven ashore at "Cleardown". |
| Ellen | Canada | The schooner was driven ashore at Sydney. |
| Ellen Bondrot | Canada | The brigantine was wrecked in Cariboo Cove, Nova Scotia. |
| Ellen Jane | Canada | The schooner was driven ashore or wrecked at North Sydney. |
| E. L. Rowe | United States | The fishing schooner was ashore in the Magdalen Islands with slight damage, probably refloated. |
| Enola C. | United States | The fishing schooner was ashore in the Magdalen Islands, a total loss. Crew and cargo saved. |
| E. S. Smith | United States | The schooner was wrecked at Amherst, Nova Scotia with the loss of three of her crew. |
| Eugenie | Canada | The schooner was driven ashore at Gaspé, Quebec. |
| Eugenie | Canada | The schooner was driven ashore at "Cleardown". |
| Eureka | United Kingdom | The ship was driven ashore at "Grand Bras d'Or". |
| Eurine, or Euxine | Canada | The schooner was driven ashore and wrecked at North Sydney. |
| Evangiline | United States | The fishing schooner was ashore at Harbor Bouche with slight damage, probably refloated. |
| "Faith" | United Kingdom | The Brig sank at anchor off the harbor of Alberton, Prince Edward Island, Canada during the storm when her cargo of railroad rails broke loose and punctured her bottom. Lost with all hands. |
| Fanny M. Carvill | Canada | The barque was damaged at Cow Bay. She was consequently condemned, but was refloated in late November. |
| Far West | United States | The fishing schooner was wrecked at Port Mulgrave, Nova Scotia, later condemned. crew saved. |
| Ferguson | Canada | The ship was driven ashore at Pictou. |
| F. M. Howard | Canada | The schooner was driven ashore or wrecked at North Sydney. |
| Formosa | Canada | The barque was driven ashore at Richibucto. She was later refloated. |
| Freedom | United States | The fishing schooner was ashore in the Magdalen Islands with slight damage, probably refloated. |
| G. W. Moore | Canada | The schooner was driven ashore or wrecked at North Sydney. |
| George Hughes | Canada | The schooner was driven ashore or damaged at Sydney. |
| Georgiana | Canada | The schooner was driven ashore at Sydney. |
| Georgina | Canada | The brig was driven ashore or wrecked at North Sydney. |
| G. J. Troop | Canada | The brig was driven ashore at Cow Bay. She was consequently condemned. |
| Glad Tidings | United Kingdom | The ship was driven ashore at Louisbourg, Nova Scotia. |
| Glen | Canada | The schooner was driven ashore at Gaspé. |
| Gloriana | United Kingdom | The full-rigged ship caught fire and was abandoned in the Atlantic Ocean 200 nautical miles (370 km) east by south of Halifax with the loss of a crew member. Survivors were rescued by a fishing vessel. She was on a voyage from London to Saint John, New Brunswick. |
| G. McRae | Canada | The ship was driven ashore and wrecked at Sydney. |
| Grant | Canada | The ship was driven ashore and wrecked at Sydney. |
| G. P. Paysant | Canada | The barque was damaged at Sydney. She was consequently condemned. |
| G. Troop | Canada | The barque was driven ashore or damaged at Sydney. |
| Guide | Canada | The brig was driven ashore or wrecked at North Sydney. |
| Guide | Canada | The schooner was driven ashore at Sydney. |
| G. W. More | Canada | The schooner was driven ashore at Sydney. |
| Hart | Canada | The schooner was driven ashore at Pictou. |
| Harriett | Canada | The schooner was driven ashore or damaged at Sydney. |
| Hattie R. | Canada | The brig was driven ashore or wrecked at Cow Bay. |
| Henry Clay | United States | The Schooner was lost returning to Gloucester, Massachusetts from the Banks with all 10 hands. |
| H. Haviland | Canada | The schooner was driven ashore or damaged at Sydney. |
| High Flier | United States | The fishing schooner was ashore in the Magdalen Islands, a total loss. crew saved. |
| Humber | Canada | The schooner was driven ashore or wrecked at North Sydney. |
| James Duncan | Canada | The ship was driven onto a mud bank at Pugwash, Nova Scotia, Canada. She was on a voyage from Liverpool, Lancashire to Charlottetown. Her deck cargo was lightered and she was pulled off, she resumed her voyage a week later |
| James G. Tarr | United States | The schooner was lost with all 18 hands, wreckage and 2 bodies came ashore at Campbellton. |
| Jane | Canada | The schooner was driven ashore at Sydney. |
| Jane and Eliza | Canada | The schooner was driven ashore or wrecked at North Sydney. |
| J. B. Gilkie | Canada | The schooner was driven ashore at Cow Bay. |
| Jedde | Canada | The schooner was driven ashore at Cow Bay. |
| Jeddo | Canada | The schooner was driven ashore or wrecked at Sydney. |
| Jesse | Canada | The schooner was driven ashore at Pictou. |
| Jessie | Canada | The brig was driven ashore or wrecked at North Sydney. |
| J. Howland | Canada | The ship was damaged at Cow Bay. |
| J. J. Marshall | Canada | The Schooner was driven ashore at Brule Point in Tatamagouche Bay. |
| J. M. Howard | Canada | The schooner was driven ashore or wrecked at North Sydney. |
| J. N. Colville | Canada | The barque was driven ashore or damaged at Sydney. |
| John Gilpin | Canada | The schooner was driven ashore or wrecked at North Sydney. |
| John J. Clark | United States | The fishing schooner was ashore in the Magdalen Islands with slight damage, probably refloated. |
| John Richards | United Kingdom | The brig was driven ashore at Richibucto. |
| John Scott | United Kingdom | The ship was wrecked at Louisbourg. |
| Josephine | Canada | The schooner was driven ashore or wrecked at North Sydney. |
| Josie | Canada | The brig was driven ashore or wrecked at North Sydney. |
| J. R. Homer | Canada | The schooner was driven ashore at Sydney. |
| Katie, or Katy | Canada | The brig was driven ashore or wrecked at North Sydney. |
| Kewadin | Canada | The ship was wrecked at Cascumpec Sandhills at the entrance to the harbor of Alberton, Prince Edward Island. Later refloated. Crew saved. |
| Khandanghaner II | Flag unknown | The ship was driven ashore at Whitby, Yorkshire, United Kingdom. She was on a voyage from the Nieuw Diep to the River Tyne. She was refloated with the assistance of a tug. |
| Knight Templar | United States | The fishing schooner was ashore at North Sydney, Nova Scotia badly damage, possibly refloated. |
| Lancashire Witch | Canada | The barque was driven ashore or wrecked at North Sydney. |
| La Plata | Canada | The brig was driven ashore at Cow Bay. |
| Little Hugh | Canada | The schooner was driven ashore at Pictou. |
| Lochiel | Flag unknown | The barque was driven ashore at Richibucto. |
| Lord Bury | Canada | The schooner was driven ashore at Isaac's Harbour. |
| Lucretia | United Kingdom | The ship was wrecked at Louisbourg. |
| Lucy | Canada | The barque was driven ashore or damaged at Sydney. |
| Lucy | Canada | The brig was driven ashore at Cow Bay. |
| Lydia A. Harvey | United States | The vessel was ashore at East Point Chapel with slight damage, probably refloated. |
| Maggie | Canada | The ship was driven ashore at Cascumpec Sandhills at the entrance to the harbor of Alberton, Prince Edward Island. Later refloated. Crew saved. |
| Maggie | Canada | The schooner was driven ashore or wrecked at North Sydney. |
| Magian | Canada | The ship was driven ashore and wrecked at Sydney. |
| Margaret Jane | Canada | The schooner was driven ashore or wrecked at North Sydney. |
| Margaret Jane | Canada | The schooner was driven ashore at Buctouche, New Brunswick. |
| Marion Grimes | United States | The fishing schooner was ashore in the Magdalen Islands. |
| Martha | Canada | The brig was driven ashore or wrecked at Cow Bay. |
| Mary | Canada | The schooner was driven ashore or wrecked at North Sydney. |
| Mary | Canada | The schooner was driven ashore at Cow Bay. |
| Mary and Charles | Canada | The schooner was driven ashore or wrecked at North Sydney. |
| Mary Hart | Canada | The schooner was wrecked off Owls's Head, Nova Scotia. Her crew were rescued. She was on a voyage from Halifax to Cape Breton Island. |
| Mary Jane | Canada | The schooner was driven ashore or wrecked at North Sydney. |
| Mary Kate | Canada | The schooner was driven ashore at Tatamagouche Head in Tatamagouche Bay. |
| Mary S. Hurd | United States | The fishing schooner was wrecked on Cape Canso, Nova Scotia, condemned. Crew was saved. |
| Matilda | Canada | The ship was driven ashore and wrecked at Sydney. |
| Matilda K. Hunter | Canada | The brig was driven ashore or wrecked at North Sydney. |
| McDonald Emanuel | Canada | The ship was driven ashore at Pictou. |
| Meggie Wodd | Canada | The schooner was driven ashore at Cow Bay. |
| Messang | France | The schooner was abandoned at sea. She was on a voyage from Halifax to Saint-Pierre. |
| Messina | Canada | The ship was driven wrecked at Port Mulgrave. |
| Mexican | Canada | The barque was damaged at Cow Bay. She was consequently condemned. |
| Morning Star | United States | The fishing schooner was ashore at Port Mulgrave. |
| Moses Rogers | Canada | The brig was driven ashore at Cow Bay. She was refloated in late November. |
| Murdoch | Canada | The barque was driven ashore or wrecked at North Sydney. |
| "Muscongus" | United Kingdom | The Barque went ashore and was wrecked at Stanhope, Prince Edward Island, Canada. |
| Nancy | Canada | The ship was driven ashore and wrecked at Sydney. |
| N. Churchill | Canada | The barque was damaged at Sydney. She was consequently condemned, but was refloated on 4 November. |
| N. Hale | Canada | The brig was driven ashore or wrecked at Cow Bay. |
| Nora | Canada | The barque was driven ashore at Buctouche. |
| Nordstjernen | Norway | The barque was driven ashore at Wallace, Nova Scotia. She was later refloated. |
| Octavia | Canada | The schooner was driven ashore at Cow Bay. |
| Olivia | Canada | The schooner was driven ashore at Cow Bay. |
| Oliver Eldredge | United States | The fishing schooner was ashore in the Magdalen Islands with slight damage, probably refloated. |
| Ontario | Canada | The barque was driven ashore or wrecked at North Sydney. |
| Onward | Canada | The schooner was driven ashore or wrecked at Cow Bay. |
| Orloff | Canada | The barque was driven ashore or damaged at Sydney. |
| Orloff | Canada | The brig was driven ashore at Cow Bay. |
| Pohono | Canada | The barque was damaged at Sydney. |
| Pomona | Canada | The barque was damaged at Sydney. |
| Port | Canada | The brig was driven ashore or wrecked at Cow Bay. |
| USS Powhatan | United States Navy | The paddle frigate was driven from her moorings and struck the quayside at Halifax. |
| P. R. C. | Canada | The brig was driven ashore and wrecked on Pictou Island, Nova Scotia. |
| Rambler | United Kingdom | The schooner was wrecked in North Bay, County Wexford. Her crew were rescued by the Wexford Lifeboat. She was on a voyage from Liverpool, Lancashire to Wexford. She was refloated on 8 September and towed in to Wexford. |
| Rebecca Anne | Canada | The ship was driven ashore at Cape Bauld, Newfoundland Colony. |
| Renfrew | Canada | The schooner was driven ashore at Isaac's Harbour. |
| Return | Canada | The schooner was driven ashore at Cow Bay. |
| Roderick McRae | Canada | The schooner was driven ashore or wrecked at North Sydney. |
| Rogers | Canada | The brig was driven ashore or wrecked at Cow Bay. |
| Royal Arch | United States | The Schooner was lost at White Head, Nova Scotia with all 14 hands plus 5 passengers, a woman and her 4 children. |
| Russell | Canada | The schooner was driven ashore at Isaac's Harbour. |
| Saltwell | United Kingdom | The steamship was wrecked on Scatarie Island, Nova Scotia with the loss of twenty of her 28 crew. She was on a voyage from London to New York, United States. |
| Samuel Crowell | United States | The fishing schooner sank in the Hurricane on the way home to Gloucester, Massachusetts from the Banks fishing grounds. Lost with all 15 crew. |
| Seabird | Canada | The schooner was driven ashore at Buctouche. |
| Seaton | United Kingdom | The steamship was driven ashore at Ryhope, County Durham. She was on a voyage from Ostend, West Flanders, Belgium to Sunderland, County Durham. Seaton was refloated on 27 August and taken in to Sunderland. |
| Shasta | Canada | The ship was damaged at Cow Bay. |
| Silver Cloud | Canada | The barque was driven ashore or damaged at Sydney. |
| St. Louis | United Kingdom | The steamship struck the Gib Rock and sank. Her crew were rescued. She was on a voyage from Liverpool to Philadelphia, Pennsylvania, United States. |
| Superb | Canada | The schooner was driven ashore or damaged at Sydney. |
| Swift | (United Kingdom of Great Britain and Ireland) Jersey | The barque was damaged at Amherst when an American schooner drove into her. |
| Teddo | Canada | The schooner was driven ashore or damaged at Sydney. |
| Win. A. Pew | United States | The fishing schooner was aground off the coast of Nova Scotia. |
| Teme | Canada | The schooner was driven ashore at Pugwash, Nova Scotia with the loss of two lives. |
| Temperance | Canada | The schooner was driven ashore or wrecked at North Sydney. |
| Thetis | Canada | The fishing schooner was wrecked on the north coast of Prince Edward Island with the loss of all twelve crew. |
| T. Hunter | Canada | The ship was driven ashore and wrecked at Sydney. |
| Trial | Canada | The schooner was driven ashore at Pictou. |
| Typhoon | United States | The fishing schooner was wrecked at Harbor Le Bar in the Magdalen Islands, later condemned. Crew saved. |
| Undine | United Kingdom | The barque was driven ashore at Richibucto. Three crew killed, rest jumped to safety. |
| Valiant | Canada | The ship was driven ashore and wrecked at Sydney. |
| Venture | Canada | The barque was driven ashore or wrecked at North Sydney. |
| Venture | Canada | The schooner was driven ashore at Pictou. |
| Victoria | Canada | The schooner was driven ashore at Sydney. |
| Victoria | Canada | The brig was driven ashore or wrecked at North Sydney. |
| Victoria Amelia | Canada | The brig was driven ashore or wrecked at North Sydney. |
| Vibilia | United Kingdom | The ship was either dismasted or foundered in Cow Bay. |
| Volante | Canada | The brig was driven ashore or wrecked at North Sydney. |
| W. D. | Canada | The schooner was driven ashore at Cow Bay. |
| Welcome | Canada | The schooner was driven ashore at Cow Bay. |
| W. H. Hale | Canada | The schooner was driven ashore at Cow Bay. |
| White Star | United Kingdom | The barque was driven ashore at Richibucto. |
| Wild Briar | Canada | The schooner was driven ashore or wrecked at North Sydney. |
| William H. Raymond | United States | The fishing schooner was ashore in the Magdalen Islands with slight damage, probably refloated. |
| William H. Thurston | United States | The fishing schooner was ashore in the Magdalen Islands. |
| Willow Brae | Canada | The brig was driven ashore at Pictou. |
| Wixande | (Canada) | The schooner was driven ashore and wrecked in the Magdalen Islands, Nova Scotia. Her crew survived. |
| Zephyr | Canada | The schooner was driven ashore or wrecked at North Sydney. |
| Zeroni | Canada | The Brig was wrecked near Merigomish, Nova Scotia, in Northumberland Strait. |
| Unnamed | Canada | The barque was wrecked at Malpeque, Prince Edward Island. |
| Several unnamed vessels | Canada | The schooners were driven ashore and wrecked at Buctouche. |
| Unnamed | Canada | The brigantine capsized at North Sydney. |
| Twenty-three unnamed vessels | Canada | The schooners were driven ashore in the Gut of Canso. |
| Several unnamed vessels | Canada | Seven barques and several brigs was driven ashore at Richibucto. Several schooners were wrecked. Five square-rigged vessels were reported to have been driven ashore. |
| Several unnamed vessels | Canada | Two ships and several schooners were driven ashore at Miramichi, New Brunswick. |
| Unnamed | Canada | The schooner was driven ashore at Ketch Harbour, Nova Scotia. |
| Seven unnamed vessels | Canada | The ships were driven ashore and wrecked at Richibucto. |
| Three unnamed vessels | Canada | The schooners broke from their moorings and were damaged at Hantsport, Nova Scotia. |
| Three unnamed vessels | Canada | The schooners were driven ashore at Frazer's Point, Nova Scotia. |
| Three unnamed vessels | Canada | The schooners were driven ashore at Albion Mines, Nova Scotia. |
| Unnamed | Canada | The schooner was driven ashore at Pictou Landing, Nova Scotia. |
| Unnamed | Canada | The brig was driven ashore in Pond's Gulf, Nova Scotia. |
| Four unnamed vessels | Canada | The schooners were driven ashore in the Gosse River, Cumberland County, Nova Scotia. |
| Two unnamed vessels | United States | The fishing schooners foundered off North Cape, Prince Edward Island with the loss of all 40 crew. |
| Twenty-seven unnamed vessels | Canada | The ships were driven ashore or damaged at Cow Bay. |
| Four unnamed vessels | Canada | The ships were driven ashore at Bayfield, Nova Scotia. |
| Twelve unnamed vessels | Canada | The ships were driven ashore at Pictou. |
| Four unnamed vessels | Canada | The ships were driven ashore at Port Hood, Nova Scotia. |
| Five unnamed vessels | Canada | The ships were driven ashore at Port Mulgrave. |
| Four unnamed vessels | Canada | The ships were driven ashore at Plaister Cove. |
| Four unnamed vessels | Canada | The ships were driven ashore at Port Hawkesbury, Nova Scotia. |
| Eight unnamed vessels | Canada | The ships were driven ashore at Guysborough, Nova Scotia. |
| Many unnamed vessels | Canada | More than 30 ships were driven ashore at or near Point Caledonia. |
| Thirty-six unnamed vessels | United States | The fishing vessels were lost off the coast of Nova Scotia. All hands of two vessels, and two hands from a third, we lost - 35 lives. |
| Unnamed | Royal Navy | The gunboat was driven ashore at Richibucto. |
| Several unnamed vessels | (Dominion of Newfoundland) Newfoundland Colony | The fishing boats and whalers were driven ashore at Island Cove. |
| Unnamed | Canada | The schooner sank at Beaver Harbour, Nova Scotia. |
| Several unnamed vessels | Canada | The fishing vessels were driven out to sea from Beaver Harbour and were presumed lost. |
| Several unnamed vessels | Canada | The ships were driven ashore at, or driven out to sea from, St. Peter's, Nova Scotia. |
| Unnamed | United States | The brig was driven ashore in Pend's Gulf. |
| Fifty-two unnamed vessels | Canada | The fishing schooners were driven ashore and wrecked in the Magdalen Islands. At least three people were killed. |
| Unnamed | Canada | The barque was driven ashore and wrecked in the Magdalen Islands. All on board, more than 200 people, were rescued. |
| Unnamed | Canada | The schooner was driven ashore and severely damaged on Entrice Island, Magdalen Islands. |
| Twenty-six unnamed vessels | France | The fishing vessels foundered at Cow Head, each with the loss of all hands. |
| Unnamed | Canada | The brigantine capsized, was driven ashore and wrecked at "Picoe" with the loss of all seventeen people on board. |
| Sixty-nine unnamed vessels | United Kingdom | Forty-three vessels were driven ashore and wrecked and 26 more were damaged at Amherst. |
| Eight unnamed vessels | United States | The schooners were driven ashore between Amherst and Bacque. |
| Three unknown schooners | Canada | The Schooners was driven ashore at Rocky Point, Prince Edward Island. |

== 25 August ==
List of shipwrecks: 25 August 1873
| Ship | State | Description |
|---|---|---|
| Elizabeth | United Kingdom | The ship collided with the steamship Clutha (United Kingdom) and sank at Swansea, Glamorgan. She was on a voyage from a Cornish port to Swansea. She was refloated. |
| William M. Reed | United States | The ship was driven ashore at Dungeness, Kent, United Kingdom. She was on a voyage from Bremen, Germany to Cardiff, Glamorgan, United Kingdom. She was refloated the next day. |

== 26 August ==
List of shipwrecks: 26 August 1873
| Ship | State | Description |
|---|---|---|
| J. C. Norton | Canada | The brig was abandoned in the Atlantic Ocean (36°34′N 61°24′W). Her crew were rescued by the steamship Delta ( Canada). J. C. Norton was on a voyage from Halifax, Nova Scotia to Prince Edward Island. |
| Perseverance | United Kingdom | The steam wherry capsized and sank at South Shields, County Durham. |
| Qui qu'en Grogne | France | The brig ran aground "on Cavezos". She was on a voyage from Saint John's, Newfoundland Colony to Marseille, Bouches-du-Rhône. She was refloated and beached at Gibraltar. |
| Ruby | United States | The steamship sank at Shreveport, Louisiana due to a stampede of cattle on board. Her crew survived. |

== 27 August ==
List of shipwrecks: 27 August 1873
| Ship | State | Description |
|---|---|---|
| Belle Vernon | United States | The steamboat struck the wreck of Jennie Howell (United States and sank in the Ohio River at Shawneetown, Illinois. Two people were reported missing. |
| Emile | New Zealand | The 214-ton brig was driven ashore and wrecked at Oamaru by a cyclone which hit the east coast of the South Island. She was on a voyage from Newcastle, New South Wales to Oamaru. |
| Ethiopia | United Kingdom | The steamship was wrecked at Cape Negrais, Burma. All on board were rescued. She was on a voyage from Calcutta, India to Rangoon, Burma. |
| Fairy Queen | New Zealand | The 214-ton brig parted her cable and was driven ashore at Timaru by a cyclone which hit the east coast of the South Island. |
| Faith | United Kingdom | The ship was wrecked at Cascumpec, Prince Edward Island, Canada. |
| H. H. and R. | United Kingdom | The sloop was discovered in the English Channel 40 nautical miles (74 km) south west of Portland, Dorset by the steamship Veritas (United Kingdom), which towed her in to Weymouth, Dorset. H. H. and R. was on a voyage from London to HMNB Devonport. |
| Maria | France | The fishing vessel collided with Jeanne et Robert (France) and sank in the English Channel 12 nautical miles (22 km) north of Havre de Grâce, Seine-Inférieure. Her crew were rescued. |
| Scotsman | New Zealand | The 231-ton brig was driven ashore and wrecked at Oamaru by a cyclone. |
| Surprise | United Kingdom | The yacht ran aground at Caernarfon. She was refloated and taken in to Holyhead, Anglesey. |
| Wanderer | New Zealand | The ketch was driven ashore at Timaru by a cyclone. |
| Young Hunter | United Kingdom | The schooner was wrecked on a sandbank in the Irish Sea off the coast of Lancashire. Her crew were rescued by the schooner Express (United Kingdom). Young Hunter was on a voyage from Glasgow, Renfrewshire to Fleetwood, Lancashire. |

== 28 August ==
List of shipwrecks: 28 August 1873
| Ship | State | Description |
|---|---|---|
| Chin Chin | United Kingdom | The ship capsized at Cardiff, Glamorgan and was severely damaged. |
| J. R. Robinson | United Kingdom | The ship was wrecked in the Meiaco Sima Islands. Her crew survived. She was on a voyage from Fuzhou, China to Adelaide, South Australia. |
| La Clarisse | France | The schooner was driven ashore and wrecked at Boulogne, Pas-de-Calais. Her seven crew were rescued by the Boulogne Lifeboat Frédéric Sauvage (France). La Clarisse was on a voyage from Caen, Calvados to Newcastle upon Tyne, Northumberland, United Kingdom. |
| May Queen | United Kingdom | The fishing smack collided with the fishing vessel Vivid (United Kingdom and foundered in the North Sea 15 to 20 nautical miles (28 to 37 km) off Bridlington, Yorkshire with the loss of three of her five crew. |
| Ranger | United Kingdom | The yacht was driven ashore on Alderney, Channel Island. All three people on board were rescued. She was on a voyage from Guernsey, Channel Islands to Gilette, Alpes-Maritimes, France. |
| T. E. Lemon | United Kingdom | The ship sank in Liverpool Bay east of the Crosby Lightship ( Trinity House) with the loss of four of her 26 crew. The Mersey Docks and Harbour Board Lifeboat rescued twelve of the survivors, the rest reached shore in the gig and longboat. She was on a voyage from Liverpool, Lancashire to Sapelo Island, Georgia, United States. |
| Triton | Germany | The barque was wrecked on the Mixon Shoal, in the Bristol Channel with the loss of two of her eight crew. Survivors were rescued by the paddle tugs Digby Grand, Flying Cloud, Pero Gomez (all United Kingdom) and the Swansea Lifeboat Wolverhampton ( Royal National Lifeboat Institution). |
| Unnamed | Flag unknown | The brig ran aground and sank on the Goodwin Sands, Kent, United Kingdom. |

== 29 August ==
List of shipwrecks: 29 August 1873
| Ship | State | Description |
|---|---|---|
| Ada | United Kingdom | The schooner ran aground at the mouth of the River Mersey. She was on a voyage from Poole, Dorset to Runcorn, Cheshire. She was refloated and then collided with the yacht Wavelet (United Kingdom) and was beached in the Sloyne. |
| Ironsides | United States | The paddle steamer ran aground at Hog Island, Virginia, and was lost. |
| Mary West | United Kingdom | The ship was driven ashore at Lytham St. Annes, Lancashire. She was on a voyage from Liverpool, Lancashire to Saint-Louis, Senegal. She was refloated on 5 September and towed in to Liverpool. |

== 30 August ==
List of shipwrecks: 30 August 1873
| Ship | State | Description |
|---|---|---|
| Breeze | United Kingdom | The brig was abandoned in the Atlantic Ocean (30°58′N 74°30′W). Her nine crew were rescued by the brigantine Carmen (Spain). Breeze was on a voyage from Saint Helena to London. |
| Charlotte Christine | Germany | The barque was wrecked. All on board were rescued by the corvette Vityaz (Imperial Russian Navy). Charlotte Christine was on a voyage from Vladivostok, Russia to Yantai, China. |
| William | United Kingdom | The brig was damaged by fire at West Hartlepool, County Durham. |

== 31 August ==
List of shipwrecks: 31 August 1873
| Ship | State | Description |
|---|---|---|
| Albion | United Kingdom | The ship was driven ashore and wrecked in the Swash, in the Bristol Channel. She was on a voyage from Callao, Peru to Cork. She was refloated on 5 September and taken in to the Kingroad. |
| Danube | United Kingdom | The ship ran aground at Rotterdam, South Holland, Netherlands. |
| Newcastle and Arendal | Norway | The schooner ran aground at "Savnevaag". She was on a voyage from Newcastle upon Tyne, Northumberland, United Kingdom to Arendal. She was refloated and taken in to Arendal in a leaky condition. Subsequently placed under repair. |
| Prince Alfred | United Kingdom | The barque was destroyed by fire at sea. Her crew were rescued by the barque Bussorah (France). Prince Alfred was on a voyage from Hull, Yorkshire to Galle, Ceylon. |

== Unknown date ==
List of shipwrecks: Unknown date in August 1873
| Ship | State | Description |
|---|---|---|
| Albertine | United Kingdom | The schooner was wrecked at Oban, Argyllshire. |
| Annawan | United States | The whaler, a barque, capsized in the Atlantic Ocean (35°30′N 66°20′W) before 7 August with the loss of five of her 22 crew. Survivors were rescued by the barque Peerless (United Kingdom). |
| Assam Valley | United Kingdom | The ship foundered at sea. She was on a voyage from Pensacola, Florida, United States to Liverpool, Lancashire. |
| Carmen and Teresa | United Kingdom | The brigantine was driven ashore at Almería before 15 August. |
| Countess Russell | United Kingdom | The ship was driven ashore and wrecked at "Rockhampton, New Zealand". Her crew were rescued. |
| County of Nairn | United Kingdom | The ship caught fire in the Java Sea and was beached on Pangkapoint, Java, Netherlands East Indies, where she burnt out. Her crew were rescued. She was on a voyage from the Clyde to Surabaya, Netherlands East Indies. |
| Dunkerque | France | The barque was driven ashore at "Point Piedras". She was refloated and taken in to Buenos Aires, Argentine in a leaky condition. |
| Ella Maria | Canada | The ship foundered at sea. She was on a voyage from Port Caledonia, Nova Scotia to Havana, Cuba. |
| Felicie | United Kingdom | The ship was wrecked at Grand-Popo, Dahomey. She was on a voyage from Whydah, Dahomey to Marseille, Bouches-du-Rhône. |
| Fille de l'Air | United Kingdom | The barque was abandoned in the Atlantic Ocean. She was on a voyage from Charleston, South Carolina, United States to London. |
| Formosa | United Kingdom | The ship was abandoned at sea. Her crew were rescued. She was on a voyage from Quebec City, Canada to London. |
| Gloriana | United Kingdom | The ship foundered off St. Peter's, Nova Scotia, Canada. She was on a voyage from London to Saint John's, Newfoundland Colony. |
| Joseph Wilson | United Kingdom | The ship foundered at sea. She was on a voyage from London to Saint John, New Brunswick. |
| Lake Ontario | United Kingdom | The ship was driven ashore in Lake Saint Pierre. She was on a voyage from Liverpool to Montreal, Quebec, Canada. |
| Landbouw | Netherlands | The ship ran aground at Buenos Aires, Argentina before 28 August. She was refloated. |
| Magdala | United Kingdom | The brigantine was driven ashore in Morecambe Bay. She was on a voyage from Barrow in Furness, Lancashire to Sydney, Nova Scotia, Canada. |
| Margaret Knight | United Kingdom | The ship was severely damaged by fire at La Libertad before 4 August. |
| Mary | Norway | The barque was wrecked at Santo Domingo Tonalá, Mexico. Her crew were rescued. She was on a voyage from Tabasco to Santo Domingo Tonalá. |
| Minmanneth | United States | The ship was driven ashore and severely damaged near Nantucket, Massachusetts. She was on a voyage from Rio de Janeiro, Brazil to Boston, Massachusetts. She was refloated and towed in to Boston in a severely leaky condition. |
| Miramichi | Canada | The steamship struck a sunken rock and was beached on Green Island, in the Tusket Islands, Nova Scotia. She was on a voyage from Pictou, Nova Scotia to Quebec City. She was refloated in September and taken in to Quebec City for repairs. |
| Mystic | United Kingdom | The ship was lost before 15 August whilst bound for Paysandú, Uruguay. Her crew were rescued. |
| Norden | Germany | The ship was driven ashore on Moschny Island, Russia. She was on a voyage from Kronstadt, Russia to Stettin. |
| Norma | United Kingdom | The barque was driven ashore near "Mires". She was on a voyage from Newport, Monmouthshire to Syros, Greece. |
| Oregon | Canada | The ship was wrecked in the Strait of Belle Isle before 13 August. |
| Pert | United Kingdom | The steamship was driven ashore at Dalbeattie, Kirkcudbrightshire. She was refloated and taken in to Liverpool for repairs, arriving on 6 August. |
| Precursor | United Kingdom | The steamship ran aground in Lake Saint Pierre. She was on a voyage from West Hartlepool, County Durham to Quebec City. She was later refloated and completed her voyage. |
| Queen of the Belgians | Belgium | The ship ran aground at "Galzon", Uruguay. She was on a voyage from Antwerp to Paysandú, Uruguay. |
| Rivola | Flag unknown | The ship was wrecked at "Anbasque". She was on a voyage from Barbados to Quebec City. |
| Robert and Mary | United Kingdom | The schooner was run into by a steamship and sank in the River Thames. All on board survived. She was on a voyage from Great Yarmouth, Norfolk to London. |
| Russia | United States | The steamship ran aground in the Detroit River near Amherstburg, Ontario, Canada. She was repaired and returned to service. |
| Ruth | United Kingdom | The brig was driven ashore at Løkken-Vrå, Denmark. She was on a voyage from Pernambuco, Brazil to Stockhokm, Sweden. |
| Scotia | United Kingdom | The ship was driven ashore and wrecked at Saint-Pierre, Saint Pierre and Miquelon before 6 August. She was on a voyage from Quebec City to Liverpool, Lancashire. |
| South | United Kingdom | The steamship was driven ashore and wrecked at "Arzilla" before 14 August. She was on a voyage from Liverpool to Larache, Morocco. |
| St. Vincent | Newfoundland Newfoundland Colony | The ship was driven ashore. She was on a voyage from Saint John's to Valencia, Spain. She was refloated and taken in to Port La Tour, Nova Scotia. |
| Sveridge | Sweden | The steamship was driven ashore at "Fahlund". She was refloated on 9 August with the assistance of a steamship. |
| Times | United States | The ship ran aground on the Karteelhoek Bank, in the North Sea off the Belgian Coast. She was on a voyage from San Francisco, California to Antwerp. She was refloated. |
| Tinnevelly | United Kingdom | The barque was driven ashore and wrecked in a cyclone at Mayotte before 7 August. Her crew survived. She was on a voyage from South Shields, County Durham to Galle, Ceylon. |
| Zanoni | United Kingdom | The ship was driven ashore at New Glasgow, Nova Scotia. She was on a voyage from Liverpool to Charlottetown, Prince Edward Island, Canada. |
| Many unnamed vessels | United States | More the 100 canal boats and schooners were sunk in the Delaware and Chesapeake Canal at Saint George's, Delaware on or before 22 August. Twelve people were reported missing. |
