= Pituamkek National Park Reserve =

Canadian national park reserve

Coordinates: 46°39′45″N 63°52′57″W

Pituamkek National Park Reserve (also Hog Island Sandhills) is a Canadian national park reserve encompassing a chain of barrier islands along the northern coast of Prince Edward Island. The park reserve was formally established on July 4, 2024, with a proposed protected area of approximately 30 km^{2} (12 sq mi), although the boundaries of the park reserve are not yet finalized.

== Natural area ==
The national park reserve includes a 50-kilometre (31 mi) chain of barrier islands stretching from the Cascumpec Sand Hills in the northwest to the Malpeque Sand Hills in the southeast, with Conway Sand Hills in between. The area also includes Oulton's Island near Alberton, Hog Island near the Lennox Island First Nation, and several small islands in Malpeque Bay including Bird, Ram, and Courtin Islands, and also includes a strip of land along the Prince Edward Island shore. The estimated area of the park reserve is 30 square kilometres (12 sq mi); the boundaries of the protected area have not been finalized.

The barrier islands separate Cascumpec and Malpeque Bays from the Gulf of St. Lawrence, and protect the main shore from severe weather events. Both bays are designated Important Bird Areas which include the respective sand hills and some of the islands. The sand dunes provide habitat and nesting ground for several threatened species including the piping plover and little brown bat. Situated within the chain is Iron Rock, an unusual igneous rock formation and the only volcanic incursion in the province.

== Background ==
The barrier islands are known in Mi'kmaq as pituamkek ("at the long sand dune"). The land has been inhabited and used as traditional hunting and fishing grounds by Indigenous peoples from the Woodlands period through to post-European contact, with archaeological sites dated to 4,000 years old.

The Canadian government purchased Hog Island in 1942 to be added to the nearby Lennox Island First Nation, however the purchased land was never designated a reserve. Lennox Island submitted a Specific Land Claim over Hog Island to Canada on December 3, 1996.

In 2006, representatives from the Lennox Island and Abegweit First Nations and the Canadian Museum of Civilization surveyed the islands. This survey identified several sites of archaeological interest, including a shell midden site dating to 2,300 YBP. Known as pitawelkek ("where tea is made"), evidence suggests it was used seasonally for fishing, shellfish harvesting, and for hunting seal and walrus, as well as for tool-making and pottery.

In 2009, the Mi'kmaq band governments of Prince Edward Island began lobbying the provincial and federal governments for protection of the land. Over the next several years the three governments worked towards a formal system of protection, while the Nature Conservancy of Canada and the Island Nature Trust began purchasing land on Cascumpec and Conway Sand Hills. A feasibility assessment for a new national park reserve was announced on August 14, 2019.

The 2024-25 Canadian federal budget, released on April 16, 2024, committed CA$71.9 million over twelve years to establish a national park reserve at Pituamkek, plus an additional CA$7.5 million annually for operations. The park reserve was formally established through the signing of a co-management agreement between the Mi'kmaq of Prince Edward Island and Parks Canada on July 4, 2024.
