= Hog Island (Prince Edward Island) =

Barrier island along the northern coast of Prince Edward Island, Canada

Native name: Pitaweikek
- Location within Prince Edward Island

Geography
- Location: Gulf of Saint Lawrence and Malpeque Bay
- Coordinates: 46°36′50″N 63°47′42″W
- Length: 14.5 km (9.01 mi)

Administration
- Canada
- Province: Prince Edward Island
- County: Prince County

Hog Island (Mi'kmaq: Pitaweikek, literally "tea broth place") is a 14.5 km (9.0 mi) long barrier island located off the northwest coast of Prince Edward Island in Canada. The island is notable for its unique sandhill ecosystem and cultural significance to the Mi'kmaq people.

== Geography ==
Hog Island is the largest and southernmost island of a series of barrier islands that separate Malpeque Bay to the southwest from the larger Gulf of Saint Lawrence, to the northeast. It borders Lennox and Bird Islands to the west, and the Conway Sandhills to the northwest.

== Wildlife ==
The Hog Island Sandhills are home to many endangered species including the piping plover, the gypsy's cuckoo bumblebee, the northern long-eared bat and the little brown bat.

== Preservation ==
The island is included within the boundaries of Pituamkek National Park Reserve, a national park reserve first proposed by the Mi'kmaq First Nations in 2005. In 2019, Parks Canada began a feasibility assessment on the establishment of a national park reserve, and the park reserve was formally established in 2024, although the exact boundaries have not yet been finalized.

The island is also included within an Important Bird Area encompassing the waters and shoreline of Malpeque Bay.

== See also ==
- Cascumpec Bay
- Lennox Island
