= Green Park Provincial Park =

Provincial park in Prince Edward Island, Canada

Coordinates: 46°34′33.5″N 63°57′55.2″W

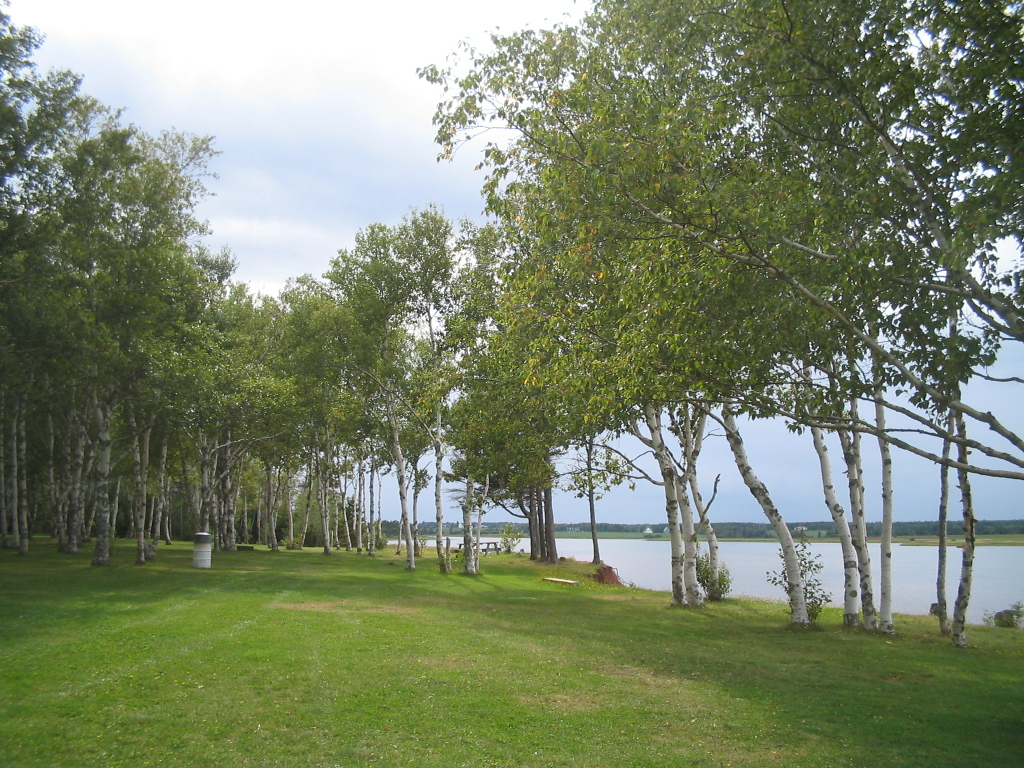
Near the banks of the river at Green Park Provincial Park

Green Park Provincial Park is a provincial park in Prince Edward Island, Canada. It is located on the western shore of Malpeque Bay. It is the site of a former shipyard; in the 19th century, ship building was a major industry on Prince Edward Island. The province acquired the land in the 1960s. It is home to the Green Park Shipbuilding Museum and Yeo House, the historic home of a shipping magnate.
