= National parks of Canada =

Parks owned and maintained by the federal government of Canada

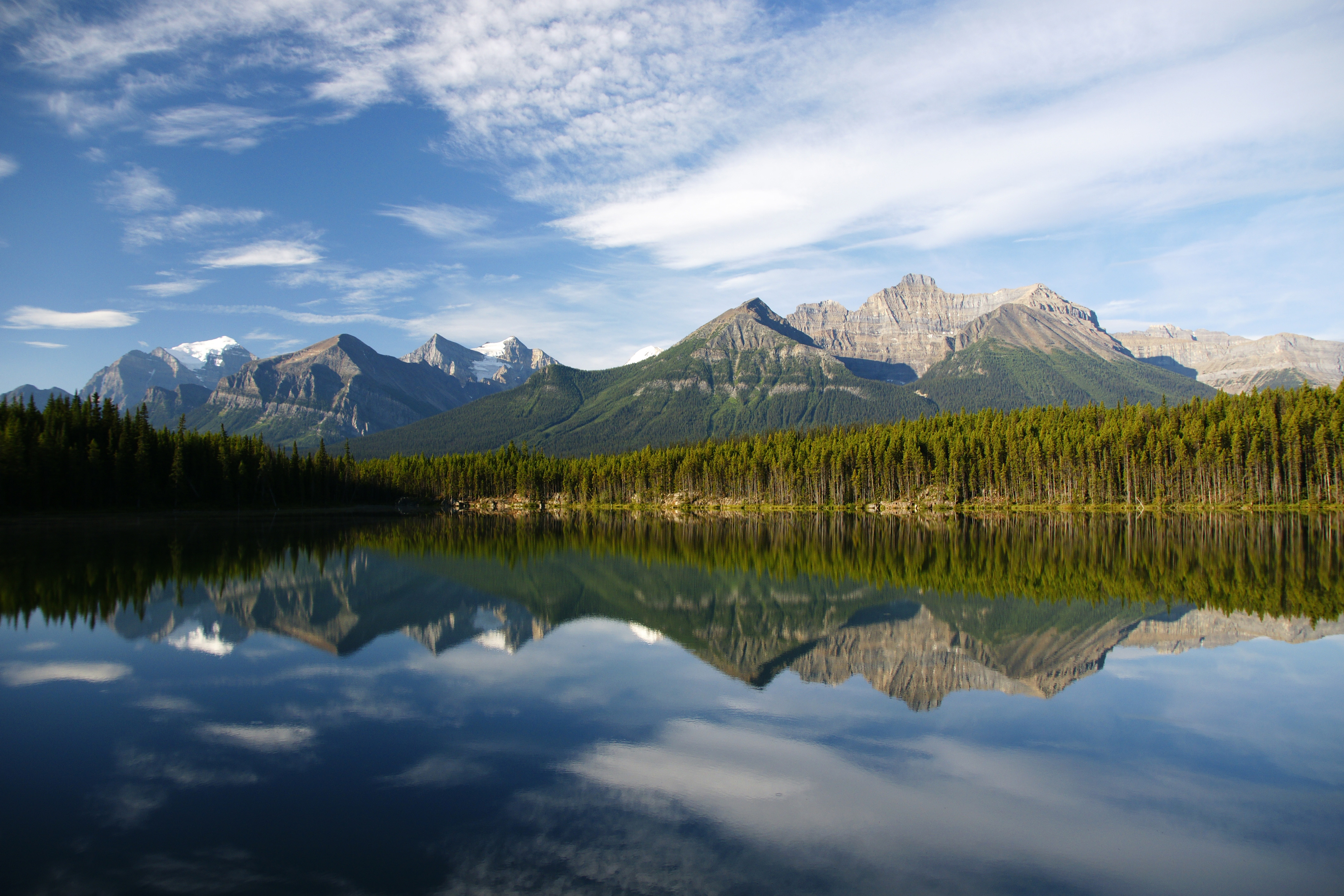
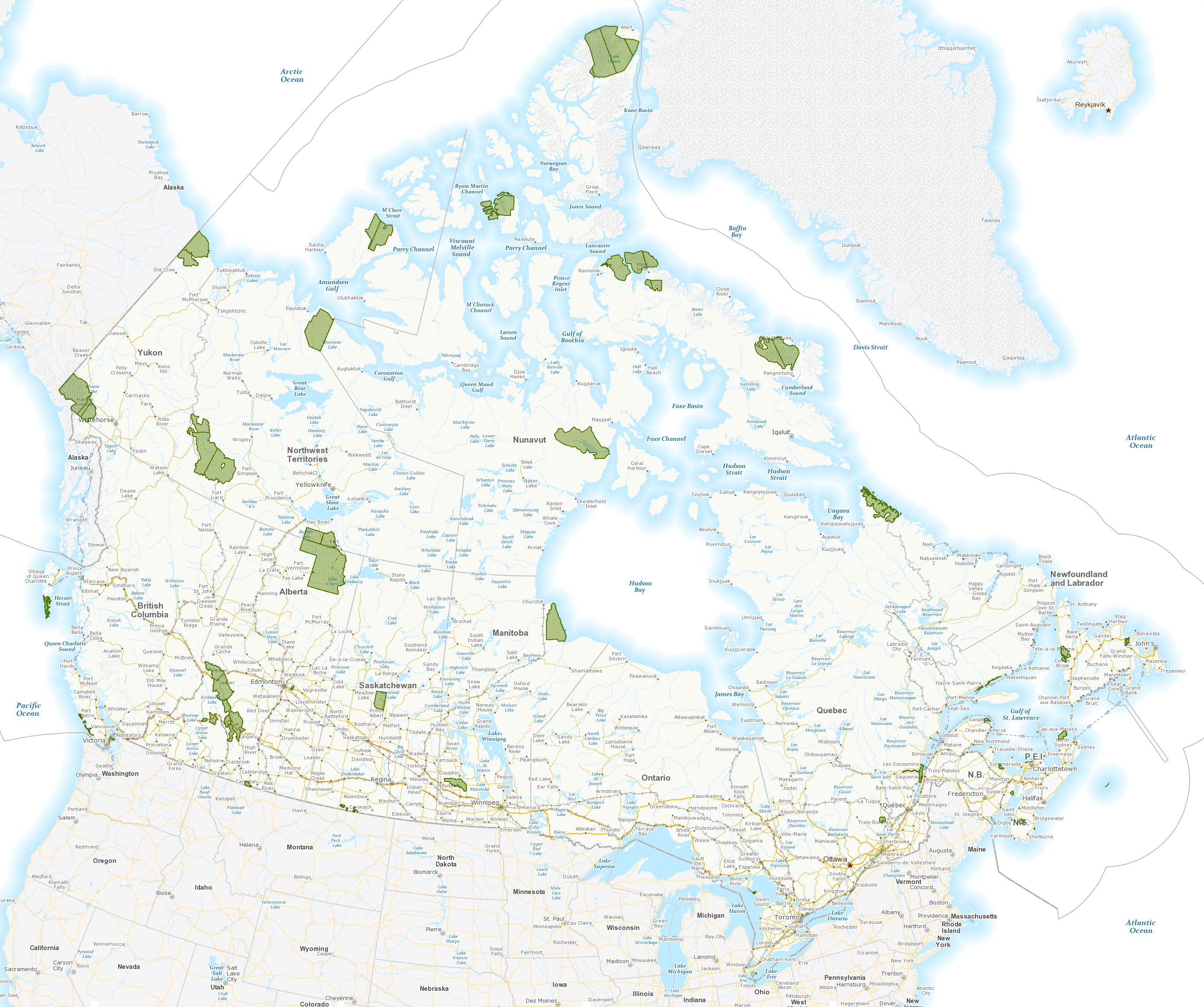
National parks of Canada; Parcs Nationaux du Canada (French)
Herbert Lake in Banff National Park, Alberta
First park	Banff National Park, 1885
Smallest park	Georgian Bay Islands National Park, 13.5 km^{2}
Largest park	Wood Buffalo National Park, 44,807 km^{2}
Governing body	Parks Canada
Distribution and location of national parks in Canada

In Canada, national parks are maintained by Parks Canada, a government agency. The areas that fall within Parks Canada's governance include a wide range of protected areas, encompassing National Historic Sites, National Marine Conservation Areas (NMCA), and National Park Reserves. Canada established its first national park in Banff in 1885, and has since expanded its national park system to include 37 national parks and 11 national park reserves.

== Early history ==
Canada's first national park, located in Banff, was established in 1885. Tourism and commercialization dominated early park development, followed closely by resource extraction. Commodifying the parks to profit Canada's national economy as well as conserving the natural areas for public and future use became an integrated method of park creation. The process of establishing national parks has often forced the displacement of Indigenous and non-Indigenous residents of areas within the proposed park boundaries. Conflicts between the creation of parks and the residents of the area have been negotiated through co-management practices, as Parks Canada acknowledged the importance of community involvement in order to sustain a healthy ecosystem.

The transition towards developing parks as a place of preservation began with the National Parks Act of 1930. This event marked a shift in park management practices. Revised in 1979 under the National Parks Policy, the Act placed greater emphasis on preserving the natural areas in an unimpaired state through ecological integrity and restoration, moving away from development based heavily on profit. Acting as national symbols, Canada's national parks exist in every province and territory representing a variety of landscapes that mark Canada's natural heritage.

== Timeline ==
- 1885 – Banff National Park is established as the first national park in Canada. Originally this park was called Banff Hot Springs Reserve and later the Rocky Mountains National Park.
- 1908–1912 – Four national parks are established in Alberta and Saskatchewan with a mission akin to national wildlife refuges. All would be abolished by 1947 once their goals were achieved.
- 1911 – Dominion Parks Branch creates the world's first national park service. This branch was overseen by the Department of the Interior, which is now known as Parks Canada, the governing body of Canada's national parks.
- 1930 – Canada's parliament passes the first National Parks Act, regulating protection of the parks.
- 1930 – Transfer of Resources agreement is signed.
- 1964 – First National Parks Policy is implemented.
- 1970s – National Parks System Plan is devised with an aim to protect a representative sample of each of Canada's 39 natural spaces.
- 1979 – National Parks policy is revised to make preserving ecological integrity the priority in Canadian Parks, ending the so-called dual-mandate with recreational uses.
- 1984 – First national park is established through a land claim agreement.
- 1988 – National Parks Act is amended, formalizing the principle of ecological integrity in the park system.
- 1989 – The Endangered Spaces campaign is launched by the Canadian Parks and Wilderness Society and World Wildlife Canada to encourage the completion of the national parks system. The goal of the campaign is to have parks and protected areas that represent each of the country's natural regions.
- 1998 – The Parks Canada Agency Act is implemented.
- 2011 – To mark the 100th anniversary of the creation of the national parks system, Parks Canada, Primitive Entertainment and Discovery World HD commissioned the National Parks Project to create a series of documentary films about various parks in the system.
- 2017 – Free admission for the whole year - In celebration of Canada's 150th birthday on July 1, 2017, Parks Canada offers free admission to national parks and national historic sites for the entire year.
- 2019 – Thaidene Nëné National Park Reserve is established.
- 2024 - Pituamkek National Park Reserve is established, and is Canada's newest national park.

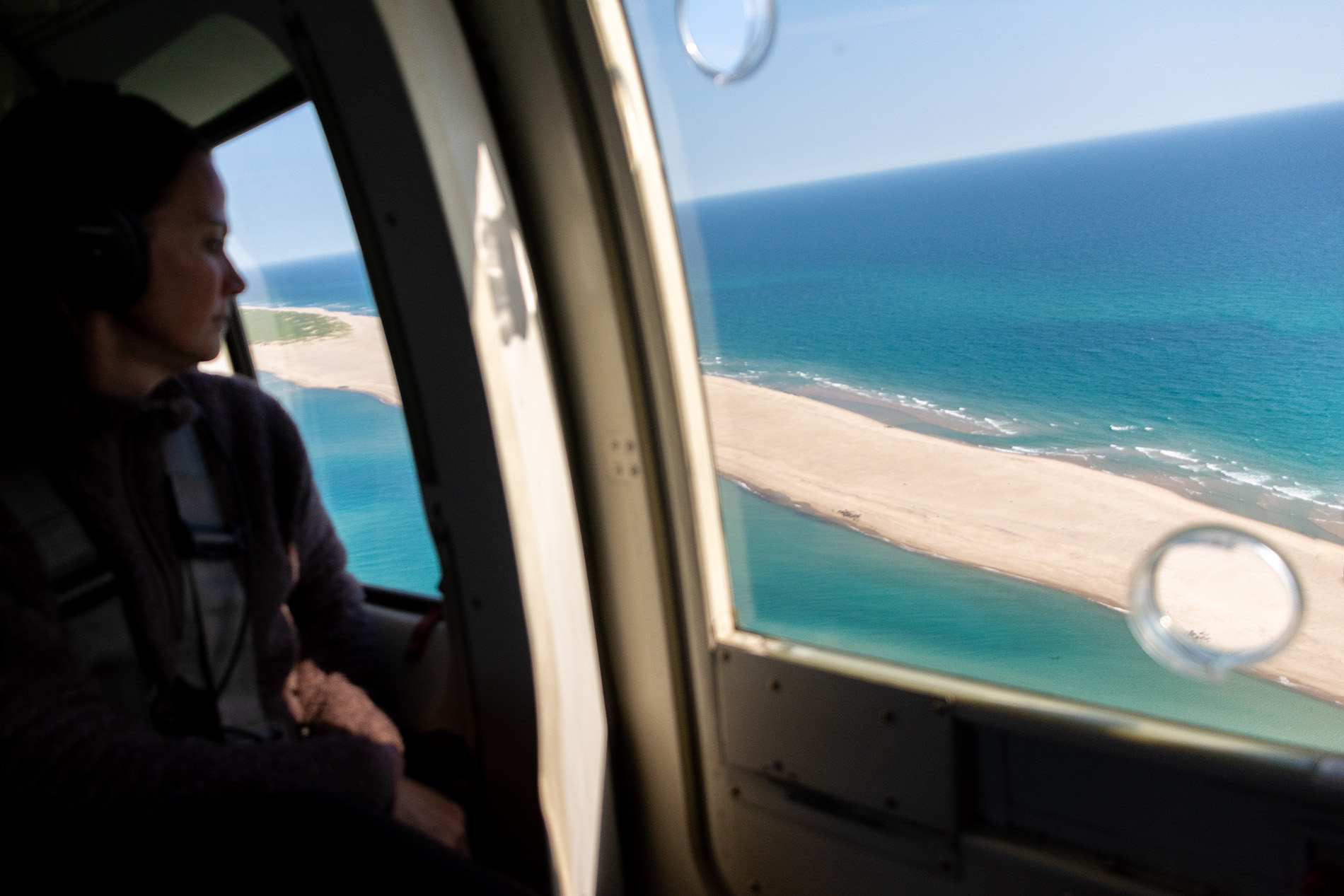
A visitor views an area of Sable Island National Park Reserve from a helicopter.

== Creation and development ==
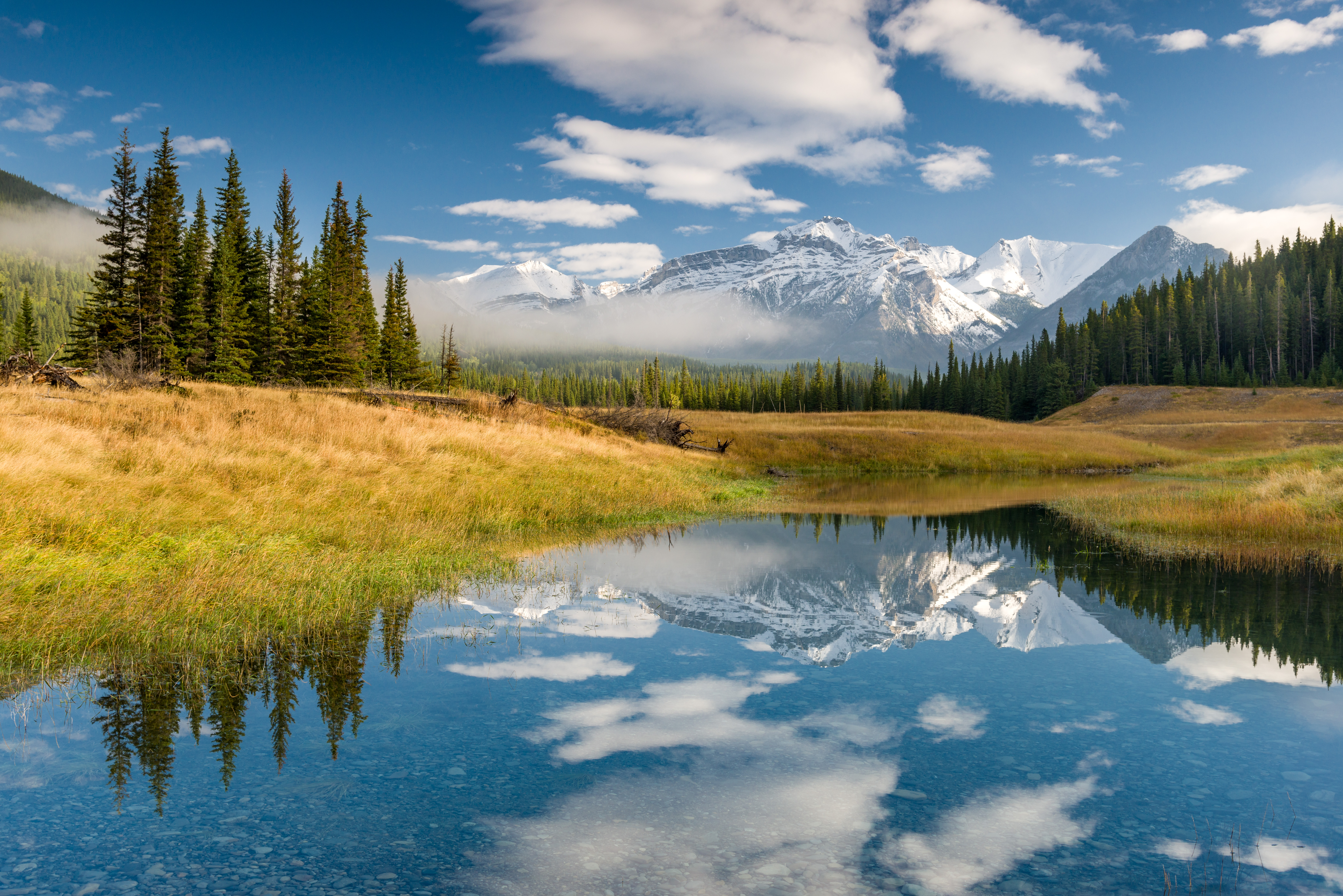
A view of the Rockies from Banff National Park.

On July 20, 1871, the Crown Colony of British Columbia committed to Confederation with Canada. Under the union's terms, Canada was to begin construction of a transcontinental railway to connect the Pacific Coast to the eastern provinces. As the Canadian Pacific Railway surveyors began to study the land in 1875, the location of the country's natural resources sprouted further interest. Evidence of minerals quickly introduced the construction of mines and resource exploitation in Canada's previously untouched wilderness. Exploration led to the discovery of hot springs near Banff, Alberta, and in November 1885, the Canadian Government made the springs public property, protecting them from possible private ownership and exploitation. This event brought about the beginning of Canada's movement towards preserving land and setting it aside for public usage as national parks. By the late 1880s, Thomas White, Canada's Minister of the Interior, responsible for federal land management, Indian affairs, and natural resources extraction, began establishing a legislative motion towards establishing Canada's first national park in Banff.

May 1911 marked one of the most significant events in the administration and development of national parks in Canada as the Dominion Forest Reserves and Parks Act received royal assent. This law saw the creation of the first administrative body, the Dominion Parks Branch, now known as Parks Canada, to administer national parks in Canada. With the Branch in place, the parks system expanded from Banff eastward, combining both use and protection as the foundation to national park management.

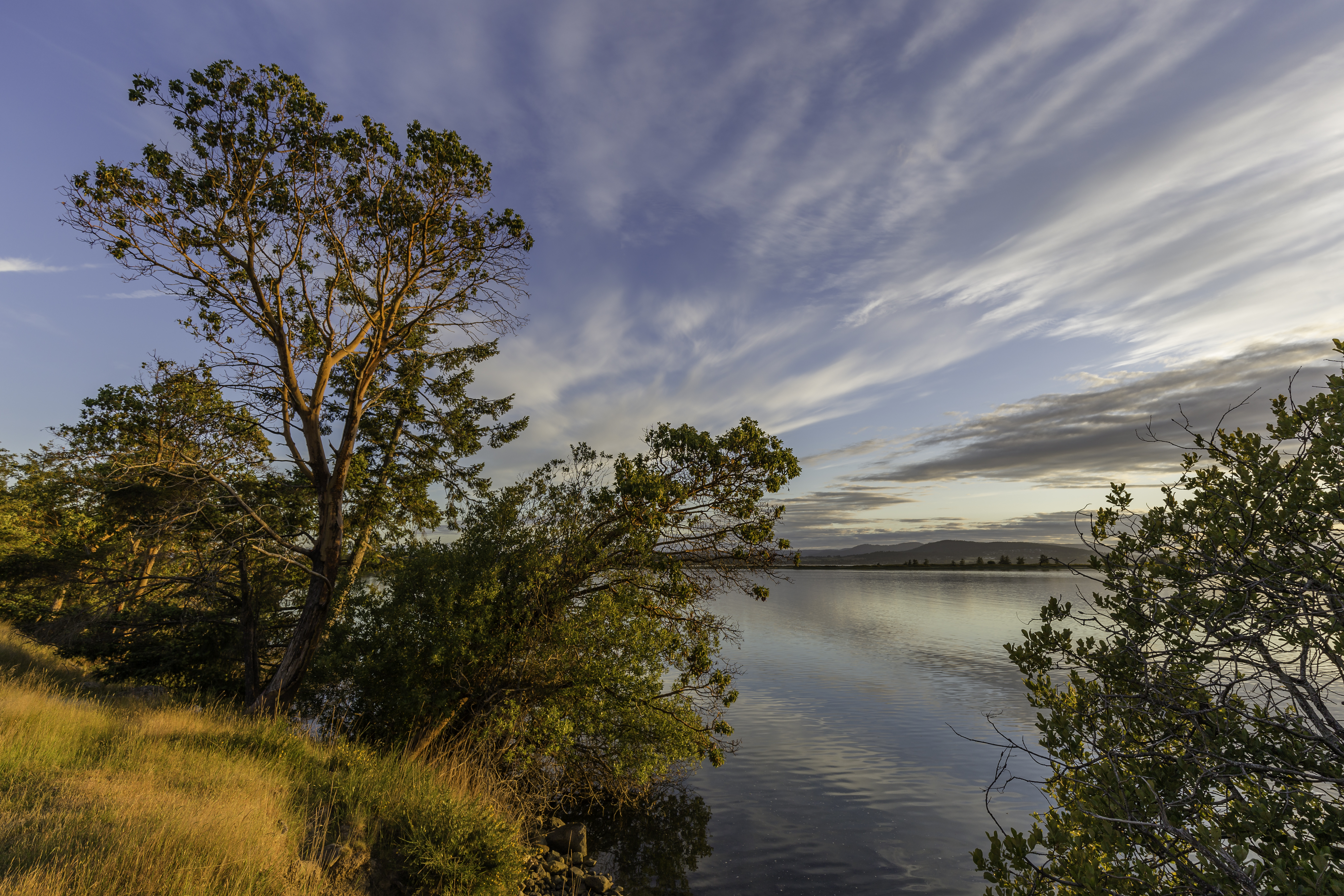
Arbutus trees at sunset on Sidney Island in Gulf Islands National Park Reserve.

The major motives behind the creation of national parks in Canada were profit and preservation. Inspired by the establishment and success of Yellowstone National Park in the United States, Canada blended the conflicting ideas of preservation and commercialism in order to satisfy its natural resource needs, conservationist views of modern management, a growing public interest in the outdoors and the new popularity of getting back to nature. This growing interest to escape the hustle and bustle of the city brought about ideas of conserving Canada's unspoiled wildernesses by creating public parks. As a country dependent on natural resources, Canada's national parks represent a compromise between the demand for profit from the land's resources and tourism and the need for preservation and sustainable development.

While conservationist ideas and a Canadian desire towards getting back to nature were evident in the early development of national parks in Canada, a greater role was played by chambers of commerce, local governments, promoters of tourism, and recreational groups who advocated for profit-driven commercial development, while incorporating wildlife preservation when possible. Canada's national parks allowed the public an avenue into nature, while also integrating ideas of preserving Canada's scenic landscape and wildlife populations in an era of development and major resource extraction.

=== Tourism and commercialization ===
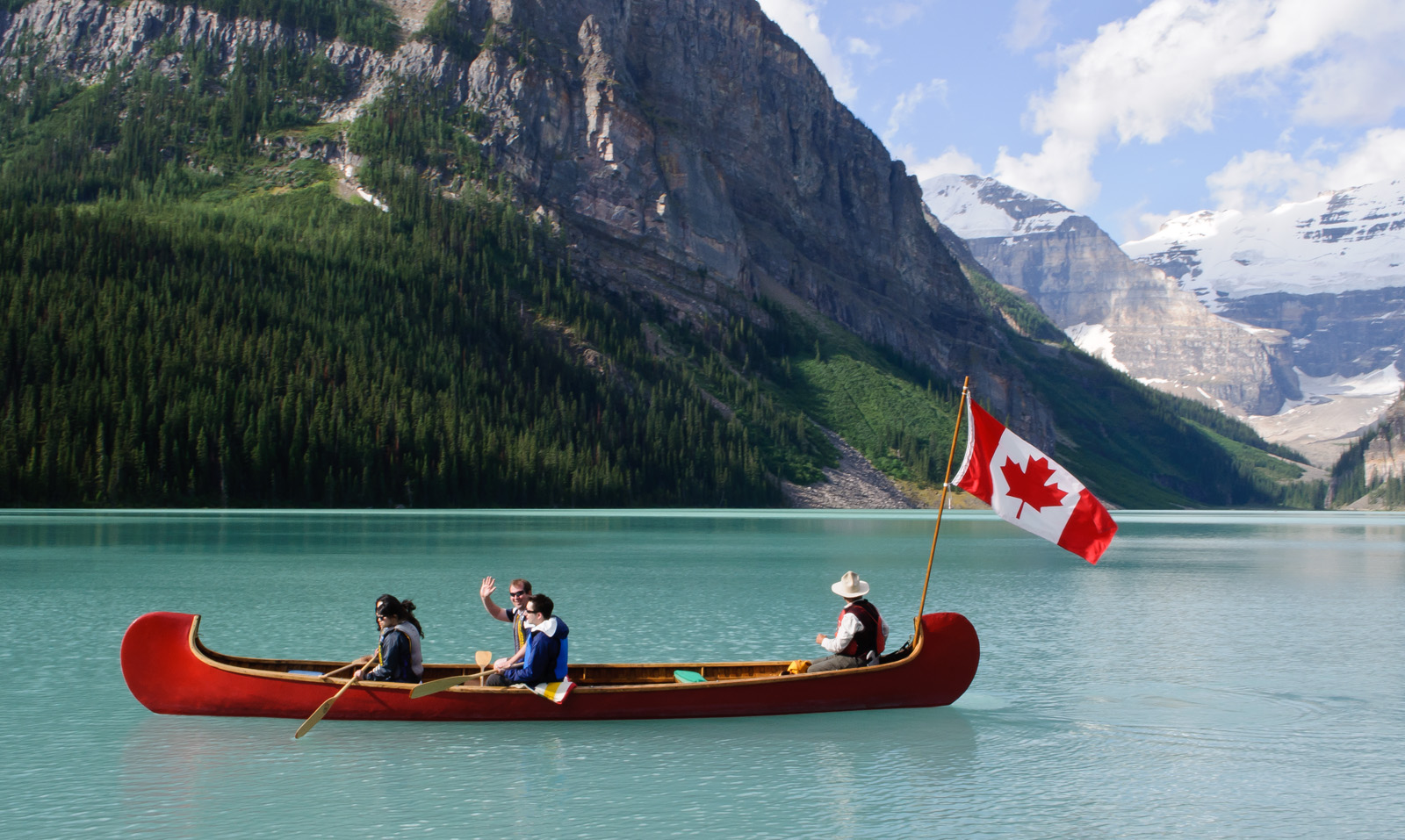
Lake Louise, Banff National Park

The integration of public visitation for national parks in Canada heavily contributed to the beginnings of public constituencies for certain parks. The parks that mobilized with a public constituency tended to prosper at a faster rate. As a tactic to increase the number of people travelling to and through national parks, members of each constituency surrounding national parks began to advocate for the construction of well-built roads, including the development of the Trans-Canada Highway. As the main highway travelling through the Canadian Rockies, the Trans-Canada Highway has provided accessible visitation and commerce to the area. The highway is designed to provide a heavy flow of traffic, while also including many accessible pull-offs and picnic areas. With a high frequency of travelers and many destinations to stop, tourism boomed after the Trans-Canada Highway was established. As the highway travels through Banff and the Bow Valley area, it includes scenic views of most of the mountains, and an environment rich with wildlife.

With an increase in tourism to Rocky Mountain Park, growth and prosperity came to the town of Banff. The Banff hot springs were made more accessible after a tunnel was blasted in 1886. Horse-drawn carriages were replaced by buses and taxis, and by the 1960s small cabins had been largely replaced by hotels and motels as the community became geared towards building the national park as a tourist destination. In 1964, the first visitor service centre was established at Lake Louise Station, which included the development of a campground, trailer park, and other attractions. Cave and Basin Springs were forced to rebuild their bathing pools in 1904 and then again in 1912, because of growing public interest in the hot springs. By 1927, campground accommodations at Tunnel Mountain were adapting to include room for trailers as well as tents. Due to increased demand, the campground was extended, and by 1969 it was the biggest campground in the national park system. Banff became a year-round recreational centre as the growth of winter sport activities provided added incentive for tourism. The implementation of T-bars and chairlifts on Banff's ski hills helped develop Banff into a ski and winter sports destination.

== Conflicts over creation ==
=== Resource development ===
Since the inception of Canada's national parks, business and profit has been a major element to their creation and development. Although tourism was the first source of profit in the national parks, the exploitation of natural resources such as coal, lumber, and other minerals became another major area of revenue. These resources were found in abundance in the Rocky Mountains and were interpreted as being inexhaustible.

Coal was the most plentiful and profitable of all the minerals and therefore its mining in parks was accepted by politicians and Canadian Pacific Railway officials. This was demonstrated by the creation of Bankhead, a coal town on the road to Lake Minnewanka. This coal town was not viewed as a detriment to the overall scenery of Banff National Park, but was instead an added attraction for visitors. In this case, resource exploitation and tourism worked in conjunction with each other to create a more profitable national park. Although tourism and resource development could work together, it was clear from policy making that tourism became secondary to resource exploitation.

The resources that were exploited from the national parks were essential to the CPR's income as it freighted these resources across the country. In 1887, the Rocky Mountains Park Act was established under the Macdonald government and it reflected the importance of resource exploitation for Canada's economy. Under this regulation, national parks were not fully preserved in their natural states as mining, logging and grazing continued to be permitted.

When the Rocky Mountains Park Bill was proposed, it elicited various criticisms at the time, one being the implicit contradiction between the exploitation of resources within this national reservation. However, the overarching nineteenth century ideology that lumbering and mining would contribute to the usefulness of the reserve as opposed to depreciating the park overshadowed the concerns of resource exploitation. The natural resources within the parks were seen as being unlimited and therefore should be used as it was economically beneficial for the nation.

By 1911, as Canadians became aware of the depletion occurring within America's natural resources, a debate focused on the extent of resource exploitation in Canada's national parks erupted. This debate began as early as 1906 at the Forestry Convention in Ottawa as it stimulated a new interest in conservation which spoke to the governmental, academic, and public level. Canada's national parks were no longer places of unlimited natural resources, but were now considered a place where resources needed to be conserved through regulation to ensure future and continued use.

J.B. Harkin, the Parks Commissioner in 1911, advocated the complete eradication of coal and mineral extraction in the parks. However, Harkin's vision did not come to fruition until 1930 when the National Parks Act was established. Under this act, mineral exploration and development were banned and only limited use of timber was permitted within the parks. For Canada to continue its economic success through resource development, the boundaries of Canada's national parks were altered prior to the 1930 Act in order to exclude resource rich land from park areas. The exclusion of resource development in Canada's national parks marked a minor shift towards preservationist attitudes over Canada's parks as recreational use and development was still permitted.

=== Human conflict ===
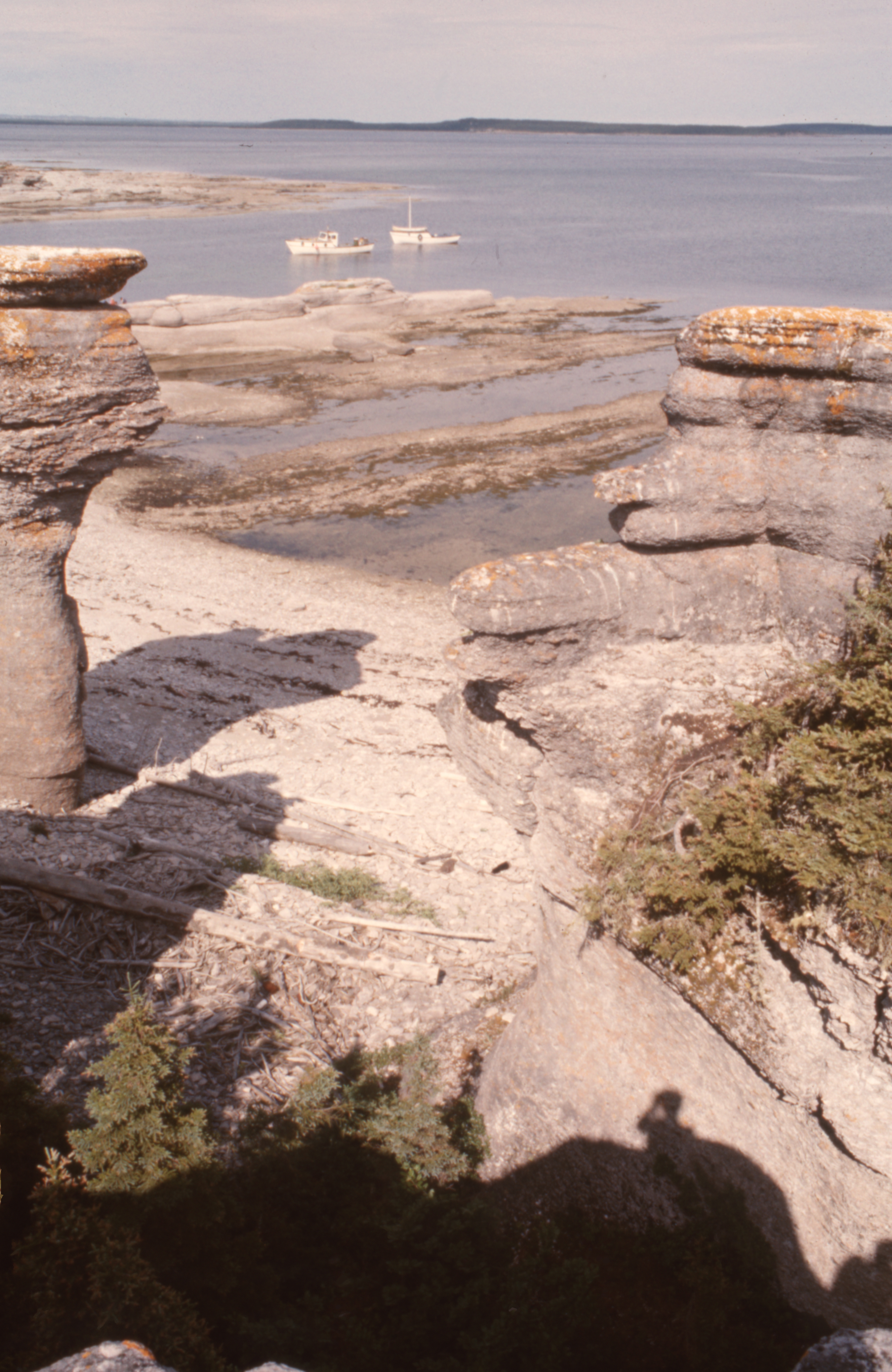
Niapiskau island, limestone monoliths, Gulf of St. Lawrence, Mingan Archipelago National Park Reserve.

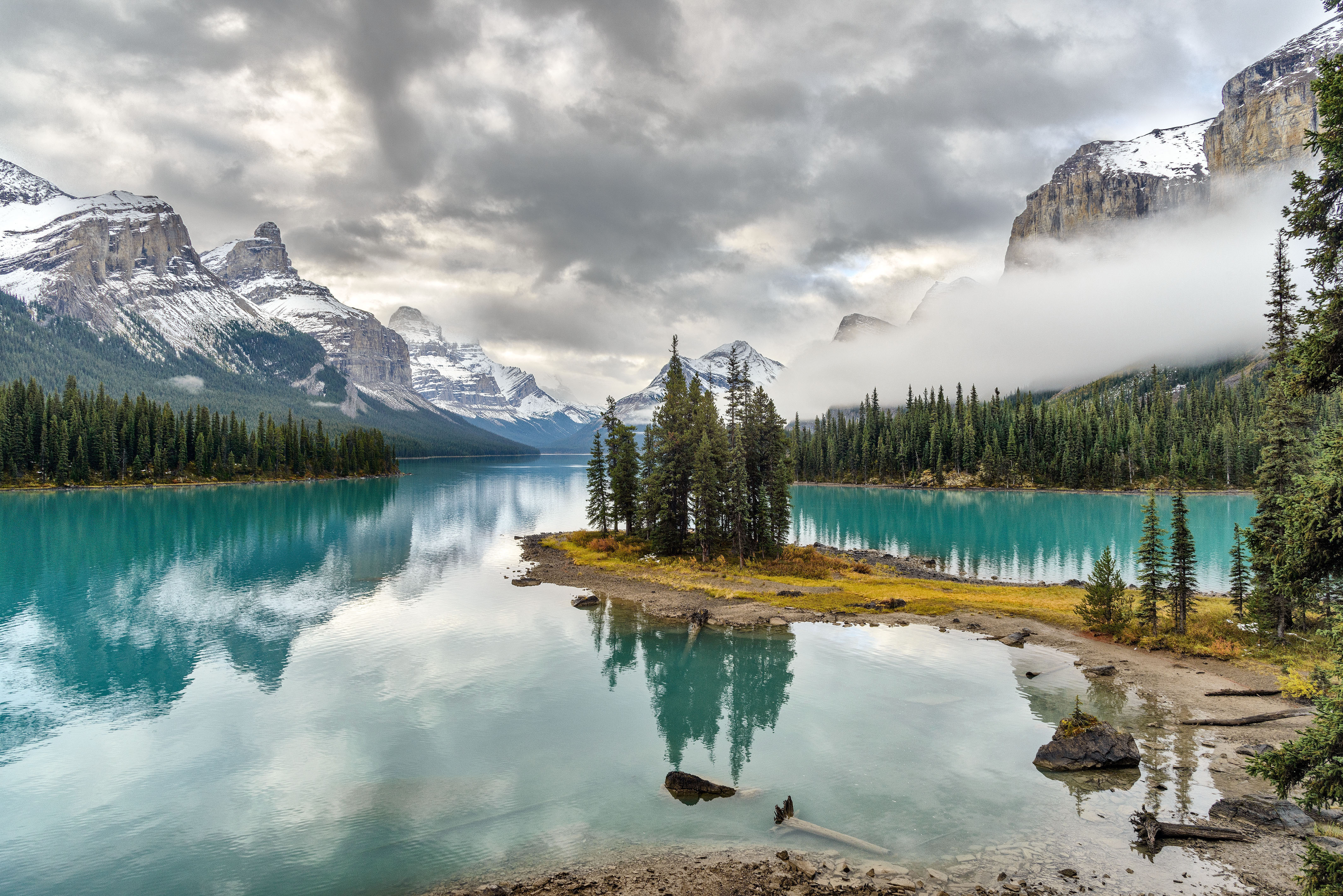
Maligne Lake in Jasper National Park.

The initial ideal of national parks was to create uninhabited wilderness. Creating this required the displacement of Indigenous and non-Indigenous residents who lived within the intended park boundaries, and restrictions on how these residents had previously used the land and resources within parks for subsistence.

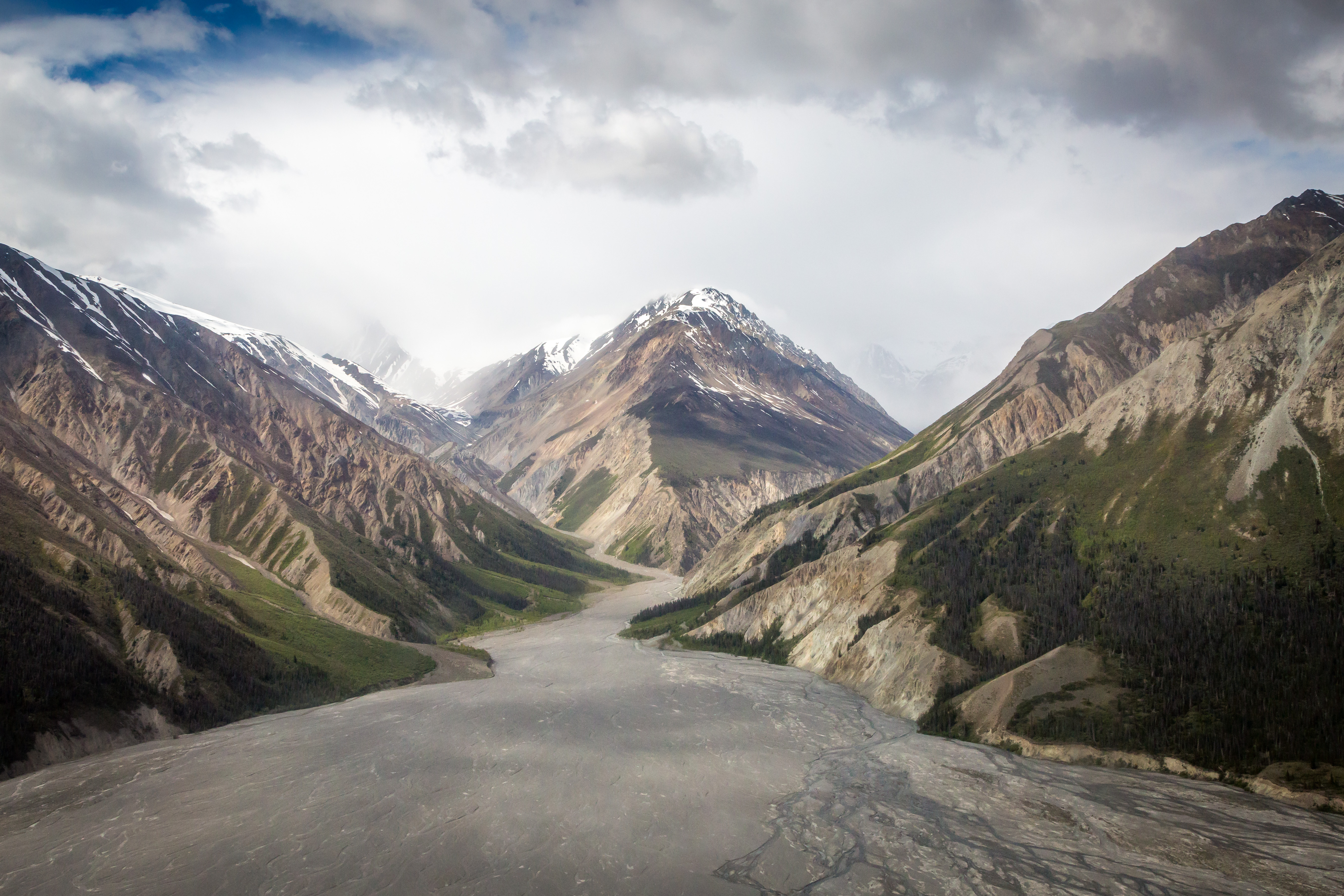
A view in Kluane National Park.

Jasper National Park, established in 1907, restricted income-generating activities such as hunting, along with culturally valuable practices of the Aboriginal groups who had used the region. Jasper is a large park in the southern, frequently visited portion of Canada, and one of many parks geared towards tourism more than preservation. Most parks are designed to have the appeal of uninhabited wilderness while also having amenities and roads to facilitate visitors. Human activity within the park was allowed, but primarily only those activities that generated revenue, such as snowboarding and lodging for tourists. Some have claimed that the selection of which activities to allow had non-native bias, as it precluded traditional sources of subsistence such as hunting and trapping.

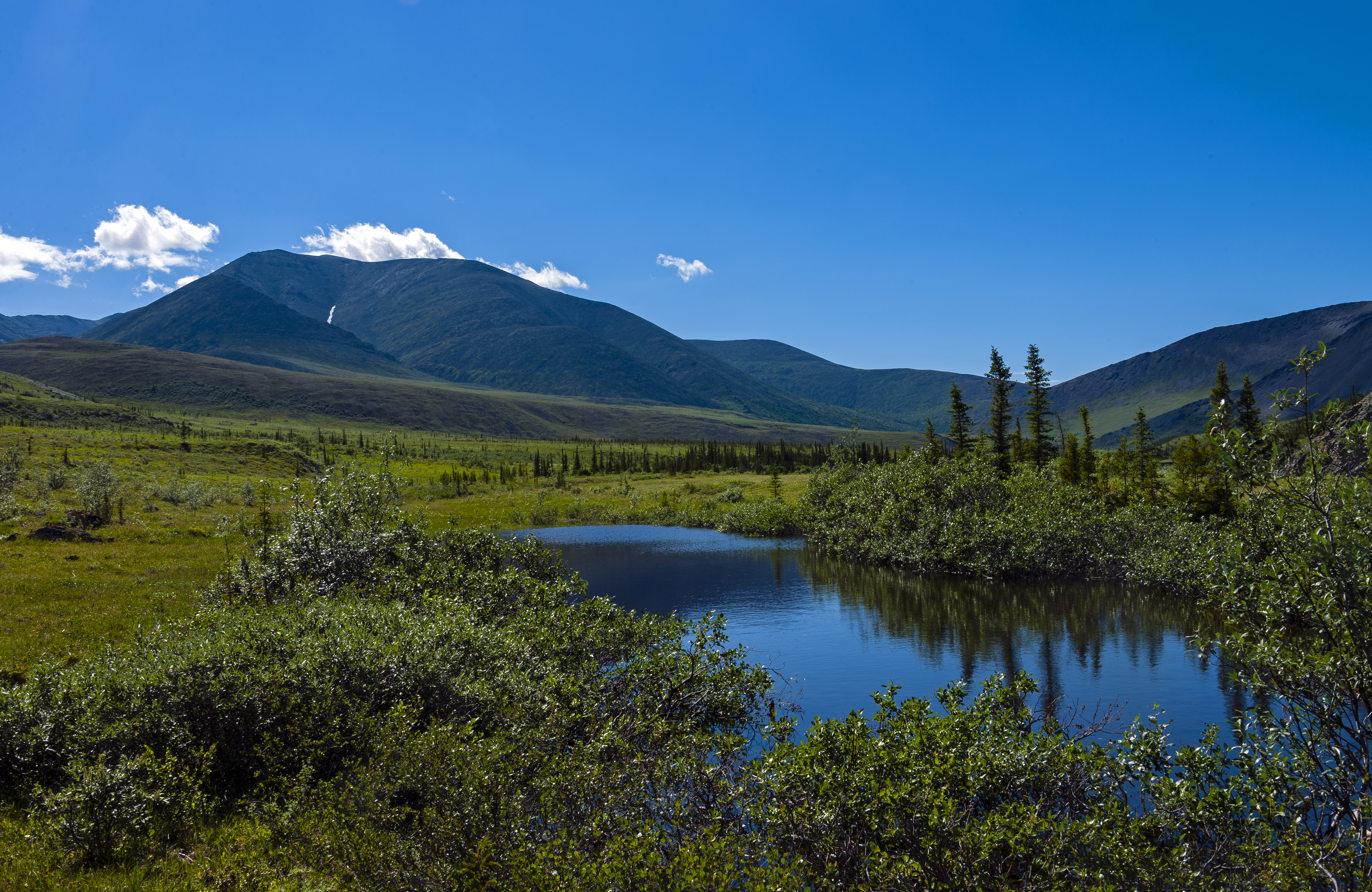
Tundra landscape and a pond near the confluence of Wolf Creek and Firth River, with mountains in the background, in Ivvavik National Park.

Parks in less frequently visited, northern parts of Canada were created with more consideration of Aboriginal usage. Kluane National Park and Reserve in the Yukon initially had restrictions on hunting in order to preserve the presence of wildlife in the park, as did Ivvavik National Park in the Northern Yukon. Through grassroots organizations and political lobbying, Indigenous residents of these areas were able to have greater influence over the process of park creation. For both Kluane and Ivvavik parks, Indigenous organizations protested and testified to Parliamentary Committees, describing how these restrictions infringed on their ability to provide for themselves through traditional fishing, hunting, and trapping. Ivvavik National Park, established in 1984, was the first in Canada to be created through a comprehensive land claim settlement, and set a precedent for collaboration and co-management in future parks. In June 1984, the Inuvialuit Final Agreement was signed, which deviated from past parks by committing to a more extensive inclusion of Aboriginal interests and gave the Inuvialuit exclusive rights to hunting and harvesting game within the park. This agreement was an example of and the beginning of co-management, which ensured that Indigenous voices would be heard and given equal representatives on parks boards.

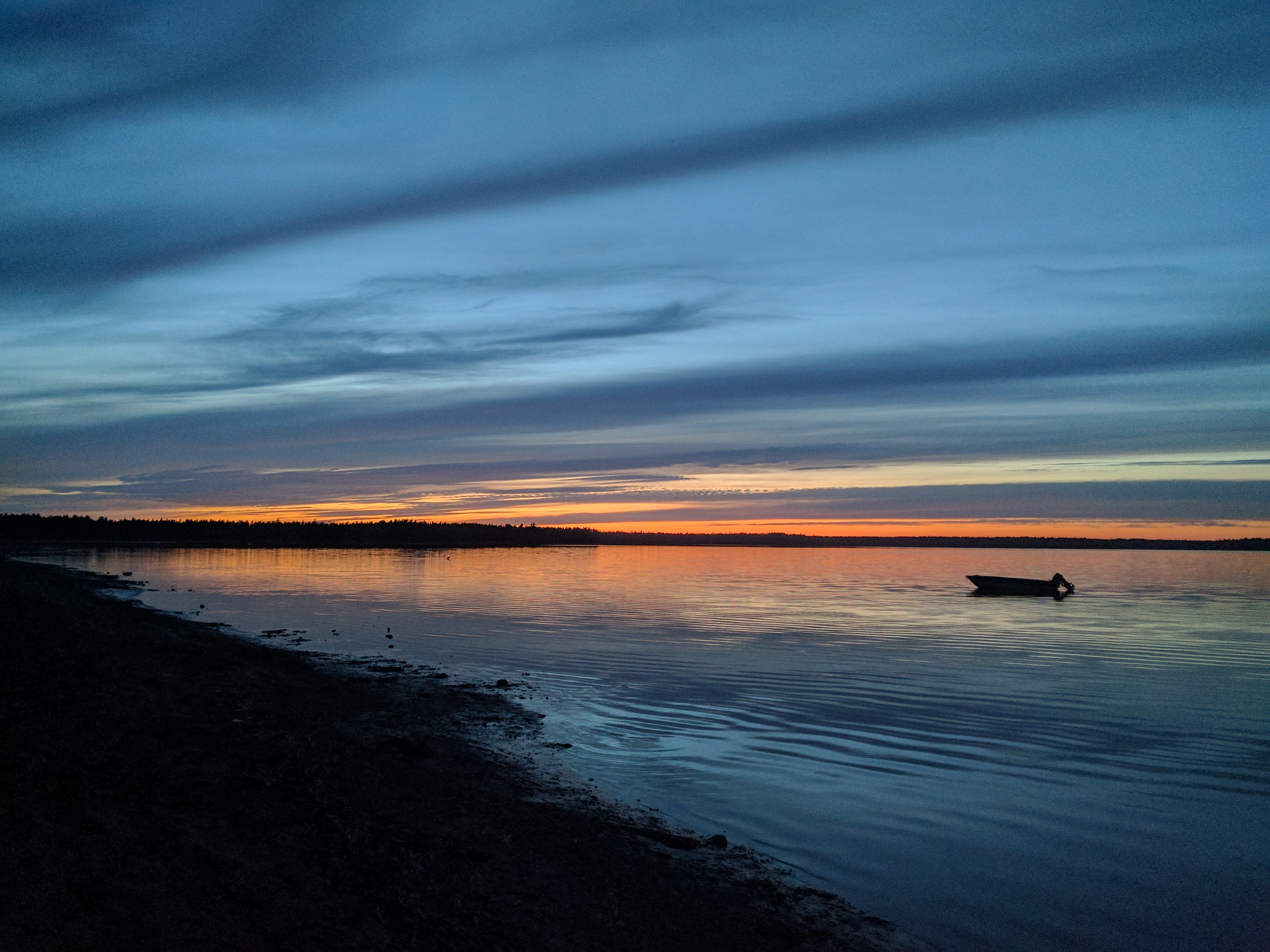
Sunset seen from a beach at Kouchibouguac National Park.

Non-Indigenous groups were also dispossessed from their land during the creation of national parks, such as the Acadians of Kouchibouguac National Park in New Brunswick. This park was created in 1969 and included recognition of the Aboriginal groups who had once resided there but no recognition of the Acadians who comprised approximately 85 percent of the over 1,500 people who were displaced to create the park. Many inhabitants dispossessed of their land by Parks Canada resisted, and the Acadian residents' resistance of eviction was extensive enough to delay the official opening of the park until 1979. Through protest and civil disobedience, they won greater compensation from the government to address the loss of fishing within the park that had previously been their main source of income. The resistance of the Acadians impacted future park creation, as in 1979 Parks Canada announced that it would no longer use forced relocation in new parks. An advisory committee was created by Parks Canada in 2008 to reflect on the Kouchibouguac process and address outstanding grievances.

== Shifting value behind park creation and management ==
=== Conservation movements ===
In the late 19th century, Canadians changed their view of nature and resources as opinions started to focus on conservationist ideas. They were transitioning from a worldview of ecology and abundance to one where the environment acted as a limited resource.

Created in 1909, the Commission of Conservation became the Canadian forum for conservation issues, acting as an advisory and consultative body used to answer questions related to conservation and better utilization of Canada's natural and human resources. The Commission focused on a concept that maximized future profits through good management in the present. Rather than preserving through non-use, the commission was concerned with managing resources for long-term gain.

Other conservation-minded organizations, like the Alpine Club, had different ideas that focused on the preservation of natural wilderness and opposed any type of development or construction. This movement was successful as the creation of parks solely for preservation purposes, like the bird sanctuary in Point Pelee, began developing. In order to push their views further, this movement, headed by James B. Harkin and Arthur Oliver Wheeler, was forced to argue that divine scenery was itself a source of profit – tourism – in order to push aside what they saw as a far greater avenue of exploitation: resource extraction. By 1930, even the conservation movements within Canada came to understand that the country's national parks had an entrenched system of profit-based motives.

The Parks Canada Agency Act came into action in 1998 to ensure the protection of parks for further generations' use and national interest as places of cultural and historical importance.

=== Ecological integrity ===
According to Parks Canada, ecological integrity is a state with three elements: non-living elements, living elements, and a series of ecological functions. By having all three elements, a healthy ecosystem exists. Ecosystems in national parks have often been damaged due to the exploitation of resources, the expansion of tourism, and external land use practices outside national parks. Through Parks Canada realizing the necessity of managing national parks by human hands to maintain biotic and abiotic components, Parks Canada placed an emphasis on ecological integrity within the national parks that marked a shift from profit to preservation.

The change in values is derived from the establishment of 1930 National Parks Act that limited use of resource for park management, and in 1979, under revised National Parks Policy, the maintenance of ecological integrity was prioritized for the preservation of national parks of Canada. In 1988, the National Parks Act was amended and the regulation of ecological integrity was embodied. However, due to the conflicting interests of profit and preservation, the maintenance of ecological integrity has progressed slowly.

The big movement on maintenance of ecological integrity has happened since 2001. Canada National Parks Act of 2001 reinforced the necessity of maintenance and restorations of ecological integrity by saving natural resources and ecosystem. It sets new principles for park management plans. Wilderness areas in the Banff, Jasper, Yoho and Kootenay National Parks have been officially designated land as wilderness in national parks. The boundaries of all communities in national parks are changed and the developments of commerce in their communities are restricted. Profit no longer became priority and initiative for preservation through ecological integrity increased.

To maintain or restore ecological integrity, ecosystem restorations are implemented in many parks, attempting to bring back damaged ecosystems to their original healthy state and making them sustainable. For example, Grasslands National Park brought back Bison bison for a prairie restoration. The bison grazing patterns help to maintain a variety of prairie biodiversity. In Gwaii Haanas National Park Reserve and Haida Heritage Site, removing Norway rats which were accidentally introduced to the area, is conducted because they eat eggs, as well as juvenile and adult seabirds, and reduce the seabird population. Staff monitor for the return of rats by trapping and poison baits for recovering native seabird populations.

=== Co-management ===
Through parks policies and operation practices, Parks Canada has recognized the importance of working together with Indigenous peoples and other communities to manage parks' healthy ecosystem within and around national parks.

In 1984, Ivvavik National Park was established as a result of an Aboriginal land claim agreement. Now, Ivvavik is managed co-operatively by Parks Canada and the Inuvialuit. Their mutual goals are to protect wild life, keep the ecosystem healthy and protect their cultural resources. In addition, they ensure the preservation of the Inuvialuit traditional way of living, including trapping, hunting and fishing.

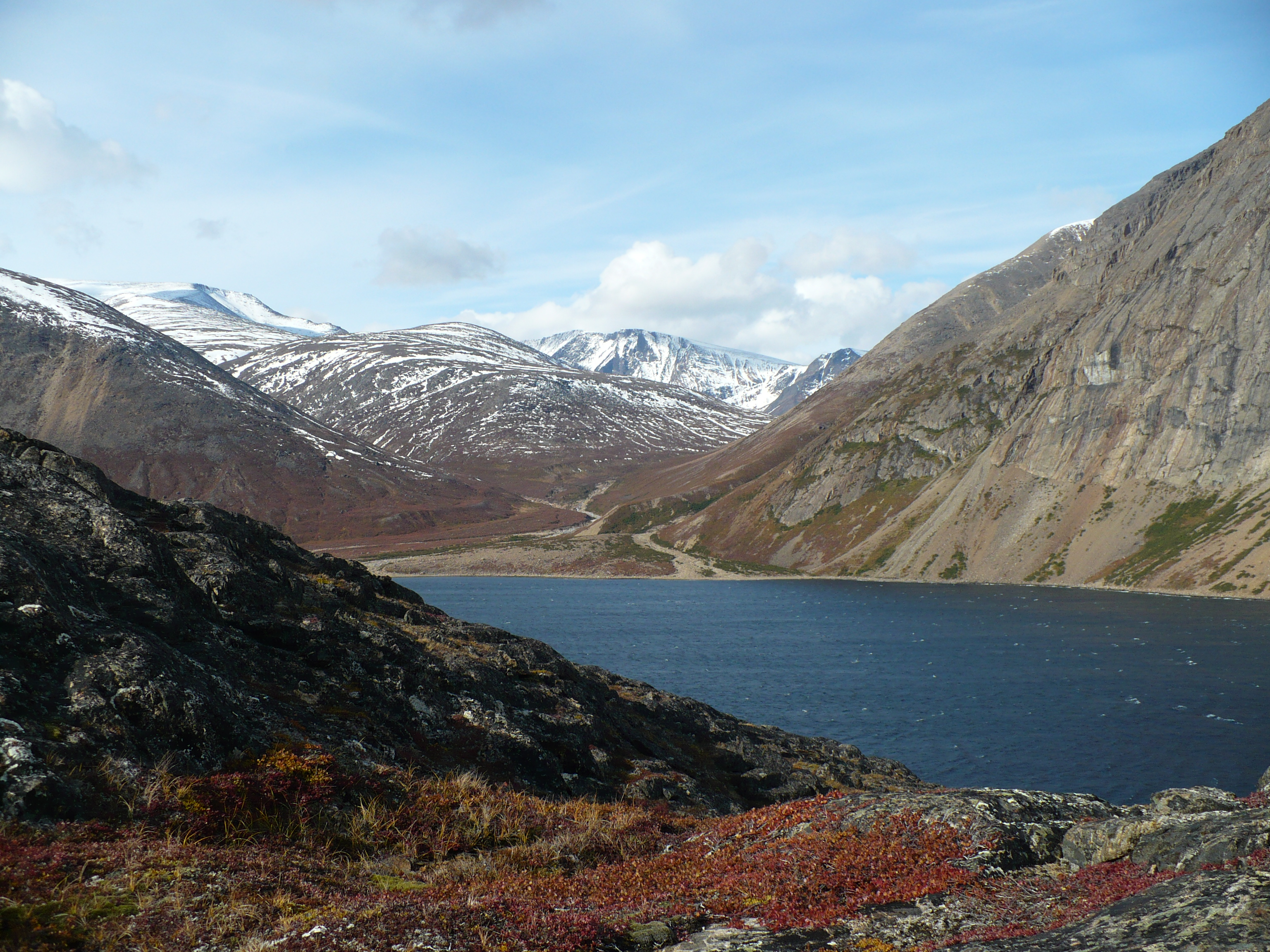
Nachvak Fiord in Torngat Mountains National Park.

Another example is Torngat Mountains National Park. In 2005, it was established as a result of the Labrador Inuit Land Claims Agreement. It preserves the aboriginal rights of the Labrador Inuit in Canada, which are land, resources and self-government rights. The federal government also signed the Labrador Inuit Park Impacts and Benefits Agreement with Inuit Association. As with the Ivvavik agreement, it ensures that Inuit can continue to use land and resources as their traditional activities and keep their exclusive relationship with the land and ecosystems. In addition, they agreed to manage the park cooperatively. A seven-member co-operative management board was established to advise the federal minister of Environment for the matters of parks eco-management.

Parks Canada recognized Indigenous knowledge and their unique historical and cultural relationship with the lands, and thus, Parks Canada started to cooperate with Indigenous people for park management. Following 1985, began the creation of new national parks or national park reserves, including Aulavik, Nááts’ihch’oh, Tuktut Nogait and Thaidene Nëné, in the Northwest Territories. Qausuittuq, Quttinirpaaq, Sirmilik and Ukkusiksalik, in Nunavut. Akami-Uapishkᵁ-KakKasuak-Mealy. Mountains and Torngat Mountains in Newfoundland and Labrador. Sable Island, Nova Scotia. The Bruce Peninsula and Rouge in Ontario. Wapusk, Manitoba, and Gwaii Haanas and Gulf Islands in British Columbia.

== Adding to the system ==
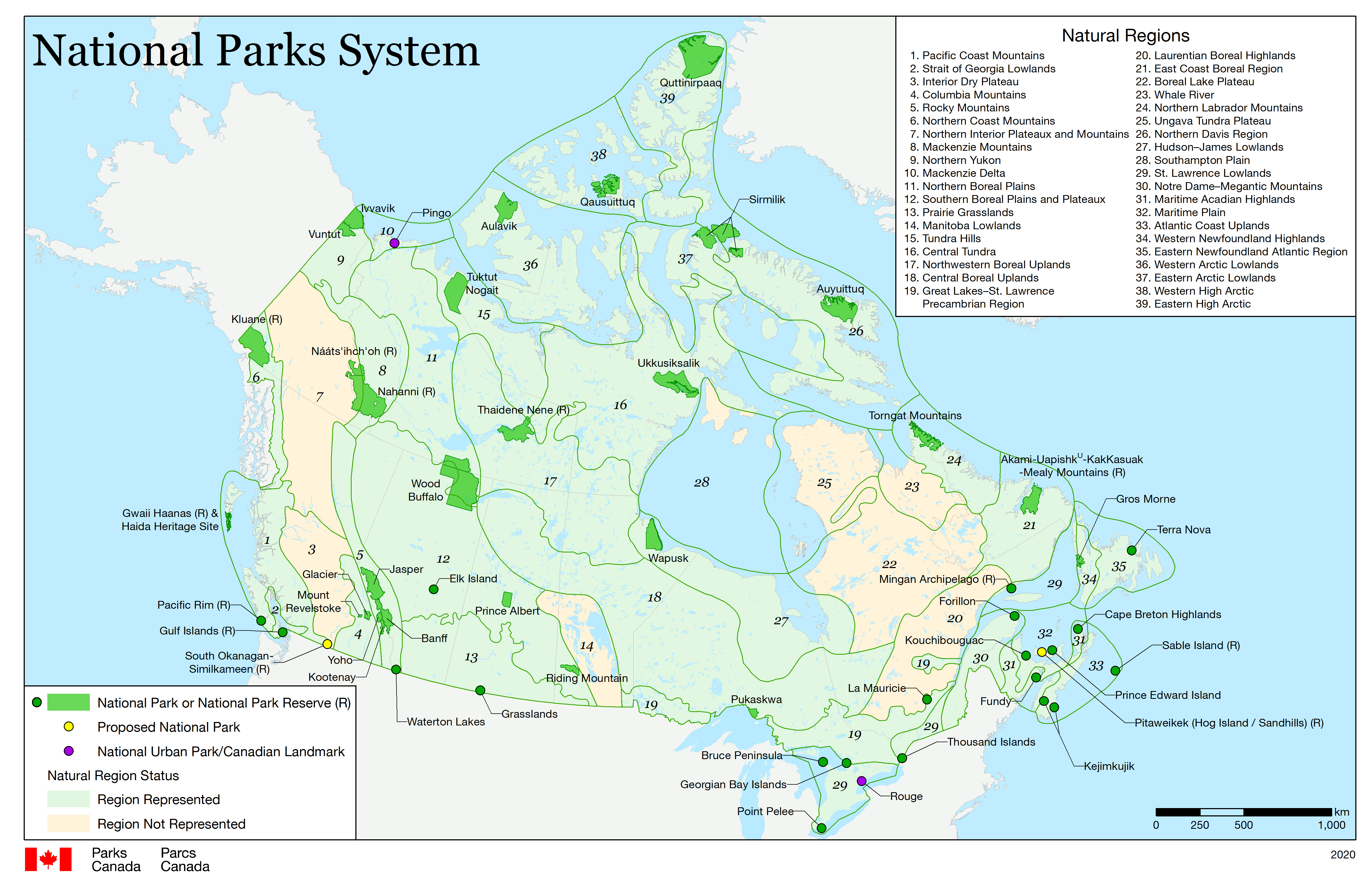
Locations of proposed national parks within the various natural regions outlined by Parks Canada.

=== Proposed national parks and national park reserves ===
A national park reserve is an area administered and protected like a national park but subject to Indigenous land claims. It is expected that park reserves will become national parks under the National Parks Act when the land claims are resolved. These include:

- Gwaii Haanas
- Gulf Islands
- Kluane (a portion of the park is designated as a Reserve)
- Mealy Mountains
- Mingan Archipelago National Park Reserve
- Naats'ihch'oh
- Nahanni
- Pacific Rim
- Pituamkek
- Sable Island
- Thaidene Nëné

The following areas have been proposed as Parks or Reserves, studied, and discussed among stakeholders:

- Seal River Watershed in northern Manitoba (as a national park reserve).
- South Okanagan-Similkameen in the southern interior of British Columbia (as a national park reserve).

In addition, Parks Canada is considering other areas for future national parks:

- Expanding Waterton Lakes National Park in Alberta into the Flathead Valley in British Columbia (as a national park reserve)

=== NMCA and NMCA Reserves ===
National Marine Conservation Areas (NMCAs) are a relatively new creation within the park system. There are currently three NMCAs:

- Fathom Five National Marine Park, Ontario
- Lake Superior NMCA, Ontario
- Saguenay–St. Lawrence Marine Park, Quebec

Fathom Five National Marine Park and Saguenay–St. Lawrence Marine Park were created prior to the NMCA concept, and subsequently classified as an NMCA without changing their legal names. NMCAs have a different mandate than their terrestrial counterparts. They are designed for sustainable use, although they usually also contain areas designed to protect ecological integrity.

Similar to national park reserves, National Marine Conservation Area Reserves are intended to become full NMCAs once claims are resolved. There is currently one NMCA Reserve:

- Gwaii Haanas National Marine Conservation Area Reserve and Haida Heritage Site, adjacent to the national park reserve of the same name, in British Columbia

Two areas are under consideration as a National Marine Conservation Area or NMCA Reserve:

- Southern Strait of Georgia NMCA Reserve, in British Columbia, surrounding Gulf Islands National Park Reserve—a feasibility study is underway
- Tallurutiup Imanga NMCA, in Nunavut

=== National landmarks ===
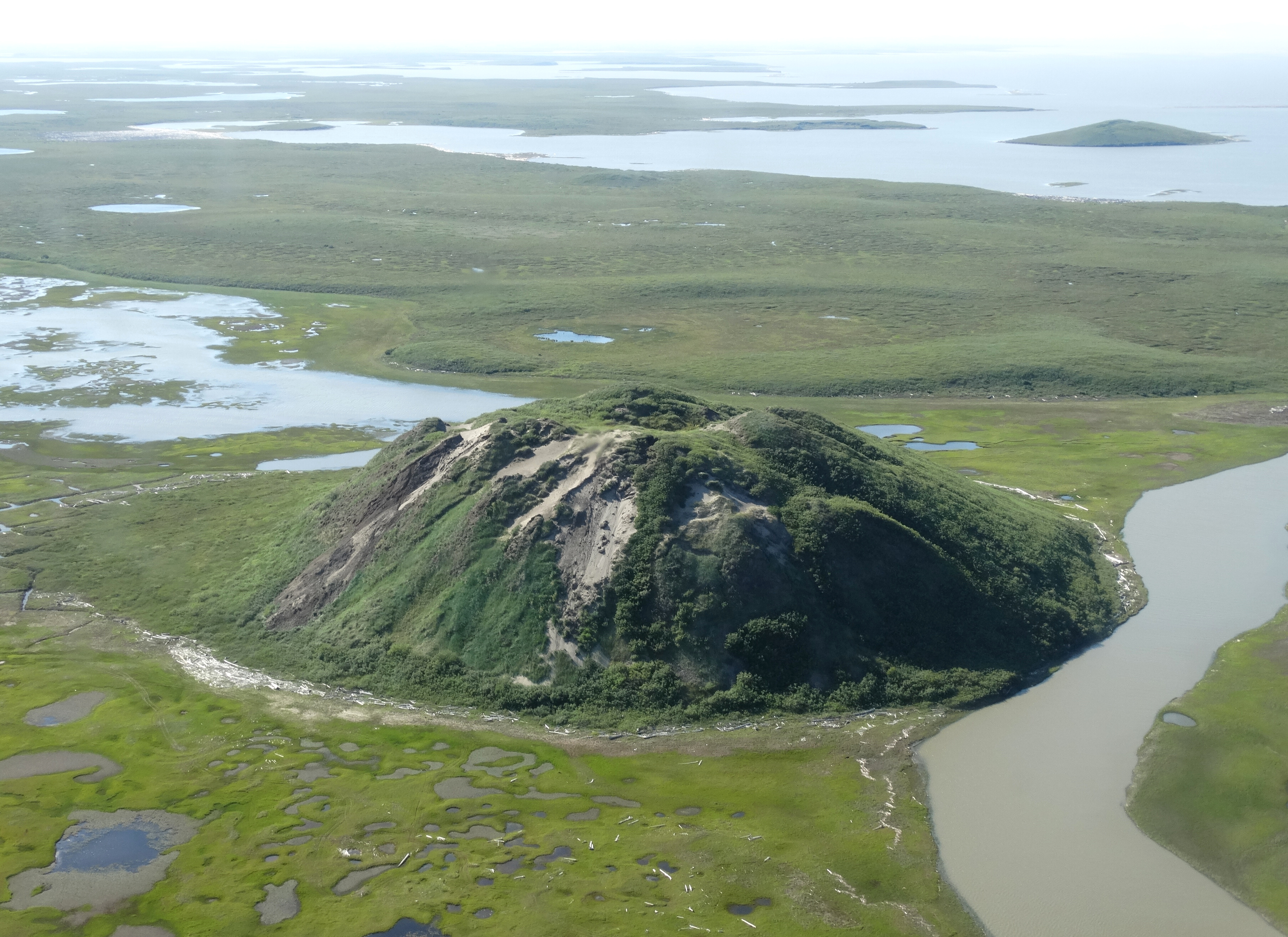
A view of Ibyuk Pingo, Canada's tallest pingo, and one of eight protected by the Pingo Canadian Landmark.

In addition to national parks, a National Landmarks program was foreseen in the 1970s and 1980s, but has not been established beyond a single property. Landmarks were intended to protect specific natural features considered "outstanding, exceptional, unique, or rare to this country. These natural features would typically be isolated entities and of scientific interest."

To date, only one Landmark has been established—Pingo National Landmark—in the Northwest Territories. Another was proposed at the same time (1984)—Nelson Head National Landmark—on the southern tip of Banks Island, also in the Northwest Territories. It was to include some 180 km^{2} (70 sq mi), 40 km (25 mi) of coastline, and protect the sea cliffs at Nelson Head and Cape Lambton. Durham Heights were to be included, which reach an elevation of 747 m (2,450 ft). The legislation providing for the Landmark required a formal request be made by the Minister of the Environment within 10 years (until 1994). None was ever made.

== See also ==
- Tourism in Canada
- List of national parks of Canada
- Protected areas of Canada
- International Union for Conservation of Nature
