= Cascumpec Bay =

Bay in Prince Edward Island, Canada

Coordinates: 46°46′N 64°3′W

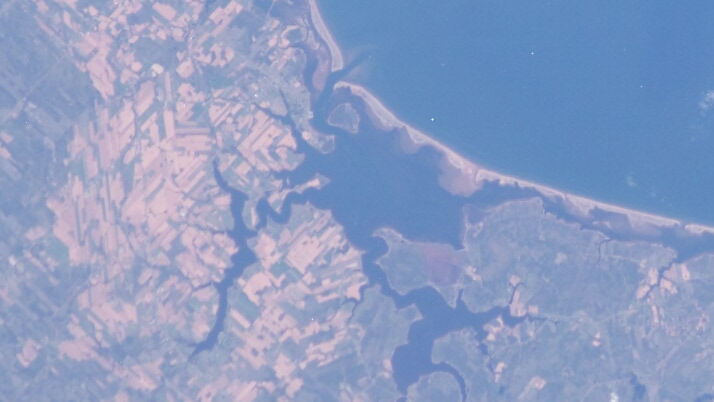
Cascumpec Bay viewed from space

Cascumpec Bay is within Prince Edward Island in Canada and is adjacent to the Gulf of Saint Lawrence.

== Description ==
Cascumpec Bay is located where Prince Edward Island's north shore at its northwestern extreme turns northeasterly to become the east shore of the island's Northeast Peninsula. The bay covers an area of approximately 40 square kilometres (15 sq mi) and is relatively shallow. Cascumpec Bay fronts the Gulf of Saint Lawrence along its eastern side but is protected from gulf by a series of sandy barrier islands. Most of the protection is provided by the Cascumpec Sand Hills, a single long barrier island given its name because of its extensive sand dunes. Several estuaries are located along the landward sides of the bay, including the Kildare River, Mill River, Foxely River and Trout River. The lands at the south end of the bay east of the Foxely River are almost entirely composed of peat and are known locally as the Black Banks. Apart from the Black Banks, the Sand Hills, and most other islands, the rest of the land surrounding the bay is largely devoted to intensive agriculture.

Alberton Harbour is a northern lobe of Cascumpec Bay, separated from the main body of the bay by Oultons Island. Alberton Harbour has its own passage into the Gulf of Saint Lawrence between the north end of the Sand Hills and the south extreme of Kildare Point, a sand spit that directs the Kildare River into the harbour instead of into the gulf. The passage made Alberton Harbour an attractive shelter during the age of sailing and encouraged local seafaring settlements. On the west side of Alberton Harbour opposite the passage is the town of Alberton with about 1100 residents. Also on the harbour is Northport, a fishing village to the south of Alberton with about 250 residents. These are the only two incorporated settlements near Cascumpec Bay.

== Name origin ==
The name Cascumpec originated as the Mi'kmaq name "Kaskamkek", which means "bold sandy shore". In the 18th century, the name mutated slightly to the French name "Cachecampec", and then to the English adaptation "Kascumpeck". Since then, the pronunciation has changed very little, but the current spelling was settled only in 1966.

== Bird habitat ==
Cascumpec Bay ecosystem is identified by Nature Canada as an Important Bird Area. Of particular interest are its use for migration staging by large numbers of migrating Canada geese, and as nesting habitat for great blue heron and osprey. Also, the Cascumpec Sand Hills sometimes host nests of piping plover and colonies of common tern.

== See also ==
- Malpeque Bay
