= Malpeque Bay =

- Location within Prince Edward Island

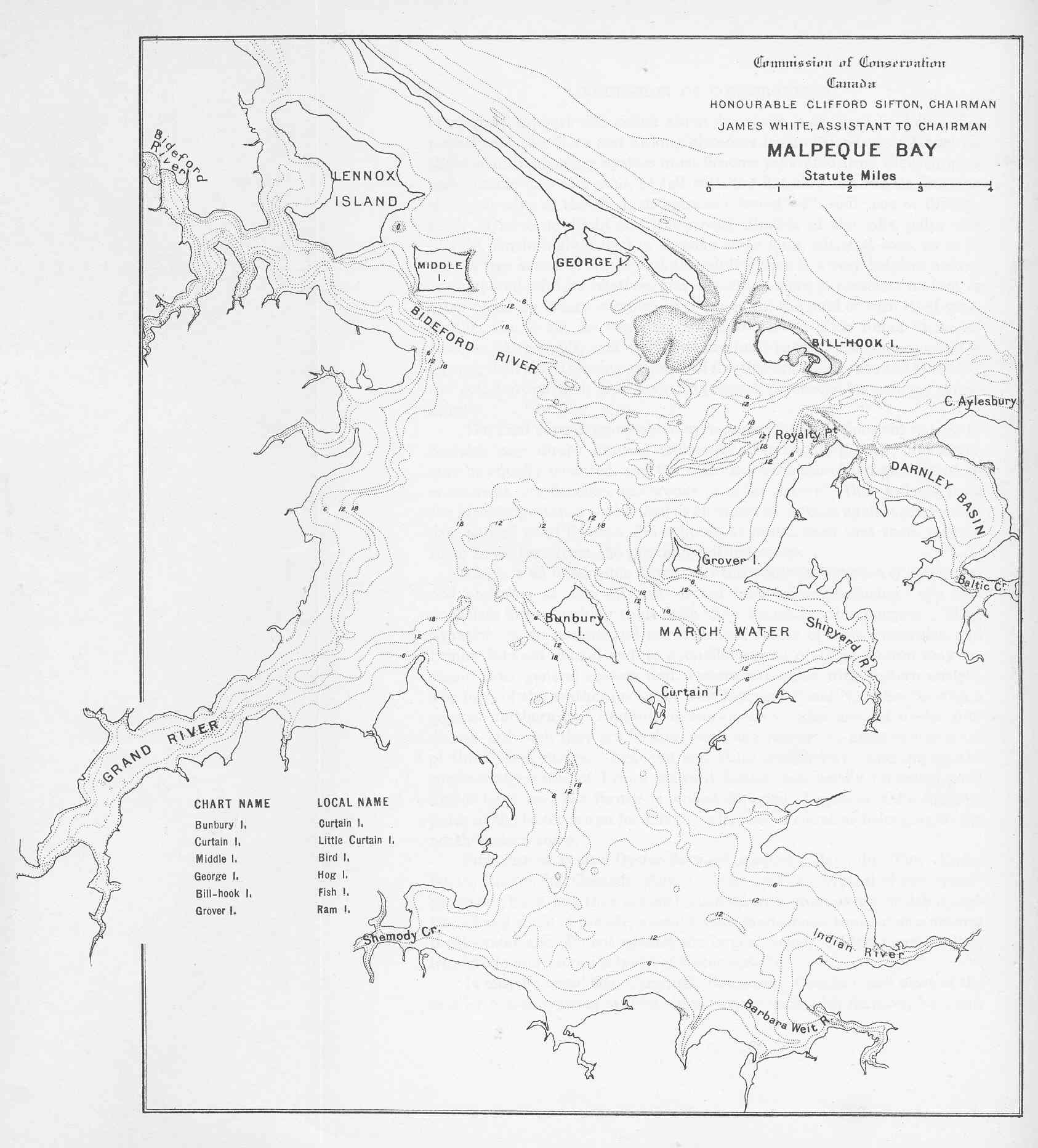
- Bathymetric map of Malpeque Bay, 1913
- Coordinates: 46°32′N 63°47′W
- Type: Estuarine bay
- Primary inflows: Gulf of St. Lawrence
- Primary outflows: Gulf of St. Lawrence
- Basin countries: Canada
- Designation

Ramsar Wetland
- Designated: 28 April 1988
- Reference no.: 399
- Surface area: 204 km^{2} (79 sq mi)
- Max. depth: 13 m (43 ft)

Malpeque Bay is a 204 km^{2} (79 sq mi) estuarine bay on the north shore of Prince Edward Island, Canada.

== Description ==
Malpeque Bay is the second largest bay in terms of surface area in Prince Edward Island, following Hillsborough Bay. It is also notable for almost dividing the province; an isthmus occupied by the city of Summerside and the unincorporated communities of North St. Eleanors, Sherbrooke and Travellers Rest separates Malpeque Bay from Bedeque Bay on the island's south shore.

== Islands ==
Malpeque Bay has several islands located along its northern border as well as entirely within the bay itself:

- Mary Fraser Island
- Courtin Island
- Little Courtin Island
- Little Rock
- Ram Island
- Bird Island
- Lennox Island
- Hog Island, a barrier island forming the northern boundary of Malpeque Bay
- Fish Island, a section of Hog Island that occasionally separates/joins due to erosion and accretion

== Inlets ==
Malpeque Bay has several inlets:

- Hardys Channel, separating Hog Island and the Conway Sand Hills connects the northwestern part of Malpeque Bay to the open Gulf of St. Lawrence
- Conway Narrows, connects the northwestern part of Malpeque Bay to Cascumpec Bay
- Ship Channel / Malpeque Harbour, separating Hog Island/Fish Island from Royalty Point in Prince Royalty, connecting the northeastern part of Malpque Bay to the open Gulf of St. Lawrence

== Communities ==
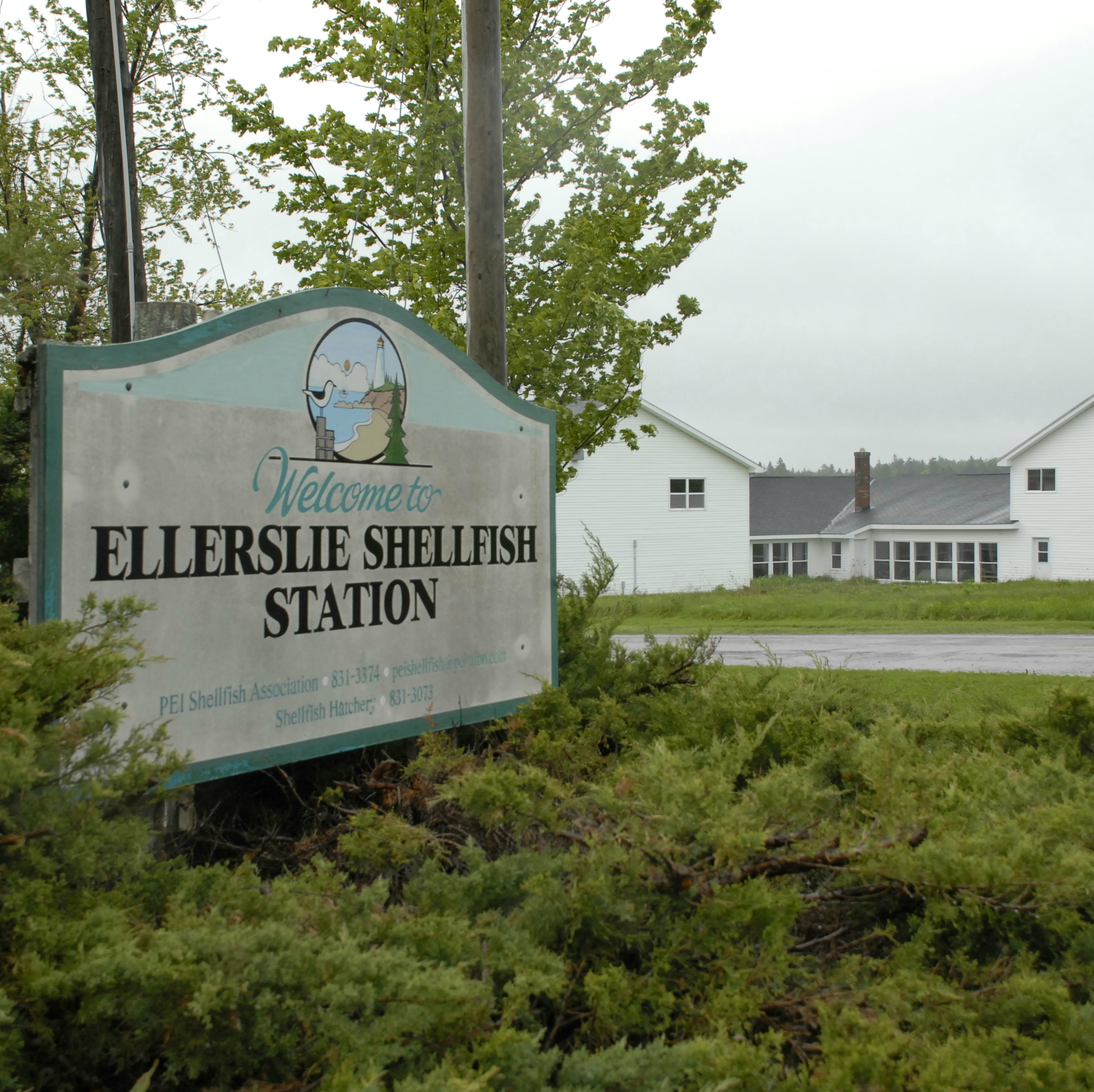
Sign outside the Ellerslie Shellfish Station in Prince County, Prince Edward Island, Canada. Situated on an arm of Malpeque Bay, this is a centre of the famed Malpeque Oyster industry.

The city of Summerside is the largest population centre directly fronting the bay. The following communities are located along the bay's shoreline from west to east:

- East Bideford
- Lennox Island First Nation
- Port Hill
- Birch Hill
- Bayside
- Grand River
- Wellington Centre
- Southwest Lot 16
- Central Lot 16
- Belmont Lot 16
- North St. Eleanors
- Slemon Park
- Summerside
- Sherbrooke
- Travellers Rest
- New Annan
- Clermont
- Indian River
- Hamilton
- Baltic
- Malpeque
- Darnley

== Ramsar site ==
Malpeque Bay was classified as a wetland of international importance via the Ramsar Convention on April 28, 1988. It consists of marine and coastal wetlands ranging in altitude from sea level to 8 m. It is protected from the Gulf of St. Lawrence by a sandspit and dune formation that stretches 25 km. Small rivers and creeks are the source of freshwater for the lagoon.

It is "important for supporting large nesting colonies" of herons and cormorants, and is a meaningful nursery area for fin and shell fishes. Malpeque oysters are prized by connoisseurs.

The bay supports several recreational areas, primarily at Cabot Beach Provincial Park and Green Park Provincial Park.

There is some concern regarding development of the area and its surroundings. There has been extensive cottage development on the eastern and southern shores of the bay since the 1950s. Prince Edward Island's largest industrial operation, two french fry processing plants operated by Cavendish Farms, discharge into the Barbara Weit River in the southeastern corner of the bay. A petition was also organized in the early 2000s to stop a proposed wind energy project along the eastern shore of the bay which was submitted to Natural Resources Canada. However, the development never took place. The recreational use of the area is a "threat to nesting and brood-rearing Piping plovers."
