= List of national parks of Canada =

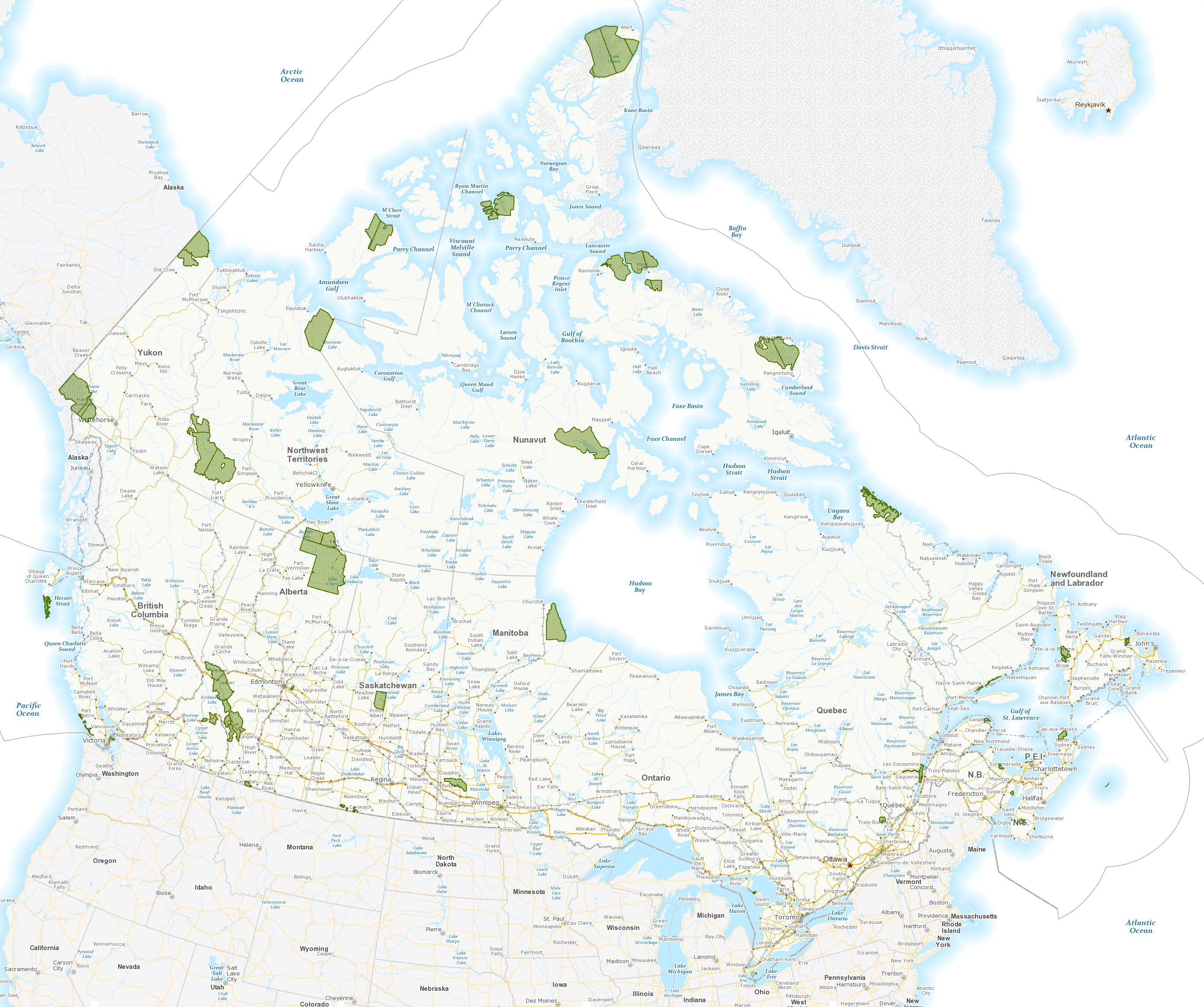
Parks in Canada's provinces and territories

Canada's national parks are protected areas under the Canada National Parks Act, owned by the Government of Canada and administered for the benefit, education, and enjoyment of the people of Canada and its future generations. National parks are administered by Parks Canada, a Crown agency operating under the jurisdiction of the Ministry of Environment and Climate Change. The goal of the national parks system is to set aside lands representing the country's 39 distinct natural regions described in the National Parks System Plan, primarily to protect the ecological integrity of the land, and secondarily to allow the public to explore, learn about and enjoy Canada's natural spaces.

Canada's first national park was created in 1885 through an Order-in-Council to reserve 26 km^{2} (10 sq mi) over the Cave and Basin Hot Springs to prevent the land from being sold for private development despite claims being made for it. Modelled after the American experience with Yellowstone National Park, the Rocky Mountains Park Act, adopted in 1887, established the Rocky Mountains Park (now Banff National Park). The idea of a national park was popular and led to numerous proposals for the Ministry of the Interior to consider, including additional sites along the Canadian Pacific Railway (e.g. Yoho and Glacier and an expansion of Banff) and the Grand Trunk Pacific Railway (e.g. Jasper). In 1911 the Rocky Mountains Park Act was replaced by the Dominion Forest Reserves and Parks Act which created the world's first National Park Service, the Dominion Parks Branch, to administer national parks in Canada. These early national parks, including those established under the leadership of JB Harkin who was the first commissioner of the Dominion Parks Branch, were set aside to reserve lands principally for tourism and conservation but also had an exclusionary policy prohibiting First Nations peoples from using their traditional lands within the new parks. In 1922, Wood Buffalo National Park was the first to allow traditional indigenous activities to continue. In 1972, Parks Canada defined national park reserves as lands administered by the agency intended to become national parks pending settlement of indigenous land rights and agreements for continued traditional use of the lands.

As of July 2024, there are 37 national parks and 11 national park reserves, covering an area of approximately 343,377 km^{2} (132,579 sq mi), or about 3.3% of the total land area of Canada, and representing 31 of its 39 natural regions. There is at least one park located in every one of the nation's 13 provinces and territories. Parks Canada reported attendance of 15,449,249 at all national parks and reserves in 2016–17, including over four million visits to the busiest park (Banff) and only two persons at the least-visited park (Tuktut Nogait). Parks Canada additionally manages three National Marine Conservation Areas (NMCAs), a single NMCA Reserve, and the country's lone National Landmark. The Canada National Parks Act also allows for recognition of National Historic Sites that commemorate events, landmarks, or objects of national importance, and which may include similar levels of protection and administration as national parks. Feasibility studies are underway to establish further national parks in unrepresented regions.

== National parks and national park reserves ==
National park reserves are indicated by "(Reserve)" after the park name. The national urban park is indicated by "(Urban)" after the park name.

* UNESCO World Heritage Site
† UNESCO Biosphere Reserve
‡ Parks designated in both UNESCO programs

National parks and national park reserves
Name	Photo	Location	Established	Area (2017)	Annual visitors (2022–23)	Natural region	Description
Akami−Uapishkᵘ− KakKasuak−Mealy Mountains (Reserve)		Newfoundland and Labrador; 53°24′N 59°22′W	31 July 2015	10,700 km^{2} (4,131 sq mi)		East coast boreal	The park includes a portion of the glacially-rounded Mealy Mountains on Labrador from Lake Melville to Sandwich Bay and includes some sandy beaches along the coast of the Labrador Sea.
Aulavik		Northwest Territories; 73°42′N 119°55′W	1992	12,200 km^{2} (4,710 sq mi)	34	Western arctic lowlands	Located on the northern part of Banks Island, the completely treeless polar desert of Aulavik is home to the world's largest concentration of muskoxen, as well as the endangered Peary caribou.
Auyuittuq		Nunavut; 67°53′N 65°01′W	2001	19,089 km^{2} (7,370 sq mi)	256	Northern Davis region	One of Canada's largest parks and located almost entirely within the Arctic Circle, Auyuittuq on Baffin Island preserves a rugged arctic wilderness featuring some of the highest peaks of the Canadian Shield.
Banff *		Alberta; 51°30′N 116°0′W	25 November 1885	6,641 km^{2} (2,564 sq mi)	4,130,081	Rocky Mountains	The first park established by the federal government of Canada, Banff includes the Valley of the Ten Peaks, the Wapta and Waputik Icefields, several ski resorts, and the communities of Lake Louise and Banff. It is part of the Canadian Rocky Mountain Parks World Heritage Site and adjacent to Kootenay, Yoho, and Jasper National Parks.
Bruce Peninsula †		Ontario; 45°14′N 81°37′W	1987	125 km^{2} (48 sq mi)	460,435	St. Lawrence lowlands	Formed from lands previously designated Ontario's Cyprus Lake Provincial Park, Bruce preserves a unique shoreline formation of the Niagara Escarpment and forms part of the larger UNESCO Niagara Escarpment Biosphere Reserve. The Bruce Trail, one of Canada's longest hiking trails, passes through the park. The locally threatened massasauga rattlesnake is found within the park, as well as Canada's southernmost population of black bears.
Cape Breton Highlands		Nova Scotia; 46°43′N 60°40′W	1936	948 km^{2} (366 sq mi)	277,203	Maritime Acadian highlands	Atlantic Canada's oldest national park features Acadian and boreal forest environments in the Cape Breton Highlands. One-third of the Cabot Trail passes through the central portion of the park. Most of Nova Scotia's population of Canada lynx are found in this park, and the endangered North Atlantic right whale is found in waters off the park's coast. Western moose were introduced to this park from Alberta's Elk Island National Park between 1947 and 1948, the native eastern moose having been hunted to near-extinction. Parks Canada started a four-year project with the Unama'ki Institute of Natural Resources and other partners to begin to restore boreal forest regions within this park in 2014.
Elk Island †		Alberta; 53°37′N 112°52′W	1913	194 km^{2} (75 sq mi)	409,891	Southern boreal plains & plateaux	Created as a wildlife sanctuary for elk, the park has become a part of bison conservation, the Beaver Hills Dark Sky Preserve, and the Beaver Hills Biosphere Reserve. Eighteen moose (nine males and nine females) from Elk Island were introduced to Nova Scotia's Cape Breton Highlands National Park between 1947 and 1948.
Forillon		Quebec; 48°54′N 64°21′W	8 June 1970 (federal-provincial agreement)	240 km^{2} (93 sq mi)	164,130	Notre Dame & Megantic Mountains	The lands of the first park in Quebec were traditional hunting and fishing grounds for the Mi'kmaq and Iroquois, and were exploited for their rich supplies of lumber. Two hundred twenty-five families were controversially expropriated from the park lands prior to creation of the park in 1970. In 2011, the Government of Canada issued a formal apology to these families for their mistreatment.
Fundy †		New Brunswick; 45°36′N 64°57′W	1948	206 km^{2} (80 sq mi)	303,575	Maritime Acadian highlands	Featuring the highest tides in the world, the Bay of Fundy exposes ocean floor at low tide which is covered by up to 16 m (52 ft) of salt water at high tide. The park forms the core portion of the UNESCO Fundy Biosphere Reserve.
Georgian Bay Islands †		Ontario; 44°53′N 79°52′W	1930	14 km^{2} (5 sq mi)	27,482	Great Lakes—St. Lawrence precambrian region	Beausoleil Island is the largest of the small islands which make up the park, which originally included Flowerpot Island. The islands form part of the UNESCO Georgian Bay Littoral Biosphere Reserve.
Glacier		British Columbia; 51°18′N 117°31′W	10 October 1886	1,349 km^{2} (521 sq mi)	775,190	Columbia Mountains	Representative of the Columbia Mountains natural region, this park includes Illecillewaet Glacier, Rogers Pass, Nakimu Caves, Mount Sir Donald, and Mount Dawson.
Grasslands		Saskatchewan; 49°12′N 107°43′W	1981	730 km^{2} (282 sq mi) (905 km^{2} (349 sq mi) proposed)	19,656	Prairie grasslands	Located along the borders with the American state of Montana, the park features an undisturbed mixed-grass prairie ecosystem and badlands where fossils from both the Frenchman and Bearpaw Formations were discovered including those of a Triceratops and a Tyrannosaurus.
Gros Morne *		Newfoundland and Labrador; 49°41′N 57°44′W	1 October 2005 (national park); August 1973 (national park reserve)	1,805 km^{2} (697 sq mi)	-	Western Newfoundland highlands	A World Heritage Site due to its exposed mantle and crust as an example of plate tectonics, the park also includes Western Brook Pond, Lobster Cove, and Gros Morne mountain in the Long Range Mountains chain.
Gulf Islands (Reserve)		British Columbia; 48°51′N 123°27′W	9 May 2003	37 km^{2} (14 sq mi)	28,434	Strait of Georgia lowlands	Representative of the Strait of Georgia Lowlands, the park includes 6 km^{2} of marine environment and land on 15 islands.
Gwaii Haanas * (Note: South Moresby National Park Reserve was created 12 July 1988, with the signing of the South Moresby Agreement; renamed Gwaii Haanas National Park Reserve and Haida Heritage Site on 28 February 1996. Includes SGaang Gwaii (Anthony Island) World Heritage Site.) (Reserve)		British Columbia; 52°23′N 131°28′W	1988	1,474 km^{2} (569 sq mi)	2,651	Pacific coast mountains	Forming the southern end of the Haida Gwaii archipelago, the park is on the far western end of Canada and includes 138 islands, inclusive of Ninstints World Heritage Site, Hotspring Island, and the southern tip of Moresby Island.
Ivvavik (Note: Established as Northern Yukon National Park in 1984, renamed Ivvavik National Park in 1992.)		Yukon; 69°31′N 139°31′W	1984	9,750 km^{2} (3,764 sq mi)	179	Northern Yukon	Adjacent to Vuntut National Park and the American Arctic National Wildlife Refuge, the park has arctic tundra that was not glaciated during the last ice age and consequently contains the oldest river in Canada, the Firth River. Ivvavik is the first national park created as a result of an aboriginal land claim agreement, the Inuvialuit Final Agreement.
Jasper *		Alberta; 52°48′N 117°54′W	14 September 1907	11,228 km^{2} (4,335 sq mi)	2,415,463	Rocky Mountains	Part of the Canadian Rocky Mountain Parks World Heritage Site and adjacent to the Banff National Parks, as well as Mount Robson and Hamber Provincial Parks in British Columbia, this park includes the community of Jasper, Columbia Icefield, Athabasca Falls, Sunwapta Falls, Maligne Lake, and canyon, and the Snow Dome, a hydrological apex of North America, at its boundary with the Banff National Park.
Kejimkujik †		Nova Scotia; 44°24′N 65°13′W	1967	404 km^{2} (156 sq mi)	75,284	Atlantic coast plain	The area around Kejimikujik Lake was acquired by the federal government for park purposes in 1967 and added a 22 km^{2} seaside component in 1985. The inland portion was designated a National Historic Site in 1995 recognizing its Mi'kmaw cultural landscape and is adjacent to the Tobeatic Wilderness Area. The park is part of the Southwest Nova Biosphere Reserve and a dark-sky preserve.
Kluane * (Park and Reserve) (Note: Kluane National Park Reserve was set aside in 1976, following the Kluane Game Reserve of the early 1940s. Subsequently, an eastern portion of the Reserve became Kluane National Park in 1993.)		Yukon; 60°37′N 138°20′W	29 May 1993 (Park); 1972 (Reserve)	5,900 km^{2} (2,278 sq mi) (Park); 16,080 km^{2} (6,209 sq mi) (Reserve)	47,098	Northern coast mountains	Part of a World Heritage Site and adjacent to the U.S. Wrangell–St. Elias National Park and British Columbian Tatshenshini-Alsek Provincial Park, Kluane features the highest mountain peaks in Canada, including Mount Logan, and the largest non-polar ice field in the world.
Kootenay *		British Columbia; 50°53′N 116°03′W	21 April 1920	1,406 km^{2} (543 sq mi)	574,126	Rocky Mountains	Part of the Canadian Rocky Mountain Parks World Heritage Site and adjacent to the Banff and Yoho National Parks, as well as the Mount Assiniboine Provincial Park, the park is representative of the Rocky Mountains natural region and includes the Radium Hot Springs pools, an outcrop of the Burgess Shale fossil deposit, Numa Falls, and Floe Lake.
Kouchibouguac		New Brunswick; 46°51′N 64°58′W	1969	239 km^{2} (92 sq mi)	243,489	Maritime plain	Located on the coast where the Kouchibouguac River enters the Northumberland Strait, across from the north end of Prince Edward Island, the park illustrates coastal dynamics, including tidal rivers, coastal dunes, salt marshes, bogs, and barrier islands.
La Mauricie		Quebec; 46°48′N 72°58′W	22 August 1970	536 km^{2} (207 sq mi)	278,923	Great Lakes—St. Lawrence precambrian region	Located north of Shawinigan, and between Saint-Maurice River, Matawin River, and Mastigouche Wildlife Reserve, the park features a canoe camping circuit and habitat for the wood turtle.
Mingan Archipelago (Reserve)		Quebec; 50°13′N 63°10′W	1984	151 km^{2} (58 sq mi)	44,017	St. Lawrence lowlands	Located along the Gulf of St. Lawrence, the park consists of the Mingan Archipelago with its limestone outcrops and Atlantic puffin habitat.
Mount Revelstoke		British Columbia; 51°05′N 118°04′W	1914	262 km^{2} (101 sq mi)	775,190	Columbia Mountains	Accessible by a trail from the City of Revelstoke, the park is representative of the Columbia Mountains natural region.
Nááts'ihch'oh (Reserve)		Northwest Territories; 62°22′N 127°58′W	18 December 2014	4,850 km^{2} (1,873 sq mi)	109	Mackenzie Mountains	Adjacent to the Nahanni National Park, Nááts'įhch'oh extends the protected area into the Sahtu Settlement Area to include additional land with the South Nahanni River watershed to Mount Nááts'įhch'oh and the Moose Ponds.
Nahanni * (Reserve)		Northwest Territories; 61°33′N 125°35′W	1974	30,000 km^{2} (11,583 sq mi) (Note: In 2007, the government announced that 29,000 km^{2} (11,197 sq mi) of land would be added to Nahanni, making it 33,766 km^{2} (13,037 sq mi). However, these changes have not been fully implemented as of 2017.)	1,104	Mackenzie Mountains	Containing the first natural World Heritage Site in Canada, the park includes the South Nahanni River, Virginia Falls, the Cirque of the Unclimbables, and a limestone cave system.
Pacific Rim (Note: Only the northwestern end of Pacific Rim National Park Reserve is located within Clayoquot Sound Biosphere Reserve.) (Reserve)		British Columbia; 48°38′N 124°46′W	1970	510 km^{2} (197 sq mi)	1,163,362	Pacific coast mountains	Representative of the coastal plain portion of the Pacific Coast Mountains natural region, the park is divided into three separated parts: Long Beach, the Broken Group islands, and the West Coast Trail.
Pituamkek (Reserve)		Prince Edward Island; 46°36′39″N 63°47′6″W	4 July 2024	30 km^{2} (12 sq mi)		Maritime plain	The park reserve encompasses a 50 km (31 mi) chain of barrier islands, including Hog Island, shielding northwestern Prince Edward Island from the Gulf of St. Lawrence. The islands contain many sites of archaeological and cultural significance to the Mi'kmaq, and the sand dunes of the chain provide habitat to endangered species including the piping plover and northern long-eared bat. The reserve includes Iron Rock, the province's only igneous rock formation.
Point Pelee		Ontario; 41°58′N 82°31′W	29 May 1918	15 km^{2} (6 sq mi)	492,122	St. Lawrence lowlands	The first national park established for conservation, Point Pelee is the southernmost point of the Canadian mainland, and also includes the southernmost point overall on Middle Island. The marshy wetland environment is a known stop for migratory birds and monarch butterflies, and since 1987 is a Ramsar Convention Wetland of International Importance.
Prince Albert		Saskatchewan; 53°58′N 106°22′W	24 March 1927	3,875 km^{2} (1,496 sq mi)	287,372	Southern boreal plains & plateaux	Established with a recreation focus, the park includes a small community on the east end of Waskesiu Lake and features fescue grasslands with plains bison, boreal forest, and Ajawaan, Lavallée Lake, and other lakes.
Prince Edward Island		Prince Edward Island; 46°25′N 63°05′W	1937	27 km^{2} (10 sq mi)	-	Maritime plain	Sensitive sand beaches and dunes on the island's north shore provide nesting habitat for the endangered piping plover and are designated an Important Bird Area. An extension added in 1998 protects parabolic sand dunes and an area with archaeological evidence of Paleo-Indian occupation up to 10,000 years ago. The park also encompasses Green Gables, the inspiration for the popular Anne of Green Gables novels.
Pukaskwa		Ontario; 48°15′N 85°53′W	1971	1,878 km^{2} (725 sq mi)	17,285	Central boreal uplands	Located on the Voyageur Hiking Trail and the longest stretch of undeveloped shoreline in the Great Lakes, Pukaskwa protects an area of boreal forest largely untouched by logging and mining industries, owing to the terrain's remarkable ruggedness. A large cluster of the Pukaskwa Pits are located within the park.
Qausuittuq		Nunavut; 76°00′N 100°00′W	1 September 2015	11,008 km^{2} (4,250 sq mi)		Western high Arctic	Located on Bathurst Island, the park is adjacent to the Polar Bear Pass National Wildlife Area and protects Peary caribou and muskox habitat.
Quttinirpaaq (Note: Ellesmere Island National Park Reserve was established in 1988, renamed Quttinirpaaq in 1999, and became a national park in 2000.)		Nunavut; 82°13′N 72°13′W	1988	37,775 km^{2} (14,585 sq mi)	7	Eastern high Arctic	Located on the polar desert of Ellesmere Island at the northern tip of Canada, the park includes Tanquary Fiord, Barbeau Peak, Lake Hazen, and Fort Conger.
Riding Mountain †		Manitoba; 50°52′N 100°02′W	30 May 1933	2,968 km^{2} (1,146 sq mi)	336,560	Southern boreal plains & plateaux	Part of the Riding Mountain Biosphere Reserve, the park features both boreal and aspen forests among the larger grassland prairie landscape, interspersed with pothole lakes and marshes. The park has an outdoor recreation focus and includes the community of Wasagaming, the East Gate National Historic Site, and formerly the Whitewater prisoners-of-war camp.
Rouge (Urban)		Ontario; 43°56′N 79°14′W	15 May 2015	79.1 km^{2} (31 sq mi)		St. Lawrence lowlands	Located in the Greater Toronto Area beginning at the mouth of the Rouge River and through the east end of Toronto and Markham, the park includes riparian corridors and wetlands with habitat for the Blanding's turtle, as well as Bead Hill National Historic Site.
Sable Island (Reserve)		Nova Scotia; 43°57′N 59°55′W	20 June 2013	30 km^{2} (12 sq mi)	806	Atlantic coast plain	Consisting of Sable Island at the edge of the continental shelf off the coast of Nova Scotia, the island of sand is home to the Sable Island horse and provides habitat for grey seals and beach grass.
Sirmilik		Nunavut; 72°59′N 81°8′W	2001	22,200 km^{2} (8,571 sq mi)	6	Eastern Arctic lowlands	Located on the eastern end of Nunavut, Sirmilik consists of the Byam Martin Mountains of Bylot Island and Baffin Island's Borden Peninsula and Oliver Sound.
Terra Nova		Newfoundland and Labrador; 48°32′N 53°56′W	1957	399 km^{2} (154 sq mi)	45,191	Eastern Newfoundland Atlantic region	The easternmost national park, Terra Nova is located on the east coast of Newfoundland along the Trans-Canada Highway. The park is characteristic of the Newfoundland landscape of low relief and rounded hills, and a rocky coastline of arms, sounds, coves, inlets, sea arches, and caves, as well as habitat for the Newfoundland pine marten.
Thaidene Nëné (Reserve)		Northwest Territories; 62°30′N 111°00′W	21 August 2019	14,305 km^{2} (5,523 sq mi)		Northwestern boreal uplands	Thaidene Nëné, which translates in Canadian English as "Land of the Ancestors", is a protected area that spans 6.5 million acres (26,000 km^{2}) at the transition between boreal forest and tundra. It includes the East Arm of Great Slave Lake, the deepest freshwater source in North America, and provides habitat for red fox, black bear, wolf packs, grizzly bear, lynx, wolverine, marten, Arctic fox, moose, beaver, muskoxen, and critical wintry weather for the last herds of barren-ground caribou.
Thousand Islands †		Ontario; 44°21′N 75°57′W	1904	24 km^{2} (9 sq mi)	109,284	St. Lawrence lowlands	Oldest national park east of the Prairies, it is scattered over all or portions of 26 islands and 80 islets and shoals in the St. Lawrence River, as well as several mainland properties in Leeds and Grenville, east of Kingston, and within the Frontenac Arch Biosphere Reserve.
Torngat Mountains		Newfoundland and Labrador; 59°26′N 63°52′W	10 July 2008	9,700 km^{2} (3,745 sq mi)		Northern Labrador mountains	Located on the northernmost tip of Labrador, adjacent to Quebec's Kuururjuaq Park, and established as part of Inuit Land Claims Agreements, the park includes the Torngat Mountains, Labrador Sea coastline, and Pre-Dorset, Dorset, and Thule archaeological finds.
Tuktut Nogait		Northwest Territories; 68°49′N 121°45′W	1998	18,181 km^{2} (7,020 sq mi)	12	Tundra hills	Within the Inuvialuit Settlement Region, the park was created to protect the Bluenose-West caribou herd and harvesting rights for the Inuvialuit people. It was expanded in 2005 to include a portion of the Sahtu Settlement Area.
Ukkusiksalik		Nunavut; 65°21′N 87°18′W	23 August 2003	20,880 km^{2} (8,062 sq mi)		Central tundra	Named after the Inuit word for soapstone, the park surrounds Wager Bay which is maternity denning areas for polar bears and includes cultural relics of the Dorset and Thule and Aivilingmiut people.
Vuntut		Yukon; 68°22′N 139°51′W	1993	4,345 km^{2} (1,678 sq mi)		Northern Yukon	Adjacent to the Ivvavik National Park and the American Arctic National Wildlife Refuge, the park area was not glaciated during the last ice age and now hosts Pleistocene fossil sites. Remote and inaccessible by road, the park was established, and is operated, in collaboration with the Vuntut Gwitchin First Nation as part of that nation's Final Agreement with Canada.
Wapusk		Manitoba; 57°46′N 93°22′W	1996	11,475 km^{2} (4,431 sq mi)	82	Hudson—James lowlands	Created from a portion of the provincial Churchill Wildlife Management Area, Wapusk helps protect the land base that act as maternity denning areas for polar bears.
Waterton Lakes ‡ (Note: Waterton Lakes National Park is part of Waterton-Glacier International Peace Park, a World Heritage Site which includes the adjoining Glacier National Park in Montana, United States.)		Alberta; 49°03′N 113°55′W	30 May 1895	505 km^{2} (195 sq mi)	475,842	Rocky Mountains	Coupled with American neighbour Glacier National Park in Montana, the Waterton-Glacier International Peace Park is both a World Heritage Site and the oldest transboundary protected area in the world. Anchored by Waterton Lake, home of the historic Prince of Wales Hotel, the park is famous for hiking attractions such as the Crypt Lake Trail.
Wood Buffalo *		Alberta / Northwest Territories; 59°23′N 112°59′W	1922	44,972 km^{2} (17,364 sq mi)	2,399	Northern boreal plains	The largest park in Canada, the park protects the habitat of the wood bison and the breeding grounds of the whooping crane and much of the Peace–Athabasca Delta. It is also a World Heritage Site and the world's largest dark-sky preserve.
Yoho *		British Columbia; 51°24′N 116°29′W	10 October 1886	1,313 km^{2} (507 sq mi)	663,878	Rocky Mountains	Part of the Canadian Rocky Mountain Parks World Heritage Site and adjacent to the Banff and Kootenay National Parks, Yoho includes the community of Field, Burgess Shale fossil deposit, Emerald Lake, Takakkaw Falls, and Kicking Horse River.

=== By province/territory ===
Parks by province/territory
Province/Territory	Number	Parks
British Columbia	7	Glacier, Gulf Islands, Gwaii Haanas, Kootenay, Mount Revelstoke, Pacific Rim, Yoho
Northwest Territories	6	Aulavik, Nááts'ihch'oh, Nahanni, Thaidene Nëné, Tuktut Nogait, Wood Buffalo
Ontario	6	Bruce Peninsula, Georgian Bay Islands, Point Pelee, Pukaskwa, Rouge, Thousand Islands
Alberta	5	Banff, Elk Island, Jasper, Waterton Lakes, Wood Buffalo
Nunavut	5	Auyuittuq, Qausuittuq, Quttinirpaaq, Sirmilik, Ukkusiksalik
Newfoundland and Labrador	4	Akami-Uapishkᵘ-KakKasuak-Mealy Mountains, Gros Morne, Terra Nova, Torngat Mountains
Nova Scotia	3	Cape Breton Highlands, Kejimkujik, Sable Island
Quebec	3	Forillon, La Mauricie, Mingan Archipelago
Yukon	3	Ivvavik, Kluane, Vuntut
Manitoba	2	Riding Mountain, Wapusk
New Brunswick	2	Fundy, Kouchibouguac
Prince Edward Island	2	Pituamkek, Prince Edward Island
Saskatchewan	2	Grasslands, Prince Albert

=== Proposed National Parks, Urban Parks, and Park Reserves ===
The following are areas which Parks Canada is in the process of evaluating as potential parks. While they may be reserved from alienation or have federal-provincial/territorial agreements, they have not been formally established through legislation as parks.

Proposed National Parks, Urban Parks, and Park Reserves
Name	Location	Area	Natural region or metropolitan area
Blue Mountain-Birch Cove Lakes (Urban)	Nova Scotia; 44°41′2″N 63°40′23″W	Approx. 23 km^{2} (9 sq mi)	Halifax metropolitan area
Meewasin Valley (Urban)	Saskatchewan; 52°7′49″N 106°38′57″W	Approx. 67 km^{2} (26 sq mi)	Saskatoon metropolitan area
Ojibway (Urban)	Ontario; 42°25′57″N 83°6′51″W	Approx. 8.75 km^{2} (3 sq mi)	Windsor metropolitan area
Seal River Watershed	Manitoba; 58°42′51″N 98°28′54″W	Approx. 50,000 km^{2} (19,305 sq mi)	Northwestern boreal uplands
South Okanagan—Similkameen	British Columbia; 49°4′N 119°41′W	Approx. 284 km^{2} (110 sq mi)	Interior dry plateau
Teetł’it Gwinjik (Peel River) Watershed	Yukon; 67°0′0″N 134°59′3″W	Approx. 39,300 km^{2} (15,174 sq mi)	Northern Boreal Plains
Tū Łī́dlini (Ross River)	Yukon; 61°59′N 132°25′W	Approx. 3,000 km^{2} (1,158 sq mi)	Northern Interior Plateaux and Mountains

There remain six Natural Regions unrepresented by either current or proposed parks. As Parks Canada has a long-term goal of preserving representative areas of all Natural Regions, future parks will likely be established in these areas. These regions are:

- the "Boreal Lake Plateau" region of Newfoundland and Labrador and Quebec
- the "Laurentian Boreal Highlands" region of Newfoundland and Labrador and Quebec
- the "Manitoba Lowlands" region of Manitoba
- the "Southampton Plain" region of Nunavut
- the "Ungava Tundra Plateau" region of Quebec and Nunavut
- the "Whale River" region of Newfoundland and Labrador, Nunavut, and Quebec

=== Abolished national parks ===
Abolished national parks
Name	Location	Established	Abolished
Brereton Lake Dominion Park	Manitoba	1922	1930
Buffalo National Park	Alberta	7 March 1908	17 July 1947
Menissawok National Park	Saskatchewan	31 May 1922	30 May 1930
Nemiskam National Park	Alberta	1914	17 July 1947
Vidal Point Dominion Park	Saskatchewan	31 October 1921	30 May 1930
Wawaskesy National Park	Alberta	31 May 1922	24 June 1938

- Brereton and Vidal were transferred to provincial jurisdiction, both continuing as (renamed) provincial parks.
- Buffalo, Menissawok, Nemiskam and Wawaskesy were created expressly to protect and regenerate dangerously low populations of bison and pronghorn, and were delisted when those populations improved.

== National Marine Conservation Areas ==
National Marine Conservation Areas (NMCAs) is a program established in 2002 with the goal of preserving marine ecosystems representing the 29 marine regions of Canada. They are designed for sustainable use, although they usually also contain areas designed to protect ecological integrity. National Marine Conservation Area Reserves are protected areas proposed to be added to the NMCA system pending settlement of indigenous land and water rights. In the interim, they are administered under park rules.

As of 2020, established NMCAs and NMCA Reserves protect 14,846 km^{2} (5,732 sq mi) of waters, wetlands, and coastlines, representing five of the 29 identified marine regions with studies underway for protected areas in three additional regions.

† UNESCO Biosphere Reserve

National Marine Conservation Areas
Name	Photo	Location	Established	Area (2017)	Annual visitors (2022–23)	Marine region	Description
Fathom Five †		Ontario; 45°19′N 81°38′W	20 July 1987	114 km^{2} (44 sq mi)	227,828	Georgian Bay	The marine counterpart to Bruce National Park, Fathom Five is named for a line in Shakespeare's The Tempest. The first marine unit in the national parks system preserves a unique aquatic environment and several small islands including Flowerpot Island. The unusually clear waters and numerous shipwrecks on the shoals of Georgian Bay make the park a popular destination for scuba divers.
Gwaii Haanas (Reserve)		British Columbia; 52°0′N 131°12′W	11 June 2010	1,500 km^{2} (579 sq mi)	2,651	Hecate Strait, Queen Charlotte Shelf	Along with the national park reserve of the same name, Gwaii Haanas protects an area extending from the ocean floor of the Hecate Strait and Queen Charlotte Basin to the mountains of the Haida Gwaii. The marine reserve preserves the Haida people's traditional use of the waters while protecting the area from oil exploration and commercial fishing.
Lake Superior		Ontario; 48°26′N 89°13′W	1 September 2015	10,880 km^{2} (4,201 sq mi)		Lake Superior	Adjacent to the United States' Isle Royale National Park and several Ontario provincial parks, Lake Superior NMCA forms part of the world's largest freshwater reserve.
Saguenay–St. Lawrence †		Quebec; 48°4′N 69°40′W	8 June 1998	1,245 km^{2} (481 sq mi)	1,070,634	St. Lawrence Estuary	Located at the confluence of the Saguenay and St. Lawrence rivers and adjacent to Quebec's Saguenay Fjord National Park, Saguenay–St. Lawrence protects a portion of the St. Lawrence estuary, a common feeding ground for marine mammals such as the endangered St. Lawrence beluga whale.

=== Proposed National Marine Conservation Areas ===
Proposed National Marine Conservation Areas
Study area	Location	Area	Marine region
Magdalen Islands	Quebec; 47°35′N 61°32′W	16,500 km^{2} (6,371 sq mi)	Magdalen shallows
Southern Strait of Georgia (Reserve)	British Columbia; 49°18′N 123°48′W	1,400 km^{2} (541 sq mi)	Strait of Georgia
Tallurutiup Imanga	Nunavut; 74°13′N 84°0′W	109,000 km^{2} (42,085 sq mi)	Lancaster Sound

== National Landmarks ==
The National Landmarks program was established in 1978 to protect specific natural features considered "outstanding, exceptional, unique, or rare to this country. These natural features would typically be isolated entities and of scientific interest." The enabling legislation expired 10 years later, and was not renewed. Pingo National Landmark was the only such unit established in that time.

National Landmarks
Name	Photo	Location	Established	Area (2017)	Description
Pingo		Northwest Territories; 69°24′N 133°05′W	25 July 1984	16 km^{2} (6 sq mi)	Located on the shore of the Arctic Ocean, Canada's only National Landmark preserves eight ice-cored mounds known as pingos including Canada's largest, Ibyuk Pingo, along with other land and ice formations unique to the permafrost environment.

== Provincial parks categorized as national parks ==
Provincial and territorial parks are administered and funded by their respective governments. The province of Quebec's Société des établissements de plein air du Québec (Sépaq) names its protected areas "national parks" (French: parc national). These are not part of the National Parks System administered by Parks Canada, other than Saguenay–St. Lawrence Marine Park which is co-managed by both agencies.

Some sub-national parks are categorized by the IUCN under the umbrella term national parks (Category II) in its global Protected Area Management Categories. As of 2011, there were more than 1500 Category II-listed areas across the country, including nearly 700 in B.C., and at least 500 in Ontario. Only Quebec uses the term “national park” for such provincial areas, using the IUCN's category name as justification.

In addition to the national park system, several federal agencies manage natural, scientific, and recreational areas. In the National Capital Region, a number of parklands come under the jurisdiction of the National Capital Commission, including Gatineau Park in Quebec. None of these are part of the national park system.

== See also ==
- Tourism in Canada
- List of Canadian protected areas
- List of UNESCO Biosphere Reserves in Canada
- List of national historic sites of Canada
- List of World Heritage Sites in Canada
