= Mealy =

Mealy may refer to:

- Mealy Mountains, Newfoundland and Labrador, Canada
  - Mealy Mountains National Park Reserve
- Darlene Mealy (active from 2006), American politician in New York City
- Dean Mealy (1915-1973), American basketball player.
- E. Mealy El (born Edward Mealy, 1870-1935), American religious leader
- George H. Mealy (1927-2010), American mathematician and computer scientist
  - Mealy machine, invented by George H. Mealy
- Robert Mealy (active from 2004), American performer and teacher of baroque violin
- Pangaré horse color trait (alternate name)

== See also ==
- Mealie, another name for maize
