= Akami−Uapishkᵘ−KakKasuak−Mealy Mountains National Park Reserve =

National park in Newfoundland and Labrador, Canada

- Réserve de parc national Monts Mealy
- IUCN category II (national park)
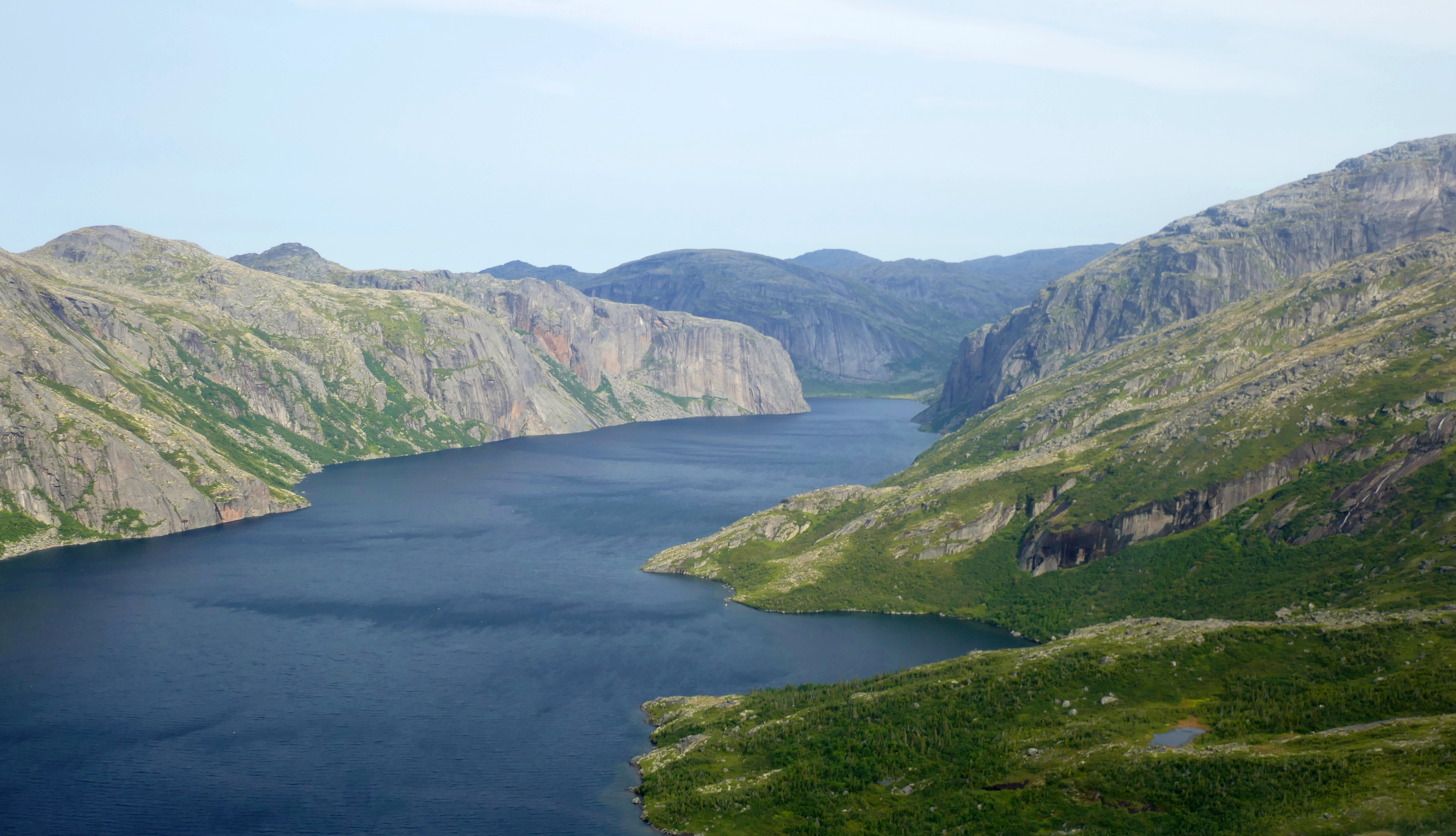
- Mealy Mountains

- Location within Canada Location within Newfoundland and Labrador
- Interactive map of Akami−Uapishkᵘ−KakKasuak−Mealy Mountains National Park Reserve
- Location: Labrador, Newfoundland and Labrador, Canada
- Nearest city: Happy Valley-Goose Bay, Labrador
- Coordinates: 53°24′00″N 59°22′00″W
- Area: 10,700 km^{2} (4,131 sq mi)
- Established: 31 July 2015
- Governing body: Parks Canada
- Website: Akami−Uapishk^{U}−KakKasuak−Mealy Mountains National Park Reserve

Akami−Uapishkᵘ−KakKasuak−Mealy Mountains National Park Reserve is a national park reserve in the Labrador region of Newfoundland and Labrador. Established in 2015, its area covers approximately 10,700 square kilometres (4,131 sq mi). Along with the Mealy Mountains, the park protects a large portion of boreal forest, tundra and more than 50 kilometres of shoreline on the Labrador Sea and Lake Melville. It is the largest national park in eastern Canada, and the largest protected area in all of eastern North America. It is inhabited by a variety of wildlife, fish and migratory birds, including the threatened Mealy Mountains woodland caribou herd, and healthy populations of wild atlantic salmon, in decline throughout its range. Other mammals that inhabit this park reserve are wolf packs, black bear, marten and two species of fox. Agreements with the indigenous peoples of the area, including the Innu, Inuit, and NunatuKavut allow for the sharing of various management and planning responsibilities, and the continuation of Indigenous rights in the protected area.

== Background ==
Parks Canada, the governing and administration body for the national park system, has developed a national systems plan identifying 39 different natural regions it aims to represent. Since the 1970s, the Innu people rejected Parks Canada's efforts in the region. However, in 2001, after concluding a framework for a land claim agreement, Innu Nation invited Parks Canada to begin conducting a feasibility study regarding whether a new park should be established in Labrador, which would represent the east coast boreal forest. A steering committee was formed, and they held a series of meetings near Lake Melville. One of the concerns brought up by the area residents regarded the "traditional land uses by Labradorians", which include "the continuing use of personal cabins, boil-ups (lunch and picnic fires), cutting wood for personal use, gathering medicinal and healing herbs, berry picking, fishing, and hunting, trapping and snaring small game".

In May 2008, the committee concluded that a park was feasible. The park began as a reserve due to unresolved land claims negotiations with Innu people in the area. A National Park Reserve is an area that has been set aside with the intention of becoming a national park, pending the settlement of land claims. Until then, they are managed as national parks under the National Parks Act.

The park was announced on February 5, 2010 by then Minister of the Environment Jim Prentice in Happy Valley-Goose Bay, Labrador. At the same time, the government of Newfoundland and Labrador announced that a proposed Provincial Waterway Park would also be created. It will be adjacent to Mealy Mountains and will protect the Eagle River watershed. Together, the two parks will protect approximately 13,000 square kilometres (5,019 sq mi). The park will be unique because it will allow for traditional Aboriginal activities not permitted in most other parks, such as hunting, trapping, fishing and cutting wood for personal use. However, further development of the land and mining will not be allowed. Larry Innes of The Canadian Boreal Initiative, who was part of the steering committee, said that "It's a change in policy which really fits the context here. The big breakthrough here is that not only are they creating the largest protected area in Eastern North America. They're doing so in a way that fits the uses that local people have put to the place".

Alex MacDonald of the conservation group Nature Canada said they had been lobbying for the establishment of the park. MacDonald said, "Protecting an area this large will maintain vast amounts of habitat — river habitats, aquatic ecosystems, the tundra habitat as well as boreal forest areas".

The federal government renewed its commitment to the park reserve in 2015, proposing "Akami−Uapishkᵘ−KakKasuak−Mealy Mountains" as the name for the country's ninth National Park Reserve. "Akami−Uapishkᵘ" is the Innu name for the area, meaning White Mountain across, while "KakKasuak" is the Labrador Inuit word for mountain. The National Park Reserve was officially established as Canada's 46th national park with the July 31, 2015 signing of a federal/provincial Land Transfer Memorandum of Agreement. The lands were officially transferred to the Canadian federal government by the province of Newfoundland and Labrador on July 10, 2017.

== See also ==
- List of national parks of Canada
