= Pingo (disambiguation) =

Pingos are intrapermafrost ice-cored hills.

Pingo may also refer to:

== People ==
- Thomas Pingo (1714–1776), English medallist and die engraver
- Pingo (footballer, born 1968), born Luís Roberto Magalhães, Brazilian football midfielder and manager
- Pingo (footballer, born 1973), born Valdecir Ribeiro da Silva, Brazilian football defensive midfielder
- Pingo (footballer, born 1980), born Erison Carlos dos Santos Silva, Brazilian football midfielder
- Pingo (footballer, born 1991), born Tarcisio Lopes da Silva, Brazilian football striker
- Pingo, the nickname given to Frederik X of Denmark (born 1968) during his military service

== Places ==
- Pingo Canadian Landmark, Canadian protected area
- El Pingo, Argentine village
- Pingo River, Chilean river
- Kadleroshilik Pingo, Alaskan pingo
- Kettle (landform), post-glacial depression known in Norfolk, United Kingdom, as a pingo pond
  - Great Eastern Pingo Trail, English footpath
- Pingo-d'Água, Brazilian municipality
- Nant Cledlyn Pingos, Welsh site of special interest

== Other ==
- Pingo, character from the TV series Pingu
- Pingo Doce, Portuguese supermarket operators
- The Isle of Pingo Pongo, 1938 cartoon film
- Gas hydrate pingo, submarine dome structure
