= Pingo Canadian Landmark =

Natural area near Tuktoyaktuk, Northwest Territories, Canada

Pingo National Landmark
- IUCN category VI (protected area with sustainable use of natural resources)
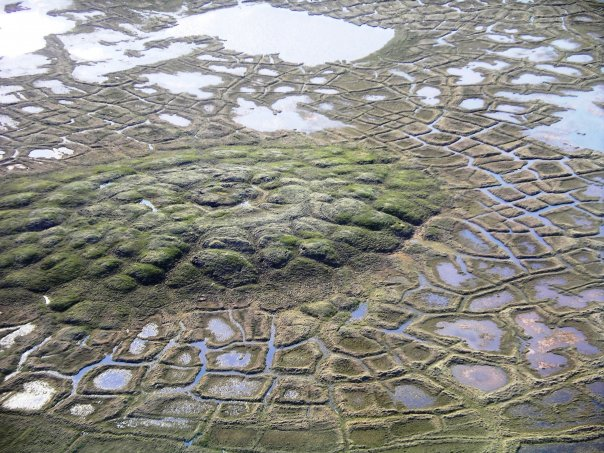
- A melting pingo with wedge ice in Pingo National Landmark

- Location within Canada Location within Northwest Territories
- Location: Northwest Territories, Canada
- Nearest city: Tuktoyaktuk, NT
- Coordinates: 69°23′59″N 133°04′47″W
- Area: 16 km^{2} (6.2 sq mi)
- Established: 25 July 1984
- Governing body: Parks Canada
- Website: www.pc.gc.ca/en/lhn-nhs/nt/pingo

Pingo Canadian Landmark, also known as Pingo National Landmark, is a natural area protecting eight pingos near Tuktoyaktuk, Northwest Territories. It is in a coastal region of the Arctic Ocean which contains approximately 1,350 Arctic ice dome hills—approximately one quarter of the world's pingos.

== History ==
The area has been a focus of scientific study for over 50 years, and research here has formed the basis of current understanding about the origin and growth of pingos. The region was first identified as a site of national significance in 1978, and landmark status was proposed. Legislation creating it in 1984 formed part of the Inuvialuit Final Agreement (officially, the Western Arctic (Inuvialuit) Claims Settlement Act (1984)). It provided for cooperative management of the Landmark between the Government of Canada, the Inuvialuit Land Administration, and the people of Tuktoyaktuk. It reserved subsurface rights for the Inuvialuit, federal jurisdiction for the surface, and that the pingos would be preserved unimpaired.

Although a nationwide landmarks program was envisioned at its creation, Pingo remains the country's only National Landmark.

== Geography ==
The Landmark comprises an area roughly 16 km^{2} (6.2 sq mi), just 5 km (3.1 mi) west of Tuktoyaktuk, and includes Ibyuk Pingo—Canada's highest, exceeded in height only by Kadleroshilik Pingo in Alaska—at 49 m (161 ft). The Landmark, which lies within the Inuvialuit Settlement Region, is managed by Parks Canada under the National Parks Act.

In a region near the Beaufort Sea which is quite flat, pingos dominate the skyline, rising from 5 to 36 m (16 to 118 ft), in various stages of growth and collapse. Ibyuk Pingo, the highest, continues to grow about 2 cm (0.79 in) per year, and is estimated to be at least 1,000 years old. Unique to areas of permafrost, pingos have formed here thanks to numerous lakes in the Tuktoyaktuk Peninsula.

== Geology ==
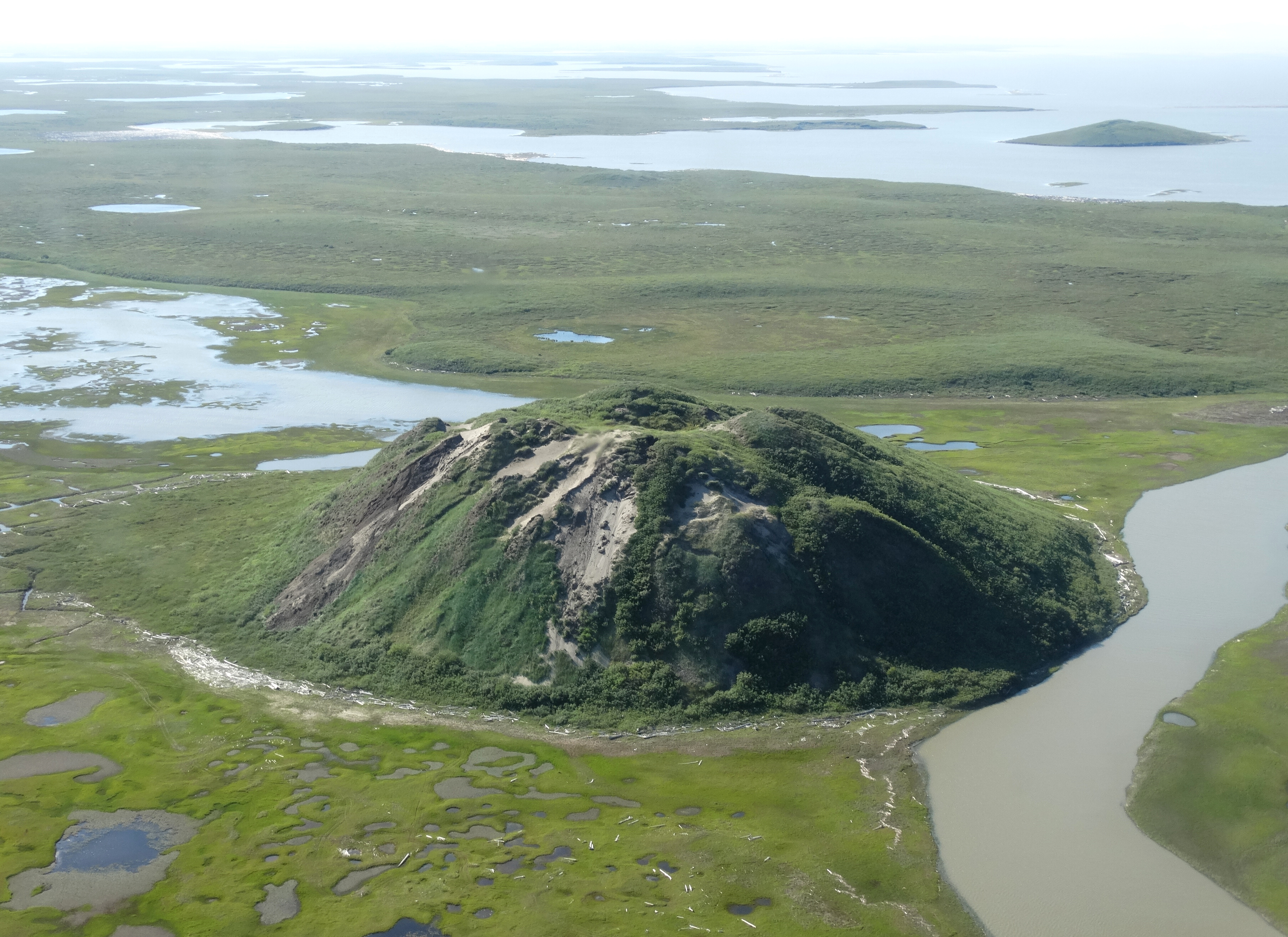
Ibyuk, the largest pingo in Canada and the second largest in the world after Kadleroshilik Pingo in Alaska

=== Pingos ===
The Tuktoyaktuk Peninsula also known as Mackenzie Delta, has the greatest concentration of pingos in the world with a total of 1,350 pingos. These pingos formed in one of two distinct ways: hydrostatically and hydraulically. Hydrostatic pingos are the result of closed systems caused by continuous permafrost where there is an impermeable ground layer, leading to the build up of hydrostatic pressure. Hydraulic pingos are caused by open systems where groundwater flows in, leading to the accumulation of artesian pressure. Parks Canada has designated an area of 8 Pingos as a protected site.

=== Other features ===
The Landmark protects an excellent example of massive ice. One section of the frozen groundwater, part of an eroded hillside by the sea, is over 500 m (1,600 ft) long, and 10 m (33 ft) high. Other less visible ice beds in the region are over 40 m (130 ft) thick. This type of ice is found in permafrost, and can be thousands of years old.

The permafrost environment of the Landmark also hosts wedge ice. These are vertical masses of ice that form after water freezes in the cracks around ground that has contracted due to extreme cold. When ice wedges connect to one another, they can form tundra polygons. These polygons are most striking when viewed from the air.

== Ecology ==
=== Flora ===
There are an estimated 1200 different plant species that can be found at the park. Shrubs that can be found include arctic willow, white heather, Labrador tea, and dwarf birch. Several different berries such as cranberries, cloudberries, and blueberries can be found in the park. Non-vascular plants such as sphagnum moss and leaf lichen make up much of the ground cover in the region. As a result of the permafrost and short growing season of the park what few trees can be found are in a stunted krummholz form.

=== Fauna ===
Animals that inhabit this park include grizzly and polar bears, wolf packs, two species of fox, and Arctic ground squirrels. Birds that either nest or migrate around the park are brant geese, tundra swans, lesser snow geese, loons, and greater white-fronted geese. Ducks such as mallard, green-winged teal, king eider, common eider, and long-tailed ducks are common to this area as well as a variety of gulls and shorebird species.

== Visiting the Landmark ==
In August 2010 a boardwalk trail was completed with a boat launch, dock and viewing platforms; interpretive signage is planned by Parks Canada for self-guided tours. Local tour operators provide guided access to the site, which is easiest by boat. Hiking provides a more challenging option, but no matter how visitors access the site, Arctic weather and varying water levels can force a change of plans and an alternate route of return.

== In media ==
The landmark was featured in Billy Connolly: Journey to the Edge of the World, a 2008 transcontinental land, sea, and air journey by the Scottish entertainer.

== See also ==
- List of national parks of Canada
