= Rocky Mountains Park Act =

1887 Canadian law establishing Banff National Park

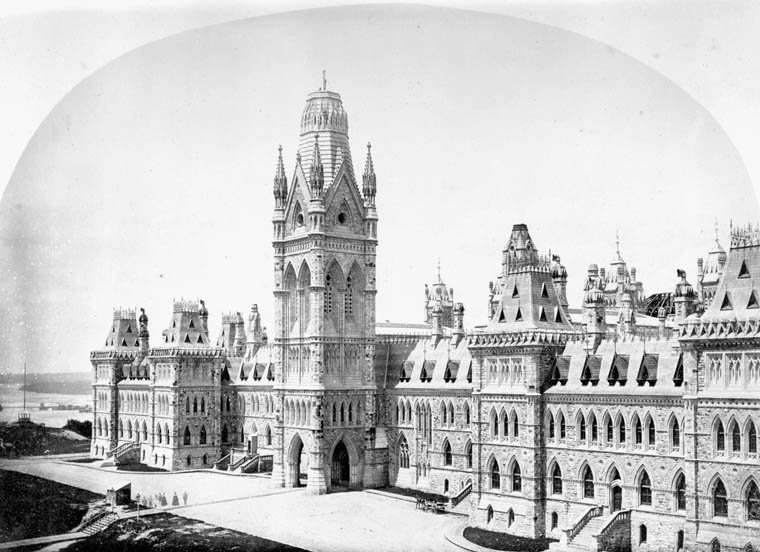

Parliament of Canada
- Long title: An Act Respecting the Rocky Mountains Park of Canada
- Citation: 50 & 51 Victoria, c. 32
- Enacted by: Parliament of Canada
- Assented to: June 23, 1887; 139 years ago

The Rocky Mountains Park Act (French: Loi sur le parc des montagnes Rocheuses) was enacted on June 23, 1887, by the Parliament of Canada, establishing Banff National Park which was then known as "Rocky Mountains Park". The act was modelled on the Yellowstone National Park Protection Act passed by the United States Congress in 1872. The Rocky Mountains Park Act outlined the national park concept, balancing conservation and development interests within the park.

== Background ==
The origins of the Rocky Mountains Park Act lay in the rapid development of western Canada during the 1880s. Following the completion of the Canadian Pacific Railway through the Rocky Mountains, federal officials and railway promoters increasingly viewed the region’s scenery, mineral springs, and recreational opportunities as assets that could attract tourists and settlers. In 1883, workers associated with the Canadian Pacific Railway discovered a series of hot mineral springs on the slopes of Sulphur Mountain near present-day Banff. Competing claims to ownership of the springs soon prompted federal intervention, leading the Government of Canada to reserve the area for public purposes in 1885 as the Banff Hot Springs Reserve. As interest in the region grew, Canadian policymakers looked to emerging conservation practices in the United States, particularly the establishment of Yellowstone National Park in 1872. The resulting legislation, enacted in 1887 as the Rocky Mountains Park Act, sought to preserve the area’s natural attractions while also encouraging tourism and economic development, establishing a model that would influence the future development of Canada’s national park system.

== Provisions ==
The act established Rocky Mountains Park as a federally administered reserve and provided the legal framework for its management. The legislation sought to protect the area's natural features while permitting public access and development associated with tourism and recreation.

== Legacy ==
The Rocky Mountains Park Act is regarded as the foundation of Canada's national park system. Rocky Mountains Park was subsequently expanded and renamed Banff National Park, becoming the first national park in Canada and one of the earliest national parks in the world.

== See also ==
- Banff National Park
- Canada National Parks Act
- Parks Canada
