= Pinga =

Pinga may refer to:

== People ==
=== Footballers ===
- Pinga (footballer, born 1924) (José Lázaro Robles, 1924–1996), Brazilian football midfielder
- Pinga (footballer, born 1965) (Jorge Luis da Silva Brum), Brazilian football defender
- Pinga (footballer, born 1981) (André Luciano da Silva), Brazilian football attacking midfielder
- Aimery Pinga (born 1998), Swiss footballer
- Artur Pinga (Artur de Sousa, 1909–1963), Portuguese footballer
- Arnaldo Robles (1921–2015), also known as Pinga Fogo or Pinga II, Brazilian football midfielder

=== Other people ===
- Michael Pinga (born 1963), American politician from Rhode Island
- Tootsie Guevarra (born Emma Theresa Pinga, 1980), Filipino recording artist and actress

== Other uses ==
- Pinga, Democratic Republic of the Congo, a village
- Pinga (goddess), in the Inuit religion
- Pinga, the younger sister of the title character of Pingu
- "Pinga", a song from the soundtrack of Bollywood movie Bajirao Mastani
- Pingas, a slang term for MDMA
- Cachaça, or Pinga, a distilled spirit made from fermented sugarcane juice

== See also ==
- Pingo (disambiguation)
- Pinga marginata, a genus of flowering plants
