= Mount Harkin =

Mountain in the country of Canada

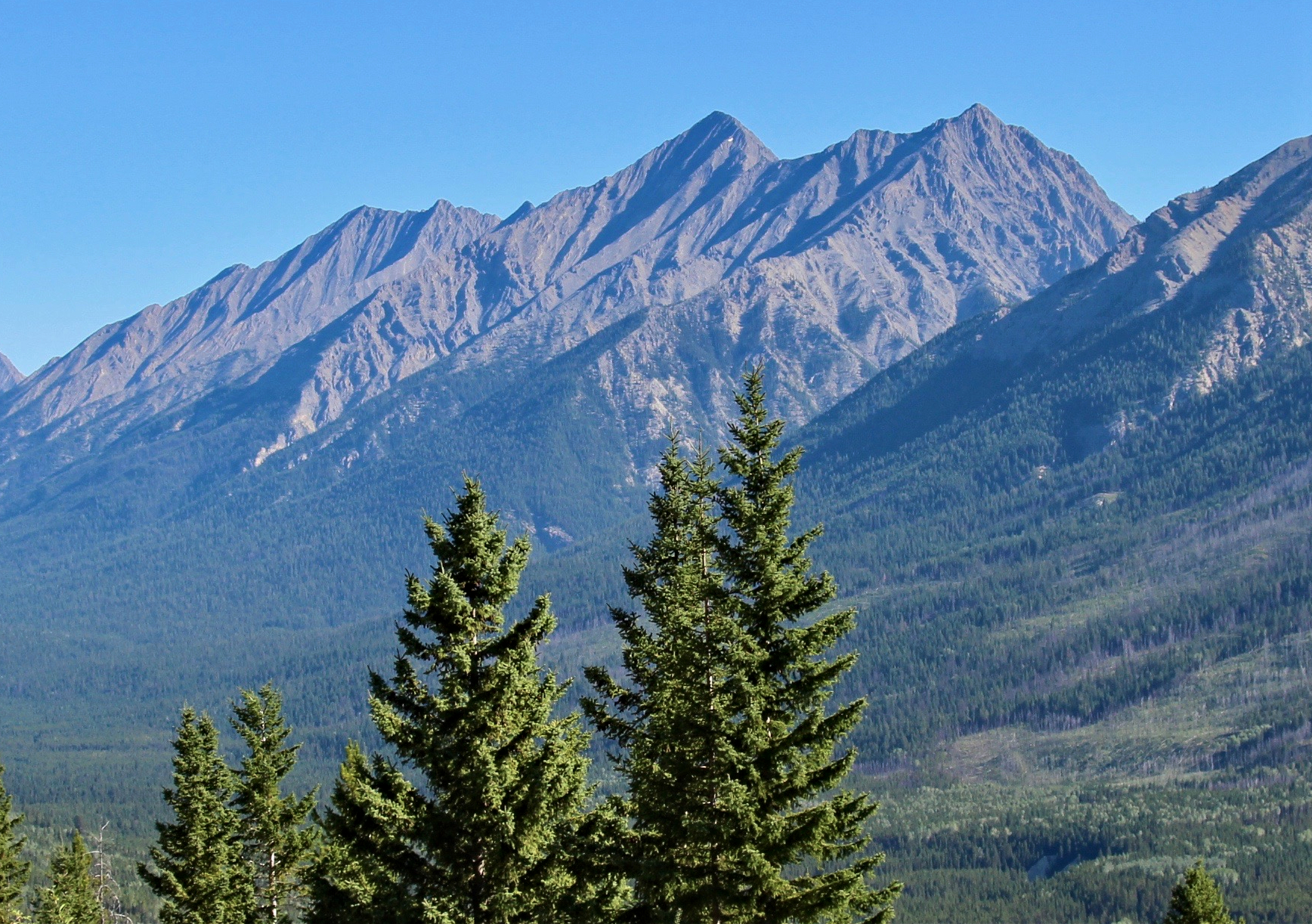
- Mount Harkin seen from Kootenay Valley Overlook along Highway 93

Highest point
- Elevation: 2,979 m (9,774 ft)
- Prominence: 774 m (2,539 ft)
- Parent peak: Mount Assiniboine (3618 m)
- Listing: Mountains of British Columbia
- Coordinates: 50°47′49″N 115°51′52″W

Geography
- Location within British Columbia Location within Canada
- Interactive map of Mount Harkin
- Location: Kootenay National Park; British Columbia, Canada
- District: Kootenay Land District
- Parent range: Mitchell Range; Canadian Rockies
- Topo map: NTS 82J13 Mount Assiniboine

Geology
- Rock age: Cambrian
- Rock type: Ottertail Limestone

Mount Harkin is a 2,979-metre (9,774-foot) mountain summit located in the Kootenay River Valley along the eastern border of Kootenay National Park. Park visitors can see the peak from Highway 93, also known as the Banff–Windermere Highway. It is part of the Mitchell Range, which is a sub-range of the Canadian Rockies of British Columbia, Canada. Its nearest higher peak is Mount Assiniboine, 14.0 km (8.7 mi) to the northeast.

== History ==
The mountain was named in 1923 by Morrison P. Bridgland in honor of James Bernard Harkin (1875–1955), who was Canada's first National Parks commissioner from 1911 until 1936. Harkin established 11 new national parks and has been called the "Father of the National Parks of Canada." The mountain's name was officially adopted in 1924 by the Geographical Names Board of Canada. Bridgland (1878–1948) was a Dominion Land Surveyor who named many peaks in the Canadian Rockies.

== Geology ==
Mount Harkin is composed principally of Ottertail limestone, a sedimentary rock laid down during the Precambrian to Cambrian periods and pushed east and over the top of younger rock during the Laramide orogeny.

== Climate ==
Based on the Köppen climate classification, Mount Harkin is located in a subarctic climate zone with cold, snowy winters, and mild summers. Winter temperatures can drop below −20 °C with wind chill factors below −30 °C. Precipitation runoff from the mountain drains east into tributaries of the Cross River, or directly west to the Kootenay River.

== See also ==
- Geology of the Rocky Mountains
- Geography of British Columbia
