= Menissawok National Park =

Former national park in Saskatchewan, Canada

Coordinates: 49.772414°N 109.449586°W

- Interactive map of Menissawok National Park
- Type: Former national park
- Nearest town: Maple Creek, Saskatchewan
- Area: 44 square kilometres (17 sq mi)
- Opened: 1922
- Closed: May 30, 1930

Menissawok National Park was a national park established in 1922 southeast of the town of Maple Creek, Saskatchewan, in the southwest part of the Canadian province. It closed in 1930, and was delisted in 1947. The 44 km^{2} (17 sq mi) park land had functioned as a pronghorn reserve beginning in 1914.

Menissawok National Park was one of several national parks created in the Prairies expressly to protect and regenerate dangerously low populations of bison and pronghorn. Other 'regeneration' parks, also delisted in 1947, included Buffalo National Park, Wawaskesy National Park, and Nemiskam National Park (all in Alberta).

Menissawok is a Cree First Nations word meaning "common or national property" (the nearest Cree term for "national park"). The area was one of three pronghorn reserves in Saskatchewan, along with the Old Wives Lake reserve, 24 km (15 mi) southwest of Moose Jaw, and the temporary Big Stick Lake reserve, in the same region as Menissawok.

With the rebound of pronghorn herds in southern Saskatchewan and Alberta, Menissawok and several other small "Dominion Parks" were closed when the National Parks Act was updated on May 30, 1930. The land comprising Menissawok National Park was turned over to the province of Saskatchewan. While human activity has returned, areas along waterways are covered by trees.
