= Kadleroshilik River =

River in Alaska, United States

- Location in Alaska

Location
- Country: United States
- State: Alaska
- Borough: North Slope Borough

Physical characteristics
- Source
  - location: East of Sagwon, Alaska
  - coordinates: 69°21′38″N 147°33′33″W
- Mouth
  - location: Beaufort Sea (Arctic Ocean)
  - coordinates: 70°12′26″N 147°36′27″W
  - elevation: 0 ft
- Length: 65 mi (104 km)
- Basin size: 500 sq mi (1,290 km^{2})

The Kadleroshilik River is a 65-mile-long (104 km) stream in the North Slope Borough of the U.S. state of Alaska. Flowing south to north, it empties into Foggy Island Bay in the Beaufort Sea, about 20 miles (32 km) east of Prudhoe Bay. It was named by Ernest de Koven Leffingwell for the nearby Kadleroshilik Pingo, the highest known pingo in the world, which Leffingwell also named.

A fish study conducted by the Alaska Department of Fish and Game in 1995 reported Arctic grayling (Thymallus arcticus), Dolly Varden trout (Salvelinus malma), and ninespine stickleback (Pungitius pungitius) in the river. An earlier study had also reported the presence of slimy sculpin (Cottus cognatus).
