= National Landmarks (Canada) =

Type of natural protected area in Canada

Canadian Landmark
- Location: Canada
- Area: Varies
- Designation: Proposed protected area system
- Established: 1970s–1980s (concept)
- Named for: Outstanding natural features
- Governing body: Government of Canada

A Canadian Landmark is a type of protected area in Canada.

In the 1970s and 1980s, the Government of Canada envisioned establishing a system of Canadian Landmarks in order to protect natural features considered to be "outstanding, exceptional, unique, or rare" in Canada. Such features would typically be isolated entities of scientific interest.

Only one landmark has been established—Pingo Canadian Landmark—in the Northwest Territories. Another was proposed at the same time (1984)—Nelson Head Canadian Landmark—on the southern tip of Banks Island, also in the Northwest Territories. It was to include some 180 km^{2} (70 sq mi), 40 km (25 mi) of coastline, and protect the sea cliffs at Nelson Head and Cape Lambton. Durham Heights were to be included, which reach an elevation of 747 m (2,450 ft). The legislation providing for the Landmark required a formal request be made by the Minister of the Environment within 10 years (until 1994). None was ever made.

== See also ==
- Protected areas of Canada
- List of national parks of Canada
