= Wawaskesy National Park =

Former national park in Alberta, Canada

- Interactive map of Wawaskesy National Park
- Location: Alberta, Canada
- Nearest city: Medicine Hat
- Coordinates: 50°28′34″N 110°27′18″W
- Established: 1922, Delisted 1947

Wawaskesy National Park was created north and west of the South Saskatchewan River, north of the city of Medicine Hat in southeastern Alberta, Canada, on May 31, 1922. It was closed on June 24, 1938, and delisted in 1947.

Beginning in 1915 the 65 km^{2} (25 sq mi) of land that formed Wawaskesy National Park had been designated the Canyon Antelope Reserve, to protect pronghorn (sometimes referred to as antelope). The area was one of many pronghorn reserves created in Alberta and Saskatchewan at that time.

Wawaskesy National Park was one of several national parks created in the Canadian Prairies expressly to protect and regenerate dangerously low populations of bison and pronghorn. Other 'regeneration' parks, also delisted on July 17, 1947, included Buffalo National Park and Nemiskam National Park (both in Alberta) and Menissawok National Park in Saskatchewan.

Wawaskesy is a Cree word for antelope.

With the rebound of pronghorn herds in southern Saskatchewan and Alberta, Wawaskesy was closed in 1938 and title to lands in Wawaskesy National Park automatically reverted to Alberta, in accordance with provisions of the Alberta Natural Resources Act of 1930 and the land was used by area farmers. In 1941 the land was transferred to Canada and included in the Suffield Block for military use. On the 19 June 2003, a portion of the Suffield Block, including areas formerly within Wawaskesy National Park, were designated the Suffield National Wildlife Area.
