= Parks Canada =

Canadian government agency

Parks Canada Agency
- Agence Parcs Canada
- The Parks Canada Agency beaver logo, first used in 1933 and last updated in 2023

Agency overview
- Formed: May 19, 1911; 115 years ago
- Jurisdiction: Government of Canada
- Headquarters: Gatineau, Quebec, Canada
- Employees: 4,666 (March 2021)
- Annual budget: CA$1.3 billion (2020–21)
- Minister responsible: Julie Dabrusin, Minister of the Environment, Climate Change and Nature
- Website: parks.canada.ca

Parks Canada (French: Parcs Canada) (Note: Parks Canada is the applied title under the Federal Identity Program; the legal title is Parks Canada Agency (French: Agence Parcs Canada).) is the agency of the Government of Canada which manages the country's 37 National Parks, 11 national park reserves, 5 National Marine Conservation Areas, 171 National Historic Sites, one National Urban Park (Rouge), and one National Landmark (Pingo). Parks Canada is mandated to "protect and present nationally significant examples of Canada's natural and cultural heritage, and foster public understanding, appreciation, and enjoyment in ways that ensure their ecological and commemorative integrity for present and future generations".

The agency also administers lands and waters set aside as potential national parklands, including ten National Park Reserves and one National Marine Conservation Area Reserve. More than 450,000 km^{2} (170,000 mi^{2}) of lands and waters in national parks and national marine conservation areas has been set aside for such purposes. Parks Canada cooperatively manages a large majority of their protected areas and heritage sites with Indigenous partners. The Canadian Register of Historic Places is supported and managed by the agency, in collaboration with provincial and territorial governments and other federal bodies. The agency is also the working arm of the national Historic Sites and Monuments Board, which recommends National Historic Sites, Events, and Persons.

The minister of the environment, climate change and nature (Julie Dabrusin since 2025) is responsible for the agency, and it is managed by its chief executive officer (Ron Hallman since 2019). The agency's budget was CA$1.3 billion in the 2020–2021 fiscal year and it employed 4,666 public servants in March 2021.

== History ==
Parks Canada was established on May 19, 1911, as the Dominion Parks Branch under the Department of the Interior, becoming the world's first national park service. Since its creation, its name has changed, known variously as the Dominion Parks Branch, National Parks Branch, Parks Canada, Environment Canada – Parks Branch, and the Canadian Parks Service, before a return to Parks Canada in 1998. The service's activities are regulated under legislation such as the Canada National Parks Act, and the Parks Canada Agency Act, which established the current legal incorporation of the agency in 1998.

To mark the 150th anniversary of Confederation in 2017, Parks Canada offered free passes to national parks and national historic sites for the year.

== Activities ==
=== Public safety and enforcement ===
A Parks Canada Park Warden badge.

Park Wardens protect natural and cultural resources by conducting patrols of National Parks, National Historic sites and National Marine Conservation Areas. They ensure the safety of staff, visitors and residents, and conduct strategic enforcement activities aimed at public peace maintenance, resource protection, visitor enjoyment and administrative compliance. They are designated under section 18 of the Canada National Parks Act as Park Wardens and are peace officers as defined by the Criminal Code. They carry firearms and non-lethal intervention options.

The minister may also designate provincial and local enforcement officers under section 19 of the Act for the purpose of enforcing laws within the specified parks. These officers have the power of peace officers only in relation to the Act.

In May 2012, it was reported that Park Wardens may be cross designated to enforce certain wildlife acts administered by Environment Canada. Should the designations go ahead it would only be for Park Wardens that are stationed near existing migratory bird sanctuaries.

Essentially the intent of the change is to allow for a faster and lower-cost response to environmental enforcement incidents, particularly in remote areas in the north where Environment Canada does not have an ongoing presence, but Parks Canada has a Park Warden nearby who could act on its behalf, rather than have Environment Canada responded from a farther office.

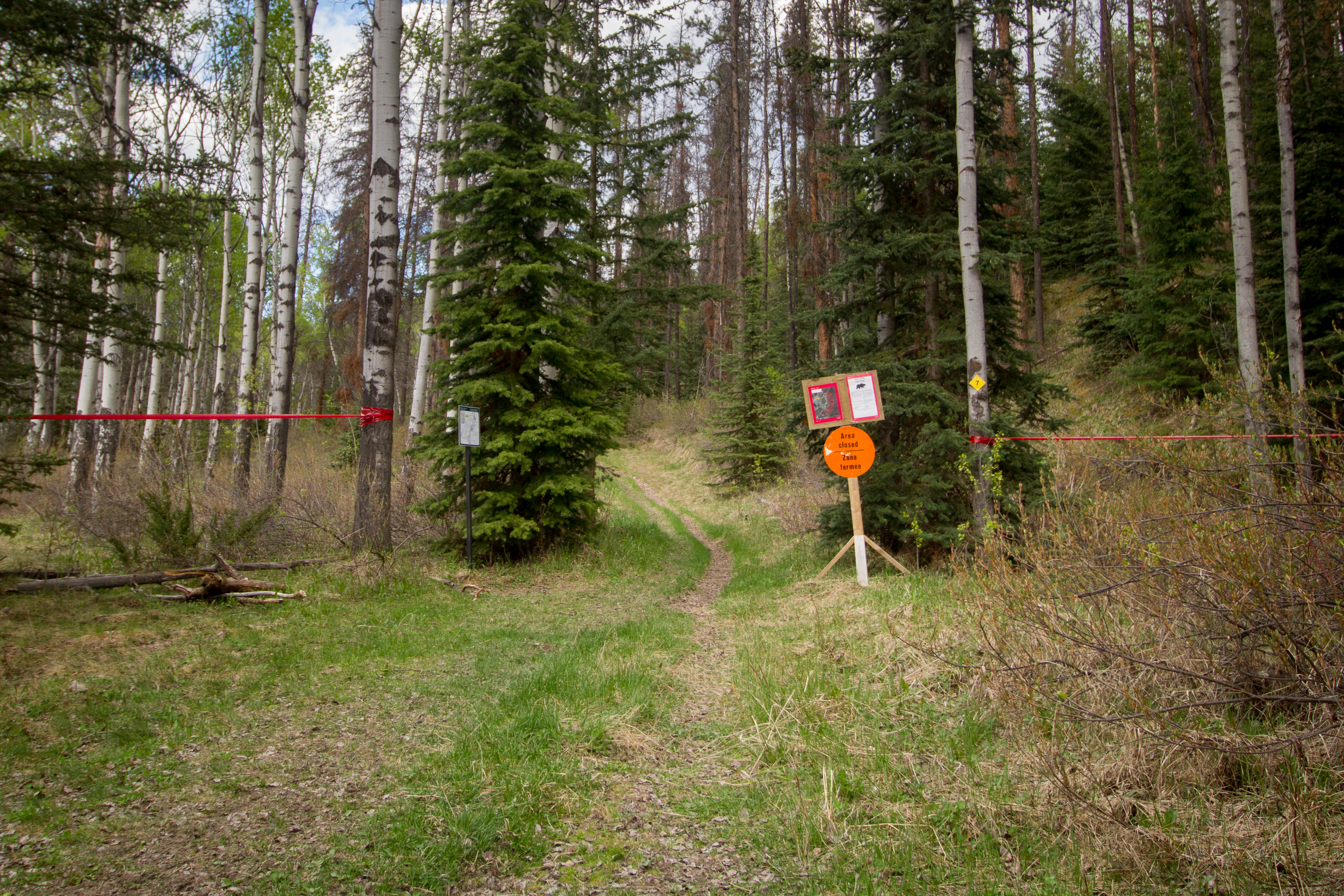
Park Wardens close off an area of Jasper National Park.

=== Ecological integrity monitoring ===
According to the Panel on Ecological Integrity Report in 2000, "the idea of conserving nature unimpaired has been part of national parks' legal mandate since 1930". The term “ecological integrity” was put into the 1988 amendments to the National Parks Act but was in park policy as early as 1979. The Panel on Ecological Integrity Report proposed the following definition: "An ecosystem has integrity when it is deemed characteristic for its natural region, including the composition and abundance of native species and biological communities, rates of change and supporting processes." There is a significant amount of debate surrounding the definition of ecological integrity. As can be seen through the evolution of the term, ecological integrity is deeply rooted in notions of symbiosis, sustainability, and holistic management practices. There is a fair amount of debate surrounding the definition of the term in the academic world as well. For example, "[ecological integrity] has a high degree of linguistic elasticity and should there ever be a legal challenge to its use, there are no precise and clear definitions for it." Regardless of the fluidity of the term, there are some common elements, "There are, however, certain common elements found in many definitions: naturalness, wholeness, continuity through time."

According to the most recent iteration of the Canada National Parks Act S.C. 2000, c.32., Parks Canada is responsible for the ecological integrity of all national parks. To cite section 8 (2): “Maintenance or restoration of ecological integrity through the protection of natural resources and natural processes, shall be the first priority of the Minister when considering all aspects of the management of park" (Canada National Parks Act, 2000). This law put additional onus on Parks Canada Agency to implement a robust science-based conservation and monitoring program.

Following the publication of the Panel on Ecological Integrity Report in 2000, Parks Canada Agency released Status on Agency Progress since First Priority in 2008 as a response. One major stride mentioned is the implementation of a policy requirement for national parks to report on the state of ecological integrity every five years, summarizing reports from monitoring programs in place. This State of the Park report was designed to ensure accountability in the management structure of Parks Canada Agency. In the author's words, “The State of the Park report is the accountability mechanism for Field Unit Superintendents to report to the CEO on achieving the Agency's Corporate Plan performance expectations related to maintaining and improving ecological integrity." In addition to this reform, Parks Canada also updated and released the Agency's Guide to Management Planning in 2008 to restructure the agency and ensure that this new integrated approach could be applied to all national parks.

With these changes, Parks Canada formally began monitoring for ecological integrity in 2008 and is ongoing to date. These modifications are consistent with the Office of the Auditor General of Canada's observations in the 2005 report of the Commissioner of the Environment and Sustainable Development. For example, “The 6 to 8 ecological integrity indicators for each national park measure the health of Canada's national parks by reporting on the indicator's condition and trend (improving, stable or declining) over time”. This ecological integrity monitoring program summarizes the state of a park's ecological integrity using “good, fair, poor”. Parks Canada's ecological integrity monitoring program is based on three publications: Monitoring and Reporting Ecological Integrity in Canada's National Parks Volume I: Guiding Principles (2005) and the compendium document, Volume 2: A Park-Level Guide to Establishing EI Monitoring (2007), Consolidated Guidelines for Ecological Integrity Monitoring in Canada's National Parks (2011).

The most recent iteration of guidelines for ecological integrity monitoring, Consolidated Guidelines for Ecological Integrity Monitoring in Canada's National Parks, is significantly more robust and science based. Some of the notable improvements include the integration of a trend variable designed to demonstrate whether the indicator is deteriorating, stable or improving. In addition, the inclusion of quantitative thresholds to determine the state of indicator will allow for more accurate results. Lastly, the incorporation of an Iceberg Model for EI Indicator provides a more holistic approach, fostering increasingly complete results.

One of Parks Canada's most recent publications, Canadian Environmental Sustainability Indicators: Ecological integrity of national parks (2018), demonstrates how effective Parks Canada's recent efforts have been. More exhaustive science-based methodology allows for more precise results and ultimately, better management. This document, and all results, are based on the assessment of 118 ecosystems throughout 42 national parks across Canada. Parks Canada Agency claims that 68 per cent of parks sampled are in good condition, 20 per cent fair, 17 per cent poor. Furthermore, of the 118 ecosystems sampled, 69 per cent are stable, 19.5 per cent are improving and 12 per cent are declining, according to Canadian Environmental Sustainability Indicators: Ecological integrity of national parks. This is a notable improvement, considering that in 2000, 54 per cent of parks were suffering some form of major or severe ecological stresses. In 2018, there are 12 ecosystems rated as poor, 20 EI indicators in decline, particularly forests and freshwater environments.

=== Parka (mascot) ===
Parka, a female beaver, is Parks Canada's mascot. A series of animated shorts starring her are hosted on the organization's website and have also been aired on television as interstitials.

== Organization ==
The Parks Canada Agency was established as a separate service entity in 1998 and falls under the responsibility of Environment and Climate Change Canada. Before 2003, Parks Canada (under various names) fell under the jurisdiction of the Department of Canadian Heritage, where it had been since 1994. From 1979 to 1994, Parks Canada was part of the Department of Environment, and before it was part of the Department of Indian and Northern Affairs (1966 to 1978), and the Department of the Interior. With the organizational shifts and political leadership in Canada, the priorities of Parks Canada have shifted over the years more towards conservation and away from development. Starting in the 1960s, Parks Canada has also moved to decentralize its operations.

Heads of Parks Canada
Name	Term
J. B. Harkin	1911–1936
Frank Williamson	1936–1941
James Smart	1941–1953
J. A. Hutchison	1953–1957
J. K. B. Coleman	1957–1968
Jack Nicol	1968–1978
Al Davidson	1978–1985
J. D. Collinson	1985–1990
A. Lefebvre-Anglin	1990–1993
Tom Lee	1993–2002
Alan Latourelle	2002–2015
Daniel Watson	2015–2018
Michael Nadler	2018–2019
Ron Hallman	2019–present

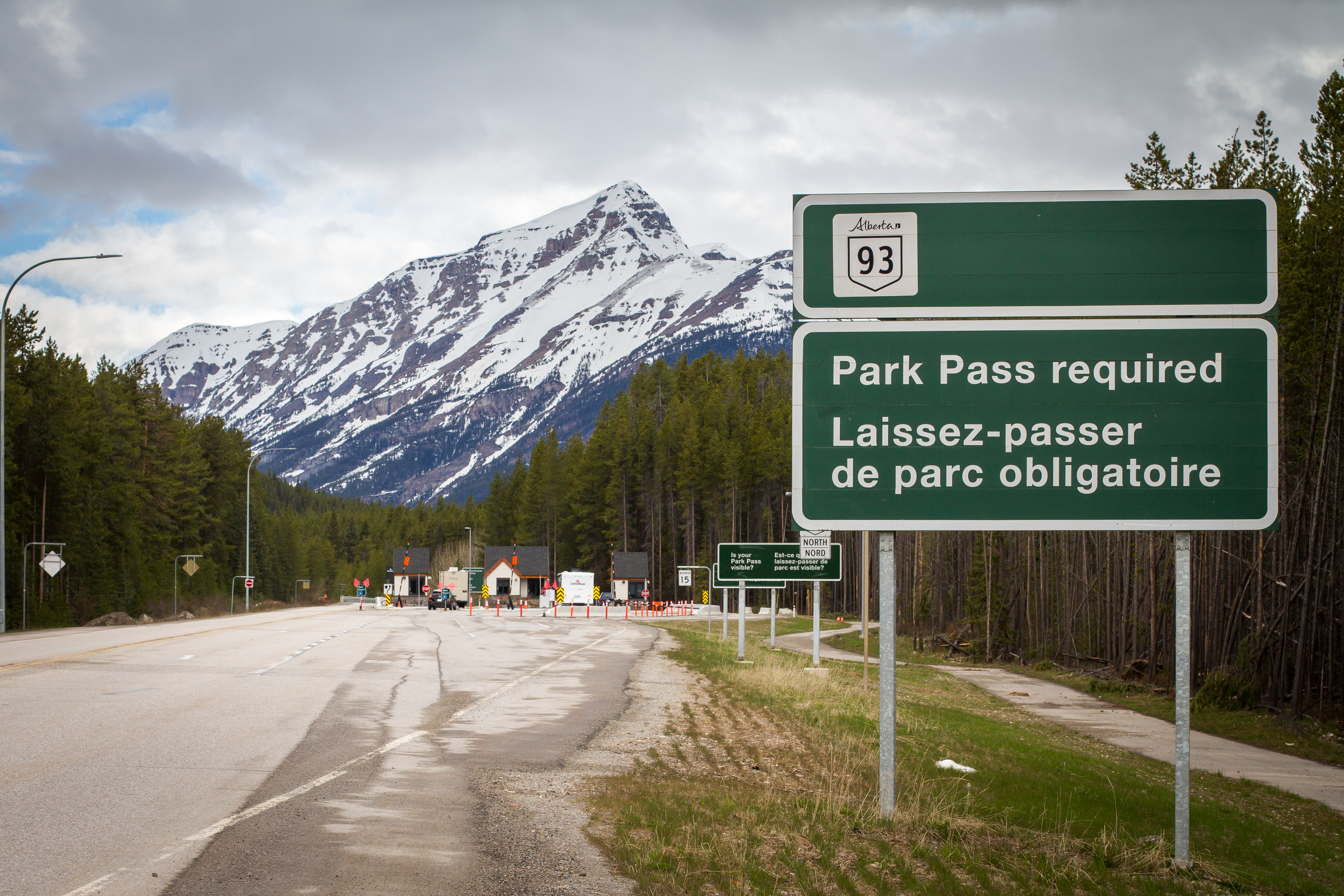
A sign at the park gates on the Icefields Parkway (Highway 93) advises tourists that they need to buy a pass to enter Jasper National Park in Alberta, Canada. Revenue collected from Park Passes goes to Parks Canada and helps fund the management of Canada's national parks.

== Legislation, regulations and boards ==
- Parks Canada Agency Act (S.C. 1998, c. 31);
- Heritage Lighthouse Protection Act (S.C. 2008, c. 16);
- Historic Sites and Monuments Act (R.S.C., 1985, c. H-4), which empowers the Historic Sites and Monuments Board of Canada to advise the Environment Minister on the designation of National Historic Sites, National Historic Events, and National Historic Persons
- Heritage Railway Stations Protection Act (R.S.C., 1985, c. 52), which makes such structures fall under the Historic Sites and Monuments Board;
- Canadian Heritage Rivers System, which is defined under the Parks Canada Agency Act, and which governs
  - 37 Canadian Heritage Rivers
- Canada National Marine Conservation Areas Act, which governs National Marine Conservation Areas
- Canada National Parks Act, which creates National Parks. See also the List of National Parks of Canada
- Laurier House Act, R.S.C. 1952, c. 163
- Saguenay-St. Lawrence Marine Park Act
- Historic Canals Regulations, which governs the
  - Rideau Canal including the Tay Canal;
  - Trent-Severn Waterway including the
  - Murray Canal, which runs between Lake Ontario and the Bay of Quinte;
  - Sault Ste. Marie Canal;
  - Saint-Ours Canal;
  - Chambly Canal;
  - Sainte-Anne-de-Bellevue Canal;
  - Carillon Canal;
  - Lachine Canal;
  - St. Peters Canal.

The Department of Canadian Heritage, which runs federal Museums, and heritage and cultural programming, falls under the control of the Minister of Canadian Heritage.

== See also ==
- National Park Service
- Ontario Parks
- Pingo National Landmark
- Sépaq

== Bibliography ==
- Campbell, Claire Elizabeth, ed. Century of Parks Canada, 1911–2011 (University of Calgary Press, 2011), 447pp; essays by experts that trace the history of the agency
- Hildebrandt, Walter. Historical Analysis of Parks Canada and Banff National Park, 1968–1995 (1995)
- List of legislation for which Parks Canada is responsible
- Lothian, W.F. "A History of Canada's National Parks" Volumes I-IV (Ottawa: Parks Canada, 1976–1986)
- Lothian, W.F. "A Brief History of Canada's National Parks" (Ottawa: Environment Canada, 1987)
- Lothian, W.F. "Histoire des parcs nationaux du Canada" Volumes I-IV (Ottawa: Parcs Canada, 1977–1983)
- Lothian, W.F. "Petite histoire des parcs nationaux du Canada" (Ottawa: Environment Canada, 1987)
- Unimpaired for future generations? Volume I, A call to action : conserving ecological integrity with Canada's national parks / [issued by] the Panel on the Ecological Integrity of Canada's National Parks. Ottawa, Canada : The Panel, R62-323/2000-1E-IN. Panel on the Ecological Integrity of Canada's National Parks, Parks Canada (2000)
- Unimpaired for future generations? Volume II, Setting a new direction for Canada's national parks : conserving ecological integrity with Canada's national parks / Panel on the Ecological Integrity of Canada's National Parks. Ottawa, Canada : The Panel, c2000. R62-323/2000-2E-IN. Panel on the Ecological Integrity of Canada's National Parks, Parks Canada (2000)
- Status On Agency Progress since First Priority, Parks Canada (2008)
- Consolidated Guidelines for Ecological Integrity Monitoring in Canada's National Parks. Protected Areas Establishment and Conservation Branch, Parks Canada (2011)
- Report of the Commissioner of the Environment and Sustainable Development to the House of Commons, 2005. Ottawa: Office of the Auditor General (2005)
- Canadian Environmental Sustainability Indicators: Ecological integrity of national parks, Environment and Climate Change Canada (2018)
- Canada National Parks Act S.C. 2000, c.32
- Bridgewater, P., Kim, R. E., & Bosselmann, K. (2014). Ecological integrity: A relevant concept for international environmental law in the Anthropocene? Yearbook of International Environmental Law, 25(1), 61–78. doi:10.1093/yiel/yvv059
- Faber‐Langendoen, D., Nichols, W., Rocchio, J., Walz, K., & Lemly, J. (2016). An introduction to NatureServe's ecological integrity assessment method (p. 33). Arlington, VA: NatureServe.
- Haight, J., & Hammill, E. (2020). Protected areas as potential refugia for biodiversity under climatic change. Biological Conservation, 241, 108258. doi:10.1016/j.biocon.2019.108258
- Halvorson, W. L., Woodley, S., Kay, J., & Francis, G. (1997). Ecological Integrity and the Management of Ecosystems. Estuaries, 20(1), 249. doi:10.2307/1352734
- Hannigan, J. (2018). Pacific Rim National Park Reserve's Pacific Traverse Trail: Exploring Parks Canada's Environmental Impact Assessment Process (Master's thesis, Royal Roads University Victoria, British Columbia, Canada, 2018). Ann Arbor: ProQuest.
- Jackson, S. T. (2006). Vegetation, environment, and time: The origination and termination of ecosystems. Journal of Vegetation Science, 17(5), 549– 557.
- Karr, J. R. (1996). Ecological integrity and ecological health are not the same. Engineering within Ecological Constraints, 97, 109.
- Karr, J. R. (2000). Health, integrity, and biological assessment: The importance of measuring whole things. In Ecological integrity: Integrating environment, conservation, and health (Vol. 209). Washington, DC: Island Press.
- Kay, J. J. (1993). On the nature of ecological integrity: Some closing comments. Ecological integrity and the management of. Ecosystems, 201, 210.
- Keenelyside, K., Dudley, N., Cairns, S., Hall, C., & Stolton, S. (2012). Ecological restoration for protected areas: principles, guidelines and best practices (Vol. 18). IUCN.
- Mortimer-Sandilands, C. (2009). The Cultural Politics of Ecological Integrity: nature and Nation in Canada's National Parks, 1885–2000. International Journal of Canadian Studies / Revue internationale d'études canadiennes, (39–40), 161–189. https://doi.org/10.7202/040828ar
- Rohwer, Y., & Marris, E. (2021). Ecosystem integrity is neither real nor valuable. Conservation Science and Practice, 3(4). doi:10.1111/csp2.411
- Timko, J. A., & Innes, J. L. (2009). Evaluating ecological integrity in national parks: Case studies from Canada and South Africa. Biological Conservation, 142(3), 676–688. doi:10.1016/j.biocon.2008.11.022
- Unnasch, R.S., D. P. Braun, P. J. Comer, G. E. Eckert. 2008. The Ecological Integrity Assessment
- Woodley, S. (2010). Ecological Integrity and Canada's National Parks. The George Wright Forum, 27(2), 151–160. Retrieved December 15, 2020, from JSTOR 43598147
