= Buffalo National Park =

Former national park in Alberta, Canada

- IUCN category II (national park)
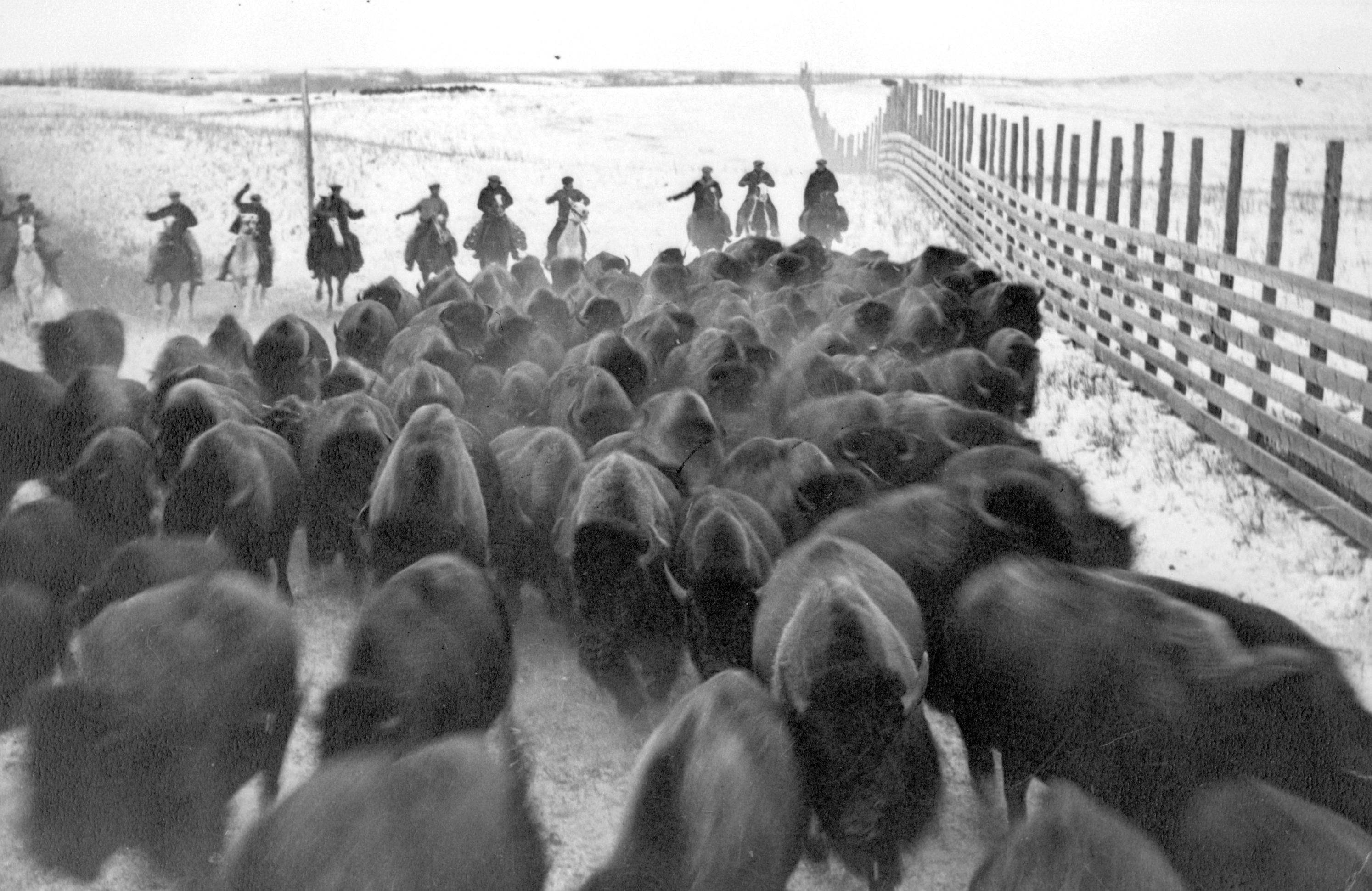
- Corraling buffalo in Wainwright Buffalo Park (1925). Bison were rounded up in Wainwright, Alberta, and transported by land and river to Wood Buffalo National Park in the far north of Alberta.
- Interactive map of Buffalo National Park
- Location: Alberta, Canada
- Nearest city: Wainwright
- Coordinates: 52°46′N 111°01′W
- Established: 1909
- Disestablished: 1947

Buffalo National Park was a national park created near the town of Wainwright in east central Alberta on June 5, 1909. It was closed in 1940 and delisted in 1947 when the land was transferred to the Department of National Defence. The 583 km^{2} (225 sq mi) park land was developed for use by Canadian Forces Base Wainwright and comprises the majority of its space. The first Park Warden was Bud Cotton, who served from 1912 through 1940.

Buffalo National Park, with a focus on plains bison (often referred to as buffalo), was one of several national parks created in the Canadian Prairies expressly to protect and regenerate dangerously low populations of bison and pronghorns. Other 'regeneration' parks, which were considered to have achieved their goals by the 1940s, were also delisted in 1947, including Wawaskesy National Park, Nemiskam National Park (both in Alberta), and Menissawok National Park in Saskatchewan.

The Canadian government populated Buffalo National Park with a herd of roughly 700 plains bison purchased from the Flathead Indian Reservation in the U.S. state of Montana. The herd was transported by train to the new park. The park also received smaller populations of elk and moose. During its thirty-one years of operation, the park produced 40,000 bison, 3000 elk, and 300 moose.

== History ==
=== Establishment ===
The fencing of the park reserve east of the Battle River was completed by September 1908. It took 73 miles (117 km) of exterior and interior fencing, including a 2,800-acre (1,100 ha) display paddock, at an initial cost of $60,000. By May 1909 the park was ready to receive its first bison from the herd bought from Michel Pablo in Montana.

=== Overpopulation and disease ===
The herd grew faster than the range could support. In the winter of 1923, the first organized slaughter killed 264 bison. Inspectors found that 75 percent of the slaughtered animals had some form of tuberculosis lesion. Seymour Hadwen of the Ontario Research Foundation recommended eliminating the herd to stop the infection, but park authorities rejected the proposal and adopted measures to reduce the disease instead. Some of the meat from the early slaughters was made into pemmican.

To reduce the herd, the Department of the Interior decided in 1924 to ship young bison each year to Wood Buffalo National Park, established in 1922 in the far north. Parks officials knew the plan risked both hybridization with the distinct wood bison and the spread of tuberculosis, and the animals sent north were limited to young bison that had been given a tuberculin test. Between 1925 and 1928, the shipments moved 6,673 bison north by rail and river. Annual slaughters at Wainwright resumed after 1928.

=== Closure (1939–1940) ===
After war was declared in September 1939, the Department of National Defence applied to use the entire park for military training. The national parks bureau recommended slaughtering all of the park's animals except those in the cattalo experiment. In his covering memorandum, the director of the Lands, Parks and Forests Branch wrote: "The outstanding feature of the whole matter from our standpoint is that the present is the first opportunity we have had to wind up affairs at Wainwright without admitting publicly that the herd is in bad condition."

The park marksman shot the bison in November and December 1939. The elk, deer and moose were killed early in 1940. In all, 2,918 bison, 1,806 elk, 113 moose and 242 deer were killed. Several hundred bison hides were reserved for the Royal Canadian Mounted Police, and the meat and hides of the other animals went to agents of the Indian Affairs Branch. When the Canadian Press reported the planned slaughter in November 1939, the department received a large volume of protest. Its public statement cited inadequate grazing range, while information about disease in the herd went, on a confidential basis, only to the Prime Minister and Cabinet ministers. The Winnipeg Free Press reported the tuberculosis in January 1940. On June 24, 1940, Minister of Mines and Resources Thomas Crerar acknowledged in the House of Commons that the bison had been destroyed because they were "badly infected by tuberculosis".

=== Military use and Camp 135 ===
An Order in Council under the War Measures Act allowed the Department of National Defence to occupy most of the park for the duration of the war, and the military formally took over the park on September 30, 1940. Warden E. J. "Bud" Cotton stayed on as caretaker for the department until August 1944. A brigade group camp was built in 1943 at a cost of $1.6 million, and units of two Canadian infantry divisions trained there.

In December 1944 the premises were converted to a prisoner-of-war camp, Internment Camp No. 135, with accommodation for 2,000 men. The first 523 German prisoners arrived on January 29, 1945. At its peak the camp held almost 1,100 German prisoners, mostly officers, along with enlisted men and a few civilians. Two prisoners escaped in 1945 and were recaptured just over a month later in Gary, Indiana. The last prisoners left on May 24, 1946, and the camp staff and guard company were reduced to nil strength a few weeks later.

=== Abolition ===
After the prisoner-of-war camp closed, National Defence sought permanent use of the area for training. Under an agreement approved by the Governor General in Council on May 16, 1947, Alberta would transfer 150 square miles (390 km^{2}) of the former park to Canada for military use, and in exchange give part of the Cooking Lake Forest Reserve to Elk Island National Park. The National Parks Amendment Act, 1947, which received assent on July 17, 1947, abolished Buffalo National Park and Nemiskam National Park. The land became CFB Wainwright, which remained the Canadian Army's main training area in the West.

In 1980, to commemorate the 75th anniversary of Alberta and the legacy of the former Buffalo National Park, four bison from Elk Island National Park were moved to Wainwright. Today, about a dozen bison reside on CFB Wainwright in Bud Cotton Paddock, named for the first Park Warden.

== See also ==
- Wood Buffalo National Park
- Mount Buffalo National Park
