= James Bernard Harkin =

Canadian journalist and bureaucrat

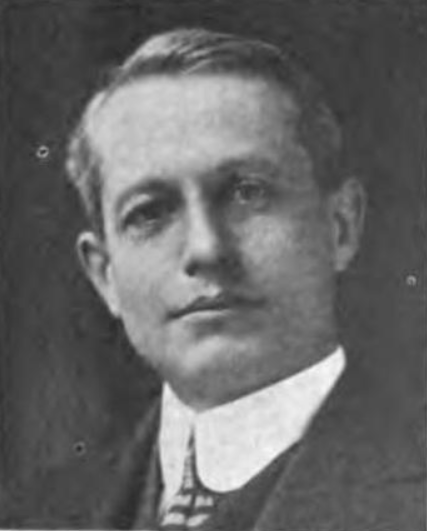

1st Commissioner of the Dominion Parks Branch
- In office 1911–1936
- Succeeded by: Frank H. H. Williamson

Personal details
- Born: 30 January 1875 Vankleek Hill, Ontario, Canada
- Died: 27 January 1955 (aged 79) Ottawa, Ontario
- Resting place: Beechwood Cemetery
- Parent(s): Dr. William Harkin and Elizabeth McDonnell
- Known for: First Commissioner of Dominion Parks Branch (now Parks Canada)

James B. Harkin (30 January 1875 – 27 January 1955), also known as the Father of National Parks, was a Canadian journalist turned bureaucrat with a passion for conservation but also widely renowned for his commodification of the Canadian landscape. Harkin began his career as a journalist under the umbrella of the Ottawa Journal and Montreal Herald, two conservative newspapers at the time, but soon through his persistence and prowess gained entry into civil service during his mid-twenties. Under the tutelage of some influential figures working for the Liberal Party of Canada, most notably Clifford Sifton and Frank Oliver, Harkin was able to acquire an appointment to be the first commissioner of the Dominion Parks Branch in 1911. During his career, Harkin oversaw the establishment of national parks that include Elk Island, Mount Revelstoke, Point Pelee, Kootenay, Wood Buffalo, Prince Albert, Riding Mountain, Georgian Bay Islands and Cape Breton Highlands.

On a fundamental level, Harkin's philosophy had two dominant components: the economic, which saw park lands in commercial terms, and the humanitarian which saw parks as being integral to the well-being of the human spirit on a physical, mental and moral level. In successfully bringing these two principles together in a symbiotic way, Harkin was able to facilitate the incredible growth of Canadian tourism and, at the same time, justify his conservationist goals.

With an economic philosophy on parks development, Harkin led the Parks Branch into the business of selling Canadian scenery to tourists. Harkin identified the emergence of the automobile as a key component in driving tourism to Canada's national parks. Some notable commercial achievements Harkin made included motor vehicle legislation that permitted vehicles to enter parks, improvements of existing roads through parks, and major highway projects that connected more visitors to parks. His parks promotion strategy, favourable motor vehicle regulations, and improvements in accessibility notably increased tourism to Canada's national parks from 100,000 in 1921 to 550,000 in 1928.

In 1935, following the rise of the Liberal Party, Parks Branch became consolidated with other departments and Harkin's career as commissioner came to an eventual end.

Starting in the 1970s, some years after Harkin's death, many critiques of Harkin that cast him in an unfavourable light started surfacing. In particular, Harkin's lack of knowledge of his duties as commissioner, his alleged over-dependence on his staff, and his desire to employ men under the market minimum wage were quite controversial. Moreover, the creation of the Wood Buffalo National Park sparked huge debate with local indigenous groups and the rippling effects of that debate are still being dealt with today.

== Early life ==
James Bernard Harkin, nicknamed "Bunny", was born 30 January 1875, in the town of Vankleek Hill in eastern Ontario. His parents were Dr. William Harkin and Elizabeth (McDonnell). He was the fourth of five children born into a devout Catholic family but along with his brother William, Harkin was unconcerned with religious motivations. Their father, Dr. William Harkin, was a devout Catholic who was born to Irish Protestant immigrants in 1831 in Vanleek Hill where he became a schoolteacher and soon after went to study medicine at McGill University. Harkin's father died of a heart attack while speaking at the Legislative Assembly of Ontario in 1881. His father was a staunch advocate for the Conservatives in which he held a seat in the Legislative Assembly for the district of Prescott.

After the death of his father, Harkin remained with his mother and sister until his high school years when he left to live with his brother who had become a doctor in Marquette, Michigan. Harkin was born into general affluence and a politically powerful family. Despite the passing of his father, Harkin's upbringing influenced his ability to forge the beginning of his career as a cub reporter with the Montreal Herald at age seventeen.

== Political career ==
Harkin's route into a political career was generated mostly by his family, in which his father was a Conservative with a seat in the Legislative Assembly and his brother was a highly touted journalist for the Ottawa Journal. These early family influences would play a large role in the development of Harkin's political career and would shape his early affiliations. It was through the mentorship of his brother, William Harkin, that he gained employment with the Montreal Herald, but shortly afterwards with the Ottawa Journal under the guidance of P.D Ross. P.D Ross was the proprietor of the Ottawa Journal. He became an influential person in Harkin's career as he saw him develop his knack for clear, concise journalism. Ross recommended Harkin to the Liberal Party's Minister of Interior and Superintendent of Indian Affairs, Clifford Sifton. This recommendation allowed Harkin to enter the government service in 1896 at the age of twenty-six.

Harkin's acceptance of this appointment by Clifford Sifton surprised many Conservatives that saw their leader, Sir Charles Tupper, defeated by Wilfrid Laurier in the same year as Harkin's appointment. The rise of the Liberal Party and Harkin's employment under them dictated much of his later appointments in which he worked tirelessly for Sifton until 1905, at which point Sifton fell out of favour with Wilfrid Laurier over educational rights. Frank Oliver was appointed as the new Minister of the Interior, and sought to be a supporter of parks and wildlife. Despite Oliver's distaste for Sifton, Harkin retained his position with Oliver and worked a further 6 years as Oliver's secretary until receiving an appointment to be the first commissioner of the Dominion Parks Branch in 1911.

== Philosophy ==
On the one hand, Harkin's success and longevity as Parks Commissioner can be measured in economic terms, namely in tourism profits. However, Harkin's philosophy of preserving Canada's landscape for the sake of patriotic pride and physical, moral, and mental well-being is also evident and well-documented in his writings and departmental reports. In fact, some historians argue that it is in great part his ability to have both his commercial and preservationist goals merge and play off each other that determines his success as commissioner. But whether Harkin used commercial reasons of building national parks to justify the humanitarian reasons or vice versa is an open-ended question that some Harkin biographers continue to debate.

=== Economic value of parks ===
Harkin's success in securing appropriations to finance the building and expansion of national parks was largely due to his ability to convey the commercial value of dominion parks to Parliament. At the onset of his Parks Branch career, Harkin and his staff had sought to find out how much revenue was generated by tourism in both American states and European countries. His findings, which included tens of millions of dollars for just the American state of Maine, were astounding and he went on to publish a compiled report of tourist revenue figures for distribution to members of the House of Commons and Senate in 1913. It was in that context, Harkin believed, that the economic value of Canada's national parks was established and would come to later justify his many large expenditures for park development.

=== Humanitarian value of parks ===
In addition to Harkin's philosophy on the economic value of parks, Harkin also saw parks as being a way for Canadians to imbue the beauty of Canadian scenery in an accessible manner, be it by car or train to reach park grounds. But, as his annual reports as commissioner show, he also felt there was a higher purpose to exposing more individuals to Canada's scenic beauty beyond mere aesthetics. In Harkin's earlier years as Parks Commissioner, he expressed on many occasions that parks allowed for the fostering of what he coins the "play spirit", which is the rejuvenation of the human spirit from the daily stresses of life through outdoor recreation. This need not be physical recreational activity; however, breathing in fresh air and being within close proximity of nature is an important part of this rejuvenation process. This aspect of Harkin's philosophy in viewing parks as national recreational grounds for therapeutic and rejuvenating effects was in part due to the influence of American wilderness preservationists, John Muir and Henry David Thoreau, both of whom Harkin had quoted in his departmental reports.

With the onset of the First World War, Harkin's rejuvenation theory took on a more relevant form. In those years, Harkin wrote that parks were a medium through which Canadians could be in touch with their patriotic feelings, and that parks promoted the "virile and efficient manhood so noticeable in Canadian military training camps."

Also, in post-war years, Harkin's philosophy again adapted to the context in which he felt national parks were most needed. For many at the time, life consisted of long hours of laborious work in factories and living in big cities, which according to Harkin brought out the animal in man and deteriorated both the body and mind of the modern Canadian subject. But a feasible way to counteract these oppressive effects, Harkin wrote, was through the almost mystical rejuvenation that national park lands offered on a physical, mental, and even moral level. Despite appearing so though, Harkin's philosophy was not a critique of industrial life and urbanism. Rather, it was his belief that national parks were a way for civilization and economic growth in Canada to continue "with the worker escaping periodically to nature to be recharged" but with every intention of returning as a productive member of society.

== Commercial achievements ==
=== Tourism ===
Harkin recognized that Canadian scenery was a natural resource that could not be exported. He led the Parks Branch into what some critics call the business of selling scenery, where foreign tourists were to be imported to enjoy Canada's natural resource. Harkin often described parks in economic terms. In the Parks Branch's first Annual Report, he stated the value of Canadian scenery at $13.88/acre, while wheat land was worth $4.91/acre. He recognized that unlike most natural resources, large sales of scenery could be sold in perpetuity without any decline in value or capital stock.

The National Parks of Canada were established largely to stimulate traffic on the Canadian Pacific Railway. The railway attracted tourists to Rocky Mountain National Park. Harkin further developed national parks with the goal of economic prosperity. Parks would increase tourism and profitability for the government, railroads, and small businesses. In order to garner political support for parks development, Harkin communicated the profitable opportunities they could provide Canada.

Initially, the Parks Branch focused on enticing foreign visitors to Canada. Canadian national parks were largely accessible by wealthy American tourists who stayed at hotels and travelled by railway: 95% of people travelling to Canada were American. Thus, Harkin's initial goal was to extend this flow of American tourists into Canada.

By the 1920s, the Parks Branch shifted their focus and began targeting Canadians. Formerly, critics argued that the government was subsidizing parks for wealthy foreigners. Harkin suggested that the automobile now made it logistically and financially possible for more middle-class Canadian tourists to access the national parks. Parks located near cities were now widely accessible, allowing workers to spend weekends camping or fishing. The Parks Branch began promoting parks as attractive tourism that heals and invigorates the hardworking business man. Responding to the increased use of automobiles, Harkin redefined the Branch's goals from servicing a foreign and local "recreationist" to the broader "Canadian".

Harkin relied on free publicity to promote tourism. The Parks Branch Annual Report outlined the commercial and humanitarian benefits of parks. These mandatory publications were sent to Members of Parliament and newspapers across Canada. They became the Parks Branch's initial marketing tool. In the 1920s, Harkin appointed Mabel Williams to author guidebooks and literature that promoted parks as a Canadian birthright that made one physically stronger, psychologically renewed, and spiritually fulfilled. With increased tourism, the Branch could afford printing the guidebooks. Their spending in the government printing department jumped from $2000 to almost $13,000 in one year. The Parks Branch created a Publicity Division to promote Canada's parks through guidebooks, lectures, slide presentations, and motion pictures. This successful division would later form the Canadian Government Travel Bureau and National Film Board of Canada.

=== Challenges ===
Harkin faced challenges that constricted the Parks Branch's potential for success. In 1914, the National Parks budget was 0.5% of the total federal budget. The popularity of automobiles lead to a decline in railroad support for parks development. From 1915 to 1947, average annual expenditures slid to 0.28% of the federal budget, demonstrating the effects of lost railroad support. Harkin convinced politicians that creating parks would gain the support of constituents through increased enjoyment from park's amenities. As such, he attempted to increase the Parks Branch budget through two allies: politicians seeking park and road development for constituents and small businesses that would benefit from tourism. This was not powerful enough to keep the budget afloat.

=== Automobiles and road development ===
Harkin made an impact on Canadian tourism through changing automobile regulations and increasing road development to parks. In 1905, the Federal Government passed legislation banning the use of automobiles on any road near or within prescribed limits of Banff National Park. Parks had previously been reserved for the exclusive use of railway travelers to protect the railroad monopoly and interests. Harkin held no ties to the railroad industry or those businesses that benefited from their protection. He viewed the predominant usage of automobiles as an opportunity for national park's to gain commercial success. In 1911, Harkin cancelled the prohibition on automobiles in parks and introduced motor vehicle legislation: 25 cent registration and speed limits (8 MPH in townsites; 15 MPH elsewhere). This was not an open invitation to motorists as strict limitations still existed: cars had to travel from Calgary on the Calgary-Banff Coach Road and strictly follow Banff Avenue and Spray Avenue to the CPR's Banff Springs Hotel. In 1913, Harkin allowed automobiles to visit golf courses and private homes. He introduced a $5 annual license and a $1 single trip fee for using cars within parks. By 1915, these regulations extended to include all national parks. In 1919, he increased the speed limit to 25 MPH.

Harkin identified road development as another measure to increase the profitability of tourism and national parks. His goal was to make the scenery of the Canadian Rockies accessible to automobile traffic through first class motor roads into and through parks. With adequate roads through mountains, there would be increased traffic and significant spending from auto-tourists. The Calgary-Banff Coach Road, completed in 1911, absorbed a significant portion of the Parks budget for years. With no allegiance to the railroad and its dependants, Harkin increased road development and continued to increase accessibility of automobiles into parks. Under Harkin's tenure as commissioner, major roads such as the Banff-Windermere Highway, Edmonton-Jasper-Banff Highway, and the Kicking Horse Trail were built. By 1930, around 400 miles of parks roads were built, with 145 miles servicing the Rocky Mountain Parks.

After World War I, low priced automobiles and suitable roads made parks more accessible. Automobiles increased Canadian attendance to national parks: 100,000 in 1921, 250,000 in 1925, and 550,000 in 1928. This stimulated business for small tourist shops, service stations, grocery stores, and motels along Canadian highways. The small business sector in Canada grew with the increased tourism to national parks.

== Wildlife conservation ==
=== Wood Buffalo National Park ===
As a result of Harkin's contribution, the Wood Buffalo National Park was established on 18 December 1922. The park was created to protect the last remaining herds of bison in northern Canada during the early 1900s. Today, the park is known for its preservation of the bison that reside there. The park was initially created by Harkin and his branch members to protect the existing habitat of about 1500 Wood Buffalo. During the early 1830s, there were millions of bison. However, the progress to civilization and modernity created a decline in the bison population from the estimated 40 million in 1830 to less than 1000 by 1900. Today, the land consists of 44,807 square kilometers and is located in northern Alberta, with overlaps into the Northwest Territories. The land serves as the largest free-roaming and self-regulated bison herd park in the world and the world's only natural nesting site of the whooping crane. The whooping crane is officially classified as an endangered species. In 1941, there were 15 and with the assistance of the park, the population increased to 133 by 1994. The whooping crane is the tallest North American bird, with a height of about 1.5 metres. Whooping crane have white colored bodies with black wing tips, face, and legs. The landscape of this natural park can be divided into four primary sections, each with its own unique geological features, wildlife habitats, and vegetation. Some of which include the Caribou, Birch Uplands, the Alberta plateau, Slave River Lowlands, and the Peace-Athabasca Delta.

=== Migratory Birds Convention Act ===
The Migratory Bird Treaty Act of 1918 was first passed in 1916, and sought to preserve migrating birds from extinction as a result of slaughter by suppliers to the milliner's trade, market hunters, and spring shootings. In response, the Canadian government suggested to draft a similar bill to protect and preserve the birds. In August 1917, the legislation was established by Harkin and the government. It was a landmark in the evolution of the Canadian government's role in wildlife protection. It created greater clarification of the government's responsibilities for wildlife and established the emergence of a wildlife protective policy for Canada. The goal of this new conservation act was to protect and regulate the excessive practice of bird hunting. With the Migratory Birds Convention Act, Harkin was able to achieve his goal of receiving complete authority for game protection in Canada. The act led to boundary revisions of Rocky Mountain Park and the re-inclusion of the Kananaskis Valley, which Harkin believed was necessary to protect game.

=== Pronghorn Project ===
The pronghorn antelope was another large Canadian mammal believed to be on the verge of extinction. In 1910, the pronghorn antelope was moved from the Banff Paddock into Wood Buffalo National Park. Harkin believed the animal would benefit in a new protected park area. In March 1912, the park reported the presence of fourteen antelope. However, the effort was unsuccessful as the pronghorn antelope population decreased due to a lack of proper diet. In 1915, Harkin continued to play an essential role in antelope preservation near the village of Nemiskam, Alberta, where about 200 starving antelope were found in a ranch near the village of Foremost. The antelope were removed and sent to a reserved area of Maple Creek, where sufficient food and resources were available . On 18 December 1915, Minister William James Roche approved the formal reservation of seven square miles of land and established the Nemiskam National Antelope Reserve. In 1917, the American Permanent Wild Life Protection Fund recognized Canada as the first country to create a fenced preserve for antelope. In 2012, the pronghorn antelope can be found in southern Saskatchewan and Alberta.

== Controversy ==
Before the 1970s, Harkin was viewed as a visionary conservationist and creator of Canada's national park system. Since then, many critiques of Harkin have cast him in a darker light. When Harkin was appointed National Parks Branch Commissioner in 1911, he had to juggle the twin policy of advocating conservatism while encouraging tourism to the parks, which brought forth controversy to Harkin's role as commissioner. When Harkin accepted the job, he admitted that he knew little about parks in general or what was expected of him in his role as commissioner. Many biographers have written about Harkin's work, but his life is based on a very thin collection of sources, leading to skepticism about his duty and achievements as commissioner. Harkin's personal archival papers say little about his involvement with the national parks; they focus almost entirely on his notes and correspondence on Vilhjalmur Stefansson’s expedition to the Arctic in 1921. The limited information about Harkin's life has led biographers to create several sizable assumptions about him, one being that everything written by Harkin is credited to him alone. Parks Branch papers show that what is attributed to Harkin was actually first drafted by others, especially his assistant, F.H.H. Williamson. Harkin also adapted many of his policies from the American National Park Service, because of the familiarity of geographic location and goal at improving the development of the parks through tourism.

=== 1922 Wood Buffalo National Park ===
One of the first controversies that Harkin was involved in was the Parks Branch's first attempt to create a wood bison sanctuary. The disagreement proved to create tensions within the federal government and also started the theory that local indigenous peoples were to blame for the decrease in the population of buffalo. The tension between the Indian Affairs Department and wildlife conservationists was very evident at the National Conference on Conservation of Game, Fur-Bearing Animals, and other Wild Life held in February 1919. The beginning of the conference began with Arthur Meighen, then Superintendent General of Indian Affairs, emphasizing the complete dependence that the northern Native people have on wildlife, and how prohibiting the Native from hunting buffalo would greatly and negatively affect their livelihood. Harkin stated his own views and discussed how wildlife preserves prohibiting Indigenous peoples from hunting was crucial for conservation. He argued that indigenous peoples should respect this, since they have wholesome respect for park boundaries. Wood Buffalo National Park was created in 1922 to help preserve the five hundred buffalo that were found south of the Great Slave Lake in Northern Alberta. Indigenous groups that lived in the area protested the creation of the Wood Buffalo National Park up until its establishment and continued after in hopes of gaining back their sovereignty and their right to hunt on their traditional territories. The creation of the park led to a dramatic increase of law enforcement and administrative personnel on indigenous lands, which allowed the federal government to administer a system of wildlife regulations that would include punishments of fines, jail terms, and hard labor if indigenous persons were to stray from the law.

=== Cheap labour ===
The development of parks across Canada was only possible because the male labourers were paid below market wage and had no other job opportunities. Thousands of men worked for the Parks Department from 1914 to 1915. These men included relief workers during the Great Depression and prisoners of both World Wars. Harkin was satisfied with his new work force because he was able to pay them twenty-five cents a day, while the daily wage in an isolated camp was two dollars. This labour wage differential caused a protest at Yoho Park, where the men refused to work as market wages had increased to twelve dollars a day while they continued to receive twenty-five cents. The situation escalated beyond Harkin's control and caused him to ask the Department of Defense to take over; the men responded by a failed attempt to dig their way out of the park and escape. Eventually, the camp was closed and the men were released.

In 1924, the mine at Brule in Jasper National Park was closed. Alberta asked Ottawa and the Parks Branch for aid to go towards the newly unemployed. Harkin responded by telling the park superintendent to provide groceries if conditions were desperate, but not cash as he did not want to encourage further demands. By 1929, the Jasper Parks superintendent was desperately seeking financial support and asked Harkin for $20,000 to go towards work-for-relief projects, but Harkin refused. The declining conditions in Jasper presaged the stock market crash in 1929. Crops began to fall and by 1933, one-fifth of the work force was unemployed while 15% of Canadians were on relief.

Also, in 1932, Harkin enforced the six-day work week because he felt the parks' workers would be more compliant when occupied. He stripped his workers of civil liberties including restrictions on alcohol consumption. Restrictions lead to protests from his workers. Harkin needed to gain control of the protests. He did this by enforcing a law that prohibited collective organizations and would fire any individual on strike.

== See also ==
- Mount Harkin, a mountain in Kootenay named after Harkin
