= Yellowstone National Park Protection Act =

Act which made Yellowstone the first U.S. national park

The Yellowstone National Park Protection Act was a law passed by the 42nd US Congress and signed into law by President Ulysses S. Grant on March 1, 1872, creating Yellowstone National Park. Yellowstone was the first national park in the US and is considered to be the first national park in the world.

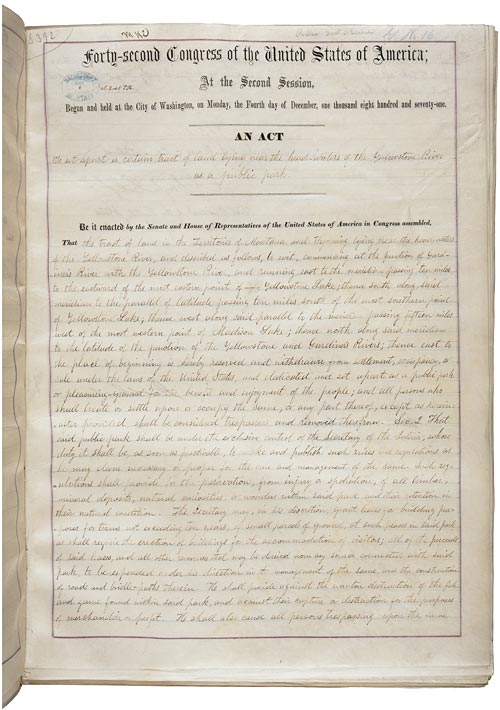
Yellowstone National Park Protection Act
