= Mealy Mountains =

Mountain range in Canada

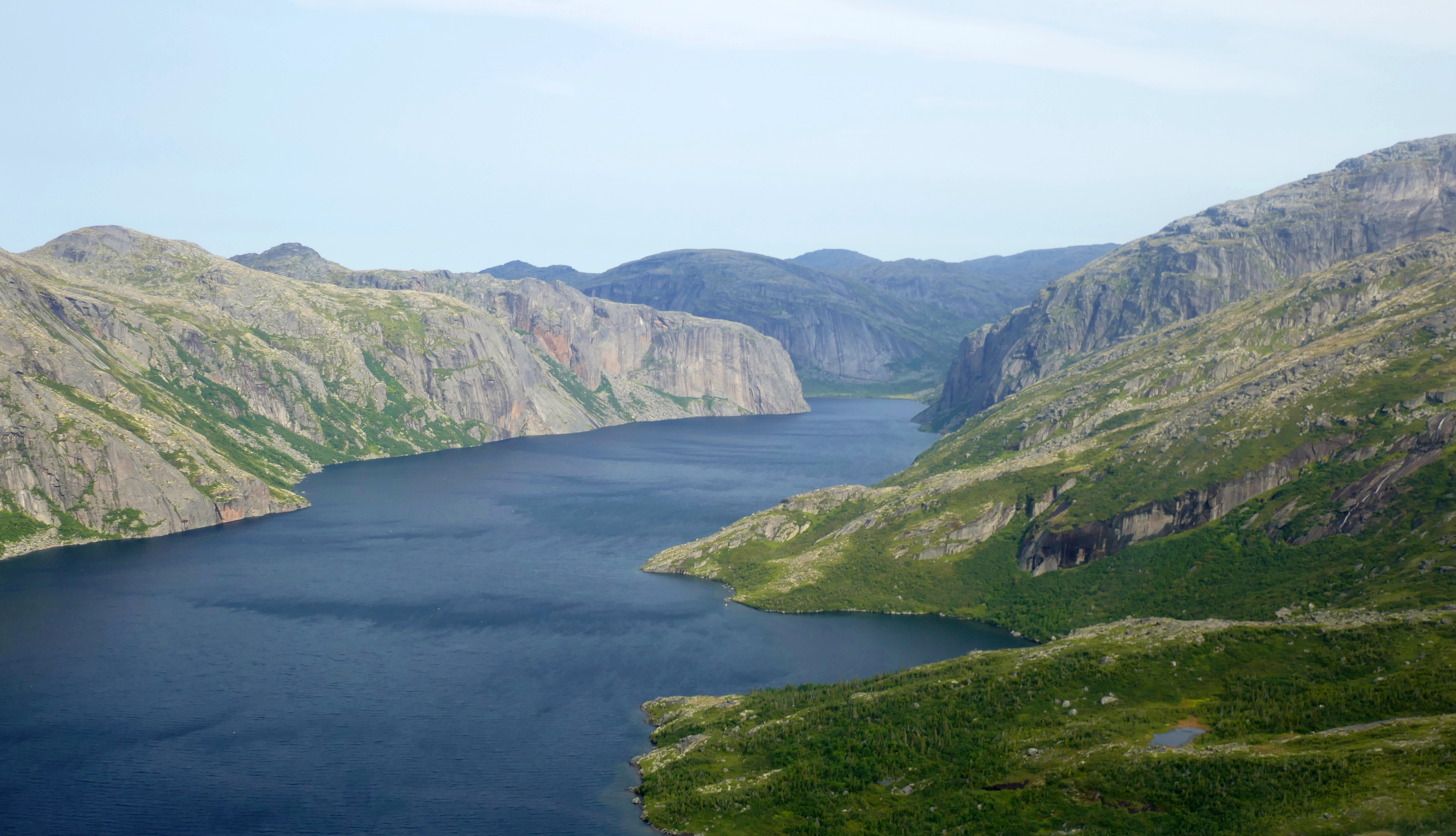

Highest point
- Peak: Highest Point
- Elevation: 1,180 m (3,870 ft)

Geography
- Country: Canada
- Province: Newfoundland and Labrador
- Range coordinates: 53°23′N 59°28′W
- Parent range: Laurentian Mountains

The Mealy Mountains is a mountain range in the southern portion of Labrador in the Canadian province of Newfoundland and Labrador. The mountains lie south of Lake Melville and cover an area of approximately 26,495 km^{2} (10,231 mi^{2}).

The Mealy Mountains encompass five of Labrador's ten provincial ecoregions, including coastal barrens, high sub arctic tundra, high boreal forest, mid boreal forest, and string bog. The mountain range reach heights of more than 1,000 m (3,281 ft), with the highest peak being more than 1,180 m (3,871 ft).

== National Park ==
A significant portion of the mountain range and surrounding area was designated a potential National Park Reserve in 2015: the Mealy Mountains National Park Reserve, a move which follows lobbying for the preservation of the area since the early 1970s. The governments of Canada (Parks Canada) and Newfoundland and Labrador (Ministry of Environment and Conservation) have agreed to pursue creation of a National Park Reserve, which would see the area managed as if it were a national park, pending settlement of Native land claims. Once settled, the area would likely be designated a national park, comprising approximately 20,000 km².
