= Nemiskam National Park =

Former national park in Alberta, Canada

Coordinates: 49.539164°N 111.417321°W

Nemiskam National Park was created north of the community of Nemiskam (today a ghost town) in south central Alberta, Canada, in 1922. The park was closed and delisted in 1947. The first park superintendent was Edgar McHugh. Nemiskam is a Blackfoot word meaning "between two valleys", referring to the Chin Coulee and Etzikom Coulee on either side of the former community.

== History ==
Beginning in 1914, a large portion of the 139 km^{2} (54 sq mi) of land that would later form Nemiskam National Park was designated the Nemiskam National Antelope Reserve, to protect Pronghorn (often referred to as antelope). The area was one of many pronghorn reserves created in Alberta and Saskatchewan at that time.

Nemiskam National Park was one of several national parks created in the Canadian Prairies expressly to protect and regenerate dangerously low populations of bison and Pronghorn. Other 'regeneration' parks were Buffalo National Park and Wawaskesy National Park (both in Alberta) and Menissawok National Park in Saskatchewan.

With the rebound of pronghorn herds in southern Saskatchewan and Alberta, Nemiskam was closed in 1947, as the Buffalo (closed 1940), Wawaskesy (closed 1938) and Menissawok (closed 1930) 'regeneration' parks had been earlier. All four parks were delisted from the record of national parks in 1947, with the Nemiskam land returned to general use.
