= Kadleroshilik Pingo =

Large pingo located in northern Alaska

Coordinates: 70°01′14″N 147°40′52″W

Kadleroshilik Pingo (or Kadleroshilik Mound) is a pingo located about 40 kilometers (25 mi) southeast of Prudhoe Bay in the U.S. state of Alaska. Rising to an elevation of 54 meters (178 ft) above the surrounding lake plain, it is the highest known pingo in the world.

The pingo's existence was first noted in the 1919 monograph The Canning River Region, Northern Alaska by Ernest de Koven Leffingwell. Leffingwell, who had visited the site in 1911, adopted the Eskimo name for the mound, which he interpreted as possibly meaning "possesses something on top" or "which seems to approach"; he also named the nearby Kadleroshilik River for the mound.

For her dissertation on the ecology of Alaskan pingos, based on studies conducted in the 1980s, Marilyn Drew Walker selected Kadleroshilik Pingo as one of her study sites specifically because of its unusual size. Botanical specimens she collected at the site are in the herbarium of the University of Alaska Museum of the North.
