= Canada National Parks Act =

Canadian act of parliament

Parliament of Canada
- Considered by: House of Commons of Canada
- Considered by: Senate of Canada

Initiating chamber: House of Commons of Canada
- Introduced by: Sheila Copps MP, Minister of Canadian Heritage

Revising chamber: Senate of Canada
- Member(s) in charge: Tommy Banks
- Status: Current legislation

The Canada National Parks Act (French: Loi sur les parcs nationaux du Canada) is a Canadian federal law that regulates protection of natural areas of national significance. As of March 2019, the Canada National Parks Act extended federal protection to 47 national parks and park reserves across the country covering more the 300,000 km^{2} of habitat. The current Canada National Parks Act received royal assent on October 20, 2000 and has been amended since. The first national parks act in Canada was created in 1887 shortly following the creation of the world's first national park, Yellowstone National Park, in the United States. In 1911, under a renewed national parks act, Canada became the first country in the world to establish their own national parks service.

Over the course of its history, the predecessor National Parks Act struggled to define the primary intention of national parks by trying to balance parks as places both of conservation and public leisure. Remarks made by the Canadian Minister of Environment and Climate Change in 2018 signalled a renewed commitment by the Parks Canada agency to ecological conservation within national parks. Early legislation in Canada applied exclusionary policies and forcibly removed Indigenous peoples off lands in order to create national parks. With developments in the legal recognition of Aboriginal title and rights in Canada, provisions have been included within the National Parks Act to extend the right of traditional harvesting activities within national park reserves with some cases altering park management to be shared between the Parks Canada agency and local Indigenous groups.

== History of the Canada National Parks Act ==
=== 1887—the Rocky Mountains Park Act ===
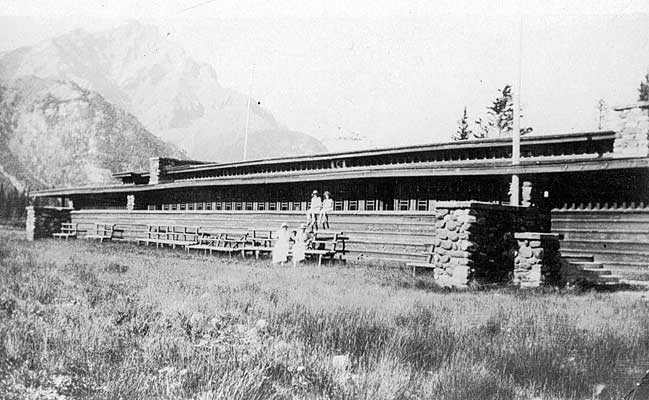
Banff National Park Pavilion, circa 1920

Greatly inspired by the creation of Yellowstone National Park in the United States in 1872, the Rocky Mountains Park Act established the first distinctive national parks legislation in Canada and provided for the creation of the country's first national park, Rocky Mountain Park (now Banff National Park). Lobbied heavily for by the Canadian Pacific Railway, the Act outlined the national parks model which balanced conservation as well as development. The Act established the management of the park and its resources to be under the authority of the Minister of the Interior and the Governor in Council. The Rocky Mountains Park Act also prohibited the settlement or occupation of any of the park’s area, giving the Minister of the Interior and Governor in Council the right to remove trespassers.

=== 1911—the Dominion Forest Reserves and Parks Act ===
Passed by the government of Sir Wilfrid Laurier, the Dominion Forest Reserves and Parks Act received royal assent on May 19, 1911. One of the most significant results of the Act was that it created the Dominion Parks Branch as a new branch of the Department of the Interior to oversee the administration of federal parks. Incidentally the Dominion Parks Branch was the first national parks service in the world to be established and James Bernard Harkin was made its first commissioner. Inspired by American environmentalist, John Muir, Harkin oversaw the number of parks in Canada triple (from 6–18).

=== 1930—the National Parks Act ===
Arising from years of dissatisfaction from Commissioner Harkin and his administration, the National Parks Act, which was implemented in 1930, replaced the administration of the national parks from the Dominion Forest Reserves and Parks Act. Unlike in earlier legislation, the general purpose section (section 4) of the National Parks Act (1930) stated that national parks are spaces of nature to “be maintained and made use of so as to leave them unimpaired for the enjoyment of future generations.” Such phrasing in the Act has led to it being recognized as the foundation upon which subsequent ecological protection within national parks has been based. However, economic development remained a prominent role of parks.

=== 2000—the Canada National Parks Act ===
The Canada National Parks Act, which received royal assent in 2000, applies the strongest conservation language to date making the maintenance and restoration of ecological integrity within national parks its number one priority. Section 32 of the Act, Mitigation of Environmental Damage, implements the legal requirement of anyone who is responsible for environmental damage within a park to take measures to prevent environmental degradation and danger to flora and fauna. If the responsible person does not comply, they are liable for the expenses of those measures which would be performed by the federal government. Despite this commitment to ecological protection, the Canada National Parks Act continues to apply the historic dualism between development and conservation by dedicating the national parks to "the people of Canada for their benefit, education and enjoyment" (2000, c.32, s.4).

== Park lands ==
=== National parks ===
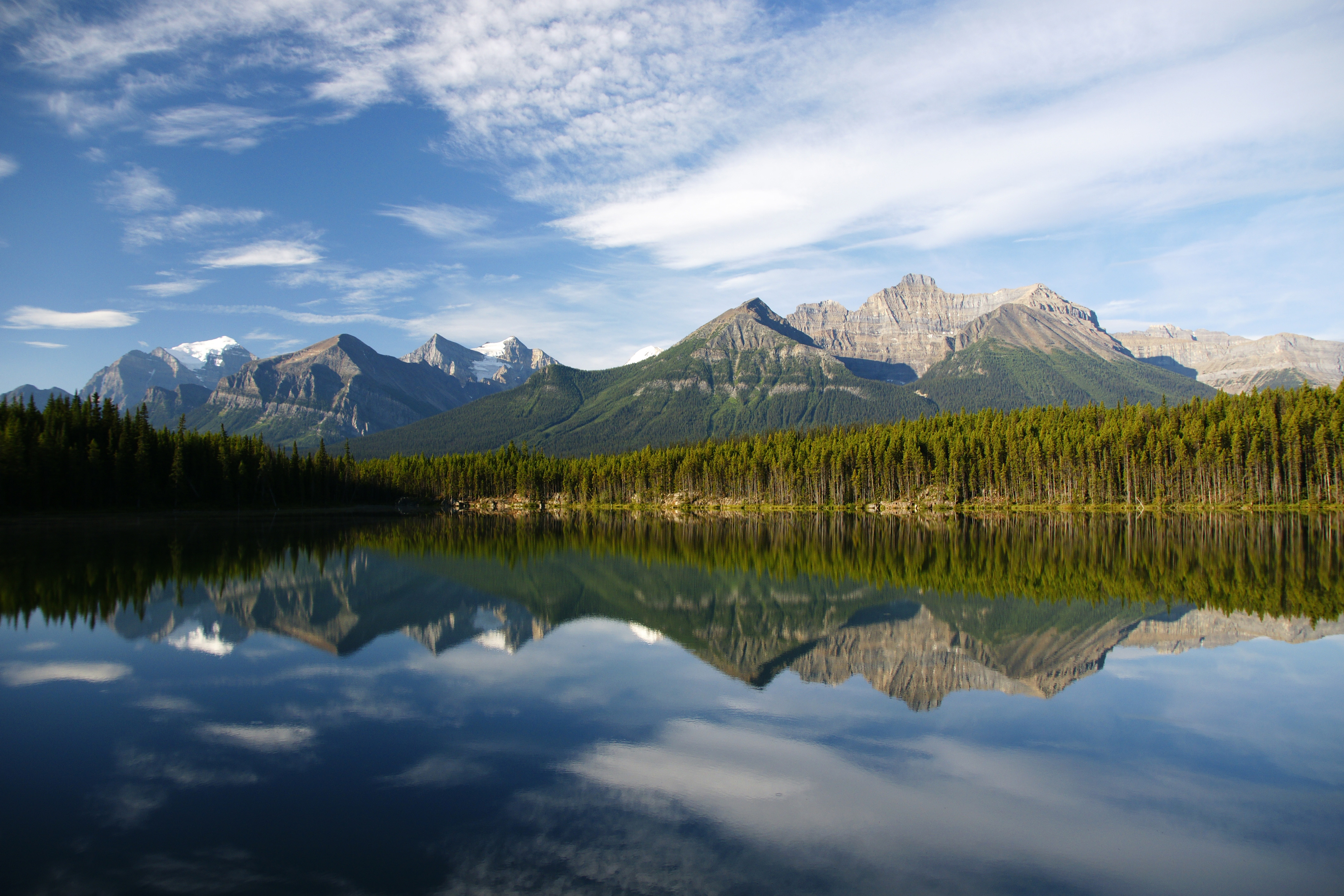
Banff Park—Canada's first National Park

The Act enables Parks Canada to designate and maintain national parks and national park reserves. Within these, additional wilderness areas may be designated. Natural resources in protected areas are dedicated to the "benefit, education and enjoyment" of the people of Canada. Development in the national parks has to be authorized by Parks Canada, subject to the provisions of this Act.

=== National Park Reserves ===
National park reserves are defined as protected areas that have not yet been brought under federal jurisdiction due to outstanding matters (such as aboriginal rights). The Canada National Parks Act applies to park reserves as if they were parks apart from sections 40 to 41.4 which stipulate the right of Aboriginal people to practice traditional renewable resource harvesting activities within the park reserve boundaries.

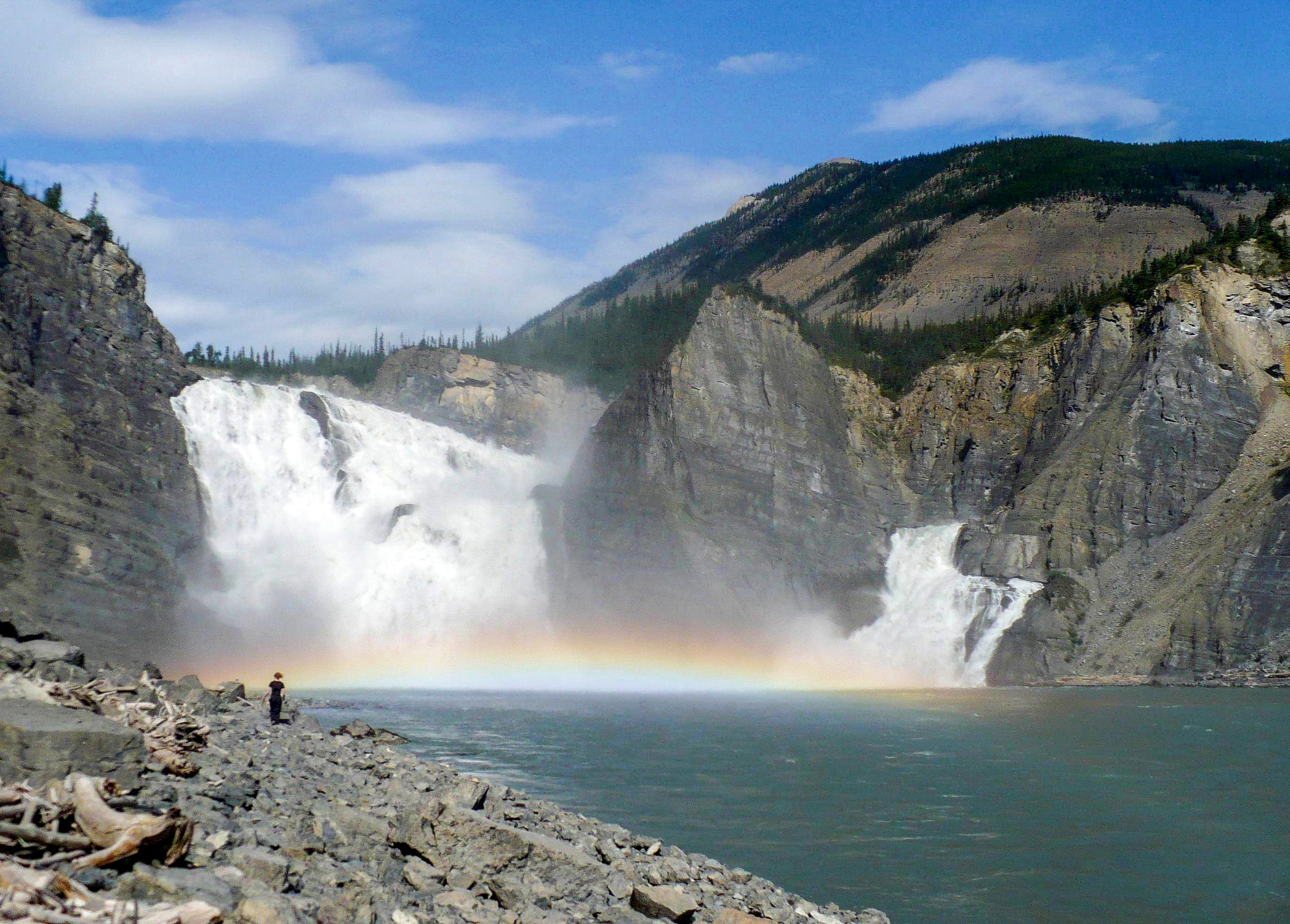
Nahanni National Park Reserve was one of the first established park reserves in Canada.

In 1972, Kluane National Park Reserve and Nahanni National Park Reserve became the first areas to be established as park reserves. The park reserves share management of the land between Parks Canada and local First Nations.

=== Wilderness areas ===
Wilderness areas are lands within national parks, that are found in a natural state or are capable of returning to a natural state. Any activity that may impair the wilderness character of these areas is restricted, with the possible exception of activities regarding public safety, basic visitor facilities and park administration.

== Indigenous peoples and park lands ==
=== Exclusionary policies ===
Many of Canada's national parks were established on the traditional lands of Indigenous peoples and it has been argued that early national parks were used as tools of colonialism. Although today Parks Canada promotes itself as working closely with a number of Indigenous groups as partners in the management of many national park reserves, past national parks acts explicitly excluded Indigenous peoples from parklands. In some cases, Indigenous people were forcibly removed from areas that would become national parks, while in others, Indigenous people were encouraged to sell or trade their reserves for lands outsides of the park.

The creation of Canada’s first national park, Banff National Park (then Rocky Mountains National Park), barred the Stoney Nakoda First Nation from the parklands where they had previously hunted and travelled. Similarly in 1907, with the creation of Jasper National Park, Métis families who had been living in the area were suddenly declared "squatters". The Rocky Mountains Park Act (1887) explicitly stated the provision by which people could be removed from the land. Sections 3 and 4 of the Rocky Mountains Act stated that "no person shall locate, settle upon, use or occupy any portion of the said public park" and gave the Minister of the Interior and Governor in Council the right to make regulations for "the removal and exclusion of trespassers".

While these policies of forcible removal of Indigenous people on park lands were practised under the name of conservation, the government of Canada was simultaneously building permanent towns within parks to house tourists in early national parks such as Banff and Jasper.

=== Reintegration of cultural landscapes in National Parks Act ===
Since the early 1970s, Parks Canada has adopted more inclusive policies in the development of new national parks. Many of the changes within Parks Canada has been driven by legal precedent in Canada regarding Aboriginal title to land. The landmark Calder Case which eventually led to the development of the federal government's Comprehensive land claim process in particular pushed the Parks Canada Agency to enhance their relationship with Indigenous people in Canada .

The introduction of the first national park reserves by Parks Canada in 1972 signalled a shift in the agency's idea of Aboriginal rights within national parks. In 1974, the National Parks Act was further amended to include provisions for traditional hunting and fishing within national park reserves. This was the first time that Parks Canada had adopted the concept of cultural landscapes and park reserves became a new concept as land set out for a future national park pending the settlement of an unresolved land claim.

Section 40 of Canada National Parks Act (2000) stipulates the right of traditional harvesting by stating, "the application of this Act to a park reserve is subject to the carrying on of traditional renewable resource harvesting activities by aboriginal persons" (2000, c.32, s.40).

== Ecological integrity of national parks ==
Section 8(2) of the Canada National Parks Act (2000) outlines the maintenance or restoration of ecological integrity of national parks as the main priority for the Parks Canada Agency (though some have questioned Parks Canada's commitment to this pledge).

According to the Canada National Parks Act, ecological integrity within a national park is defined as "a condition that is determined to be characteristic of its natural region and likely to persist, including abiotic components and the composition and abundance of native species and biological communities, rates of change and supporting processes". This means that ecosystems are considered to have ecological integrity when their native components, such as physical elements, biodiversity and ecosystem processes, are intact.

In their 2016 Parks Report, the environmental organization, Canadian Parks and Wilderness Society (CPAWS), raised a concern about whether the Parks Canada Agency was effectively implementing the Canada National Parks Act's commitment to conservation. They highlighted that only 13% of the Parks Canada Agency's spending on national parks was dedicated to spending on conservation specifically. In response to such criticism, Environment and Climate Change Minister Catherine Mckenna promised a renewed focus of the Agency on conservation within parks with special attention to protecting ecological integrity and implementing more science-based decision-making.

A 2018 study by Environment and Climate Change Canada, found that, of 118 ecosystems assessed in 42 of the national parks, the majority of park ecosystems are in stable condition although freshwater and tundra ecosystems are experiencing the highest rates of poor ecological integrity with a declining trend.

== See also ==
- National Parks of Canada
