= National Bison Range herd =

The National Bison Range herd of American bison in Flathead Valley of the U.S. state of Montana consisted of about 300-500 of these animals. The management was transferred from the U.S. Fish and Wildlife Service to the Confederated Salish and Kootenai Tribes in 2021. Other large wildlife found on the CSKT Bison Range include elk, white-tail and mule deer, pronghorn, bighorn sheep and black bear.

== History ==
President Theodore Roosevelt established The National Bison Range in 1908 for the conservation of bison. The original herd was released into the park in 1909 after being purchased by the American Bison Society and subsequently donated to the refuge. It consisted of 40 bison. Thirty-four were bought from the Conrad Herd, two were donated by Alicia Conrad, one was received from Charles Goodnight in Texas, and three were received from the Corbin Herd.

== Population ==
The Population consists of 300-500 individuals. During a 2014 round-up 360 bison were counted, including 82 calves. Excess bison are either sold or donated as breeding stock and to contribute to other gene pools.
