= History of bison conservation in Canada =

Distribution of wood and plains bison populations in North America. 2003

Throughout the 18th and 19th centuries, the plains bison and wood bison in Canada were hunted by nomadic indigenous hunters and white hunters alike. By the 1880s, the bison was nearly extinct, spurring a movement to save the few herds that remained. Federal government wildlife policy evolved from preservation of wilderness to utilitarian, scientific conservation and management of bison populations.

Government preservation efforts began with the passing of the Unorganized Territories Game Preservation Act of 1894, which restricted legal hunting to certain times of the year. Bison herds were tracked down and moved to reserves where hunters were banned from operating.

In 1909, Buffalo National Park in Alberta was established with a herd of 300 plains bison. By 1916 more than 2,000 bison lived in the park, which was now overpopulated. As a result, many were moved to Wood Buffalo National Park in north-eastern Alberta (est. 1922). There, the plains bison and wood bison mingled and created a hybridized species of bison. The plains bison carried new diseases that were transmitted to the existing wood bison population.

When bison populations collapsed in the mid-19th century, Aboriginal groups that relied on the bison had to find new ways to support themselves. In the 20th century, the Canadian government's conservationist policies that restricted hunting and requisitioned land to preserve as national parks made it even more difficult for Aboriginals to remain self-sufficient. Ultimately, Canadian bison would go extinct and Aboriginals had to find other ways to survive.

Government efforts to conserve the bison are ongoing. Parks Canada has plans to reintroduce the plains bison to Banff National Park, in order to restore the species and to promote tourism. The commercial bison industry still breeds bison for food, which conflicts directly with wild bison conservation efforts. Approximately 500,000 bison live in North America today; only 20,000 of those are considered wild. Many activists believe that conservation efforts must go beyond simply increasing population size and focus on the restoration of the bison to its wild, undomesticated state.

== Historical decline of the North American bison population ==
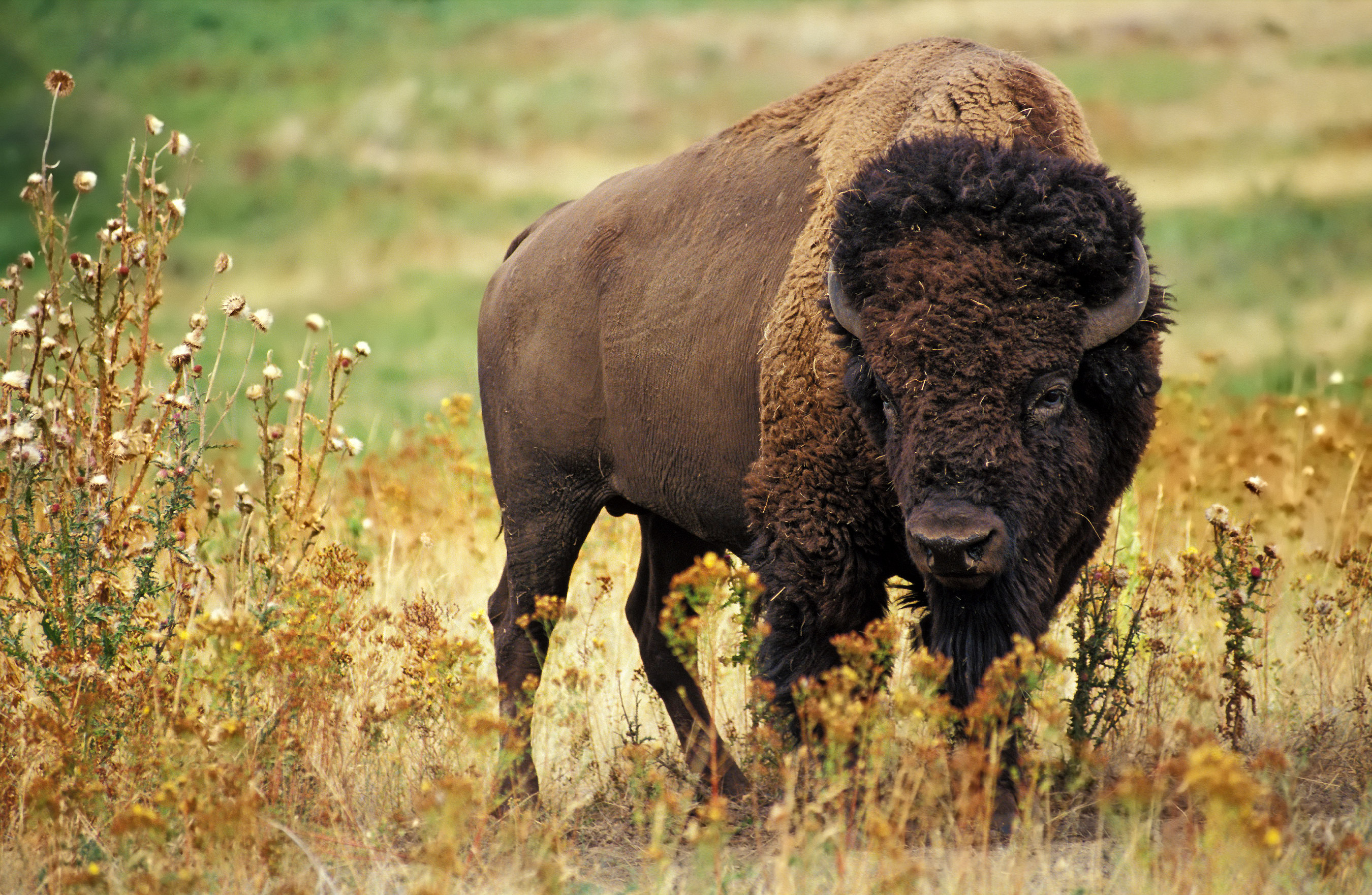
American plains bison

=== Plains bison ===
In the early 19th century, there were an estimated 30 million bison on the Great Plains. But profits in the lucrative robe trade stimulated overhunting of the plains bison by indigenous peoples and white settlers alike. The bison on the western plains were the last to be affected by white American expansionism, but by the 1850s even those herds had declined. Westward migration of domesticated animals and people destroyed grazing grounds, and drought and new diseases exacerbated the decline. The plight of the bison was largely seen as the superiority of man over nature until the early 19th century.

Historian Andrew Isenberg argues that the rise of capitalist ideology drove white hunters to compete for every last animal, and that a multitude of factors – disease, drought, westward expansion, commercialization and industrialization of hunting, colonialism, and the introduction of domestic animals from Europe – caused the near-extinction of the bison. Others note that the bison depletion was a problem of the tragedy of the commons, the opposite of capitalism: The bison were communal property, not private property, therefore they were abused and squandered for short-term gain that ultimately caused long-term problems, as no one person or group was responsible for maintaining a healthy population.

=== Wood bison ===
The majority of the world's wood bison herds are located in Northern Canada after a small herd of bison was discovered in the northern part of Wood Buffalo National Park. In 1965, 23 of these bison were relocated to the south side of Elk Island National Park. The 300 surviving there today are considered the most genetically pure wood bison remaining.

While there are many factors that have contributed to the decline of the wood bison, the most prominent are the over-hunting that took place in the 1800s; inadequate conservation methods, which failed to prevent hybridization with the plains bison and other species; and the spread of communicable diseases. Wood bison were largely over-hunted in the 1800s, and only a few hundred remained in Northern Alberta by the early 20th century. By 1957, wood bison were thought to have been finally extinct in Canada due to hybridization with the plains bison, which took place in Wood Buffalo National Park between 1925 and 1928.

As wood bison species became threatened with the hybridization, relocation and breeding conservation programs specific to wood bison were established in 1963. The population increased steadily. From the 1970s to the 1990s, however, the population began to decline again because of the spread of bovine tuberculosis. The disease had accompanied infected plains bison that were transferred to Wood Buffalo National Park. There the number of wood bison declined from 10,000 bison in the late 1960s to 2,200 bison by the late 1990s due to this process.

=== Social ecology ===
Aboriginal worldviews emphasize a connection among all life forms. Aboriginals had a reciprocal, sustainable relationship with the bison. Traditional governing structures ensured the continuity of resource use over time, allowing Aboriginals to adapt to frequent, unpredictable changes in the environment. In Canada, northern Aboriginals had a subsistence culture based on local hunting and trapping economies. The traditional hunting cultures of the Cree, Dene, and Inuit peoples came into direct conflict with the Canadian federal government's wildlife conservation programs. The Aboriginals' life on the land was impossible without access to animals for hunting.

Aboriginals of the Great Plains faced a choice in the 1700s: they could remain in their villages, cultivating food and trying to defend themselves against new Eurasian infectious diseases, or they could adapt to the white colonial economy and become nomadic bison hunters, selling bison robes, tongues and other parts in exchange for commodities. Many chose the latter option. For decades they profited from the bison trade. By the 1850s, however, the near-extinction of the bison had removed their livelihood, and many of these Aboriginal groups starved to death.

=== Shift in hunting practices ===
After the introduction of horses, newly nomadic First Nations groups could hunt bison more easily. In the nineteenth century, the bison hunt became highly commercialized and capitalistic, valuing quick profits over long-term sustainability. Isenberg argues that cultural and ecological interactions between Native Americans and Euroamericans in the Great Plains were responsible for the near-extinction of the bison. The new forms of bison hunters were mounted Indian nomads and Euroamerican industrial hidemen. These hunters, combined with environmental pressures, nearly extinguished the bison. Isenberg says that the Indian adoption of horses also led to competition with bison on the Plains for scarce water and forage. Industrialization played a role, with the expansion of railroads providing access into bison areas, commercial hunting (sometimes from the railcars), and the fur trade market.

=== Implications for preservation efforts ===
The first bison preservation efforts in Canada included the Unorganized Territories Game Preservation Act of 1894, through which the government legislated a closed season on the bison. This act was passed after naturalists conducted rough and largely inaccurate visual surveys of the bison population, concluding that the animal was in decline. From this assumption, naturalists created a more active federal wildlife administration in the Northwest Territories. The Wood Buffalo National Park was created in 1922 in response to Northern Canada's wildlife crisis.

== Origins of wildlife conservation in Canada ==
=== Ideological development of the wildlife conservation movement ===
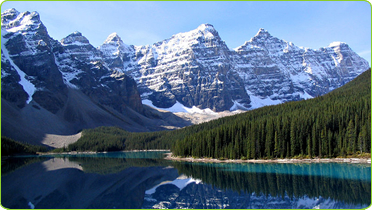
The Rocky Mountains Park Act in 1887 was modelled on the Yellowstone Park Act passed by the United States Congress in 1881.

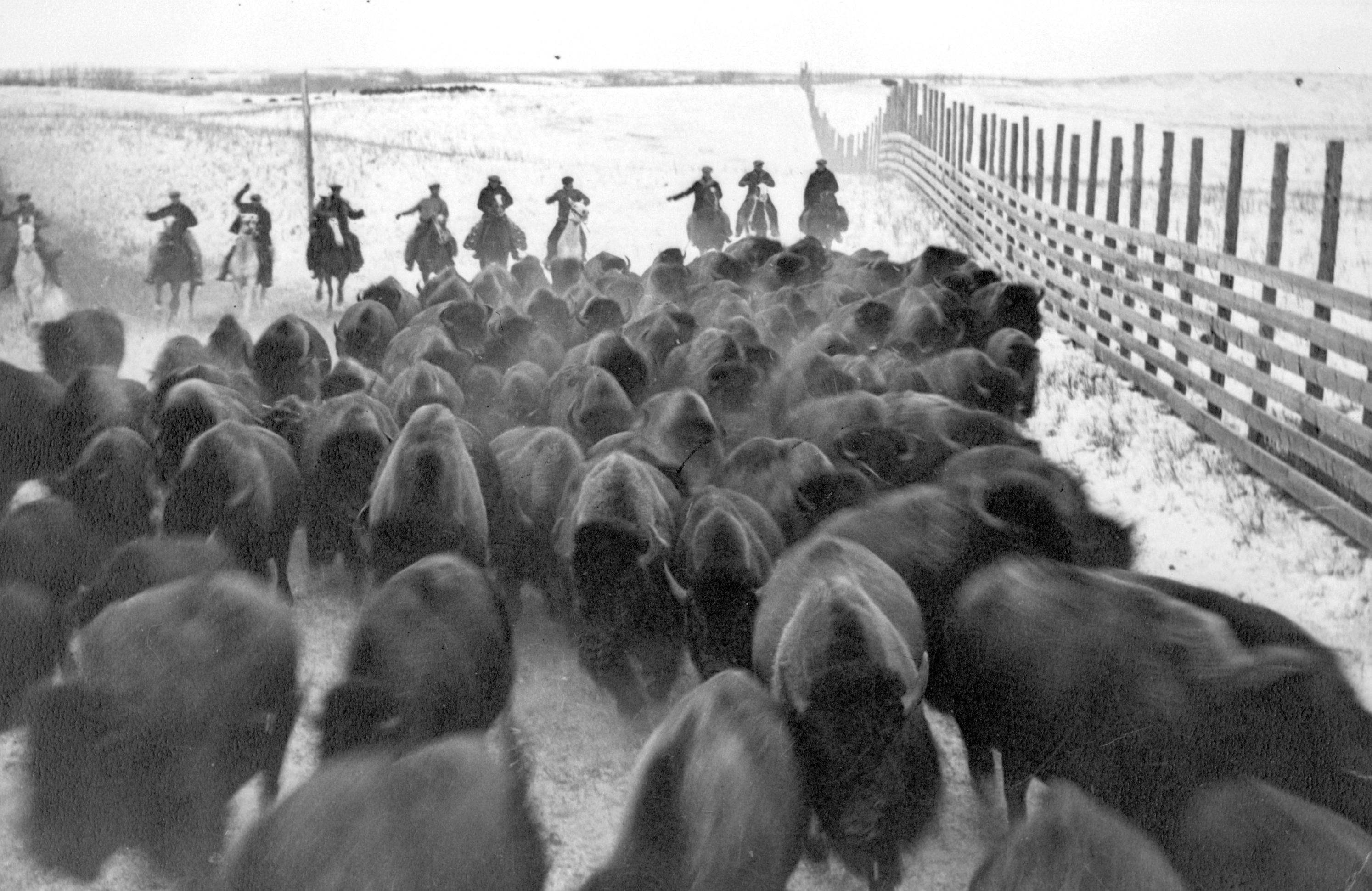
Transfer of plains bison into Wood Buffalo National Park in 1920s, which resulted in hybridization and the collapse of wood bison.

During most of the 19th century, wildlife preservation was not a goal of the federal government because of its belief in the superabundance of natural resources, the fact of wilderness frontiers, and a political climate that emphasized development and exploitation of land for human use. But the bison was the iconic species of the North American conservation movement, an animal that symbolized frontier wilderness. As its numbers declined, it was associated with the disappearing wild. Protecting the bison inspired conservation efforts in Canada, as did concerns for recreation and resource preservation. Canadian officials were also influenced by the growing movement in this period in the United States for wildlife conservation, for similar reasons.

Wildlife conservation in Canada also had a practical aspect: the government wanted to protect animals to develop tourism and recreation to parks. Howard Douglas, appointed superintendent of Rocky Mountains Park in 1897, began to preserve wildlife and try to increase their numbers to attract more visitors to the park.

Between 1900 and 1920, there was increasing public interest in parks, and a change from focusing on tourism to establishing the National Parks Branch. Canada had the world's first governmental organization dedicated to parks. Related governmental agencies were established, such as the Commission of Conservation. The Canadian Commission of Conservation, established in 1909, was intended as an independent body dealing with questions of natural resource conservation in Canada. In the early years of the commission, wildlife investigations were mostly focused on resource-commodity species, such as fish and fur-bearing animals. Later studies developed to include greater variety of species.

Further ideological development resulted in institutionalization of environmental protection. Several government civil servants promoted these goals, such as Robert Campbell, a Canadian Forestry Branch Director; Gordon Hewitt, a Dominion entomologist; and James Harkin, the first Parks Commissioner, who expressed strong conservationist philosophies. These bureaucrats actively sought administrative support from the government and intensively engaged in their own research to pass numerous environmental protection policies. Due to the efforts of Canadian government officials, the wildlife conservation movement became institutionalized and strengthened. While their personal experiences had shaped their efforts, they were also influenced by the neighboring experience in the United States: the loss of the frontier, the adverse effects of development causing decline in wildlife numbers, and the establishment and success of American national parks. James Harkin was especially influenced by American John Muir and his wilderness preservation theories. Both Harkin and Douglas were well aware of the developments in American wildlife protection movements.

Canadian society and government developed a greater awareness and sense of responsibility, leading to a wilderness consciousness and preservation ethic. The public supported government in protecting wildlife as an intrinsically valuable international resource, rather than simply a tourist attraction or commodity. Canada's wildlife conservation movement demonstrates how a small faction of dedicated civil servants transformed their own goals of preserving endangered species into active government policy.

== Evolution of federal government wildlife policy in Canada ==
=== From preservation to conservation ===
Preservation was the main focus of management up to World War II, which was accomplished by "feeding the bison, shooting carnivores that preyed on them, and patrolling for poachers." As early as the 1870s, western ranchers James McKay and William Alloway were capturing bison calves and raising them alongside their herds of cattle, effectively domesticating the bison. Some of these bison were sold in 1880 to Colonel Samuel Bedson, who let them roam the grounds of the Stony Mountain penitentiary in Manitoba.

In 1907, the federal government purchased Michel Pablo's herd of plains bison from Montana and transferred it to Buffalo National Park in Alberta as a response to the declining number of bison in Canada. The species was nearly extinct at this point and the park served as an ideal environment in which their numbers could and did grow.

In the post-war period, wildlife scientists began to recognize that the bison in the north could be exploited for national benefit. The attractions of wildlife and the wilderness were presented as factors to help increase economic development in the north. In 1947, the Dominion Wildlife Service (Later known as Canadian Wildlife Service or CWS) was created to centralize wildlife research infrastructure within the federal government. Canadian biologist William Fuller conducted a study for the Wildlife Service that demonstrated that tuberculosis found among the hybridized bison in the north helped maintain stable numbers in the park. The management plan for 1954 included systematic, periodic slaughter of selected bison to control numbers.

=== Goals ===
Through the Unorganized Territories Game Preservation Act of 1894, the federal government enforced a closed season on the bison. The plains bison were near extinction in Canada and with these efforts the government hoped to preserve them from the Aboriginal hunters. However, preservation efforts were not only for recreational purposes. After the Second World War, the bison were used for commercial purposes as well.

As the numbers of bison increased, the federal government issued licenses to regulate the number of bison and bring in revenue. Aboriginal people were excluded from national parks, not for the sake of preserving wilderness, but in the "interests of game conservation, sport hunting, tourism, and Indian assimilation." This represented a shift in federal wildlife policy goals from preservation of wilderness to the commercialization and commodification of the national parks. Aboriginals were excluded from Banff National Park in Alberta to serve the goals of conservationists and sportsmen.

Maintenance of traditional Aboriginal hunting practices were seen to conflict with the contemporary goals of the Department of Indian Affairs to assimilate Aboriginal people. Beginning in the 1880s, Aboriginals were encouraged to abandon hunting in favour of subsistence farming, then common among Euro-Canadians. Thus, the goal of the federal government was to create an environment with an abundance of wildlife attractions for sports hunting and tourism, and to assimilate Aboriginal people into Euro-Canadian society.

=== Bison Management Policy ===
The preservation of the wood bison in northern Canada was implied by the strict federal control of traditional Aboriginal hunting practices through the creation of a wildlife sanctuary. The federal government proposed large-scale ranching and breeding plans for bison herds. Preservationist approaches to the bison in the north implied the assertion of federal power over the bison which had been under the control of Aboriginal hunters for generations. There was no role for the human use of nature.

In 1952 and 1954, there was a shortage of mature adult male bison, and managers ordered slaughtering of more female and young bison to meet numerical goals. Wildlife managers were disturbed by these actions, which threatened the future of the herd. CWS biologist Nick Novakowsi argued that the bison was declining due to slaughtering, along with the effects of flooding in their habitat. There was conflict between the management at the Wood Buffalo Park and the federal government. The park management did not consider reducing the bison herd to be useful for population stabilization, but described it as "mass murder."

The federal government's goal of commercializing the use of bison throughout Canada undermined the need to provide inexpensive bison meat to the local population in northern Canada. With new agreements with meatpackers in the south, combined with their prior commitment to the Hudson's Bay Company and Indian Affairs, over nine hundred bison were slaughtered. Through the agreement, the packing companies received top quality bison meat for low prices, while northern Canada got tough meat that was sold at higher prices. CWS biologists feared that there was no scientific legitimacy to the slaughtering of the nine hundred bison, many which did not have tuberculosis. In the winter of 1957- 1958, the testing and slaughtering program of the bison was established.

In the late 1980s, there was a debate on the outbreak of tuberculosis and brucellosis at Wood Buffalo Park discussing whether the diseased bison should be replaced. A committee was established in 1986 to discuss the possibilities of action and suggested: "maintenance of the status quo, fencing of the park boundary, a combination of fences and buffer zones near the park boundary and the complete eradication of the hybridized park bison with replacement by a disease-free herd of wood bison." This caused a debate between Environment Canada, who was in favour of the eradication, and Wood Buffalo National Park staff, who opposed it. The park staff argued that the risk of the diseased bison infecting cattle was overstated and that it was to justify using the bison for commercial purposes. Due to the opposition the diseased bison were not slaughtered.

=== Social, cultural, and political forces ===
Aboriginals opposed the creation of the Wood Buffalo National Park in 1922 and continued to protest their opposition even after it was established. With the creation of the park, non-treaty Aboriginals were removed and the treaty Aboriginals were allowed to continue to hunt under strict regulation by the park staff. Aboriginal hunting cultures were not taken into consideration when these laws were enforced, instead the preservation of the bison was a bigger concern to the federal government. After 1945, government wildlife workers became interested in developing the North and realized the economic benefits that the bison could provide them. CWS biologist William Fuller, in his study of the bison infected with tuberculosis, provided the federal government with the justification it needed to slaughter the bison for commercial and economic purposes.

=== Long-term implications ===
According to historian John Sandlos, several historical forces converged in shaping wildlife conservation in northern Canada: "the disdain among conservationists for traditional hunting cultures, the authoritarian approach of the state to wildlife conservation, the rise of scientific knowledge," and a broader "modernization agenda in the region". Federal wildlife officials combined the philosophies of wildlife preservation and utilitarian conservation, "arguing for the salvation of the bison based on the contradictory images of a wilderness [frontier] and a semipastoral landscape".

== National Parks ==
=== Buffalo National Park ===
Buffalo National Park, established in 1909 in Wainwright, Alberta, received its first shipment of 325 bison on June 16, 1909, which were transferred from Elk Island National Park. The national park was created to preserve the plains bison that were on the brink of extinction in the mid-1880s, due mostly to systematic slaughter, increased settlement, and technological advances in hunting practices. After the arrival of numerous shipments, the bison population at Buffalo National Park increased rapidly and exceeded 2,000 by 1916, resulting in the largest bison herd in the world. The rapid growth of the bison population suggested that the project was a success. But managers had little information about, or precedent for, efficient ways to preserve and develop wild animal populations other than in the mountain parks.

In contrast, the transfer of plains bison from the overpopulated range in Buffalo National Park to the understocked range in Wood Buffalo National Park resulted in hybridization between the species. The northern herds became infected by tuberculosis and brucellosis carried by the plains bison, and the wood bison declined. Not until the 1930s did park and wildlife managers begin to study the relationships within species and with their environment, and to develop understanding of carrying capacity. The park area incorporated relatively poor agricultural land; coupled with overpopulation, the range degraded and disease was spread more easily among the bison. Experiments such as crossbreeding bison and domestic cattle, and commercializing the herd were unsuccessful. The Canadian Parks Branch lacked sufficient funding to run the park or to remedy the crises the bison faced. After deciding to close the park in 1939, the Department of National Defence (Canada) repurposed the area for military training. The bison disappeared once again. But during its thirty-one years of activity, Buffalo National Park played an important role in saving the plains bison from extinction.

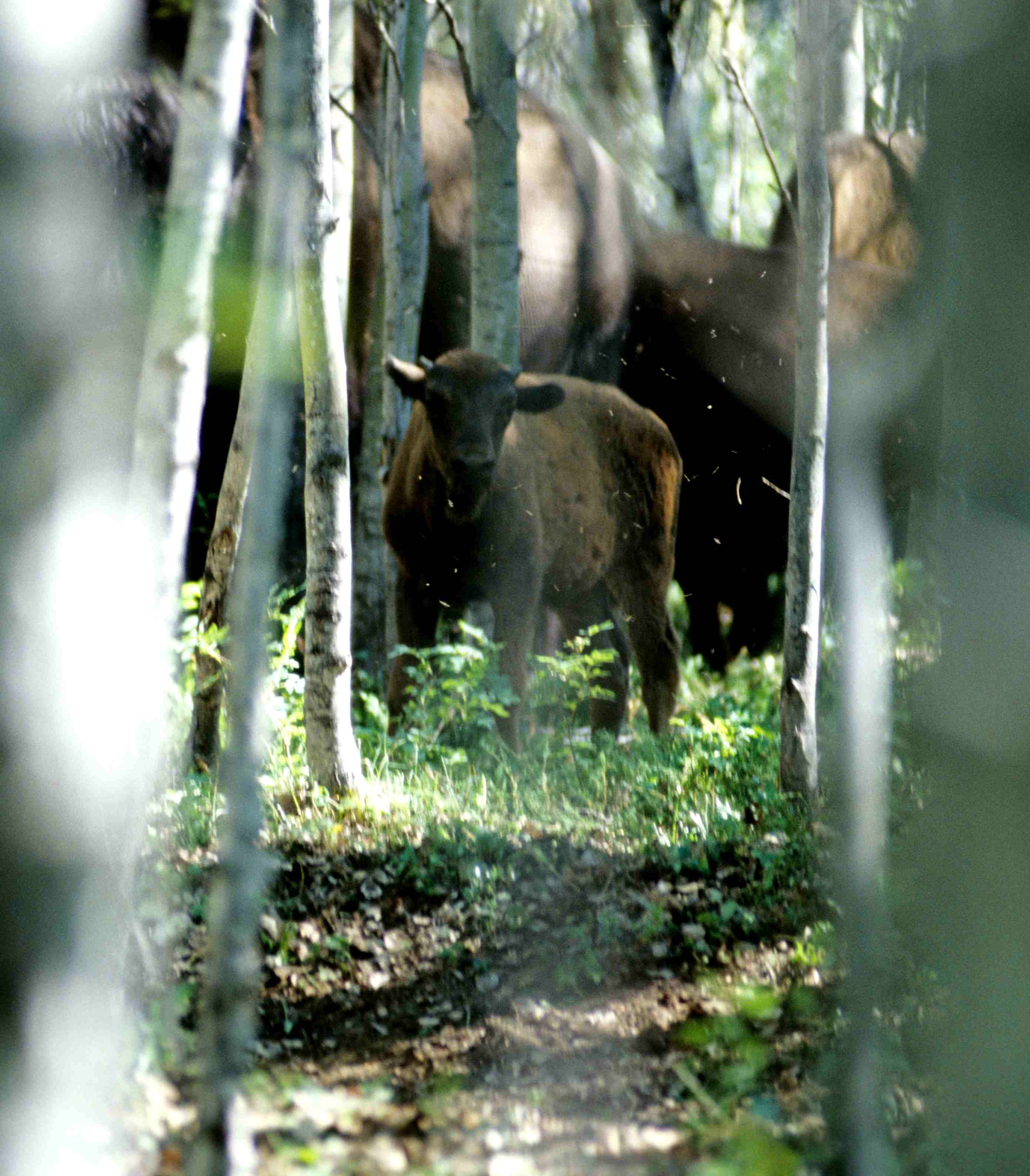
Wood bison in the forests of Wood Buffalo National Park.

=== Wood Buffalo National Park ===
Wood Buffalo National Park, established in 1922 in northeastern Alberta and the southern portion of The Northwest Territories, is North America's largest national park, at 44,800 km^{2}. It served to protect herds of bison that had dropped in numbers from an estimated 40 million in 1830 to less than 1000 by 1900. Despite harboring bovine diseases such as tuberculosis and brucellosis, the introduced and resident population increased to somewhere between 10,000 and 12,000 by 1934. The bison population reached 12,500 to 15,000 by the late 1940s and early 1950s.

But, by 1998, Parks Canada documented that the population had decreased to approximately 2,300. This decline was due to various factors such as slaughters, cessation of wolf poisoning, round-ups for disease control, floods, diseases, predation, and habitat changes. These significant declines, as well as the elimination of existing pure-strain bison, resulted in major political debate on the future of bison in the park and dealing with contagious bovine diseases seen to threaten commercial herds. In August 1990, a review panel supported by the federal government recommended introduction of disease-free wood bison from Elk Island National Park and potentially elsewhere, but there was a quick and negative public response, and no action was taken. From 1996 to 2001, a 5-year Bison Research and Containment Program (BRCP) was conducted to assess the prevalence and effects of brucellosis and tuberculosis on the bison population of Wood Buffalo National Park. To understand the changing dynamics of this particular ecosystem, multiple research studies continue to this day.

== Interactions between Aboriginals and government officials ==
=== Historical conflicts over bison ===
The Canadian federal government's wildlife conservation programs conflicted with the traditional hunting cultures of the Cree, Dene, and Inuit. They traveled on a nomadic, seasonal basis to hunt bison across large territories. As the government became more involved in managing the bison, there were conflicts about access and issues of Aboriginal subsistence vs. commodity production.

These conflicts occurred between Aboriginal hunters, government officials, and park administrators due to each group's divergent approaches to wildlife resource management. The utilitarian, scientific conservation approach employed by federal bison management programs was incompatible with the traditional hunting cultures of northern Aboriginals. The Cree, Dene, and Inuit communities that hunted and trapped in Wood Buffalo Park formally resisted government policy by writing letters, signing petitions, and boycotting treaty payments. Less formally, many Aboriginal hunters simply refused to obey the wildlife laws, exercising their traditional treaty right to hunt bison.

=== Assertion of state control over Aboriginal hunters ===
The 1894 Unorganized Territories Game Preservation Act introduced regulations that severely limited the ability of the Cree, Dene, and Inuit to access wildlife on their traditional territories. By the 1920s, Aboriginals were excluded from hunting and trapping grounds contained in Wood Buffalo National Park. The establishment of a game warden service in the park allowed for direct surveillance and supervisory control over Aboriginal hunters. As a result, the most basic elements of the Aboriginal subsistence cycle, including seasonal movements, fur trapping, and the gathering of food, were redefined as criminal activities through federal game regulations. According to historian John Sandlos, attitudes towards Cree, Dene, and Inuit hunters were socially constructed and flawed due to observer bias, racial stereotyping, and inaccurate reporting by park officials. Furthermore, Sandlos emphasizes that incidents of wildlife overkill does not undermine the right or ability of Aboriginal hunters to manage local bison populations in partnership with government experts.

According to Sandlos, the introduction of national parks and game regulations was central to the assertion of state authority over the traditional hunting cultures of the Cree, Dene, and Inuit. Sandlos argues that the early wildlife conservation movement was shaped by the "civilizing ideology" of the Canadian government's colonial agenda. The presence of Aboriginal hunters in the Northwest Territories was considered detrimental to the government's utilitarian and scientific approach to wildlife management, which was designed to produce a surplus of bison which could then be exploited as commodities. Federal wildlife officials portrayed Aboriginal hunters as having a destructive influence on bison populations, which legitimized the assertion of state control over the subsistence cultures of the Cree, Dene, and Inuit. The cultural stereotype that viewed Aboriginal hunting practices as reckless, immoral, and wasteful became firmly entrenched within bison conservation programs. Federal officials viewed Aboriginal hunters as a threat to their wildlife management and development schemes for the north, and therefore, subjected them to regulation and control.

=== Social, cultural, political, and economic implications for Aboriginals ===
The proposed bison ranching schemes in Wood Buffalo National Park required a complete transformation of the economic and social lives of Dene and Inuit hunters. The intensive management of bison for the purposes of commodity production entailed the introduction of capitalism, marginalization of the local hunting and trapping economy, and conversion of Aboriginal hunters into wage labourers. Federal wildlife officials hoped that the introduction of a northern ranching economy would persuade Aboriginals to give up hunting and trapping in favour of more stable, productive lives as labourers or ranchers. By the 1950s, state policies controlled nearly every aspect of the social, cultural, and material lives of northern Aboriginals. While many Aboriginals were encouraged to assimilate into the modern industrial economy, others became dependent wards of the state through relocation onto reservations or re-education in residential schools. The lack of control over traditional territories and subsistence food resources became a political issue, impacting Aboriginal self-determination, cultural continuity, and health status.

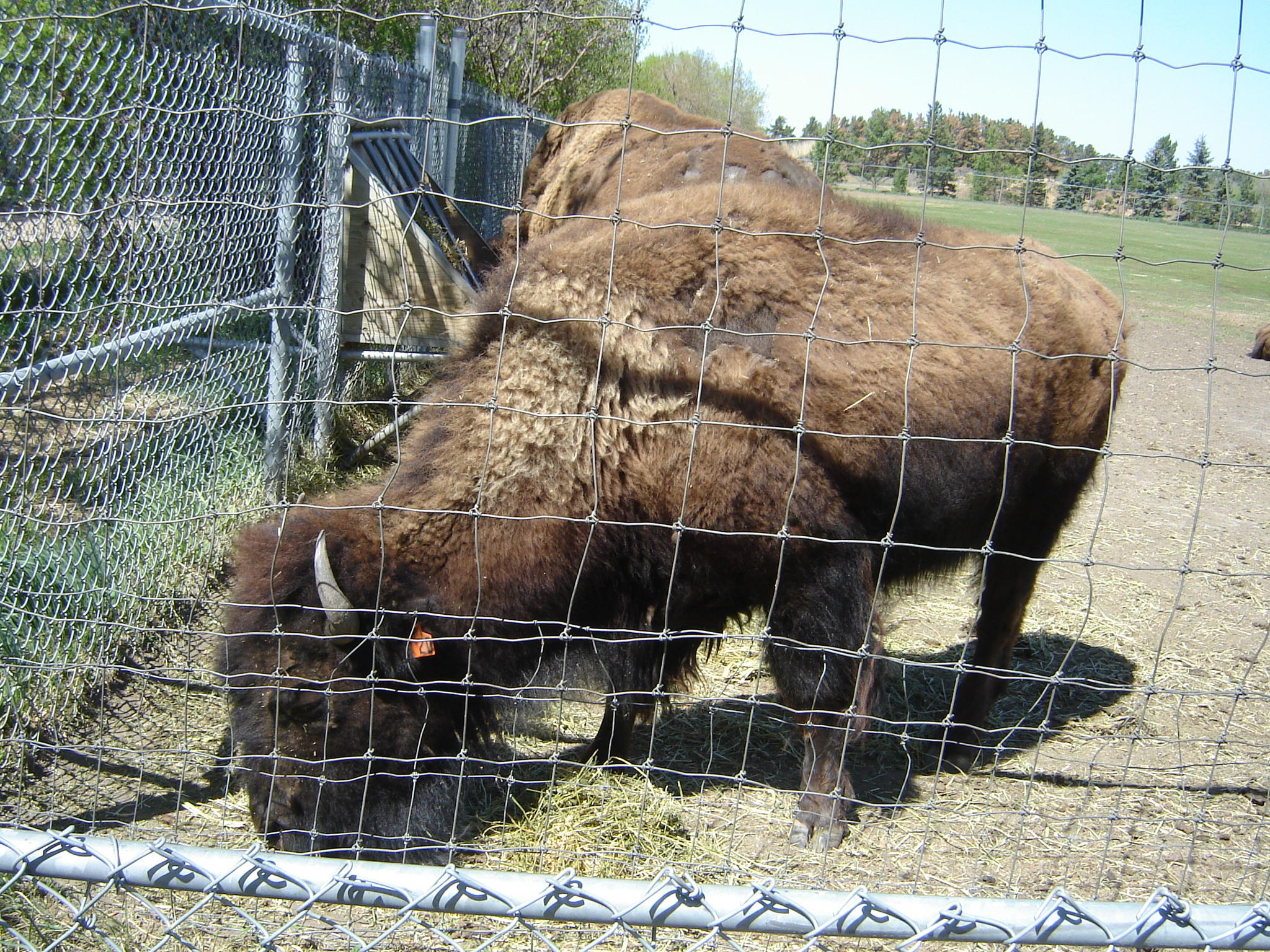
Domesticated bison at the Plains Bison Forestry Farm. Early conservation efforts were undermined by the federal government's goal of domesticating northern bison populations for commercial purposes.

=== Interactions on the Great Plains ===
Many Aboriginal groups had become nomadic bison hunters in response to Euroamerican westward expansion and economic development, which had made the robe trade highly lucrative. The collapse of the bison population on the Great Plains eliminated the primary source of wealth of these groups in addition to destroying their lands and livelihoods. While white and indigenous hunters both contributed to the culling of the bison population, white hunters tended to be far more destructive in their hunting techniques. While Aboriginal hunting groups participated in the bison hunt in order to support themselves, Euroamericans were actively trying to clear the plains of bison populations to make way for settlers and domesticated animals.

=== Ecological implications for bison populations ===
Early conservation efforts to preserve the iconic bison were ultimately undermined by the federal government's goal of domesticating northern bison populations for commercial purposes. The utilitarian, scientific approach to bison management prevented the state from comprehending the complexity of local ecosystems and human cultures. The narrow focus on production resulted in poor federal wildlife management decisions, such as the transfer of thousands of plains bison from the overpopulated range in Buffalo National Park to the supposedly understocked range in Wood Buffalo National. The transfer had disastrous ecological consequences, including hybridization between the plains and wood bison species and the infection of the northern herds with tuberculosis and brucellosis.

== Contemporary bison conservation ==
=== Current efforts ===
Contemporary bison conservation is informed by the legacy of historical efforts by the Canadian federal government. Parks Canada plans to reintroduce a breeding population of the extirpated plains bison to Banff National Park. Goals include conservation of the plains bison, a native keystone species, as well as ecological restoration, inspiring discovery, and providing an "authentic national park experience." According to Parks Canada, the bison remains "emblematic of the wild Canadian west." The American Prairie in Montana is restoring the native prairie ecosystem and expanding their bison herds. Plains bison were initially transferred to the reserve from the Elk Island National Park in Alberta.

Despite the development of co-management regimes and increased Aboriginal participation in the wildlife policy process, the colonial legacy of the state management era still lingers. These current bison conservation initiatives do not discuss Aboriginal use of subsistence resources in national parks and reserves. It is unclear whether Aboriginal participation and Traditional Ecological Knowledge will be incorporated into reintroduction plans. Although the Cree and Dene are now recognized as official participants in the management of wildlife and protected areas, Sandlos argues that this "tentative shift in political power represents an incomplete attempt to decolonize wildlife management practices in the North." The weak powers given to Aboriginal people on wildlife advisory boards allow the state to maintain political authority over wildlife resources, while giving the appearance of a participatory consensus-building approach with Aboriginal hunters. Sandlos suggests that the advisory nature of co-management boards is based on the implicit colonial assumption that local Aboriginal resource management systems are deficient, and that the role of the state is essential to the formation of wildlife policy in Canada's north.

Current bison conservation efforts face numerous social and ecological challenges, due to the history of early preservation methods that conducted species conservation at the expense of ecological function. Today, conservation groups are increasingly focusing on preservation of bison a native species and conducting research to prove their status as endangered animals. The IUCN Bison Specialist Group is currently completing a new status assessment and conducting a review to determine if the species should be red-listed as threatened or endangered. Non-profit groups such as Nature Conservancy Canada's Old-Man-on-His-Back Preserve in Saskatchewan are creating conservation herds in the Cypress Hills, while private sector groups such as Turner Enterprises are separating cattle-gene-free herds. Additionally, Aboriginal efforts are underway to create tribal wildlife reserves with wild bison populations.

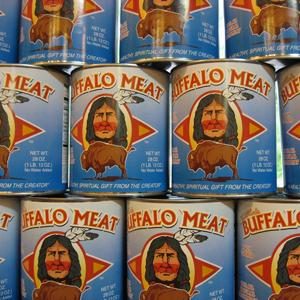
Bison meat is now sold commercially throughout North America.

=== Commercial bison industry ===
The commercial bison industry breed bison for food which can conflict with conservation strategies. Due to the industry's view of bison as a commodity, the role of the bison as an important species for the ecology of grassland ecosystems remains largely theoretical. By the 1960s, wildlife preservation efforts had transformed into a bison ranching industry, and many parks in Canada were almost indistinguishable from the agricultural operations that surrounded them. The bison, the same animal that symbolized the disappearing wild, was transformed into "meat" by the very institutions that had been instrumental to its rescue and preservation.

Many of the bison herds have become hybridized with cattle species, due to commercial efforts to create "cattalo" during the period when bison numbers were very low in the late 1800s and early 1900s. as of 2011, there is a total 400,000 plains bison in North America, only about 20,000 are considered "wildlife." As such statistics show, contemporary bison conservation is more complicated than simple efforts to increase the species' population; modern conservation measures need to focus on returning the bison to its wild state through the restoration of native prairie ecosystems. The Canadian Bison Association (CBA), an organization composed of over 1,500 producers and 250,000 bison, are working in cooperation with numerous conservation groups to develop strategies to help return bison to its natural, wild state.

== Public education and interpretation ==
Parks Canada has developed public programming around its bison conservation efforts at Elk Island and other parks. This was expanded into a book titled Like Distant Thunder: Canada’s Bison Conservation Story by heritage interpreter Lauren Markewicz, available in print or for free on Parks Canada's website.

== See also ==
- Buffalo Treaty
