= American Bison Society =

Organization to help save the bison

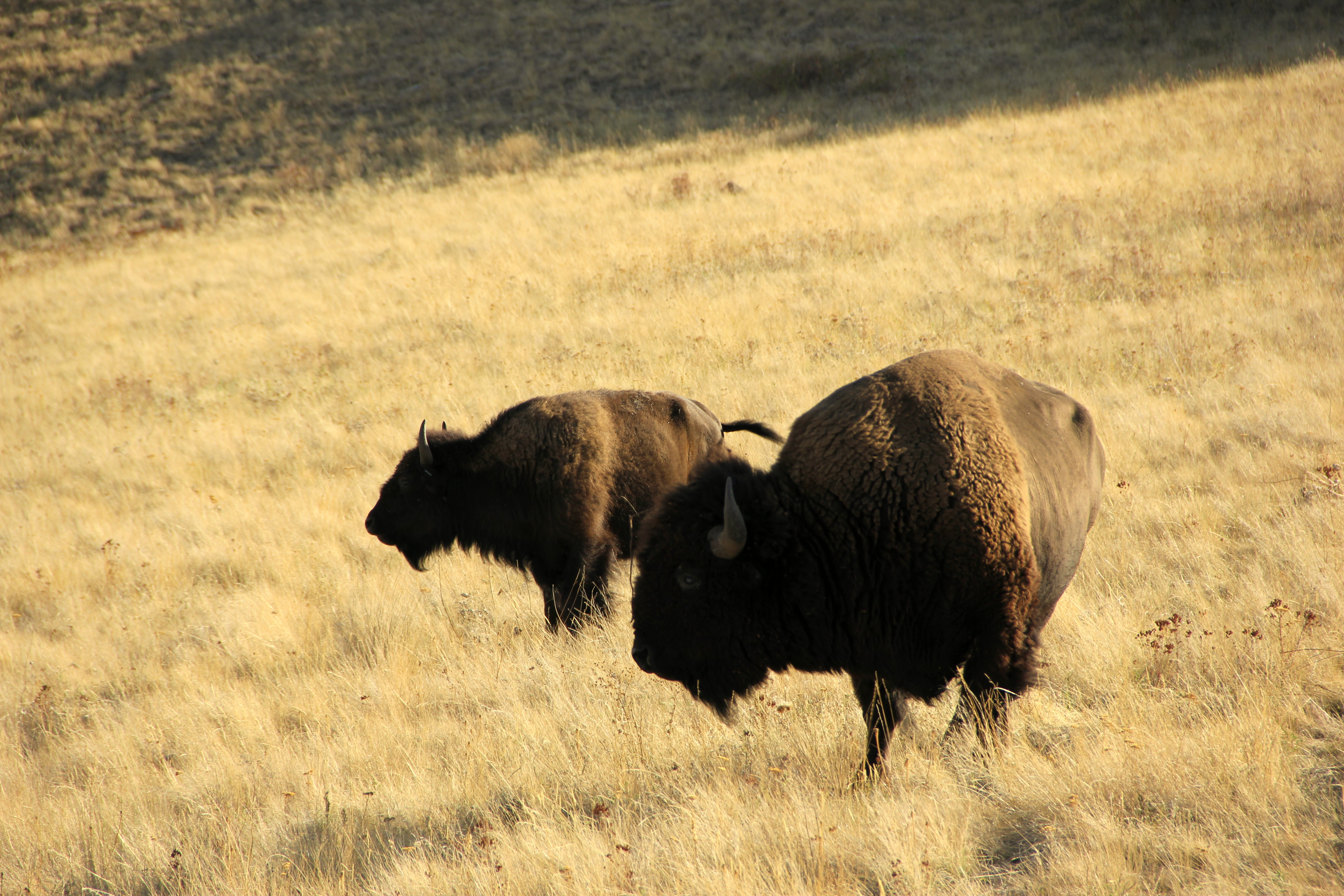
- American bison ranging at the National Bison Range in western Montana, established by the petitioning and fundraising of the American Bison Society
- Abbreviation: ABS
- Formation: 1905 (reestablished 2005)
- Founder: New York Zoological Society
- Dissolved: 1935
- Type: Conservation organization
- Purpose: Protection and restoration of the American bison
- Region served: North America
- Parent organization: Wildlife Conservation Society (since 2005)

The American Bison Society (ABS) was a conservation organization founded in 1905 by the New York Zoological Society to help save the bison from extinction and raise public awareness about the species by pioneering conservationists and sportsmen including Ernest Harold Baynes (the Society's first secretary), William T. Hornaday, Madison Grant and Theodore Roosevelt.

Over 40 million American bison (Bison bison) once roamed the plains and grasslands from Mexico to central Canada, shaping the landscape with their migrations, grazing patterns, and behavior. By the 1870s, their populations had been decimated by westward expansion and over-hunting. An 1889 survey published by Hornaday, who would go on to become the first director of the Bronx Zoo, showed that approximately 1,000 bison remained in North America.

== History ==
The American Bison Society was formed to prevent the extinction of the American bison. In 1907, the ABS shipped 15 bison from the Bronx Zoo to the Wichita Mountains Wildlife Refuge and Game Preserve in Oklahoma by cart and rail. This was the first animal reintroduction in North America. In 1908, following successful petitioning by ABS, the US Congress passed a bill to establish a permanent National Bison Range in Montana, provided that ABS raise the $10,000 needed to purchase the animals for the herd. They exceeded this fundraising goal, and in 1909, these animals were released on the new national range. In 1913, the New York Zoological Society (now the Wildlife Conservation Society), working with ABS, donated 14 bison to Wind Cave National Park in South Dakota, and ABS assisted in founding the herd at Fort Niobrara National Wildlife Refuge in Nebraska. Because of the secure populations of bison in these public herds, the ABS considered their work done, and the organization was disbanded in 1935.

In 2005, the American Bison Society was re-launched by the Wildlife Conservation Society (WCS) to secure the ecological future of bison in North America.

On August 12, 2010, National Geographic published a progress report on the Wood Bison Recovery Program at Alaska Wildlife Conservation Center that is supported in part by WCS - North America.

== Archival Records ==
The Wildlife Conservation Society holds the William T. Hornday records, which contain all his ingoing and outgoing correspondence during his time as President of the ABS.

== See also ==
- American bison (Bison bison)
- Bison hunting
- Bison
- Buffalo Commons
- Conservation of American bison
- European bison
- Great bison belt
- Steppe Bison
- Wisent
- Wood bison
- Yellowstone Park bison herd
