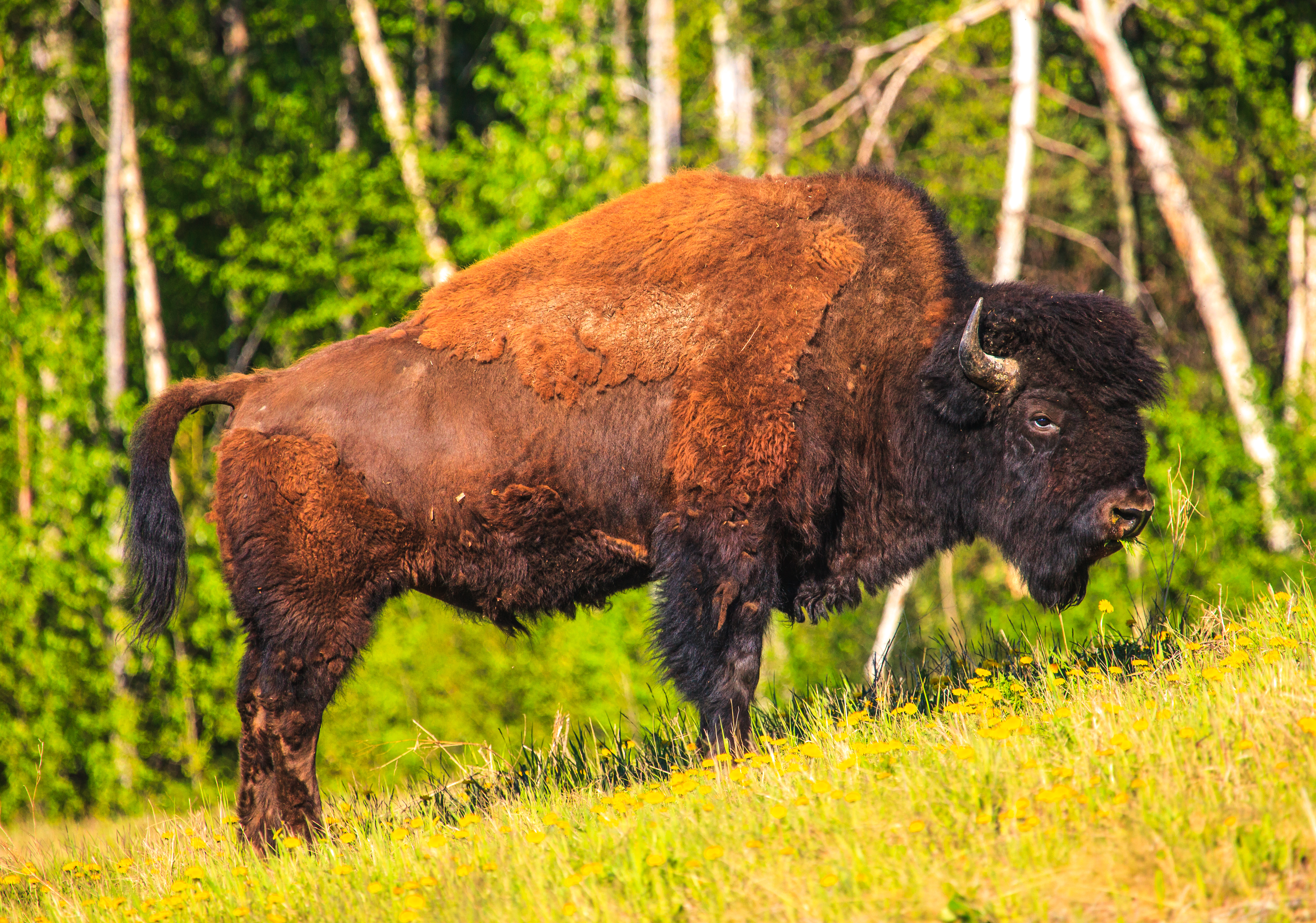
- A wood bison near Watson Lake, Yukon, Canada

Conservation status
- Vulnerable (NatureServe)

- Threatened (ESA)

Scientific classification
- Kingdom: Animalia
- Phylum: Chordata
- Class: Mammalia
- Order: Artiodactyla
- Family: Bovidae
- Subfamily: Bovinae
- Genus: Bos
- Subgenus: Bison
- Species: B. bison
- Subspecies: B. b. athabascae

Trinomial name
- Bison bison athabascae Rhoads, 1897
- IUCN range of the two American bison subspecies. Plains bison (Bison bison subsp. bison) Wood bison (Bison bison subsp. athabascae)

Synonyms
- Bison priscus athabascae

= Wood bison =

Wood bison Temporal range: Late Pleistocene – recent

Subspecies of American bison

The wood bison (Bison bison athabascae) or mountain bison (often called the wood buffalo or mountain buffalo), and Athabaskan bison (or Athabaskan buffalo), is a distinct northern subspecies or ecotype of the American bison. Its original range included much of the boreal forest regions of Alaska, Yukon, western Northwest Territories, northeastern British Columbia, northern Alberta, and northwestern Saskatchewan. An attempt is ongoing to introduce them into the wilderness of Eurasia by Sakha Republic of Russia.

Pure-bred wood bison were believed to be extinct after the late 1920s as a result of intermixing with plains bison in Wood Buffalo National Park, then believed to be their last refuge. A nearly pure herd was found in 1957 in an isolated portion of the park. Herds called the Firebag River and Ronald Lake herds potentially have had no contact with the Wood Buffalo National Park herd.

== Name ==
Some consider the word "buffalo" to be a misnomer for this animal, as it is only distantly related to either of the two "true buffalo", the water buffalo and the African buffalo, but "bison" is a Greek word meaning an ox-like animal, while "buffalo" originated with the French fur trappers who called these massive beasts bœufs, meaning ox or bullock—so both names, "bison" and "buffalo", have a similar meaning. Though the name "bison" might be considered to be more scientifically correct, the name "buffalo" is listed in many dictionaries as an acceptable alternative for American bison. In reference to this animal, the term "buffalo" dates to 1635 in North American usage when the term was first recorded for the American mammal. It thus has a longer history than the term "bison", which was first recorded in 1774.

The "eastern bison" (B. b. pennsylvanicus) from the eastern United States, a junior synonym of B. b. bison had been called "wood(s) bison" or "woodland bison", not referring to B. b. athabascae.

== Taxonomy ==
The name Bison bison athabascae was proposed by Samuel Rhoads for a bison southwest of the Great Slave Lake. This specimen was examined by J. Macoun and H. A. Ward.

== Description ==
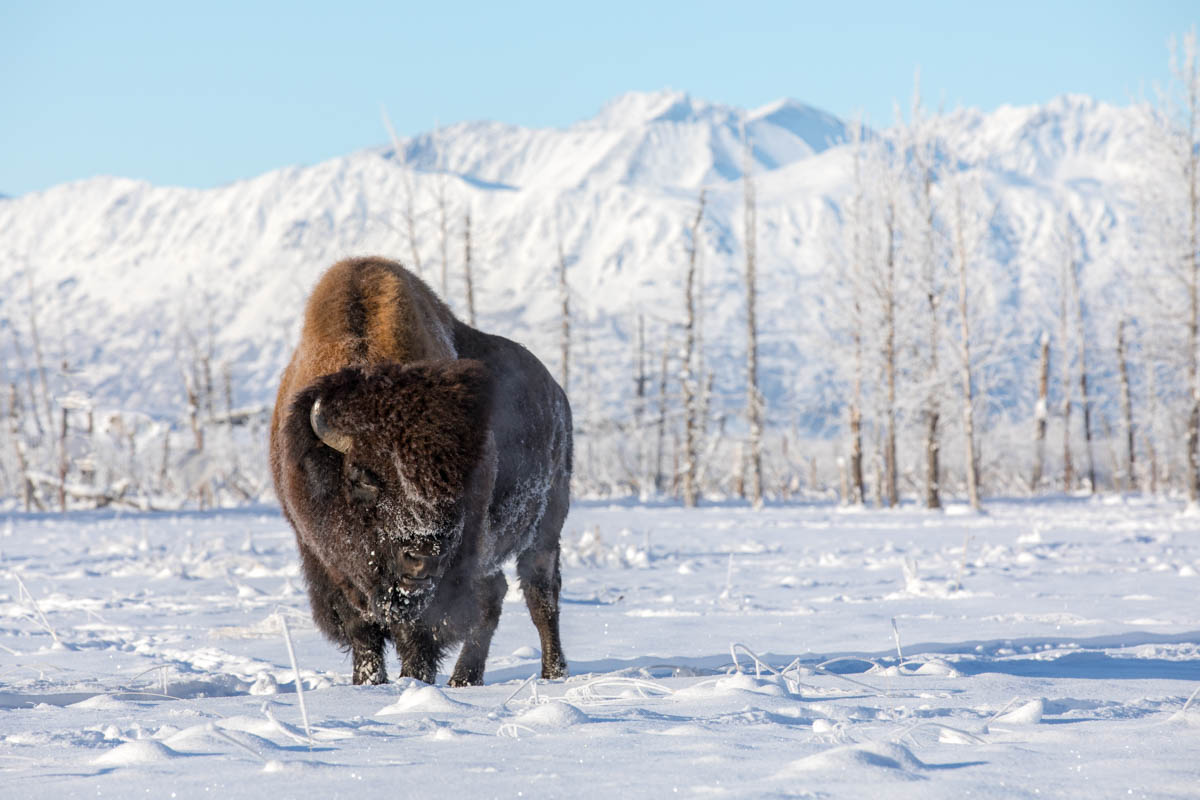
A bull at Alaska Wildlife Conservation Center

The wood bison is potentially more primitive in phenotype than the plains bison (Bison bison bison), while the latter probably evolved from a mixing of Bison occidentalis and Bison antiquus. Existences of pure or near-pure animals preserving the original phenotypes prior to the 1920s are yet to be confirmed.

The wood bison is larger and heavier than the plains bison, and is among the largest extant bovids, being the heaviest and longest extant terrestrial animal in North America and Siberia. Large males have been recorded to reach 3.35 m (11.0 ft) in body length with 95 cm (3.12 ft) tails, 201 cm (6.59 ft) tall at withers, and 1,179 kg (2,600 lb) in weight, but wood bison body condition measures for 31 adult wood bison weight according to age and sex. As a result, the average weight of five male wood bison over 8.4 years old was recorded as 513 kg, the average weight of 20 female wood bison over 5.4 years old was recorded as 487 kg, and the average weight of five female wood bison over 6.6 years old was recorded as 443 kg. making it morphologically more similar to at least one of the chronological subspecies of ancestral steppe bison (Bison priscus sp.) and Bison occidentalis.

The peak of the wood bison's shoulder hump sits anterior to the forelegs, while the plains bison's shoulder hump is located directly above the forelegs. Wood bison also have larger horn cores, darker and woollier hair, and less hair on their forelegs, with smaller and more pointed beards. Plains bison are capable of running faster, reaching up to 65 km/h (40 mph), and longer than bison living in the forests and mountains.

== Reproduction and behavior ==
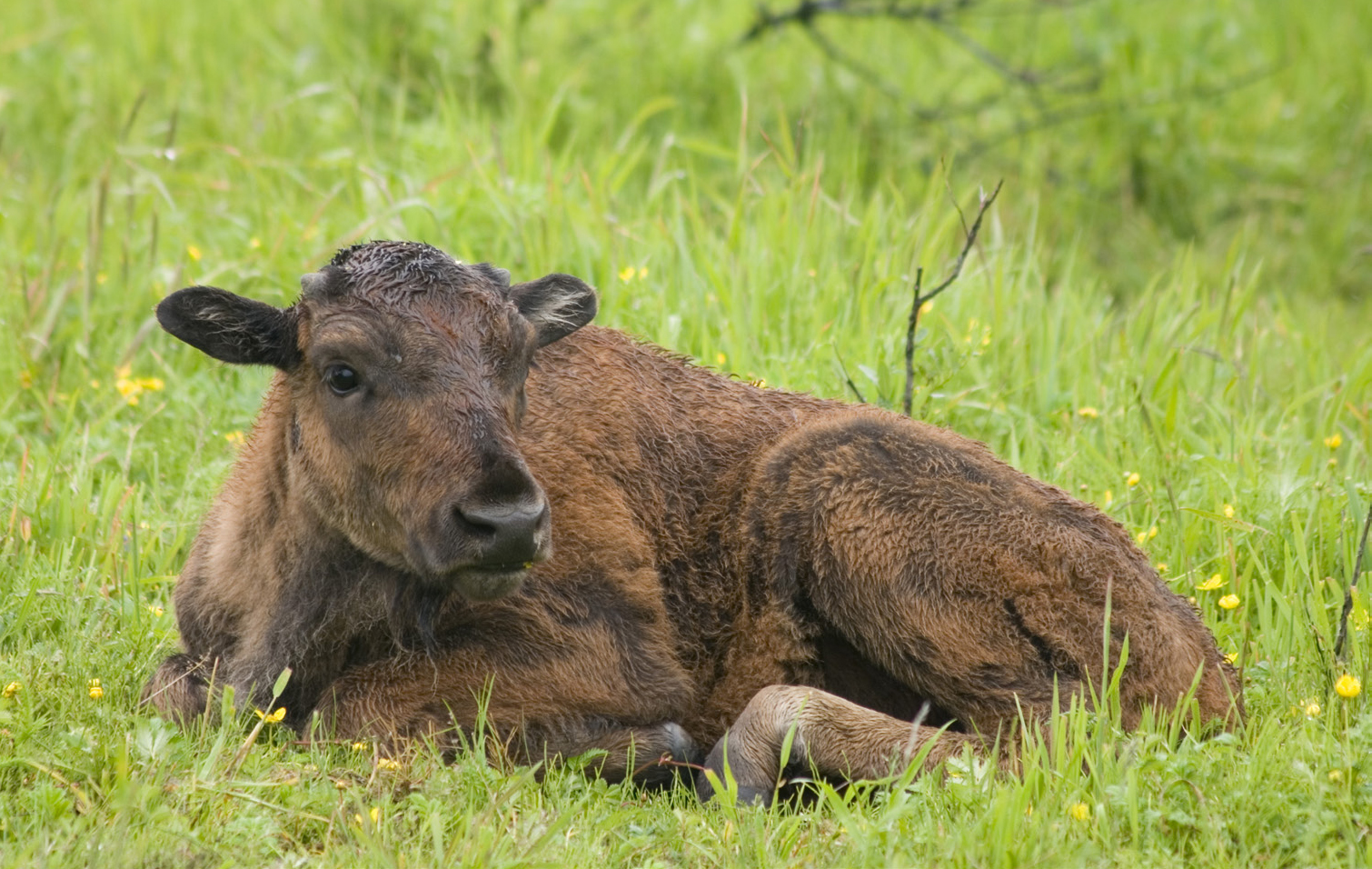
A yearling calf.

Wood bison reach sexual maturity at age two. Females often rear their first calf by age three and may produce a single additional offspring every 1–2 years. Mating season typically runs from July to September, with most activity occurring during August, as evidenced by the fact most calves are born in May following a 9-month gestation. Bison young are precocial, with many mastering the skills required to evade predators, such as running and kicking, on the same day they are born.

Reproduction is limited by the amount of habitat available. Bison tend to disperse when food supplies are no longer able to sustain a population within the current range, which causes a decrease in population density, indirectly lowering the rate at which mating occurs. Older bulls typically have smaller ranges than female herds, because they live either alone or in smaller herds, so exert less pressure on the local forage. Loss of functional habitat is a major ecological concern for this species due to the density-dependent nature of reproduction.

Wood bison are herbivorous grazers that feed primarily on grasses, sedges, and forbs. Due to frequent and heavy snowfall in their native habitat, food availability fluctuates throughout the year, leading to a diverse and varied diet. Deep snow often creates a barrier between the bison and their food source, so they must use their large heads and neck muscles to dig for edible morsels. After the temperature rises and the snow melts, wood bison also feed on silverberry and willow leaves in the summer.

== Adaptations ==
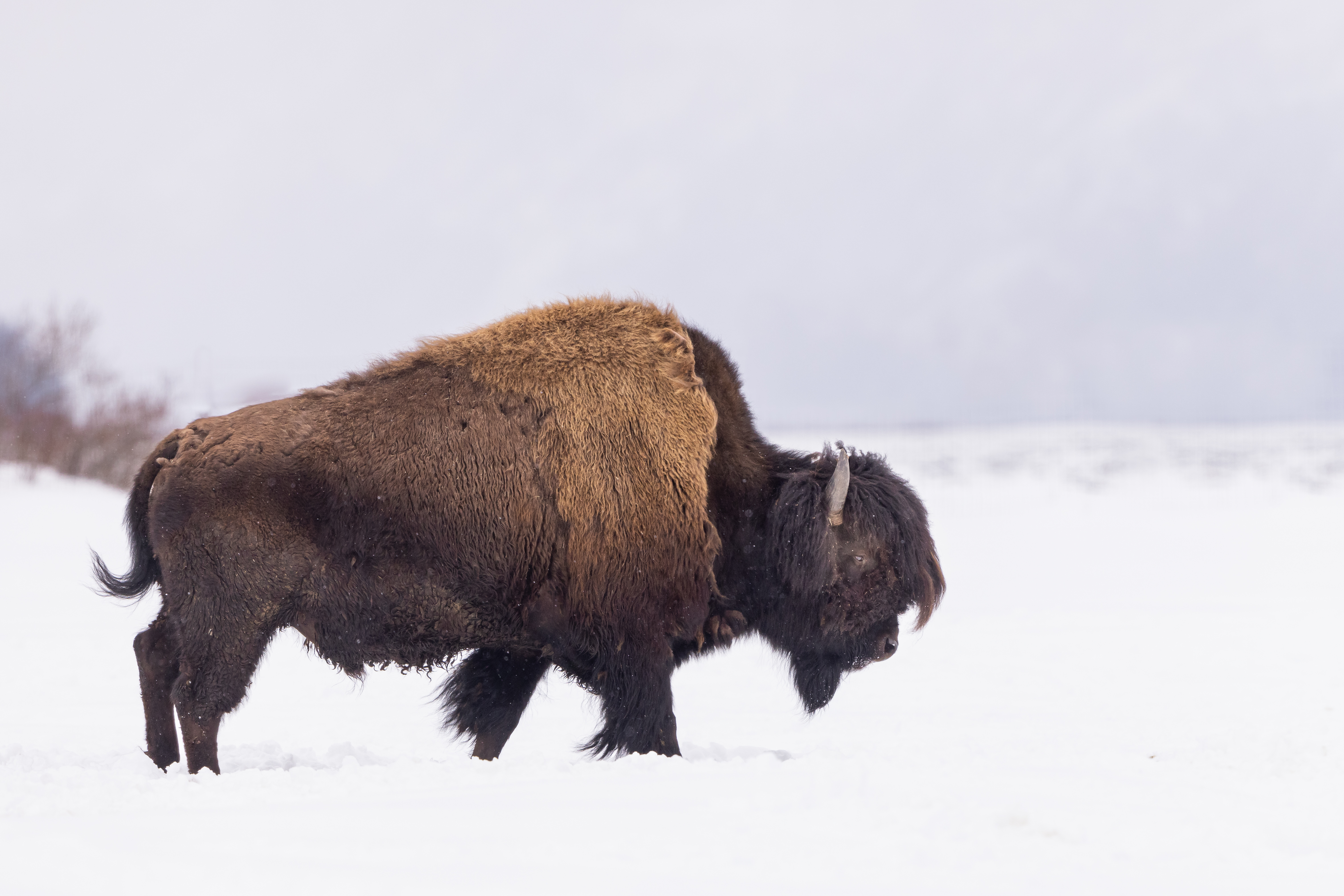
A bull standing in snow at Alaska Wildlife Conservation Center

Researchers believe wood bison are beneficiaries of a natural law known as Bergmann's rule due to their sheer size. Their increased body mass over their southern relative, the plains bison, produces more heat and provides a larger frame on which to store fat for the winter. This, along with several other adaptations, helps the animal survive in the harsh climate of northern Canada and Alaska. The wooly hair that covers the body is such an effective insulator on which falling snow collects rather than melting, further insulating the animal from the cold. When food becomes more scarce in the winter, wood bison are also capable of slowing down their metabolic rate. The primary benefit is slower digestion rates, which means the animals are able to pull more nutrients out of each meal. This results in fewer necessary feedings to maintain energy demands. In addition to greater nutrient absorption, the slower digestion rate means more heat is produced as a byproduct of metabolizing the food, further contributing to maintaining body temperature.

Although wood bison are native to Canada and Alaska, they have also been introduced to Yakutia, Russia as part of an ongoing species restoration project. Yakutia provides similar climatic conditions as in Canada, albeit with colder average temperatures. The Northwest Territories in Canada can drop as low as −60 °C during the winters, while areas in Yakutia, such as Oymyakon have been reported to drop as low as −71.2 °C. Despite the frigid temperatures, the bison herd is adapting well to the new environment.

== Threats ==
As with other bison, the wood bison's population was devastated by hunting, loss of habitat, and other factors. By the early 20th century, they were regarded as extremely rare.

=== Hybridization ===
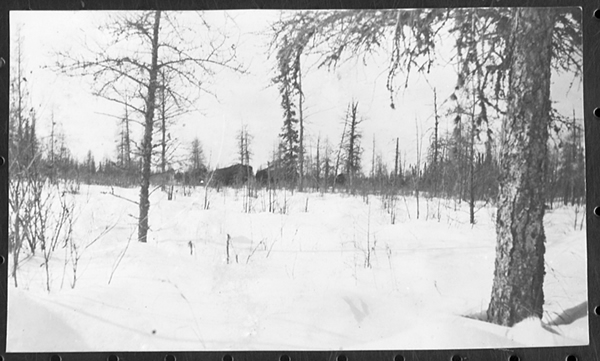
Possible pure wood bison prior to the mass hybridization, photographed in Northwest Territories in 1920s (Norman Lubbock Robinson)

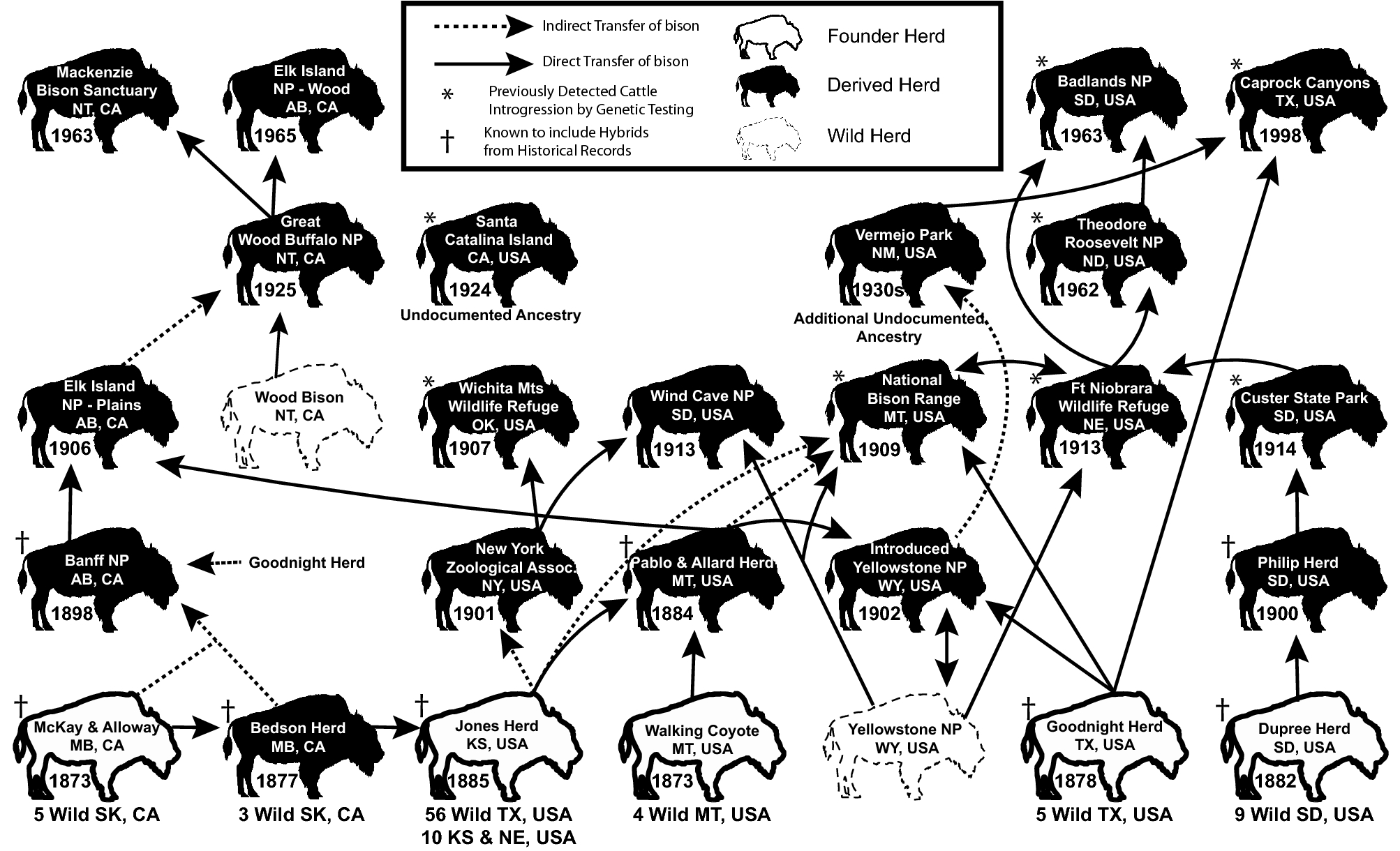
A diagram illustrating interconnections of remaining wood and plains bison populations in North America

Wood bison populations have been susceptible to hybridization with sometimes diseased plains bison, thereby polluting the genetic stock, the phenotype, and health condition. Between 1925 and 1928, 6,673 plains bison compared to 1,500–2,000 wood bison, were translocated from Buffalo National Park into the Wood Buffalo National Park by the government of Canada, to avoid mass culling because of overpopulation, despite protests from conservation biologists. The translocation was regarded as a tragedy because all the remaining wood bison were thought to be hybridized with the larger numbers of plains bison. In 1957, though, a relatively pure herd of about 200 was discovered in an isolated part of Wood Buffalo National Park, although gene flows likely occurred elsewhere within the park when the herd was discovered, and this herd unlikely remained completely isolated and did not preserve pure genes and phenotype.

Thus, the wood bison in the Wood Buffalo National Park are considered hybrid descendants. A study in 1995 detected notable differences, though, between each herd within the park, showing different degrees of hybridization. The herd at the Sweetgrass Station near the Peace–Athabasca Delta, as well as the Slave River Lowlands herd, preserved phenotypes relatively loyal to the original wood bison before the 1920s, being measured from degrees of morphological overlaps between pure plains bison, even surpassing the preserved herds at Elk Island National Park and Mackenzie Bison Sanctuary.

Natural hybridization between wood and plains bison presumably occurred for a limited extent in the regions where the two ecotypes (or subspecies) overlapped. Wood–plains hybrids are generally called "Parkland bison".

Disease-free and genetically unique populations of wood bison have been discovered in recent years. If these populations, such as the herds from the Ronald Lake and the Firebag River regions, had little or no contacts with hybridized animals from Wood Buffalo National Park, a possibility exists of pure wood bison surviving.

=== Disease ===
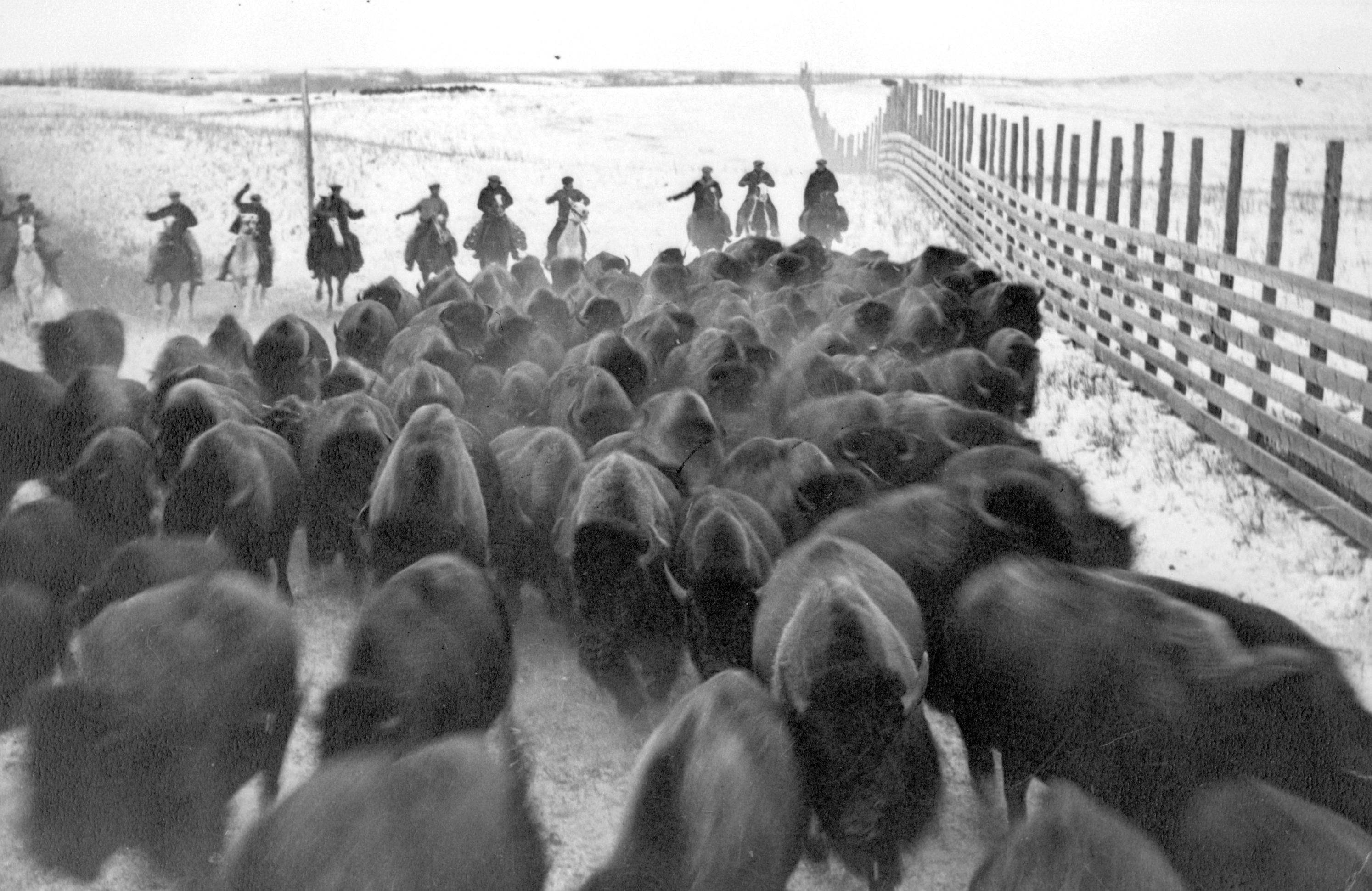
Translocation of diseased plains bison from Buffalo National Park into Wood Buffalo National Park in 1920s resulted in the collapse of wood bison.

Publicly owned, free-ranging herds in Alberta, British Columbia, Yukon, and the Northwest Territories comprise 90% of existing wood bison, although six smaller public and private captive-breeding herds with conservation objectives comprise roughly 10% of the total, or around 900 head. These captive herds and two large isolated, free-ranging herds all derive from disease-free and morphologically representative founding stock from Wood Buffalo National Park. These captive herds are particularly important for conservation and recovery purposes, because the larger free-ranging herds in and around Wood Buffalo National Park were infected with bovine brucellosis and tuberculosis after the plains bison had been translocated from Buffalo National Park.

Diseases including brucellosis and tuberculosis remain endemic in the free-ranging herds in and around Wood Buffalo National Park. The diseases represent a serious management issue for governments, various local indigenous groups, and the cattle industry rapidly encroaching on the park's boundaries. Disease management strategies and initiatives began in the 1950s and have yet to result in a reduction of the incidence of either disease, despite considerable expenditure and increased public involvement.

== Conservation ==
Historical range of wood bison.

The herd currently has a total population around 2,500, largely as a result of conservation efforts by Canadian government agencies. In 1988, the Committee on the Status of Endangered Wildlife in Canada changed the subspecies' conservation status from "endangered" to "threatened", where it remains.

On June 17, 2008, 53 wood bison were transferred from Alberta's Elk Island National Park to the Alaska Wildlife Conservation Center in Anchorage, Alaska. There, they were to be held in quarantine for two years and then reintroduced to their native habitat in the Minto Flats area near Fairbanks, but this plan was placed on hold. In May 2014, the U.S. Fish and Wildlife Service published a final rule allowing the reintroduction of a "nonessential experimental" population of wood bison into three areas of Alaska. As a result, the Alaska Department of Fish and Game introduced the first herd of 100 animals to the Innoko River area in western Alaska in spring 2015, and 58 animals to the Minto Flats State Game Refuge west of Fairbanks in July 2025. The Alaska Department of Fish and Game plans to introduce a third herd to Yukon Flats State Game Refuge in 2027.

Currently, about 7,000 wood bison remain in wildernesses within the Northwest Territories, the Yukon, British Columbia, Alberta, and Manitoba.

=== Ronald Lake Herd ===
Recently, several bison herds that are disease-free and genetically unique compared to the populations within Wood Buffalo National Park (WBNP), have been detected. These herds were once considered as merely split groups from WBNP bison, but members of First Nations and Métis community members claimed that they knew for generations that one of the herds, the Ronald Lake herd, is a separated population. This, and genetic uniqueness and disease-free conditions of this and other herds, such as the one from Firebag River, indicate that these herds either remained isolated or had limited contacts with animals from WBNP despite being located adjacent to the boundary of WBNP, potentially representing the original (pure) lineages. The Ronald Lake herd became of particular interest among researchers and conservationists due to its genetic uniqueness and the extremely small sizes of other herds, and the herd became protected under a unique designation. To strengthen the protections, a new sanctuary Kitaskino Nuwenëné Wildland Provincial Park was established in 2019 by a historic collaboration of the government and indigenous communities including first nations.

Along with the Ronald Lake herd, the much smaller Wabasca herd has also become a subject of special protection.

=== Introduction into Asia ===
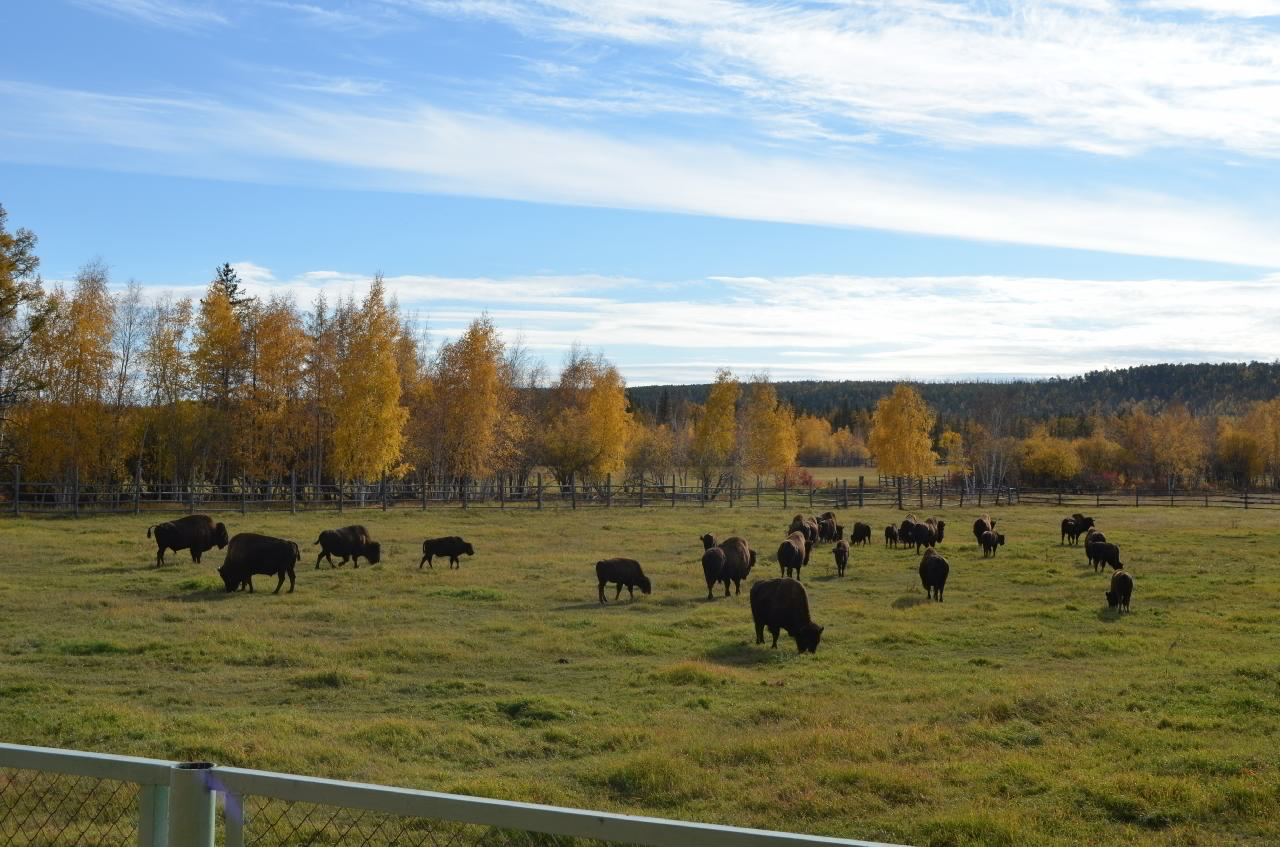
Wood bison at a breeding facility in Sakha Republic.

The reintroductions of muskoxen and the introduction of wood bison into Yakutia, Russia, were first proposed by zoologists P. B. Yurgenson in 1961 and O. V. Egorov in 1963. Compared to the first reintroduction of muskoxen in 1996, an outherd of wood bison was established as part of an international conservation project in 2006, where the related steppe bison (B. priscus) died out over 6,000 years ago. Additional bison were sent from Elk Island National Park in 2011, 2013, and 2020 to Russia, bringing the total to over 120. A team of Russian and Korean scientists proposed a potential de-extinction of the steppe bison with wood bison in Siberia using cloning techniques.

As of 2019, the number of bison increased to more than 210 animals, and a portion of the herd was released into the wild. To strengthen the restoration further, the Yakutia's Red List officially registered wood bison. In 2020, 10 juveniles were translocated into a remote area to form the second herd. Pleistocene Park in Yakutia originally wanted to bring wood bison into its enclosures, but failed to do so and brought in plains bison instead.

== Gallery ==
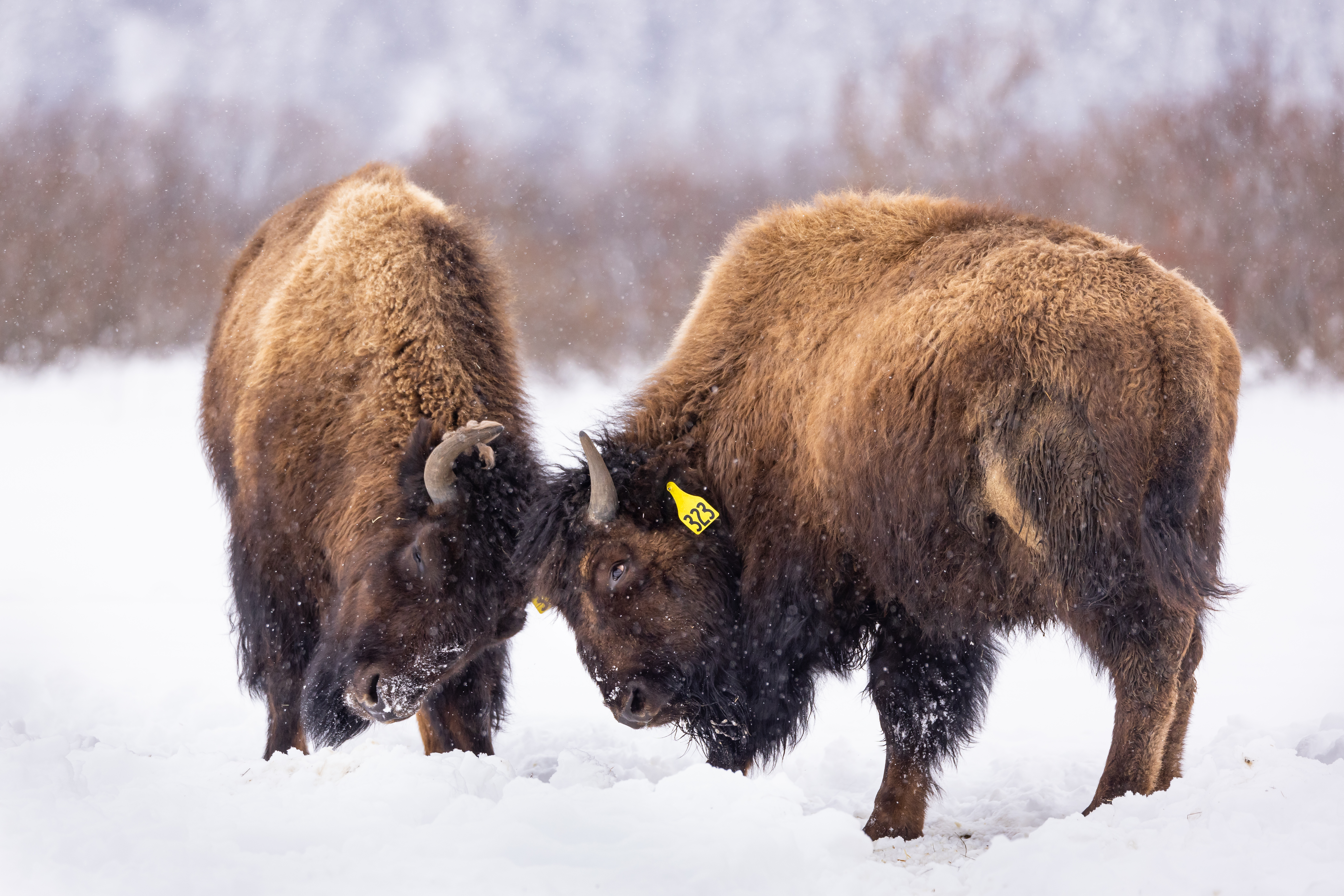
Young bulls sparring at Alaska Wildlife Conservation Center

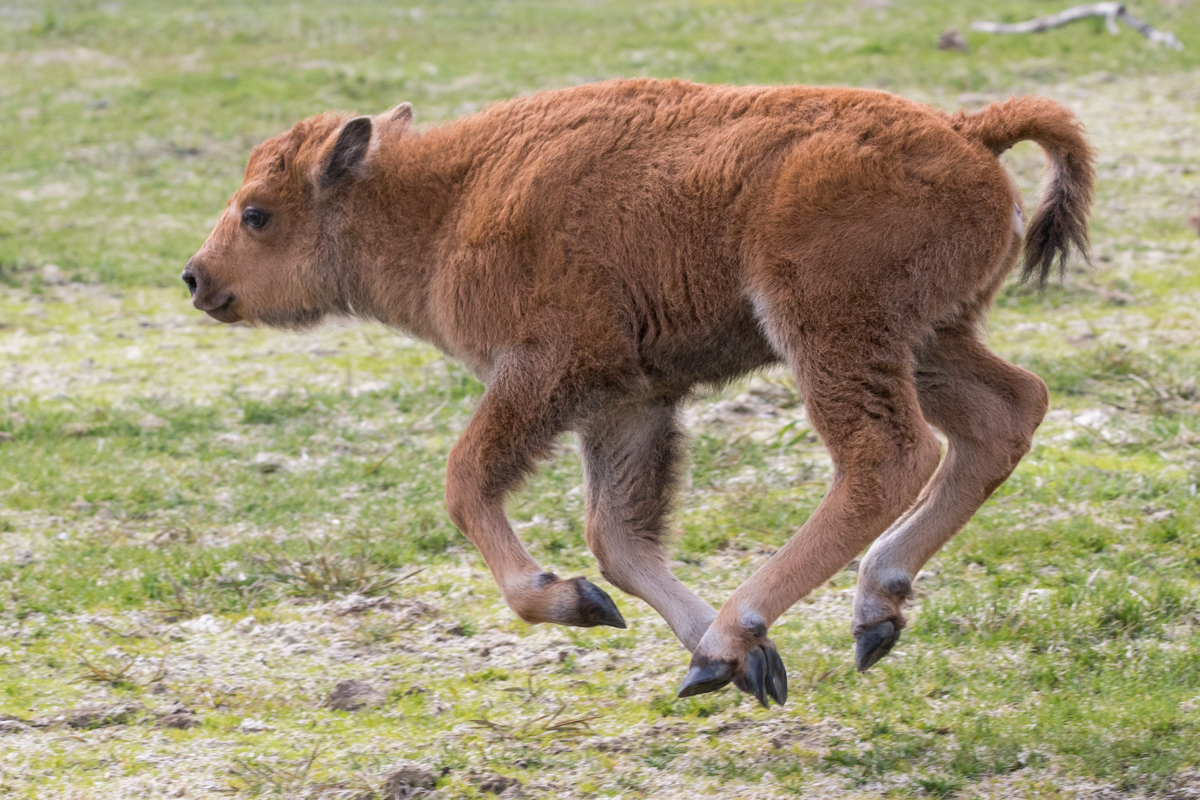
A calf galloping

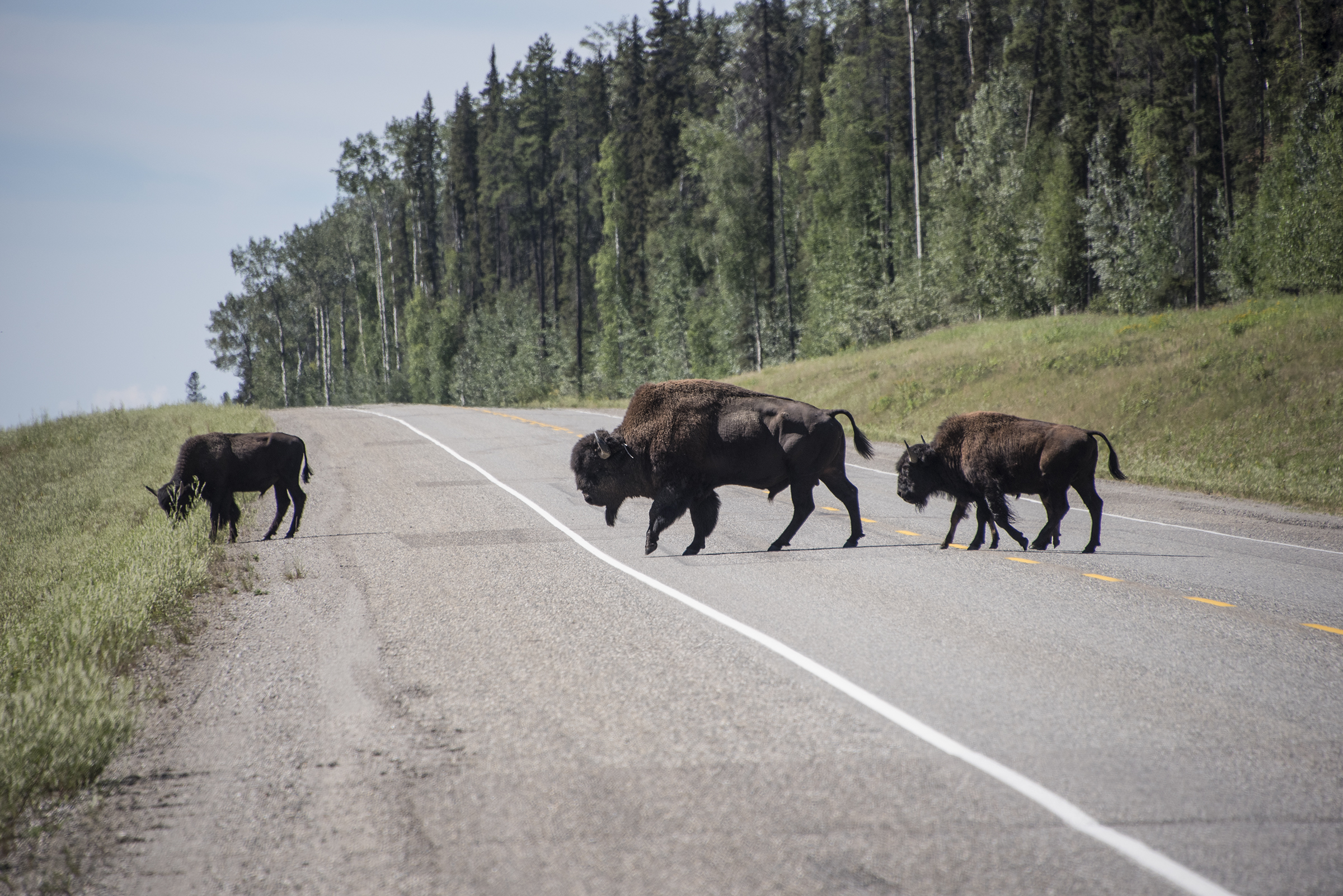
A herd crossing Alaska Highway

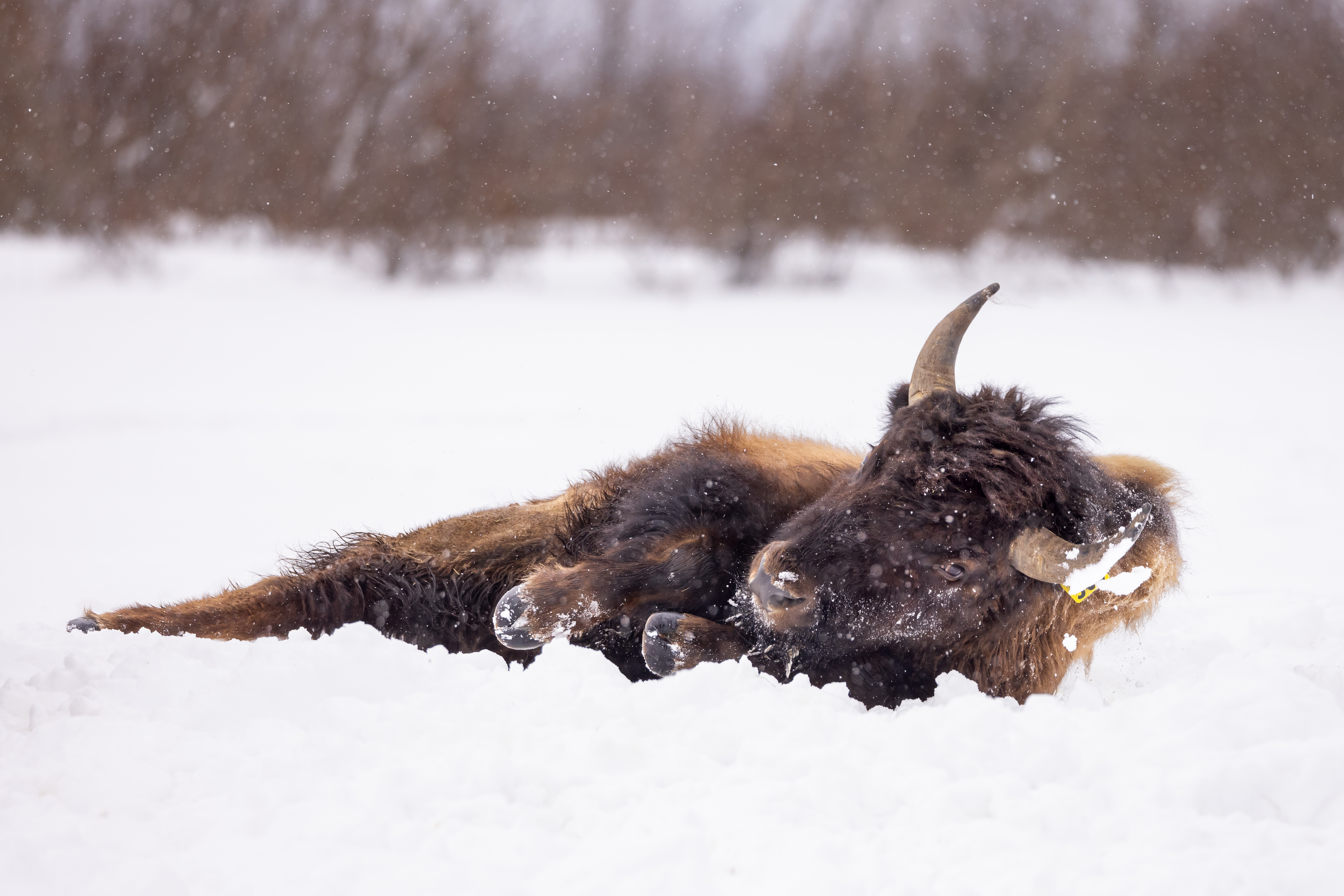
Wallowing in snow

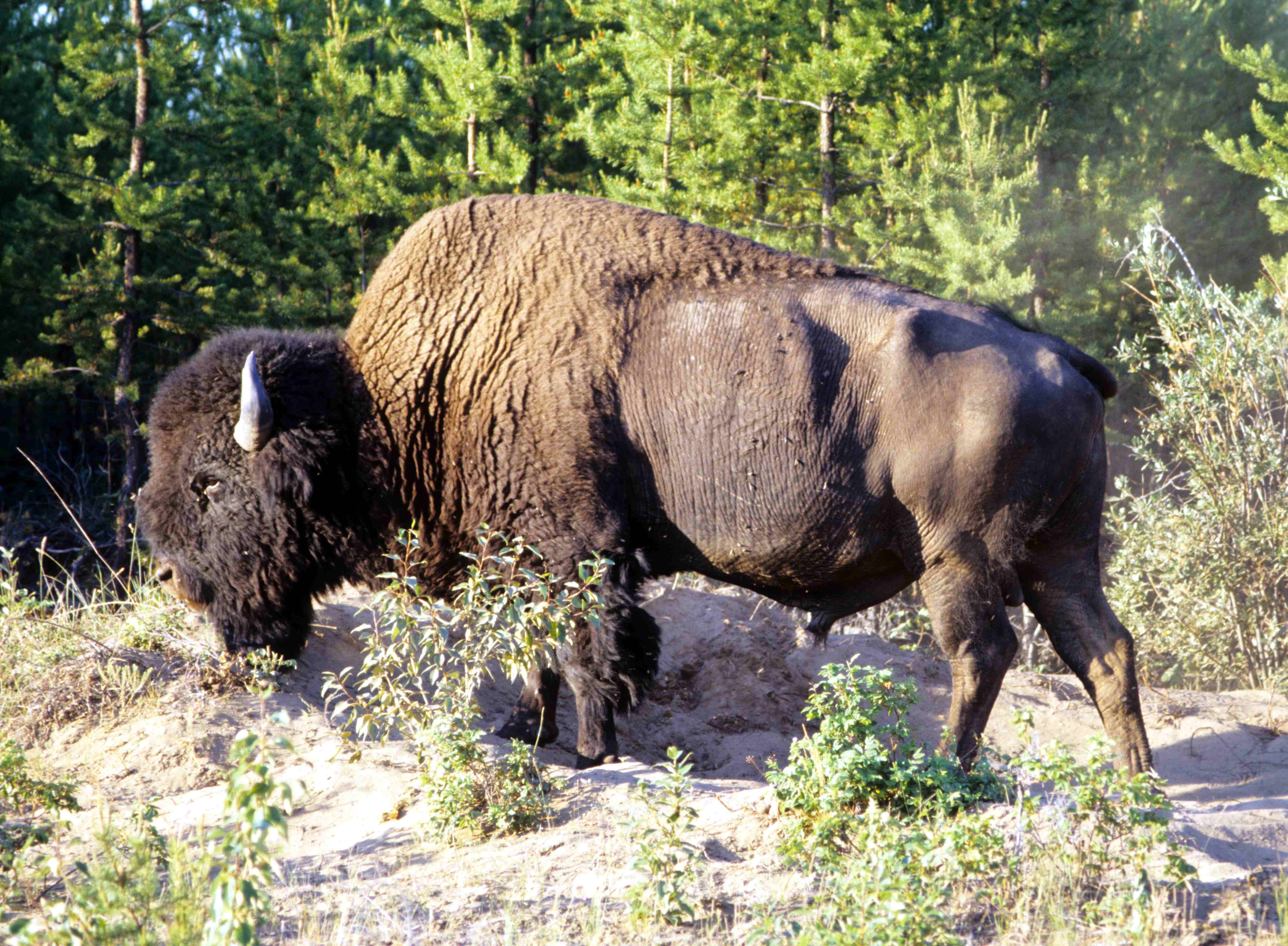
Wood bison (not pure) in Wood Buffalo National Park

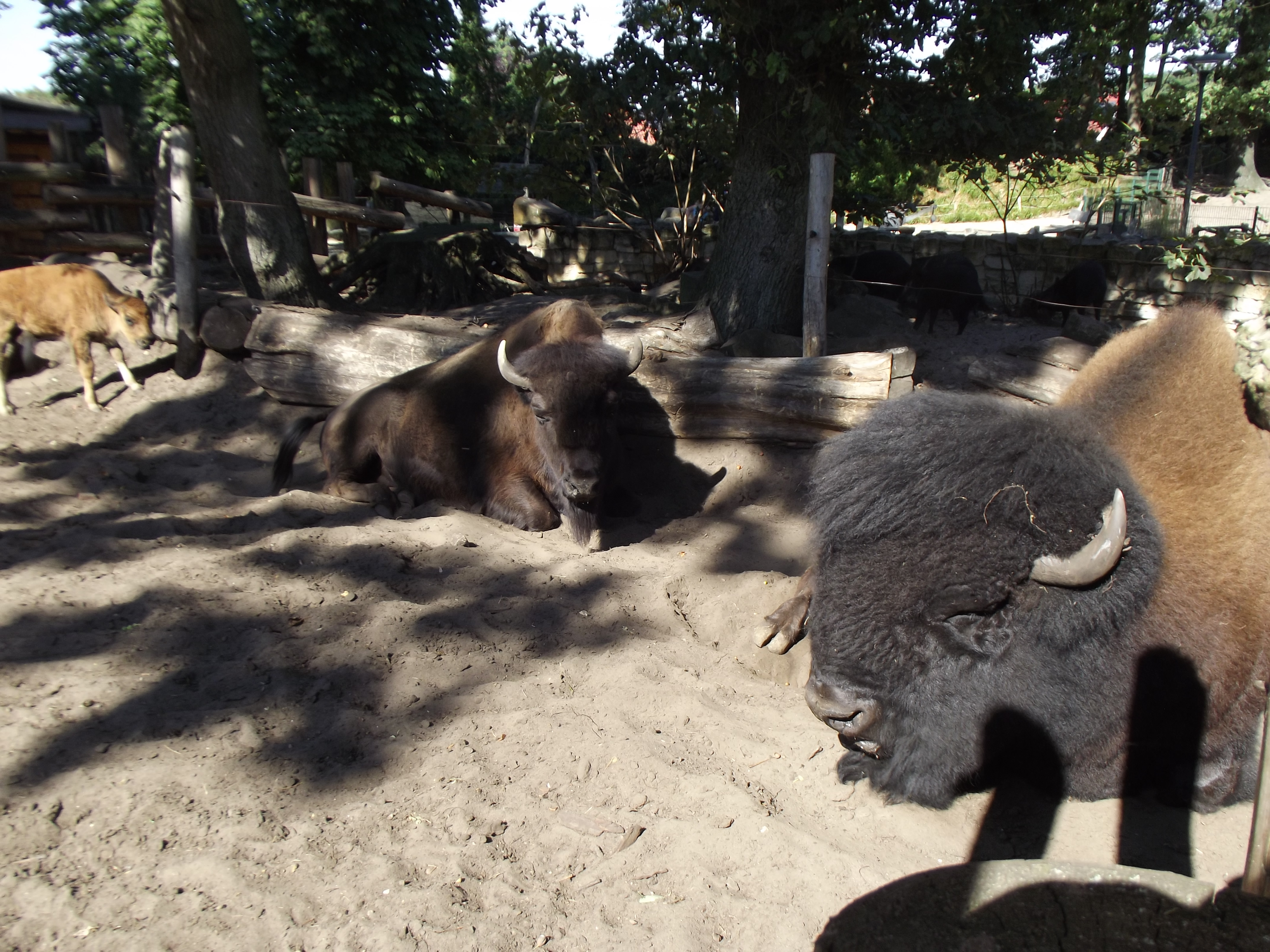
Captive animals in Nordhorn

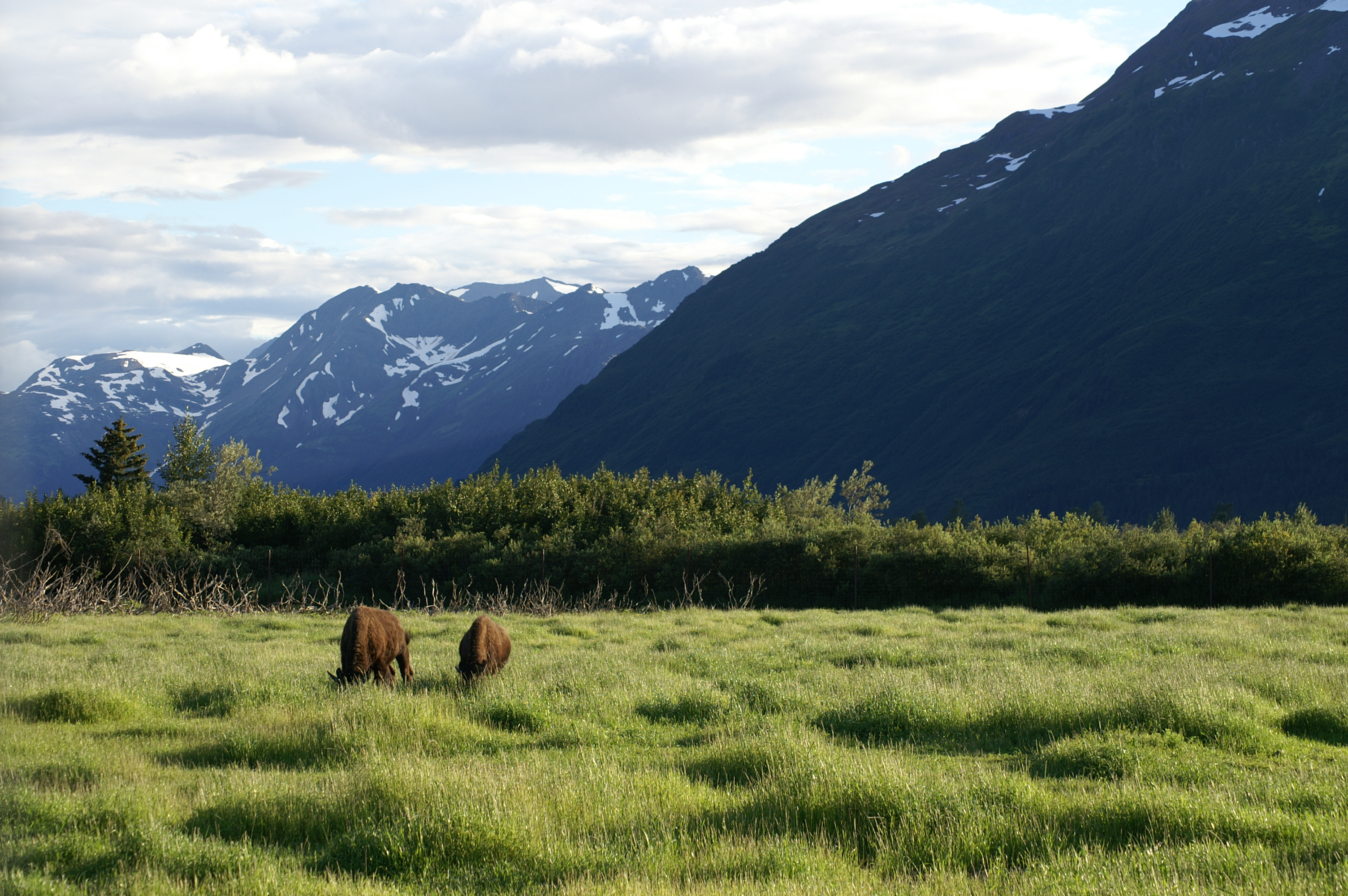
Grazing near Kenai Peninsula

== See also ==
- Bison hunting
- American Bison Society
- History of bison conservation in Canada
