= Alaska Wildlife Conservation Center =

Zoo in Portage, Alaska, United States

- Alaska Wildlife Conservation Center logo

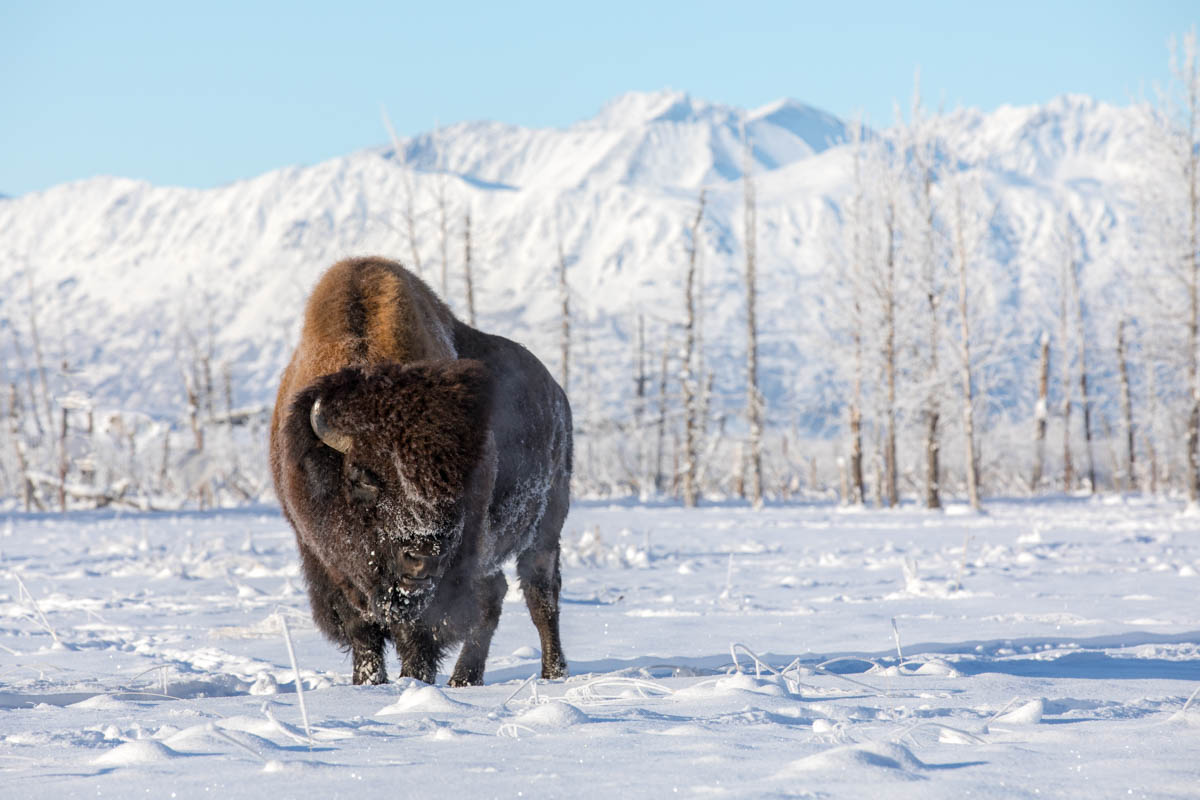
- Wood bison at the conservation center
- Interactive map of Alaska Wildlife Conservation Center
- Date opened: 1993
- Location: Portage, Alaska
- Land area: About 200 acres (81 ha)
- Website: alaskawildlife.org

The Alaska Wildlife Conservation Center is a non-profit organization dedicated to conservation, research, education, and animal care. The center is located on about 200 acres (81 ha) at the head of Turnagain Arm and the entrance to Portage Valley, Milepost 79 of the Seward Highway, about 11 mi southeast of Girdwood. The center is in the Municipality of Anchorage on the approximant border of the Kenai Peninsula and the Kenai Mountains to the south and the Chugach Mountains to the north.

It is a wildlife sanctuary for orphaned or injured wildlife, as well as home or temporary home to captive born and translocated wildlife such as wood bison. It is a wildlife sanctuary that provides comfortable, permanent homes for orphaned and injured animals.

== History ==
The Alaska Wildlife Conservation Center opened in 1993 as the for-profit Big Game Alaska.

In 1999, the center became a 501(c)3 non-profit organization, with Mike Miller serving as the center's executive director. The name was officially changed to Alaska Wildlife Conservation Center, Inc. in 2007. In 2018, Miller departed the center as executive director, with Dianna Whitney being promoted to that position. In 2019, the center acquired the land and remaining assets from Miller. Today, Alaska Wildlife Conservation Center, (AWCC), is a nonprofit wildlife sanctuary dedicated to preserving Alaska's wildlife through conservation, education, research, and animal care.

== Animals ==
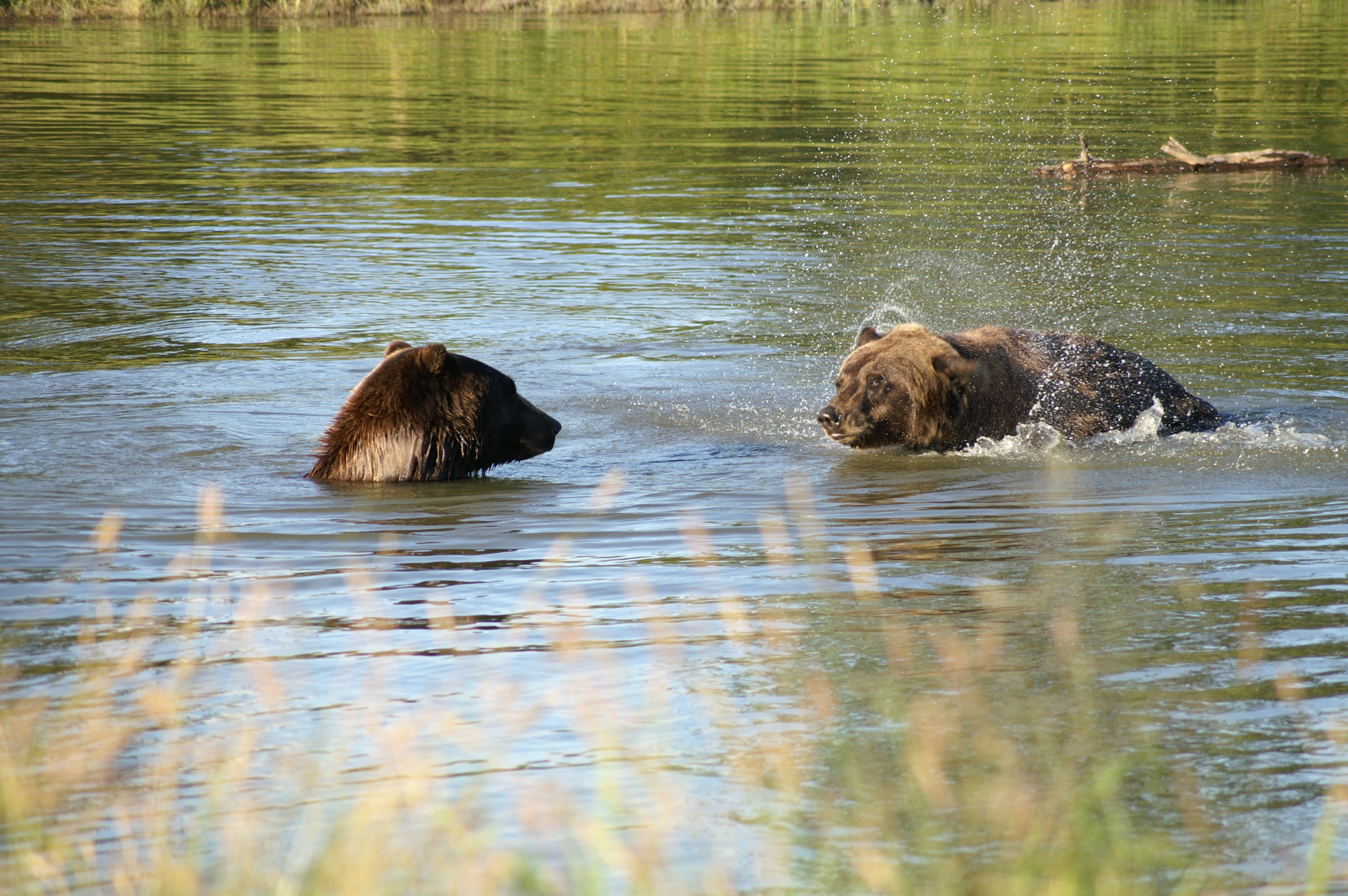
Two adult Alaskan Brown bears at the Conservation Center

Animals at the center include timber wolves, grizzly bears, black bears, Alaskan moose, red foxes, elk, muskoxen, sitka black tailed deer, porcupine caribou, Canadian lynx, bald eagles, great horned owls, wood bison, porcupines, and coyotes.

Most of the animals are cared for in large natural habitats. For instance, three brown bears live in an 21-acre (8.5 ha) habitat of brushland and conifers, and two black bears are housed in a 14-acre (5.7 ha) enclosure with a stream.

One of the most famous inhabitants at AWCC is Hugo, the grizzly bear. She was found orphaned and starving by hunters near Kotzebue. Hugo had about 150 porcupine quills stuck in her paws making it impossible for her to find food.

== Education ==
The Alaska Wildlife Conservation Center (AWCC) hosts education and outreach programs--- connecting visitors and students with Alaska’s wildlife and conservation challenges. Each year, the center reaches thousands of students through its field trips, workshops, and career presentations.

AWCC’s K–12 curriculum aligns with Alaska’s science standards, emphasising topics like habitat conservation, predator–prey relationships, and the coexistence of human and wildlife. Educators teach hands-on lessons, including animal tracking, habitat surveys, and data collection activities that teach observation and stewardship skills.

During the summer, AWCC hosts camps and internships that introduce youth to careers in biology and wildlife management. These programs include behind-the-scenes experiences with animal care staff and discussions on Alaska’s conservation laws.

== Research and Partnerships ==
The Alaska Wildlife Conservation Center works with other agencies within Alaska such as Alaska Department of Fish and Game (ADF&G), universities, and conservation nonprofits on research related to large-mammal ecology, animal rehabilitation, and the management of captive wildlife.

Some of the ongoing projects include long-term monitoring of Wood Bison health and behavioural studies on brown bears.

The AWCC also partners with Indigenous communities and ADF&G on stewardship education that combine traditional ecological knowledge with contemporary wildlife science.

== Conservation ==
Starting in 2003, the center has taken part in a program to reintroduce the wood bison back into Alaska after a 100-year absence. The wood bison is the largest land mammal in North America, and is a keystone grazing herbivore from the region. Conservationists transferred thirteen wood bison from various Canadian wildernesses to this wildlife conservation center in 2006. They sent fifty-three more Canadian wood bison from Alberta's Elk Island National Park for their survival two years later. This project was a joint effort with the Alaska Department of Fish & Game and other conservation groups.

== In popular culture ==
Several documentaries, features films, and other video media have been shot on location at the Alaska Wildlife Conservation Center including a documentary for National Geographic and Into Alaska featuring Jeff Corwin in 2007, and Into the Wild, starring Emile Hirsch. Other special guests to the center include Jungle Jack Hanna who filmed a few segments for his syndicated program. The center, its animals and staff have also been featured on many episodes of the NatGeo show Dr. Oakley, Yukon Vet.

In July 2010 the center's resident porcupine, "Snickers," gained worldwide publicity from video footage in which the friendly rodent appeared to behave like a puppy. The video went viral on the internet in a matter of days.

== Gallery ==
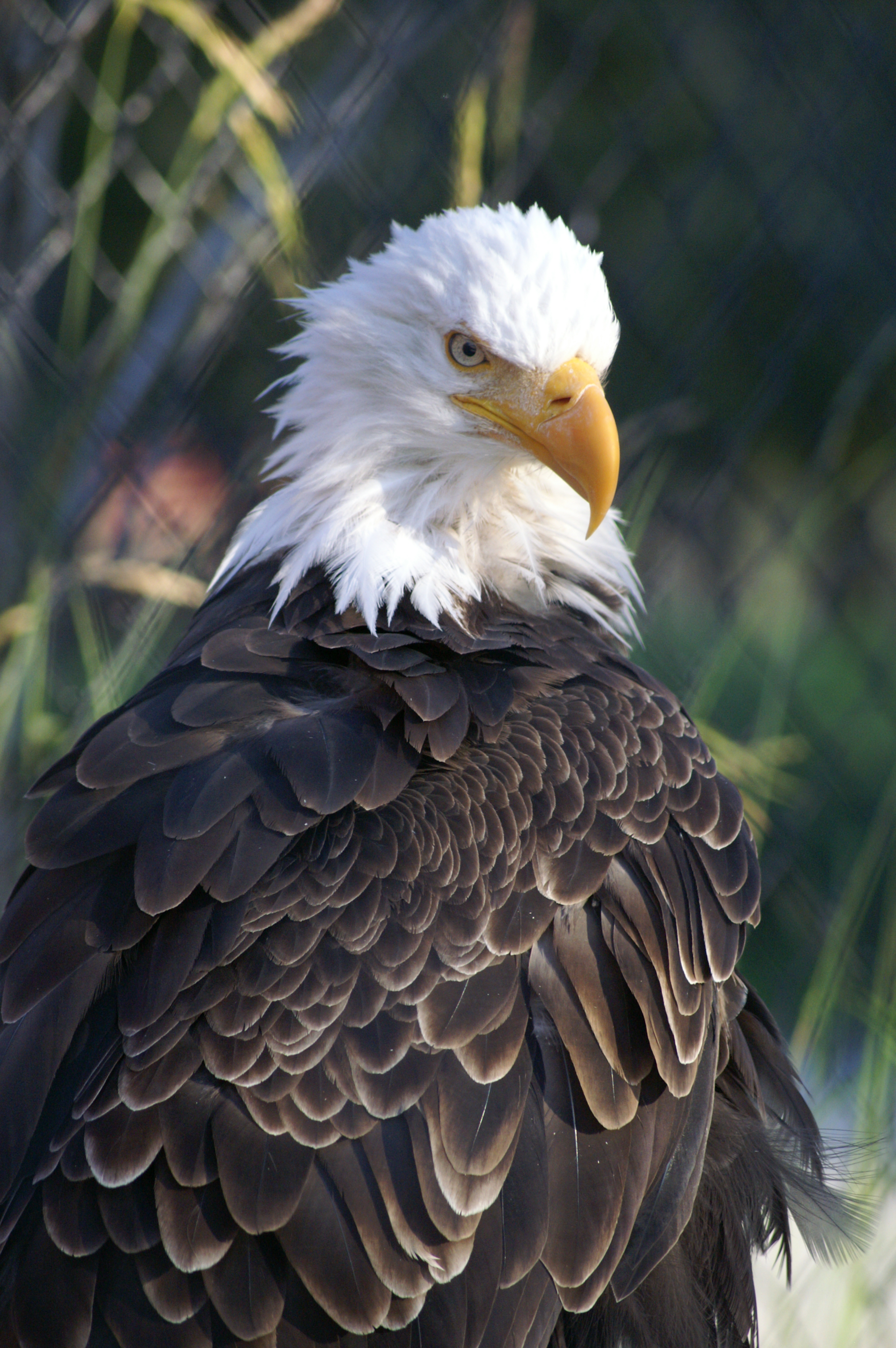
A rescued bald eagle at the conservation center

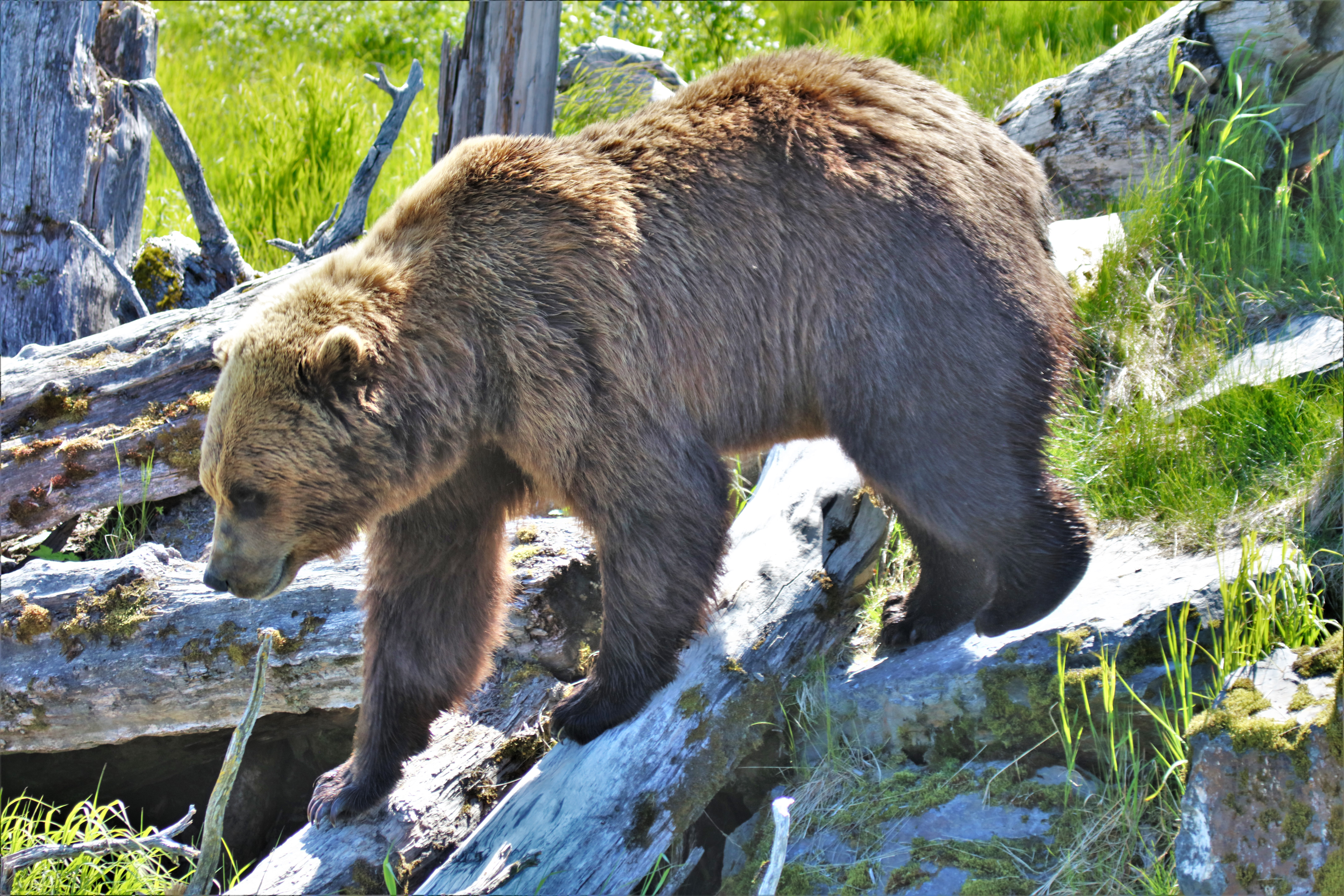
Bear at the center

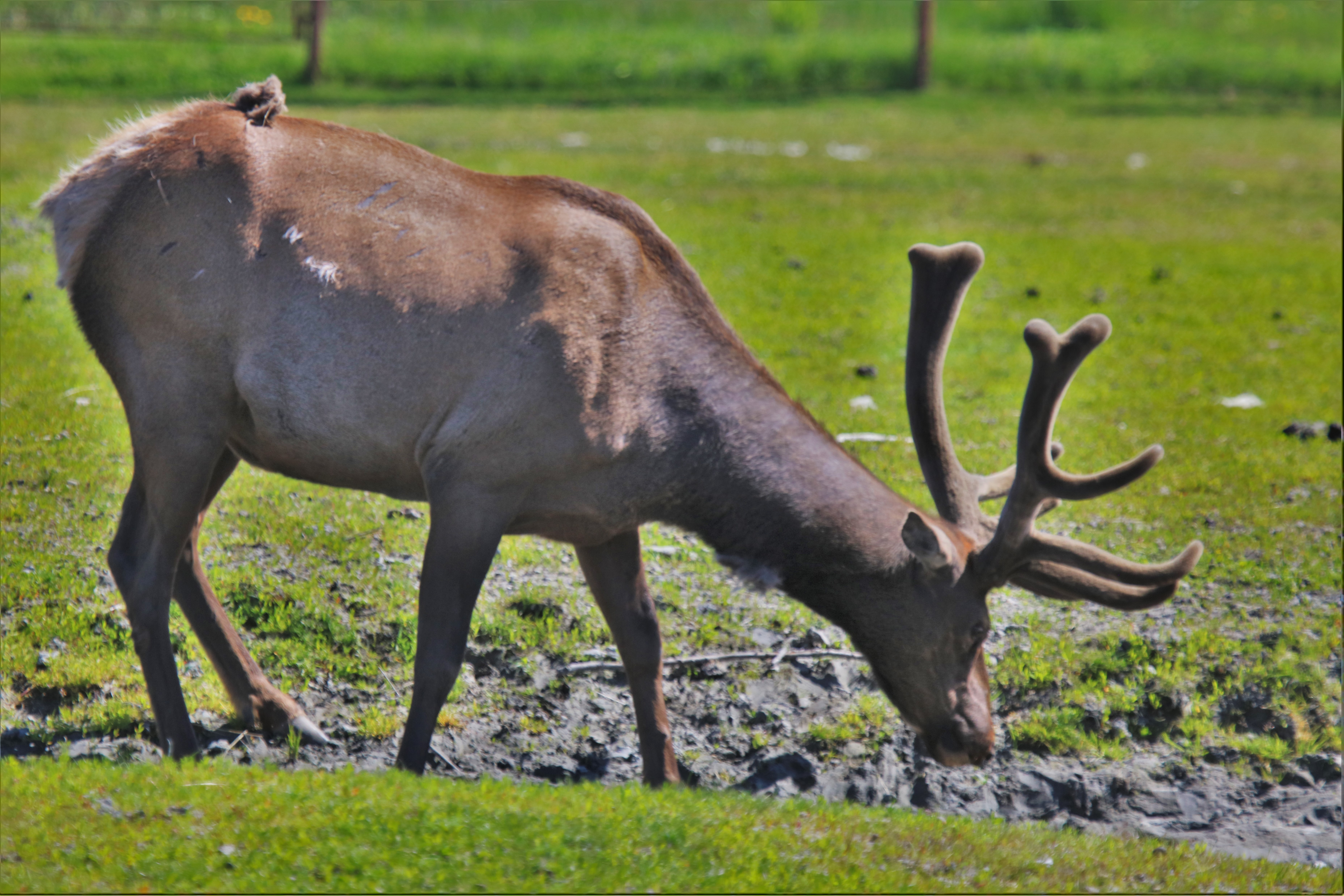
Elk (Cervus canadensis)

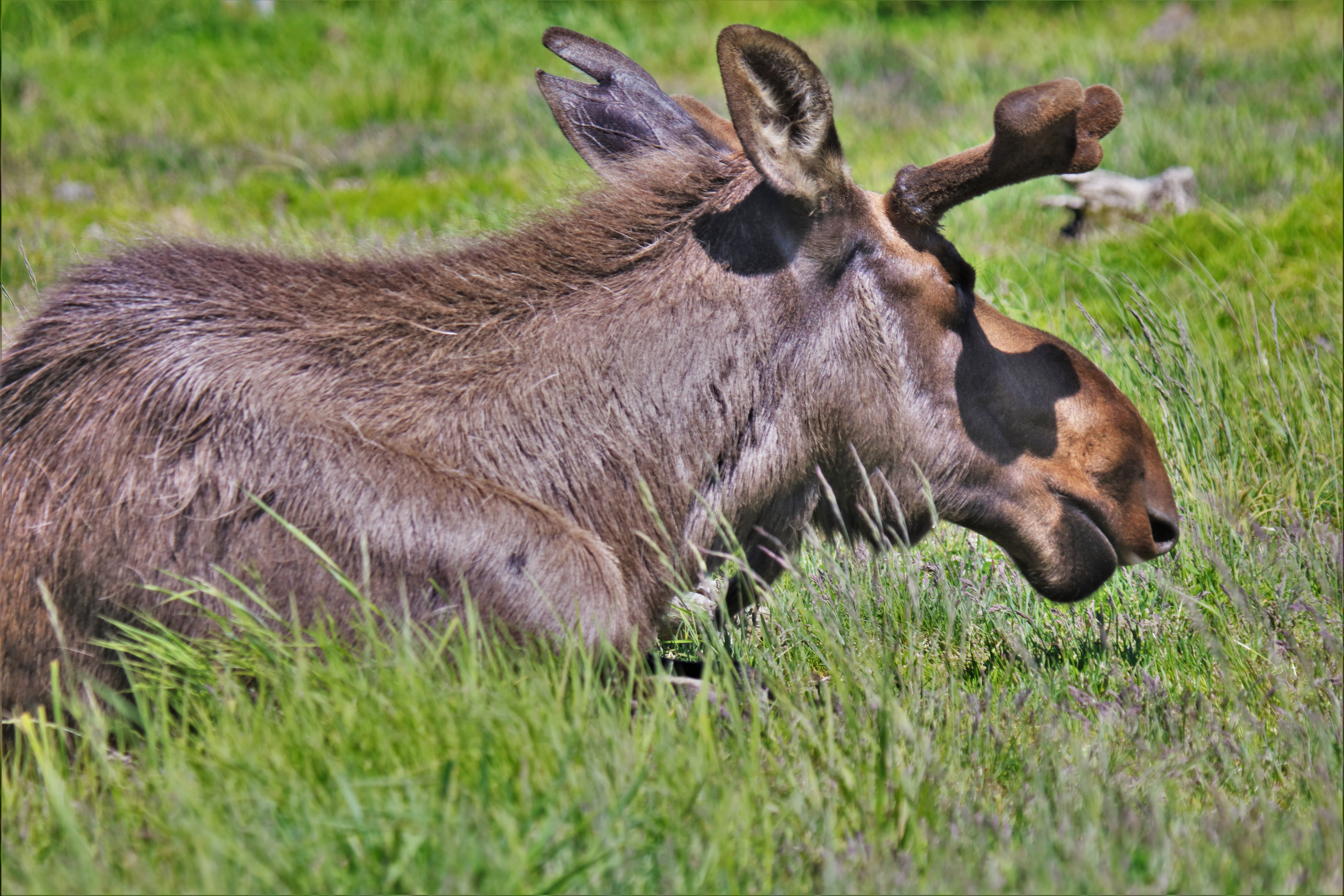
Alaska moose (Alces alces gigas)

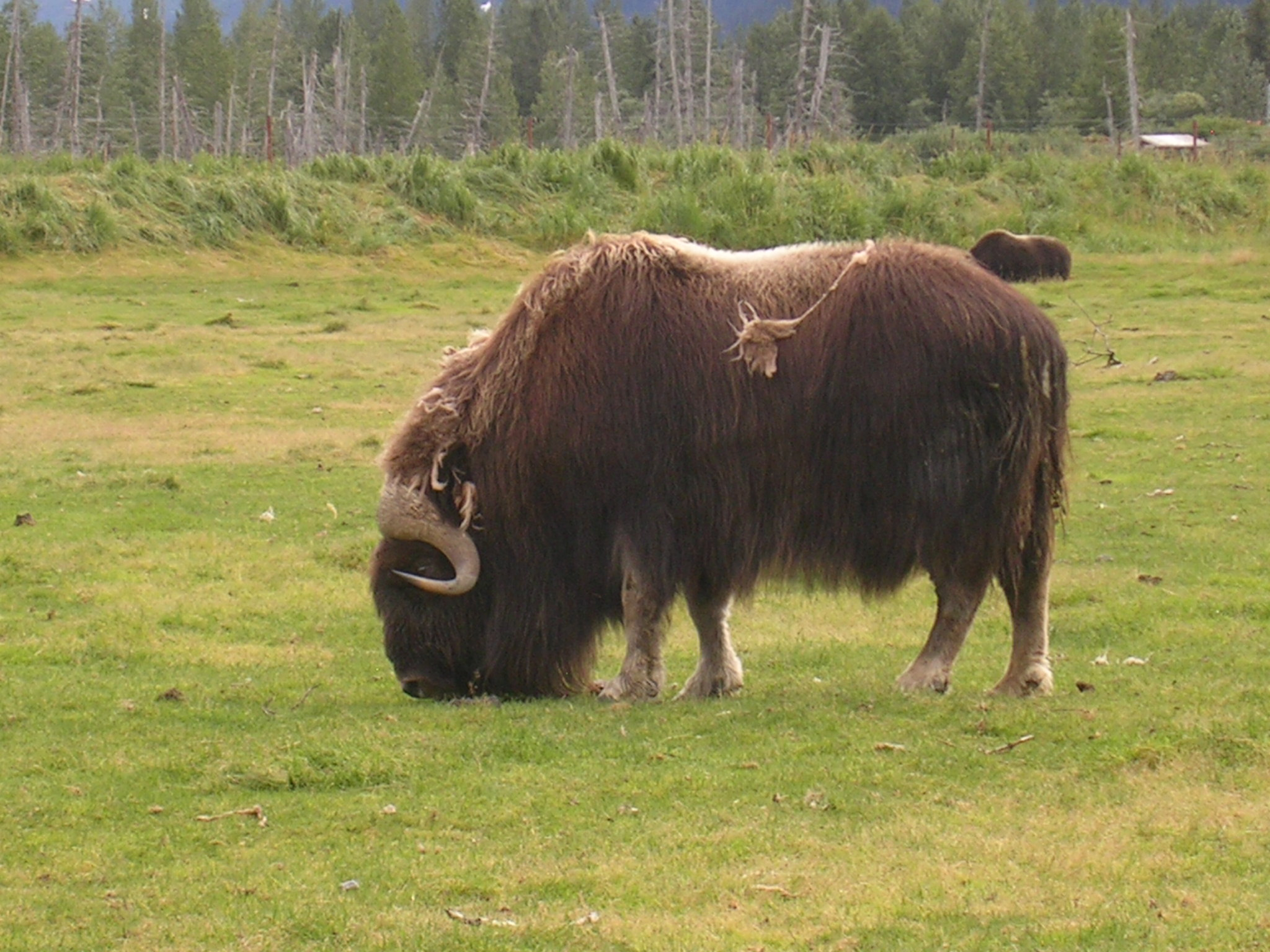
Muskox (Ovibos moschatus) grazing at the center

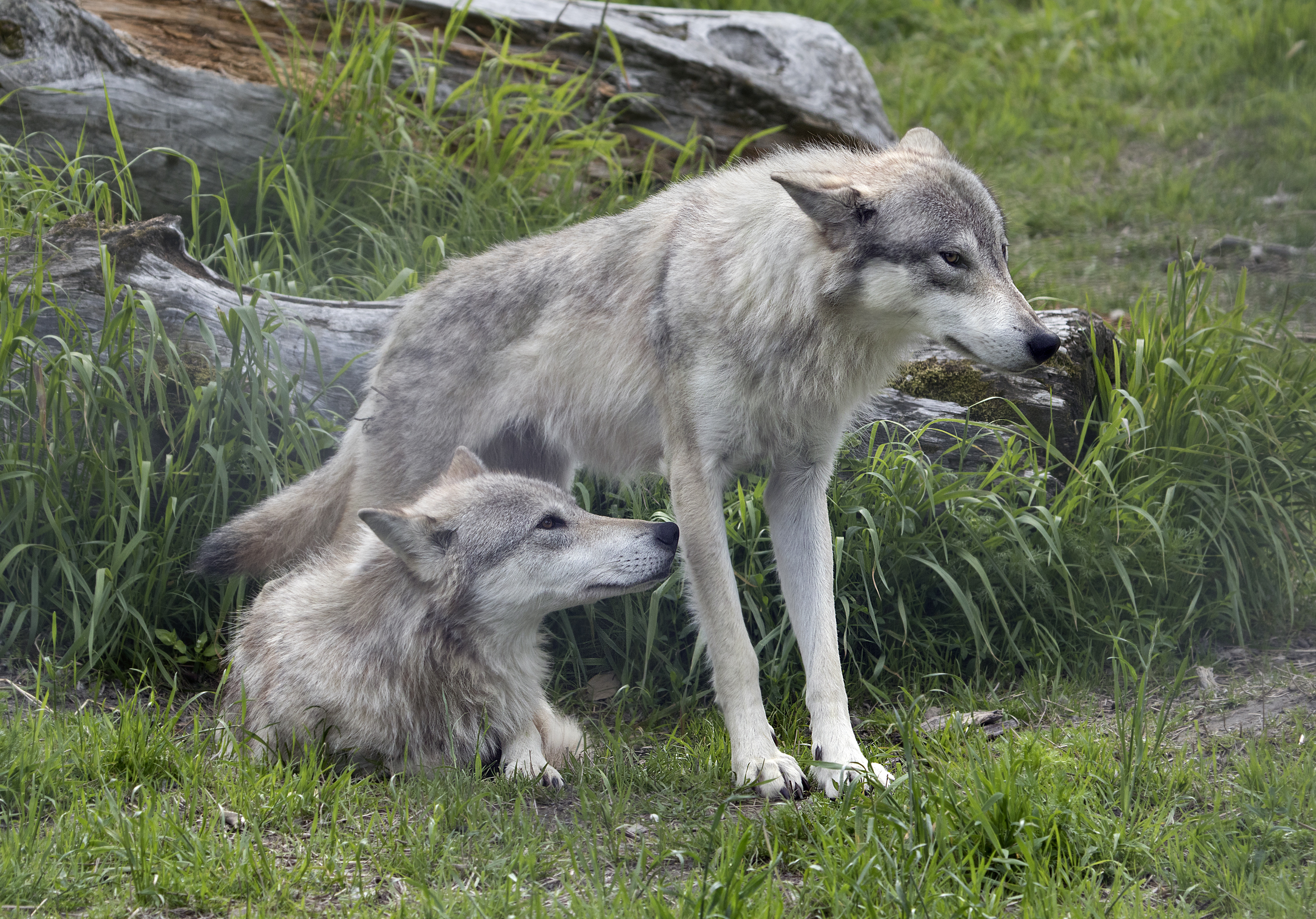
Wolves

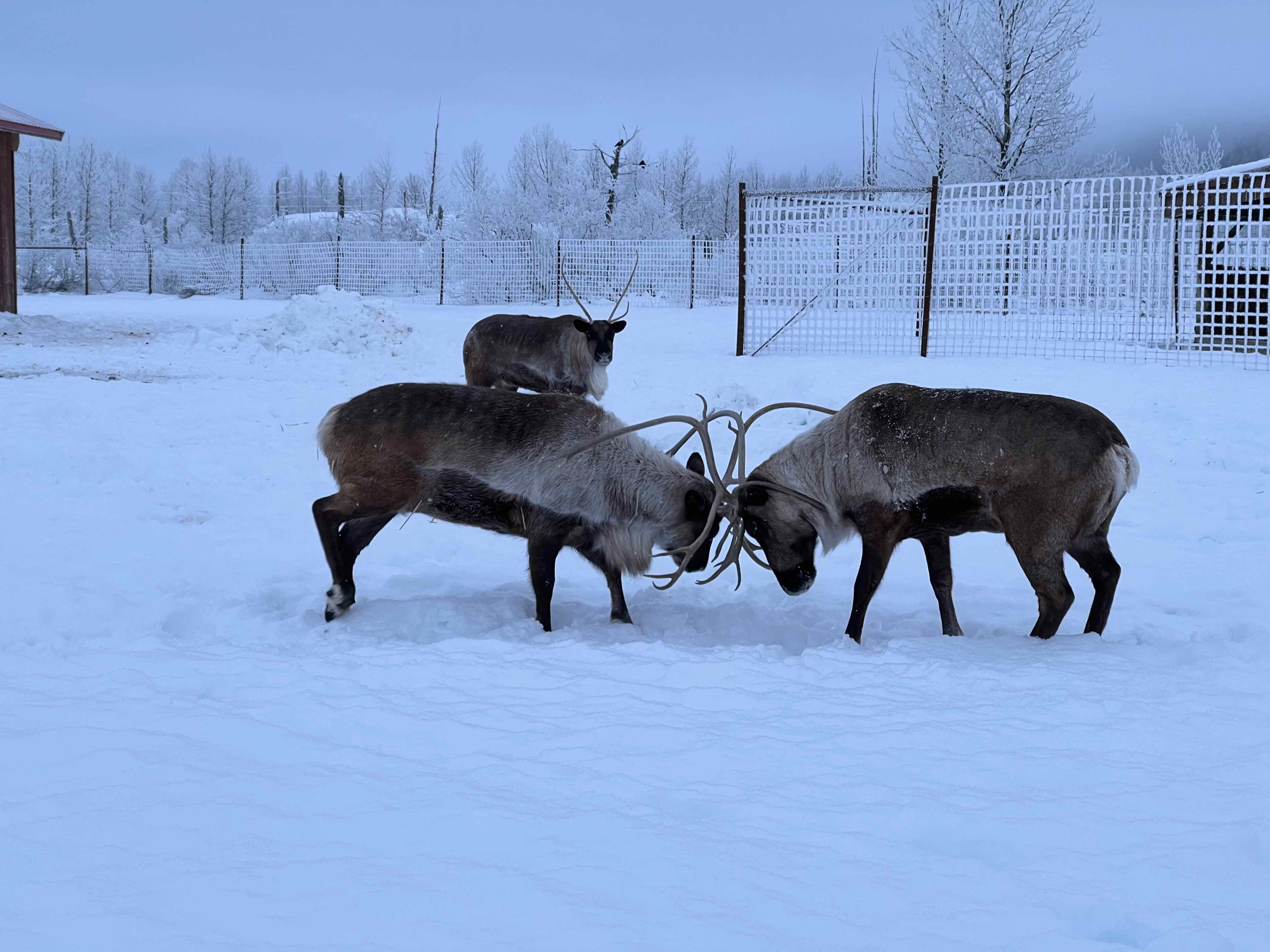
Two male caribou
