= Virginia Falls =

Virginia Falls may refer to:

- Virginia Falls (Montana), a waterfall in Glacier National Park (U.S.)
- Virginia Falls (Northwest Territories), a waterfall of the South Nahanni River (see Nahanni National Park Reserve)
