= Nahanni National Park Reserve =

National park in the Northwest Territories, Canada

- Réserve de parc national Nahanni
- IUCN category II (national park)
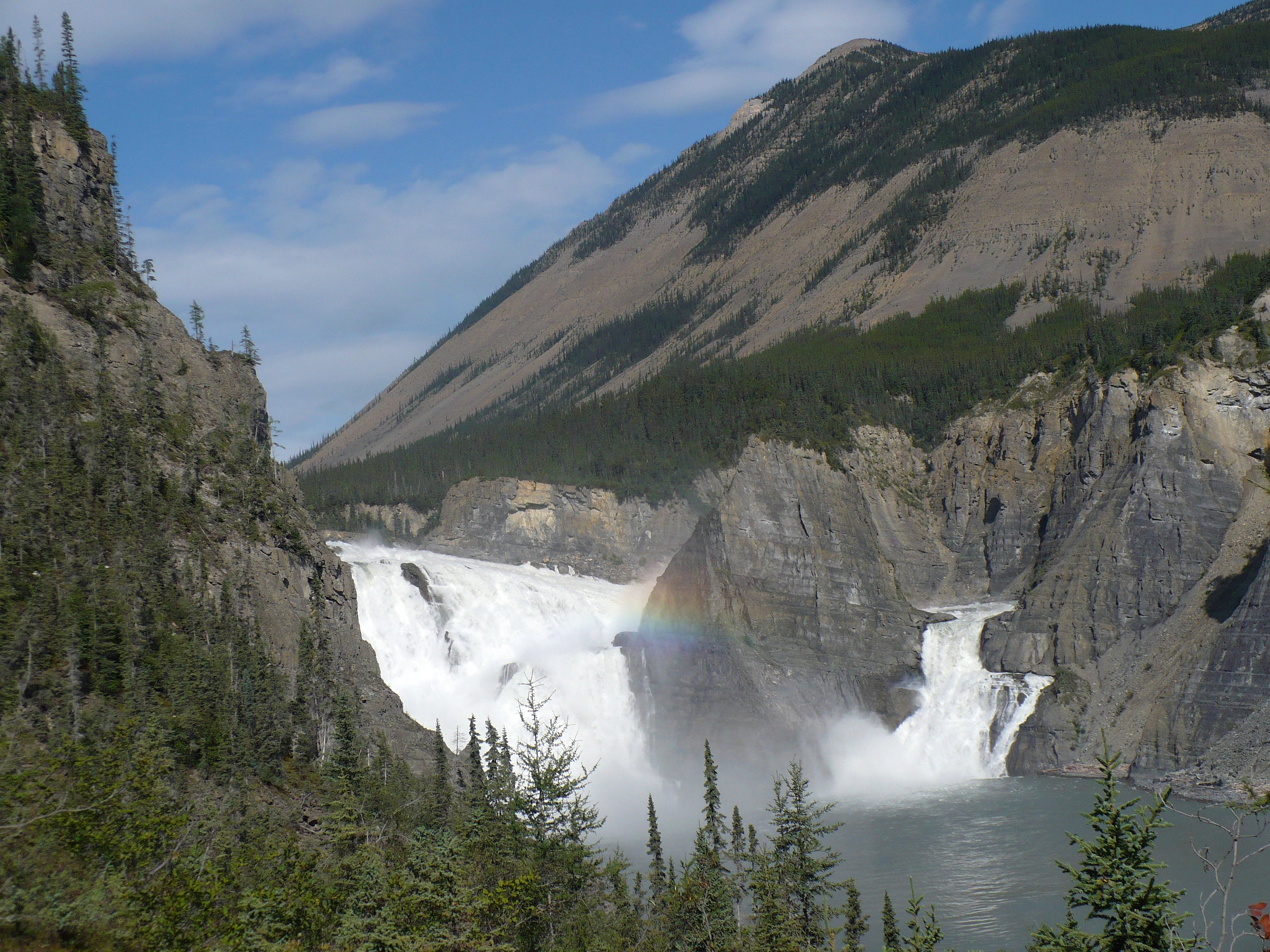
- Virginia Falls

- Location within Canada Location within Northwest Territories
- Interactive map of Nahanni National Park Reserve
- Location: Northwest Territories, Canada
- Nearest city: Fort Simpson; Fort Liard; Nahanni Butte
- Coordinates: 61°36′00″N 125°41′06″W
- Area: 30,050 km^{2} (11,600 sq mi)
- Established: 1972
- Visitors: 1,104 (in 2022–23)
- Governing body: Parks Canada

UNESCO World Heritage Site
- Criteria: Natural: vii, viii
- Reference: 24
- Inscription: 1978 (2nd Session)

Tufa found in Nahanni National Park

The Nahanni National Park Reserve, sometimes known as "Headless Valley" or "Valley of The Headless Men" (after a series of unsolved historical deaths in the park), in the Dehcho Region of the Northwest Territories, Canada (approximately 500 km (310 mi) west of Yellowknife), protects a portion of the Mackenzie Mountains Natural Region. The centrepiece of the park is the South Nahanni River (Naha Dehé). Four noteworthy canyons, called First, Second, Third and Fourth Canyon, line the whitewater river. Each canyon has walls reaching some 1,000 m (3,300 ft) in height. The word nahanni comes from the local Dene name for the area, Nahʔa Dehé, which means "river of the land of the Nahʔa people". The park is inscribed as World Heritage Sites by UNESCO.

== Geography ==
There are several different landforms in the park that have taken millions of years to form, giving it a topographical diversity not seen in any other national park in Canada. Sediments, left by an ancient inland sea present some 500–200 million years ago, have since become pressed into coloured layers of rock. These layers, stacked about 6 km (3.7 mi) deep, are peppered with fossilised remnants of the varied organisms that once swam the ancient seas, beginning well before the time of the dinosaurs. As the continents shifted, the North American and Pacific Plates collided, the force of which forced layers of rock upwards. Ridges of rock thus bent and broke, leaving behind the mountain ranges seen today. This same action also causes volcanic activity, sending magma into (but not through) the sedimentary rock. While there are no active volcanoes in the park, towers of heated rock (igneous batholiths) were sent upwards, pushing the sediment further up. The top layer of sedimentary rock was eventually worn-away, resulting in granite towers that form the Ragged Range.

Over the last two million years, glaciers covered most of North America, creating most of the land formations seen on the continent today. While previous ice ages affected the park area, the most recent, the Wisconsin Ice Age (85,000–10,000 years ago), touched only the most western and eastern parts of the park. This has left many geological features in the park much more time to develop than most of North America had.

The central feature of the park is the South Nahanni River which runs the length of the park, beginning near Moose Ponds and ending when it meets the Liard River near Nahanni Butte. The South Nahanni is a rare example of an antecedent river. The mountains rose slowly enough, and the river was powerful enough, that it maintained its course over its history, meaning it has approximately the same path today as it did before the mountains rose. As the river was meandering, the canyons it carved while entrenching also meander. Most visitors only visit the portions from Virginia Falls (Nailicho) down.

There are four main canyons that line the South Nahanni River, named by prospectors, numbering them as they travelled upriver. The fourth canyon, also called Painted Canyon or Five Mile Canyon due to its length, begins with Virginia Falls, and was created as the falls eroded the limestone surrounding the river, working its way upstream. Third canyon runs through the Funeral Range, around 40 km (25 mi) long. Because its walls are composed of strata of shale, sandstones and limestone, this canyon has long slopes instead of steep, flat walls like the lower canyons. Big Bend, a point where the river does a 45-degree turn, marks the end of Third Canyon and the beginning of Second Canyon. At 15 km (9.3 mi) long, it runs through the Headless Range. The final canyon is considered the most beautiful. Beginning after Deadmen Valley, First Canyon boasts the highest, most vertical walls, cutting through very resistant limestone. It ends near Kraus Hotsprings, making it about 30 km (19 mi) long. Following this, the river slows and braids into different channels, passing through the park boundary, and coming together again near the village of Nahanni Butte. Soon after the town, the South Nahanni River joins the Liard River.

Notable mountains in the park include Mount Nirvana (61°52′29″N 127°40′49″W), officially an unnamed peak, which at 2,773 m (9,098 ft) is the highest mountain in the Northwest Territories. Slightly further north lies Mount Sir James MacBrien (62°07′23″N 127°40′47″W), the territories second highest peak at 2,759 m (9,052 ft), and Lotus Flower Tower (2,570 m (8,430 ft), 62°06′51.6″N 127°41′50.4″W) both of which form part of the Cirque of the Unclimbables (62°06′06″N 127°40′15″W).

== Virginia Falls ==
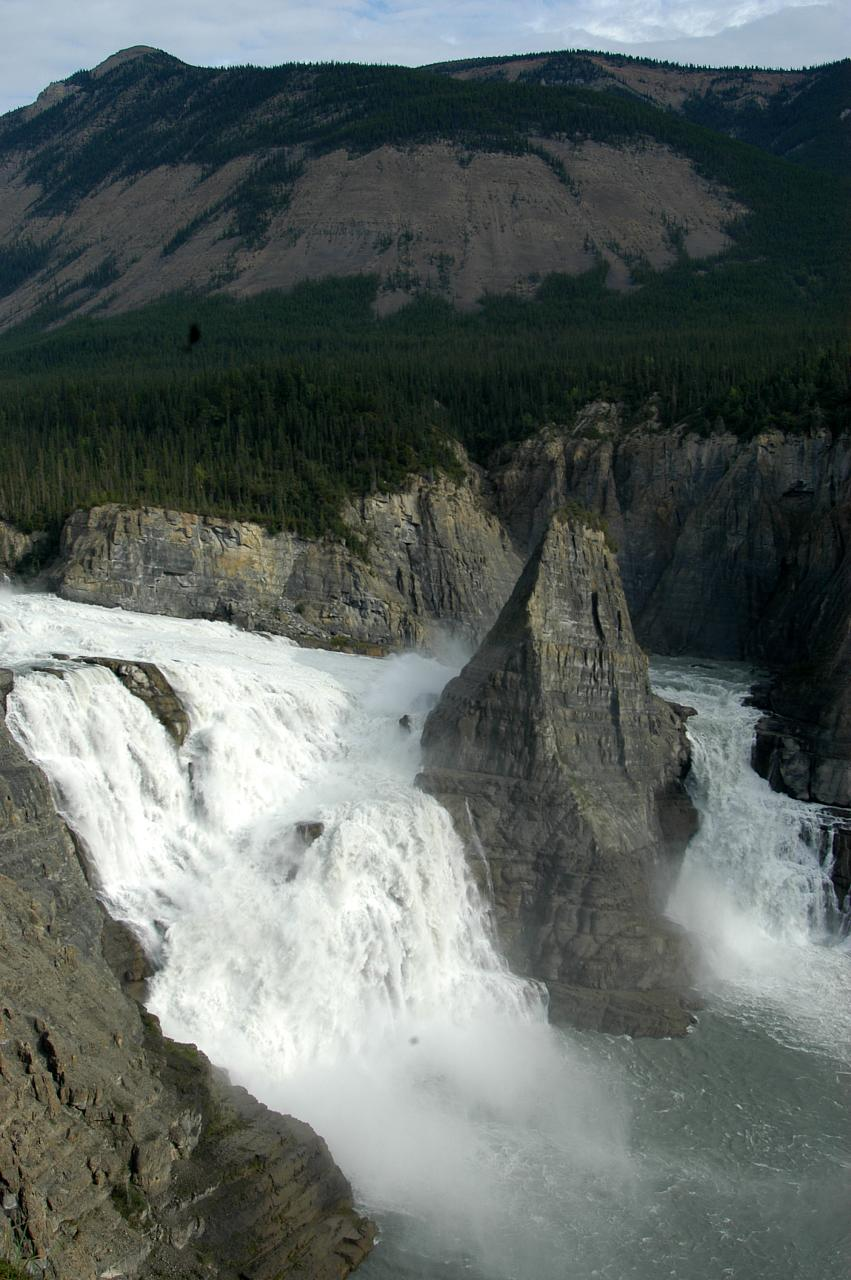
Virginia Falls and Mason's Rock

At Virginia Falls, or Nailicho in Dene (61°36′26″N 125°44′12″W), the river plunges 90 m (300 ft) into a thunderous plume. In the centre of the falls is a dramatic spire of resistant rock, "Mason's Rock", named after Bill Mason, the famous Canadian canoeist, author, and filmmaker. The falls were initially located downstream at the east end of Fourth Canyon, but, over the centuries, have carved their way backwards through the limestone that lines the river. This continuous erosion shifted the falls upstream and created the Fourth Canyon. Due to the constant mists created by the waterfalls, and the insulating cliff walls, a favourable microclimate in the immediate vicinity of the falls fosters a rich botanical biodiversity, including several boreal orchid species, such as Calypso bulbosa, Cypripedium parviflorum and passerinum, Galearis rotundifolia, and Platanthera aquilonis, huronensis and obtusata. Downstream from the falls are many infamous river rapids, sought-out by adventurers each year, including the well-known "Figure Eight", and "George's Riffle" and "Lafferty's Riffle".

== Rabbitkettle Hotsprings ==
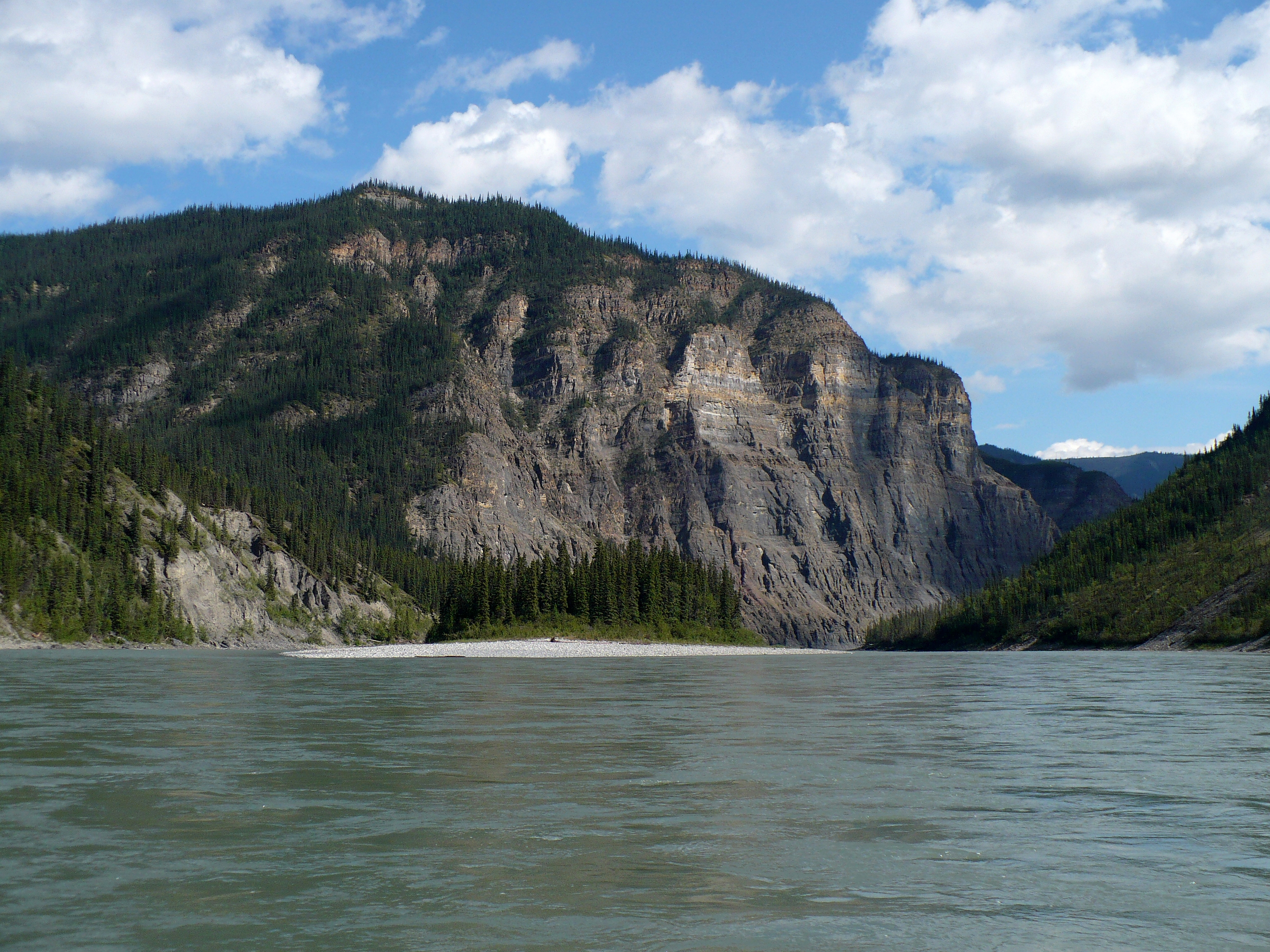
Third Canyon, Nahanni River

The Rabbitkettle (Gahnîhthah) Hotsprings and tufa mounds (61°56′36″N 127°10′49″W) are the largest of tufa mounds in Canada. The largest of the mounds, the North Mound, is 27 m (89 ft) high and 74 m (243 ft) across. The source of the springs comes from deep in the Earth's crust, near the base of the granite batholiths that form the Ragged Range. The volcanic activity that raised the mountains still heats the water deep below the surface of the Earth. The heated water percolates upwards, dissolving calcium carbonate from limestone deposits on its way by. When it reaches the surface springs, the water cools and the calcium carbonate particles are released. These microscopic particles settle to form porous calcite rims around the pools of water. These pools range in size from that of a bathtub to that of a fingernail. This process takes a great deal of time, and it is believed that the mounds themselves are around 10,000 years old, their creation beginning at the end of the last ice age.

These rare and fragile features are protected as a Zone 1, Special Preservation Area, and all visitors must be accompanied by Parks Canada staff in order to minimize impact and visitors to the North Mound are required to be barefoot.

== Flora and fauna ==
The park's sulphur hot springs, alpine tundra, mountain ranges, and forests of spruce and aspen are home to many species of birds, fish and mammals. The park lies within three of Canada's ecozones, the Taiga Cordillera in the west, the Taiga Plains in the east and a small southern portion in the Boreal Cordillera.

According to Parks Canada, there are about 42 mammal species in the park, in addition to around 180 types of bird, 16 fishes and a few hardy amphibians, with the wood frog being the most commonly-found in the region. In the State of the Park Report 2009, the NWT government named ten special-concern, threatened, or endangered species that the Nahanni National Park Reserve provides appropriate year-round or seasonal habitat for, according to the Committee on the Status of Endangered Wildlife in Canada (COSEWIC). These include the common nighthawk, grizzly bear, olive-sided flycatcher, peregrine falcon, rusty blackbird, short-eared owl, wood bison, woodland caribou, wolverine and yellow rail. In addition, the bull trout and the Nahanni aster are listed, but without status; the Canada warbler and western toad are listed as possibly existing in the park.

Mammal species found in the park include the American black bear, American mink, beaver, Arctic ground squirrel, Canada lynx, collared pika, Dall sheep, fisher, grey wolf, hoary bat, hoary marmot, least chipmunk, least weasel, moose, muskrat, northern myotis, mule deer, pine marten, red fox, red squirrel, river otter, Rocky Mountain goat, snowshoe hare, white-tailed deer and several types of shrew and vole.

Birds are numerous, and include American kestrel, bald and golden eagles, barred owl, belted kingfisher, boreal owl, black-capped and boreal chickadees, Canada goose, Canada jay, eared grebe, great grey owl, great horned owl, grouse, gulls, gyrfalcon, harlequin ducks, horned grebe, loons (the common, Pacific, red-throated and yellow-billed), mallards, northern harrier, northern shrike, osprey, pied-billed grebe, ptarmigan, redpoll, red-necked grebe, red phalarope, sandpipers and plovers, sharp-shinned hawk, snow goose, surf scoter, swallows, woodpeckers and sapsuckers, and trumpeter and tundra swans. It also includes the only known nesting site of the whooping crane.

Fish found in the park include, Arctic grayling, burbot, inconnu, lake trout, lake chub, lake whitefish, longnose dace, longnose sucker, mountain whitefish, northern pike, round whitefish, slimy sculpin, spoonhead sculpin, spottail shiner and trout-perch.

The diverse range of soils offers several specialized and uncommon habitats. More than 700 species of vascular plants and 300 species of both bryophytes and lichen can be found in the park, giving it a richer variety than any other area in the NWT. Nahanni aster is a very rare species of aster found only in the Park.

== History ==
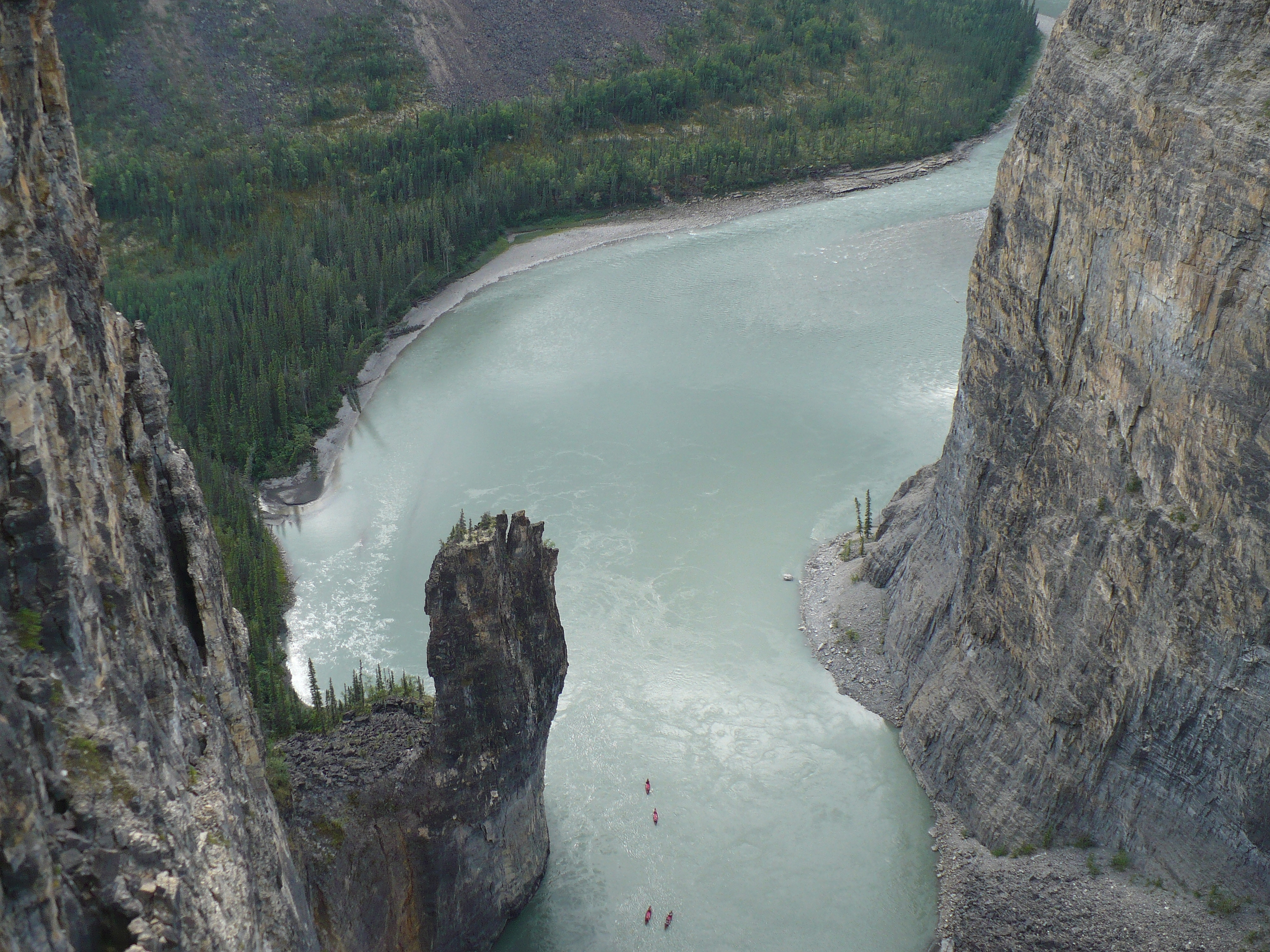
The Gate, Second Canyon

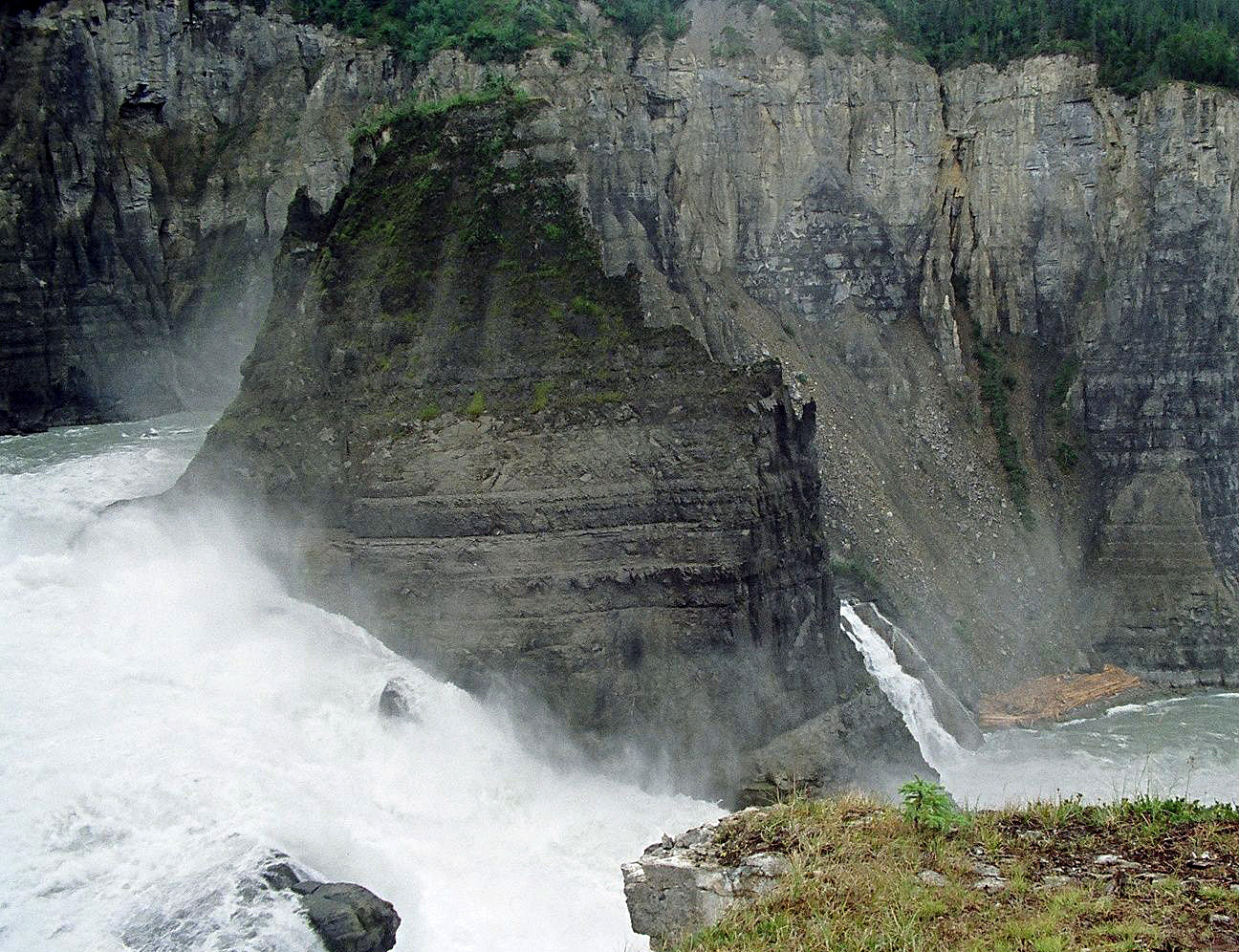
Mason's Rock in the centre of Virginia Falls

The Dene, sometimes called Slavey peoples, have used the lands around Nahanni National Park Reserve for thousands of years. The first human occupation of the area is estimated to have occurred 9,000-10,000 years ago. Evidence of prehistoric human use has been found at Yohin Lake and a few other sites within the park. The local oral history contains many references to the Naha tribe, a mountain-dwelling people who used to raid settlements in the adjacent lowlands. These people are said to have rather quickly and mysteriously disappeared.

First contact with European fur traders expanding into the region occurred in the 18th century, and was increased with Alexander Mackenzie's exploration of the Mackenzie River (Deh Cho), and building of trading posts at Fort Simpson and Fort Liard. At both of these John McLeod, a Scottish explorer of the area, was to serve as manager. During the 19th century, most Dene families left their nomadic lifestyles and settled into more permanent communities, often close to the trading posts. Permanent settlements were established at locations such as Nahanni Butte, Fort Liard and Fort Simpson.

In the late 19th century, the Mountain Indians of the Nahanni region would travel down the Nahanni River each spring in mooseskin boats to trade the winter take of furs. These boats, based on the York boats used by the Hudson's Bay Company, were up to 20 m (66 ft) in length. Constructed from six to ten untanned moose hides sewn together and stretched over a spruce pole frame, these boats would transport entire families, their dogs and cargo of furs down the river during high water. Upon arrival the boat was dismantled and the hides traded along with the furs. Following a visit to the forts, these people would return to the high country with only what they could carry on their pack dogs.

The stories of the Naha, and dangerous landscape that they inhabited, grew in stature with the Klondike Gold Rush as some explorers attempted to use the Nahanni as a path to the famous gold fields of the Yukon, or to try and make their fortune on the Flat and South Nahanni Rivers. Although no significant gold was recovered, legends of haunted valleys and lost gold emerged after the headless corpses of Métis prospectors Willie and Frank McLeod were found around 1908. The Lost McLeod Mine, a legendary lost mine somewhere in the park, is supposed to have been where the two brothers found their gold. In the years that followed, mysterious deaths of other prospectors added to the legends. Alternative names given to the park, which include Deadmen Valley, Headless Creek, Headless Range and the Funeral Range, bear testimony to these stories and legends. In later years, Albert Faille was a prospector in the area and met writer Raymond M. Patterson. The latter's works brought minor fame to Faille.

In 1946 Calgary geologist and mining expert Frank M. W. Henderson returned from the valley reporting his partner John Patterson had disappeared. Henderson and Patterson had agreed to meet at a point near Virginia Falls. The first to arrive would leave a message on a large tree which both knew from previous trips. Henderson arrived first and left his message before travelling into the valley. He returned several weeks later only to find there was still no message left by Patterson. Henderson and his party of Indigenous packers camped there a few days, but one night he was awoken by a member of his party who warned of "white figures" moving along the valley. Despite Henderson's argument that it was simply a reflection of the Aurora Borealis, he was unable to convince his companions, who left soon after the incident, to stay with him.

In 1947 author Pierre Berton was sent by The Vancouver Sun to cover the north. He, along with pilot Russ Baker, flew up the Headless Valley. Writing on his journey for Macleans Berton remarked, "Frank Henderson himself, a man who perhaps has good reason not to want too many people rushing into the valley, was quoted as saying, on his return from the area last fall, 'There is absolutely no denying the sinister atmosphere of that whole valley. The weird, continual wailing of the wind is something I won't soon forget.'"

In 1964, explorer parachutist Jean Poirel from Montreal jumped at its source 500 km (310 mi) north of Yellowknife, followed by his teammate Bertrand Bordet. Jean Poirel imagined the idea of going down the river with inflatable dinghies. During the following four consecutive expeditions in the valley Jean Poirel discovered more than 250 caverns. The most important contained 116 Dall sheep's skeletons (carbon-14 dated to 2500 years BC); Jean Poirel named it "Valerie Cavern" after his daughter. He took topographic notes and drew detailed maps, paving the way for the park's creation. During his last expedition in 1972, he escorted Pierre Trudeau, who came to evaluate the region.

=== Park history ===
Originally established in 1972, by then Prime Minister Pierre Elliot Trudeau, the park was 4,766 km^{2} (1,840 sq mi) in area. The park was in "reserve" status pending settlement of outstanding Aboriginal land claims in the region. In 2003, an agreement between the Dehcho First Nations and Parks Canada gave temporary protection to 23,000 km^{2} (8,900 sq mi). In August 2007, the federal government added an extra 5,400 km^{2} (2,100 sq mi).

In a novel form of cooperation between federal government and native groups, the Naha Dehe Consensus Team was formed in June 2000 by Canada and the Dehcho First Nations. Their original main tasks included:

1. prepare an Ecological Integrity Statement,
2. complete a review of the Park Management Plan,
3. prepare an Interim Park Management Arrangement, and
4. prepare a Memorandum of Understanding Respecting Park Expansion.

In 2003, these were completed and the purpose of the team changed, now dealing with cooperative management issues, according to the Interim Park Management Arrangement, until the Dehcho Process is completed.

On 9 June 2009 the Government of Canada, with the Dehcho First Nations, announced legislation that will increase the area of Nahanni National Park to cover 30,050 km^{2} (11,600 sq mi), including 91% of the Greater Nahanni ecosystem in the Dehcho Region and most of the South Nahanni River watershed.

The new park area is estimated to be the home of around 500 grizzly bears, two herds of woodland caribou, as well as species of alpine sheep and goats and other species. The new boundary will include the highest mountains and largest ice fields in the Northwest Territories. With the expansion of the park there have been several added designated landing sites. Because most access to the park is done by aircraft and air access is restricted in the park, there are set places aircraft can land. Before the expansion these were limited to Virginia Falls and Rabbitkettle Lake. Now there are five more: the Bunny Bar, Island Lake, Honeymoon Lake, Glacier Lake, and Seaplane Lake. However, only Virginia Falls and Glacier Lake are designated for day use visitation, meaning all other sites require visitors to stay overnight in the park.

A visitor centre in Fort Simpson features displays on the history, culture and geography of the area. The park was among the world's first four natural heritage locations to be inscribed as World Heritage Sites by UNESCO in 1978. The South Nahanni River achieved Canadian Heritage River status in 1987. Presently around 800–1000 people visit the park every year, most of which are overnight visitors who travel down the South Nahanni. The park is open year-round, but most visitors come in June, July, and August. Virginia Falls is the only area of the park where a reservation is required, which must be done months in advance to prevent overcrowding. For safety reasons, all visitors must register with park officials upon entering the park boundaries, and de-register within 24 hours of leaving. There is a park office in Nahanni Butte at the end of the river, where visitors can de-register. The only practical way to get to Nahanni National Park is by floatplane or by helicopter, usually from Fort Simpson but other communities and locations offering a gateway into the park include: Watson Lake, Muncho Lake, Fort Nelson and Inconnu Lodge. Some people do hike in from the Nahanni Range Road at Tungsten to the west of the park.

In 2007 the park was voted one of the Seven Wonders of Canada in a competition sponsored by CBC Television's The National and CBC Radio One's Sounds Like Canada. The park was the subject of a short film in 2011's National Parks Project, directed by Kevin McMahon and scored by Shad, Jace Lasek and Olga Goreas.

== Recognition ==
=== International and national designations ===
- 1978 – Nahanni National Park Reserve became the first site in the world to be inscribed as a UNESCO World Heritage Site, recognized for its wilderness landscape, extensive river systems, waterfalls, and deep limestone canyons.
- 1987 – The protected portion of the South Nahanni River was designated a Canadian Heritage River, in recognition of its outstanding wilderness character and recreational value.
- 2007 – The park was voted one of the Seven Wonders of Canada in a national competition sponsored by CBC Television’s The National and CBC Radio One’s Sounds Like Canada.

=== Film and documentary ===
- 1962 – Nahanni, a documentary by the National Film Board of Canada exploring historic perspectives of the South Nahanni River, received international and national recognition following its release.
- 2011 – The park was featured in The National Parks Project, a short film directed by Kevin McMahon and scored by Shad, Jace Lasek, and Olga Goreas.
- 2019 – Nahanni: River of Forgiveness, a Canadian documentary centred on a traditional Dene expedition down the Nahanni River, was nominated for Best Cinematography at the Canadian Screen Awards.

=== Literature and fiction ===
- 1937 – The region inspired Sick Heart River, a novel by John Buchan, 1st Baron Tweedsmuir, which features a fictional river set in the Nahanni area.
- 1973 – The Nahanni River and its surrounding landscape were featured in La Vallée sans homme, a French novel by Roger Frison-Roche.

== See also ==
- Nááts'ihch'oh National Park Reserve
- List of National Parks of Canada
- List of protected areas of the Northwest Territories
- Nahanni Formation
- 1985 Nahanni earthquakes
