= Northern green orchid =

Northern green orchid is a common name for several plants and may refer to:

- Platanthera aquilonis, species of orchid native to the United States and Canada
- Platanthera hyperborea, small orchid found only in Greenland, Iceland, and Akimiski Island
