= List of lost mines =

The lost mine is a popular form of lost treasure legend. There are many examples around the world, and several common themes can be traced throughout the various legends. Usually the mines are said to contain valuable elements or minerals such as gold, silver or diamonds. Often there is a map or other document allegedly detailing the history or location of the mine. Common to all the lost mine legends is the idea of a valuable and mysterious resource being lost to history. Some lost mine legends have a historical basis, and some have none. Regardless, the lure of these legends is attested by the many books on the subject, and the popularity of publications such as Lost Treasure magazine.

== List of lost mine legends ==
This list is inexhaustive, but provides some well known examples from around the world.

=== Africa ===
- King Solomon's Mines

=== Australia ===
- Lasseter's Reef

=== Brazil ===
- Muribeca mine

=== Canada ===
- Lost Lemon Mine, Alberta
- Pitt Lake gold find, British Columbia
- Jolly Jack's Lost Mine, British Columbia
- Lost McLeod Mine, Northwest Territories
- Johanssen's Lost Platinum Cache, British Columbia
- Foster's Lost Mine, Vancouver Island
- Lost Christie Lead, British Columbia
- Lost Silver Lead of Monashee Creek, British Columbia

=== Colombia ===
- Chivor emerald mine

=== Mexico ===
- Lost diamond mine of Vicente Guerrero
- Lost Naranjal mine, Durango
- Planchas de Plata, Sonora, (sometimes called Bolas de Plata).
- Tayopa silver mine, Sonora

=== Russia ===
- In the 19th century, gold fever was prevalent in the Ural region near Yekaterinburg. There are many legends of the lost mines, for example in Dmitry Mamin-Sibiryak's stories.
- There are many modern stories of lost diamond mines in the Sakha region of north and northeast Russia.

=== United States ===
==== Arizona ====
- Lost Dutchman's Gold Mine, Arizona
- Iron Door Mine, Arizona

==== California ====
- Lost Pegleg mine, California; supposedly found by mountain man Thomas "Pegleg" Smith.
- Lost Breyfogle mine, California or Nevada
- The Lost Cement Mine, California
- The Lost Dutch Oven Mine, California
- Death Valley Scotty's secret mine, California Nevada
- Lost Padre Mine, southern California

==== Colorado ====
- Three Skeletons, La Plata County, Colorado

==== Idaho ====
- The Wheelbarrow Mine, Idaho

==== Kentucky ====
- Swift's silver mine, Kentucky

==== Missouri ====
- Yocum silver mine, Stone County, Missouri

==== Nevada ====
- The Lost Sheepherders Mine, Jarbidge Wilderness, Nevada

==== New Mexico ====
- Lost Adams Diggings, New Mexico or Arizona
- Treasure of Victorio Peak, White Sands, New Mexico

==== Oregon ====
- Lost Blue Bucket Mine, Oregon
- Two Frenchmen Mine, Oregon

==== Texas ====
- Lost Nigger Gold Mine, Texas
- San Saba mine (sometimes called the Lost Bowie mine or the Lost Almagres mine), Texas

==== Utah ====
- Lost Rhoades Mine, Utah

==== Washington ====
- Danville's Lost Gold Ledge, Washington (state)
- Janni's chimney, Washington (state)
- Lost Doukhobor Ledge, Washington (state)

== See also ==
- List of missing treasures
- Treasure hunting
- Treasure map
