= Cladonia scotteri =

Scientific classification
- Kingdom: Fungi
- Division: Ascomycota
- Class: Lecanoromycetes
- Order: Lecanorales
- Family: Cladoniaceae
- Genus: Cladonia
- Species: C. scotteri

Binomial name
- Cladonia scotteri Ahti & E.S.Hansen (2011)
- Holotype: Nahanni National Park Reserve, Northwest Territories, Canada

Species of lichen-forming fungus

Cladonia scotteri (Scotter's lichen) is a species of lichen in the family Cladoniaceae. Described in 2011 from Nahanni National Park Reserve in the Northwest Territories, Canada, this mainly tundra lichen forms a persistent mat of small, grey-to-brown squamules (scale-like lobes). It also produces short, club-shaped podetia (upright stalks) with a distinctly checkered surface, usually topped with brown apothecia (fruiting bodies). It grows mainly on calcareous (lime-rich) soils in Arctic and subarctic regions, and is recorded from western North America, Greenland, and northeastern Asia (with one reported record from the Antarctic Peninsula).

== Taxonomy ==
Cladonia scotteri was described as a new species by Teuvo Ahti and Eric Steen Hansen in 2011, based on collections from northern North America and Greenland. The type specimen (the reference specimen for the name) was gathered in 1977 in Nahanni National Park (Northwest Territories, Canada), on a trampled path near Virginia Falls. The species epithet scotteri and a vernacular name, "Scotter's lichen", honours the Canadian wildlife range ecologist George Scotter, who collected large numbers of lichens in Arctic and boreal Canada, including material of this species.

The species is placed in the Cladonia cariosa group (a cluster of closely similar species) and appears most closely related to C. cariosa and C. symphycarpa. Compared with C. symphycarpa, C. scotteri typically has smaller squamules that are usually not pruinose (not covered in a powdery coating), and generally has smaller podetia (upright stalks). It also differs in chemistry: many specimens contain the lichen substance homosekikaic acid in addition to atranorin. In Greenland, several chemotypes (chemical variants) have been recorded, based on different combinations of lichen substances detected using thin-layer chromatography (a laboratory screening method).

A DNA-based study of relationships within the Cladonia cariosa group suggested that C. scotteri is closely related to C. cariosa. However, it was not included in the study's main phylogenetic analysis because only one publicly available ITS (internal transcribed spacer) sequence was available, and that sequence appeared to be uneven in quality.

== Description ==
The primary thallus forms a persistent mat of small squamules (scale-like lobes) that are grey to brown, often darkening with age or weathering. Podetia (upright stalks) are produced sparingly. They are usually short, about 5–20 mm tall (occasionally taller), and typically club-shaped (clavate) to slender. The podetia have a firm outer layer (they are corticate) along their full length. Their surface is distinctly "checkered", made up of small, flat patches (areolae), and they do not form cups (they are ascyphous). Small squamules on the podetia occur mainly near the base and are not abundant.

Fruiting bodies are common. The podetia become fertile early and usually bear apothecia (sexual fruiting bodies) with brown discs. Asexual spore-producing structures (conidiomata/pycnidia) can occur on the primary squamules, but they are uncommon and can be easy to miss. In standard chemical spot tests, the thallus shows a yellow K reaction (K+) and a weak yellow PD reaction (PD+). The lichen substances reported for the species include atranorin and (often) homosekikaic acid. More rarely, specimens contain only homosekikaic acid, and rangiformic acid has been reported only exceptionally.

== Habitat and distribution ==
Cladonia scotteri grows on soil, most often on calcareous (lime-rich) ground, but it has also been recorded on somewhat acidic, humus-rich soils. It is primarily a tundra species, though it has also been recorded in boreal forest habitats. The type collection from Nahanni National Park was made on disturbed ground along a trampled path near a waterfall lookout, indicating that the species can occur on lightly disturbed soil surfaces.

In Greenland, it is fairly common in the west but much rarer in the east. Beyond Greenland, records extend across western North America and northeastern Asia. Its full range is still being clarified because older herbarium material from several regions likely includes additional specimens that have not yet been reviewed. Documented records include Arctic and subarctic North America (for example, the Northwest Territories and Alaska), montane sites farther south in western North America (including the southwestern United States), northeastern Asia (parts of Siberia), and one locality on the Antarctic Peninsula.

== See also ==
- List of Cladonia species
