= Rabbitkettle Hot Springs =

Thermal spring in Northwest Territories, Canada

- Location within Northwest Territories
- Interactive map of Rabbitkettle Hot Springs
- Name origin: Dene
- Location: Nahanni National Park Reserve, Northwest Territories
- Coordinates: 61°56′N 127°10′W
- Type: hot spring
- Temperature: 21 °C (70 °F)

Rabbitkettle Hot Springs is a naturally occurring hot spring located in the Northwest Territories of Canada. The springs are found in the Nahanni National Park Reserve, along the South Nahanni River. Rabbitkettle Hot Springs are situated on a limestone plateau and comprise two large travertine mounds. At 20 metres (66 ft) high and 70 m (230 ft) in diameter, the free-standing North Mound is the largest travertine mound in Canada. The South Mound has grown into a nearby hillside and is not as tall. They are the only tufa mounds in the world known to be located on permafrost. The mounds are multi-coloured and tiered.

The name Rabbitkettle comes from the Dene word gahnhthah, meaning "kettle". The translation was adopted by English-speaking locals as "Rabbitkettle", from the peculiar shapes of the basins in the area. The springs were considered a sacred place to the Dene, who left offerings such as tobacco to ensure good fortune.

== Formation ==
The water in the springs originates from a fault in the limestone plateau, and the mechanics of piping pseudokarst draw hot water from nearly 2,000 m (6,600 ft) deep in the earth upwards through the fault.

The water emerges in a central pool at the top of the mound and flows downward through a terrace of surrounding pools. The travertine walls of these pools can be as tall as 30 cm (12 in), and range in colour from grey to off-white. The spring water is rich in dissolved minerals from the limestone, such as calcium carbonate. These minerals are deposited on any surface the water flows over, gradually coating it and forming tufa structures known as rimstone dams and gours. Eventually, the older pools begin to fill with deposited minerals, which causes the water to spill over the edges and form new pools.

The pools were formed after the end of the last glacial period, some 10,000 years ago, when the continental ice caps retreated.

== Visitors ==
Due to the fragile nature of the tufa structures, tourists are only permitted to visit the hot springs with guided tours run by park staff. Visitors must remove their shoes and walk barefoot on a prescribed path to get close to the North Mound.

== See also ==
- Virginia Falls (Northwest Territories)
- Rabbitkettle Formation
