= Naranjal mine =

The Naranjal mine (more commonly known as El Naranjal) is the name of a legendary lost gold mine in the Sierra Mountains of Mexico. Folklorist J. Frank Dobie devoted part of his book "Apache Gold and Yaqui Silver" to the story of this legendary lost gold mine.

The mine was supposedly located at the bottom of a canyon, beside a river and an abandoned hacienda. Surrounding the site were groves of oranges, hence the name El Naranjal, which means the orange grove in Spanish. Alternately, some legends point to orange-colored gold ore from the mine as a source of the name.

Unlike other lost or legendary mines in this area, there is little hard evidence it ever existed, and may be purely a legend, taken from garbled accounts of the far more popular legendary lost mines of Tayopa.

== See also ==
- Lost mines

== Sources ==
- Dobie, J. Frank, Apache Gold & Yaqui Silver. Boston: Little, Brown. 1939.
