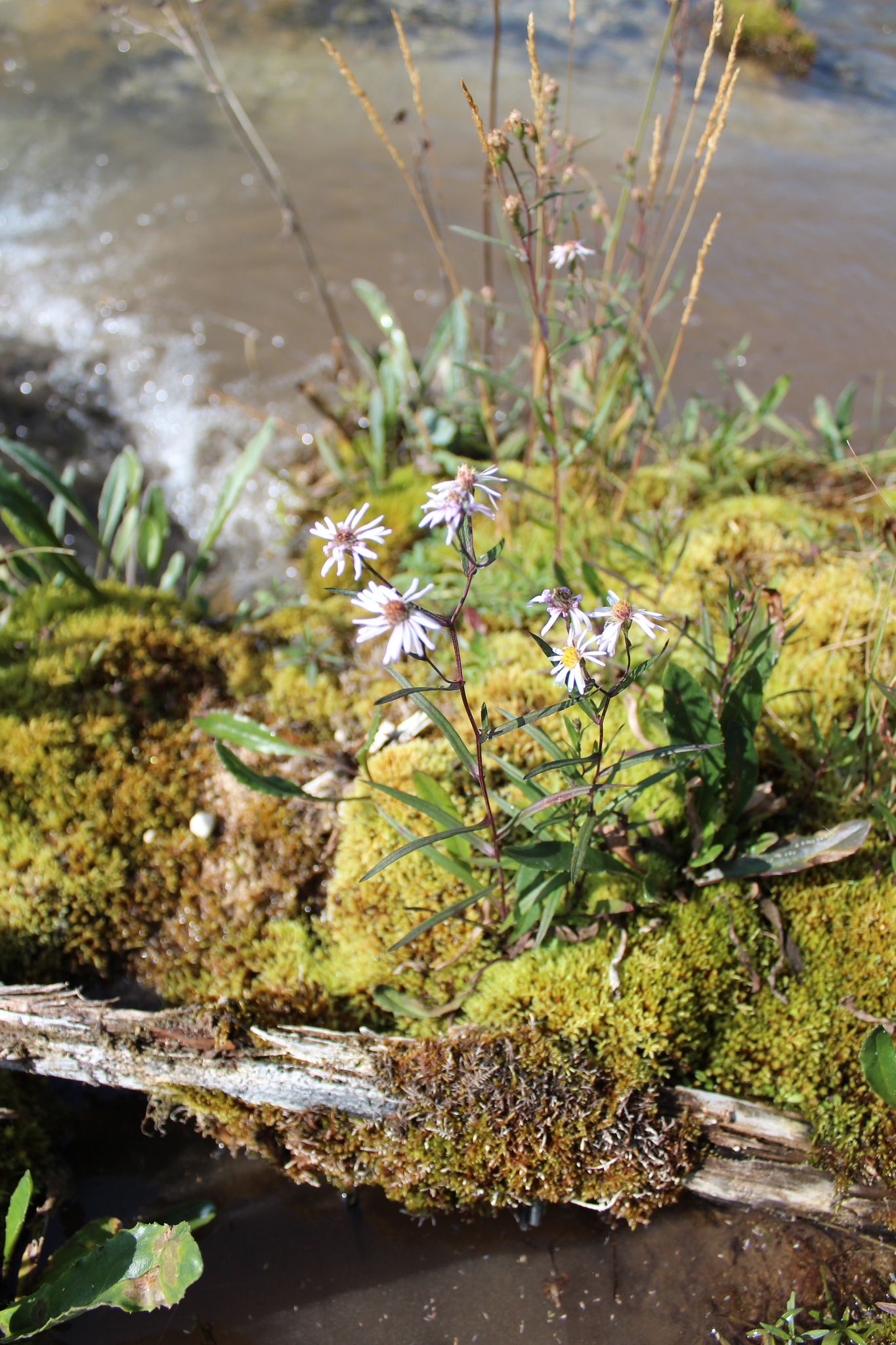

Conservation status
- Near Threatened (IUCN 3.1)

- Vulnerable (NatureServe)

Scientific classification
- Kingdom: Plantae
- Clade: Tracheophytes
- Clade: Angiosperms
- Clade: Eudicots
- Clade: Asterids
- Order: Asterales
- Family: Asteraceae
- Tribe: Astereae
- Subtribe: Symphyotrichinae
- Genus: Symphyotrichum
- Subgenus: Symphyotrichum subg. Symphyotrichum
- Section: Symphyotrichum sect. Symphyotrichum
- Species: S. nahanniense

Binomial name
- Symphyotrichum nahanniense (Cody) Semple
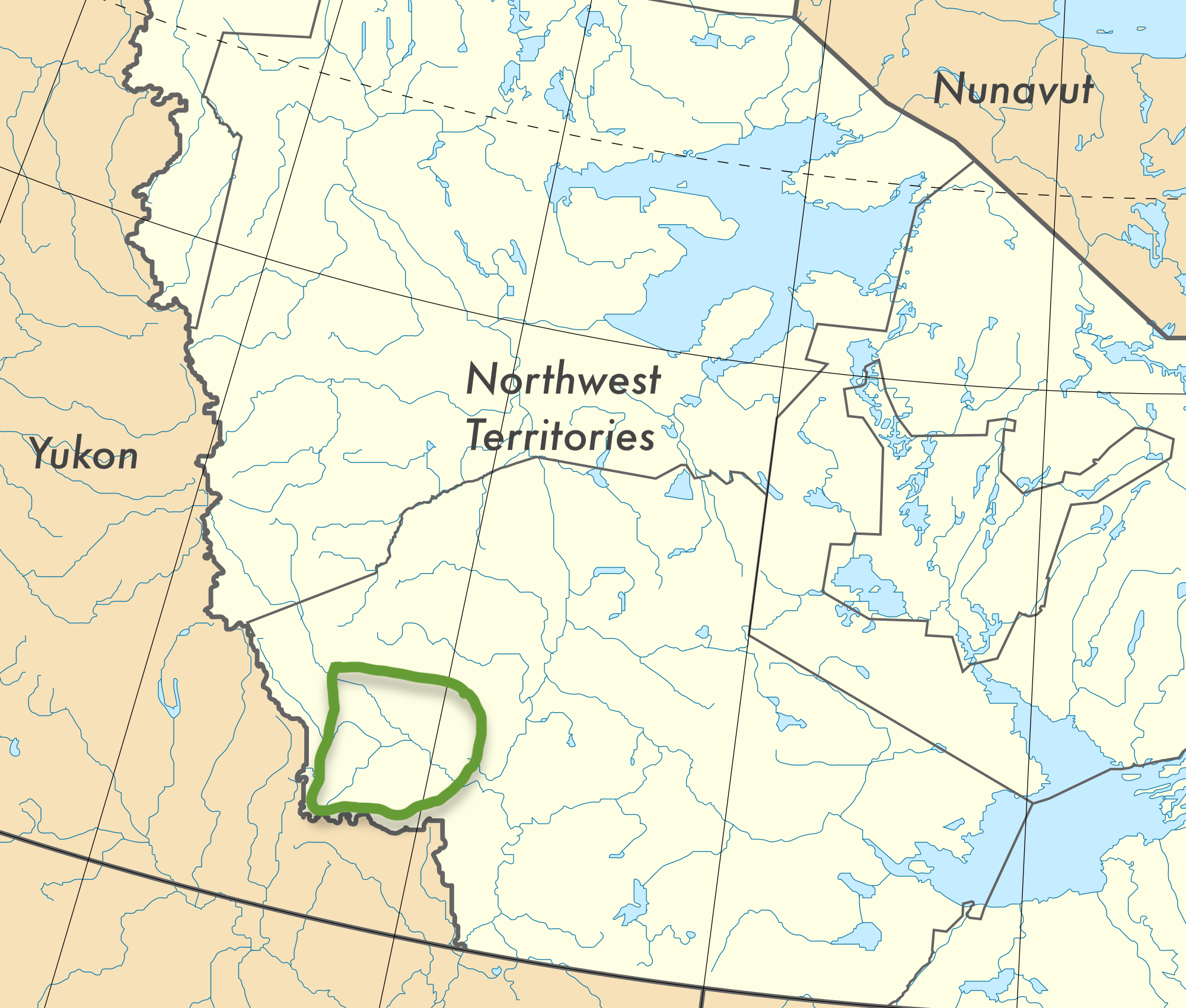
- General range of S. nahanniense locations at hot springs within Nahanni National Park Reserve outlined in green 61°32′50″N 125°35′22″W

Synonyms
- Aster nahanniensis Cody

= Symphyotrichum nahanniense =

Species of plant in the aster family

Symphyotrichum nahanniense (formerly Aster nahanniensis) is a species of flowering plant in the family Asteraceae endemic to Northwest Territories, Canada.

== Description ==
Commonly known as Nahanni aster, it is a perennial, herbaceous plant that grows about 7 to 39 centimetres (3 to 15 inches) in height. Its flowers have white to pale rose, often becoming rose-violet, ray florets and yellow then reddish disk florets.

== Distribution and habitat ==
The species grows only within Nahanni National Park Reserve and has been found at seven hot mineral springs locations within the Park. A survey conducted in 2019 recorded about 130,000 plants.

== Gallery ==
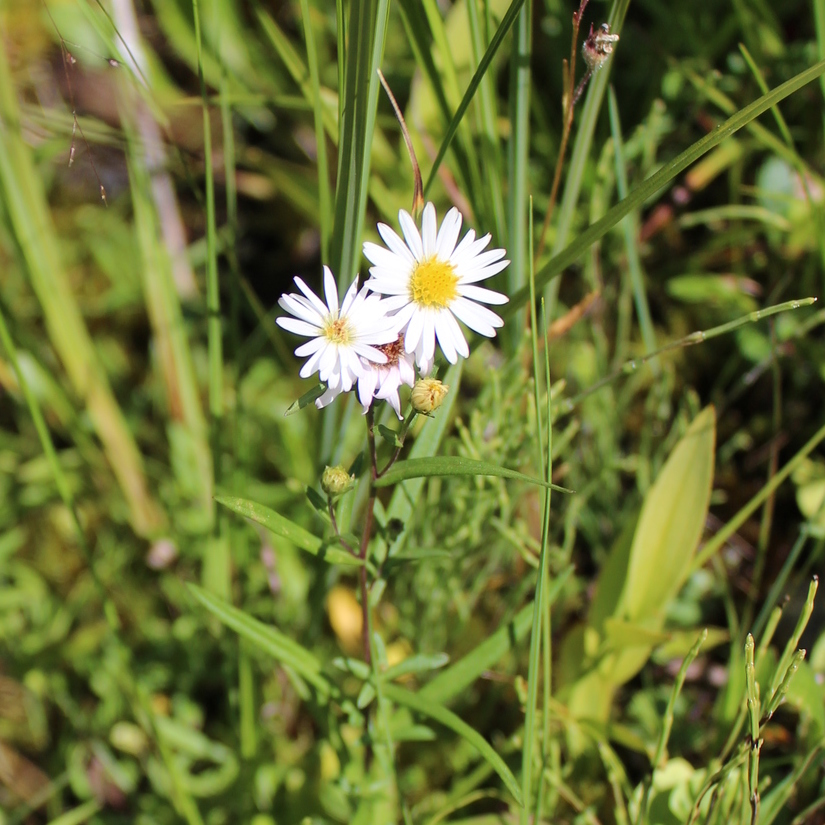

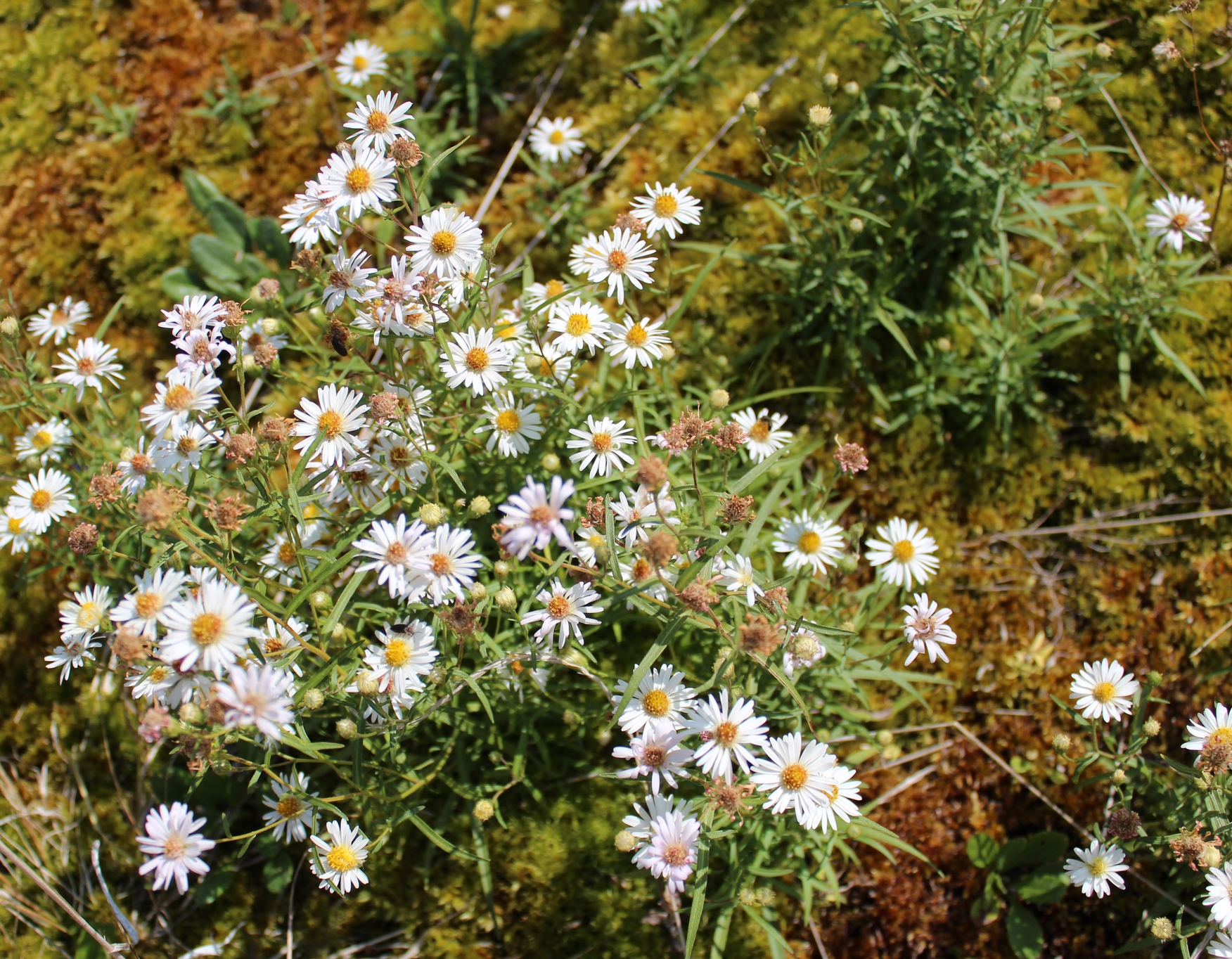
