= Lost McLeod Mine =

Legend of a lost mine in the Northwest Territories of Canada

Lost McLeod Mine is a legend of a lost mine in the Northwest Territories of Canada. The story has been featured in many books and magazines. The events in the legend have led to geographic locations in the Northwest Territories being named Headless Valley and Headless Creek located in Nahanni National Park Reserve. A creek called Sheep Creek was renamed McLeod Creek in honour of the McLeod Brothers. Twenty people have died searching for the mine.

== See also ==
- Lost mines
- Nahanni National Park Reserve
