= Nááts'ihch'oh National Park Reserve =

National park reserve in the Northwest Territories, Canada

- Réserve de parc national Nááts'įhch'oh
- IUCN category II (national park)
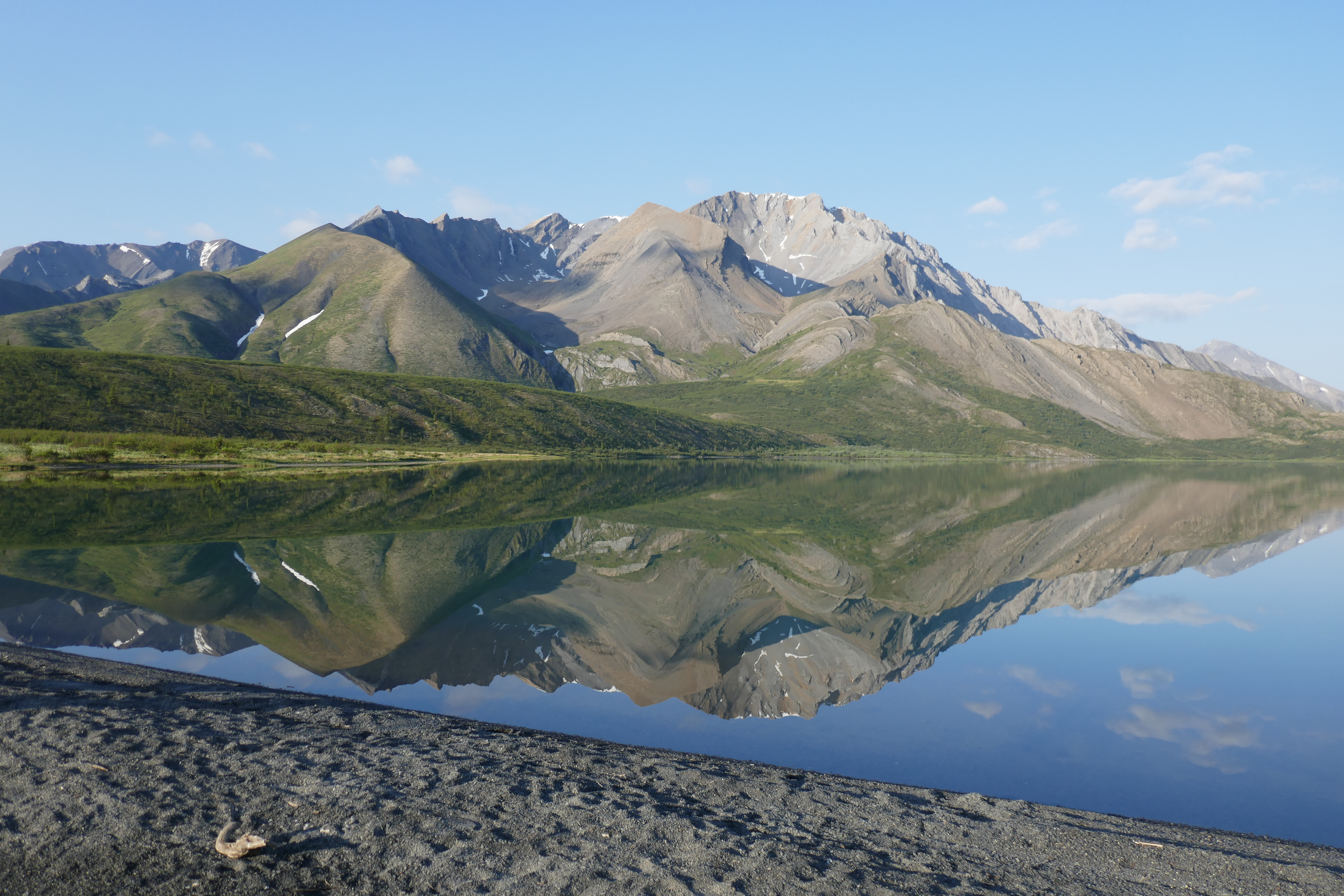
- Nı́onep'eneɂ Lake

- Location within Canada Location within Northwest Territories
- Interactive map of Nááts'ihch'oh National Park Reserve
- Location: Northwest Territories, Canada
- Nearest city: Tulita
- Coordinates: 62°15′N 128°15′W
- Area: 4,895 km^{2} (1,890 sq mi)
- Established: December 18, 2014
- Visitors: 103 (in 2025–26)
- Governing body: Parks Canada

Náátsʼihchʼoh National Park Reserve (/ˈnætsiːtʃoʊ/ NATS-ee-choh) is a Canadian national park reserve, located in the Northwest Territories and encompassing areas of the South Nahanni River watershed. The name means "stands like a porcupine" in the Chipewyan language (Dene language). The national park reserve covers an area of 4,895 km^{2} (1,890 sq mi), protecting the Sahtú Settlement Area of the upper South Nahanni watershed, which adjoins the Nahanni National Park Reserve; the two adjacent areas are, however, managed separately (similarly to Banff and Jasper, two adjacently-situated parks in Alberta).

== Features ==
Náátsʼihchʼoh National Park Reserve, which lies within the Mackenzie Mountains, takes its name from Nááts'ı̨hch'oh (Mount Wilson) at the north end of the park. Nááts'ı̨hch'oh is the Slavey language (Shúhtagot'ine) description of the mountain, meaning "standing like a porcupine quill", a reference to its unique shape—sharp and pointed on the top, much like a porcupine's quill. The mountain itself is credited with great powers. The area has been well-travelled and long valued for hunting and its wealth of natural resources; the entire region is of great personal value and cultural importance for the Shúhtaot'ine (Mountain Dene, a Sahtu group), of Tulita and Norman Wells.

The main waterways through the area are the South Nahanni (Tehjeh Deé) and the Broken Skull Rivers (Pı̨́ı̨́p'enéh łéetǫ́ǫ́ Deé), the latter merging with the South Nahanni. Paddlers can descend the South Nahanni's "rock garden" by starting at Nááts'ı̨hch'oh Tué (Moose Ponds), or take the less technically-difficult Broken Skull River (Pı̨́ı̨́p'enéh łéetǫ́ǫ́ Deé). The highest peaks within the park are Nááts'ı̨hch'oh (Mount Wilson), at 2,245 m (7,365 ft), and an unnamed peak, at 2,456 m (8,058 ft), near Nı́onep'eneɂ Tué (Nı́onep'eneɂ Lake: Grizzly Bear Lake).

Fauna of the region includes many iconic North American species, such as American black bear, grizzly bear, northwestern wolf, boreal woodland caribou and western moose, in addition to Dall sheep and Rocky Mountain goats in the montane areas (the northernmost Canadian population of the latter). Smaller mammalian species present include various rodents and lagomorphs, such as Arctic hare, beaver, collared pika, hoary marmot, muskrat, porcupine and snowshoe hare. These largely herbivorous animals are, in turn, followed by and hunted by several species of smaller carnivores, including the Canada lynx, red fox, marten, mink, ermine, and the largest mustelid, the wolverine. In the riverine habitats North American river otters hunt for fish.

== Park creation ==
The intention to create a park reserve was announced by the Government of Canada on April 7, 2008, with establishment to follow a negotiated impact and benefit plan between the government and the Sahtu Dene and Métis. The government signed a Memorandum of Understanding with the "Sahtú organizations (land corporations) established under the land claim agreement representing the Dene and Métis of the Tulita District". The federal government contributed CAD$500,000 to assist the land corporations and help aboriginal communities develop an impact and benefit plan. The area is becoming industrialized with "roads, pipelines, exploration for minerals, oil and natural gas, and development of mines and wells". The park will prohibit the opening of new mines, but existing claims will be respected. Originally, the land was meant to be used for an extension of Nahanni National Park Reserve, but the Dene and Métis people in the Sahtu Region lobbied for a plan that would make their area of land different from Nahanni, which is claimed by the Dene of the Dehcho Region.

On February 26, 2003, the Government of Canada announced the withdrawal of approximately 7,600 km^{2} (2,900 sq mi) of land for the establishment of the park. The official announcement was made on April 7, 2008, by Federal Environment Minister John Baird who said, "with this historic agreement announced today, we are once again taking action to protect Canada's North for future generations." It was the fifth conservation related announcement made by the government within a year.

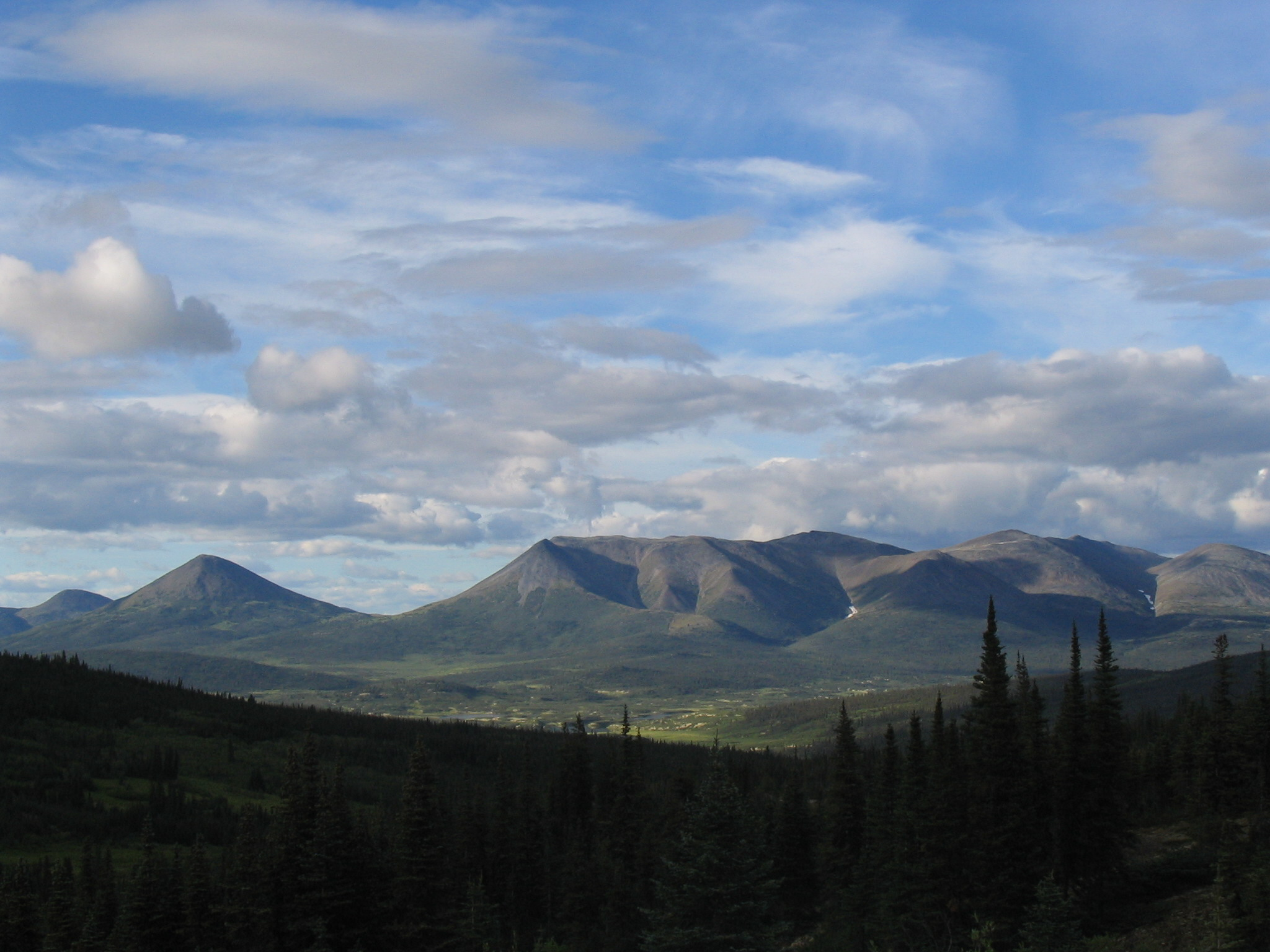
Park land near Howard's Pass

Following the announcement, three plans for the park boundaries were proposed. The region is known for its mineral potential, and mining companies were concerned that the park would limit their access to these minerals. The first scenario would have made the park 6,450 km^{2} (2,490 sq mi), protected 94 per cent of the upper watershed of the South Nahanni River, 95 per cent of the grizzly bear habitat and 81 per cent of the woodland caribou summer habitat, leaving 20 per cent of the overall mineral potential outside of the park's boundaries and potentially available for development. The Government of Canada chose the third option for the final park boundary that leaves 70 per cent of the overall mineral potential outside the park while retaining 70 per cent of the grizzly bear habitat and 44 per cent of the summer calving grounds of the woodland caribou herd within the park boundary." During negotiations, concerns were raised about the impact that mining the region would have on the South Nahanni watershed. Mining industry representatives, however, said "even the third option would limit access to areas with big potential for development. But of the three plans it was their preferred choice. They said mining could be carried out in environmentally sustainable ways and it would bring economic benefits to local residents."

In March 2012, federal, Dene and Métis representatives signed an impact and benefit plan for the park reserve. That August, prime minister Stephen Harper visited the area, and announced the reserve's boundaries and its establishment, which was realized just over two years later, on December 16, 2014, following passage of legislation under the National Parks Act. Nááts'ihch'oh thus became the eighth National Park Reserve in the national park system. Official announcements gave no indication of when the reserve—or its neighbour, Nahanni—would gain full national park status.

== See also ==
- List of national parks of Canada
