= Lost Treasure (magazine) =

American magazine

Lost Treasure was an American magazine, found both online and in print, which described lost treasures and different methods and items used for finding them. Examples were lost mines, and valuables lost through wars, theft, or forgetfulness. The magazine was launched in 1966. It was published on a monthly basis and included tests of various metal detectors. The headquarters of the magazine was in Grove, Oklahoma. It was published by Lost Treasure, Inc.

The articles in Lost Treasure described these matters in great detail, covering money lost in the American Civil War; stagecoach and train robberies committed by famous and not-so-famous outlaws, such as Jesse James and the Wild Bunch, lost mines such as the Lost Dutchman's Gold Mine, and treasure ships lost at sea due to pirates and foul weather. The magazine also depicted the locations of various ghost towns, offering an insight into history, especially that of the United States.

The magazine used a combination of photos and drawings to illustrate the articles, such as pictures of ships, stagecoaches, old guns such as muskets and "six-shooters," gunfights, old buildings, and animals. The animals mainly include snakes and scorpions crawling about in or on boxes and chests. Some chests were damaged by theft and/or by the elements, exposing their contents, often gold, silver coins and/or jewels, and gold and/or silver ingots. Other pictures include outlaws, pirates, and "lawmen," such as Wyatt Earp and Bat Masterson. The illustrations were usually done in pencil or charcoal, and some were copies of oil or watercolor illustrations.

Famous people depicted included Pancho Villa and William Quantrill, alleged to have cached various loot and treasures.

In some old houses the windowsills and the walls often concealed treasures, including historical relics, such as period newspapers and comic books, as well as money. It was expected that the treasure hunter, called a TH'er, respect people and property, and this was also strongly stated in the magazine. The December 2018 issue was the final issue.

== See also ==
- List of missing treasure
