= Lost Lemon Mine =

Legendary lost mine in Alberta, Canada

The Lost Lemon Mine is a legendary lost mine said to be located in the southwest of the Canadian province of Alberta. The legend alleges a rich gold mine was discovered in the winter of 1870 by two prospectors named Lemon and Blackjack. Following an argument, Lemon killed Blackjack and left the next day for Tobacco Plains, Montana to wait out the winter weather. Lemon was never able to find the mine again.

The story first appeared in the 1946 edition of the Alberta Folklore Quarterly and later in magazines such as Canada West. Historian Hugh Dempsey investigated the historical evidence in his book The Lost Lemon Mine: The Greatest Mystery of the Canadian Rockies. The Lost Lemon Mine has also been featured in the television documentary series Northern Mysteries and worked into the plot of The Final Sacrifice. Some people allegedly have lost their lives while searching for the mine.
