= Planchas de Plata, Sonora =

Silver mining district in Mexico

Coordinates: 30°53′N 107°34′W

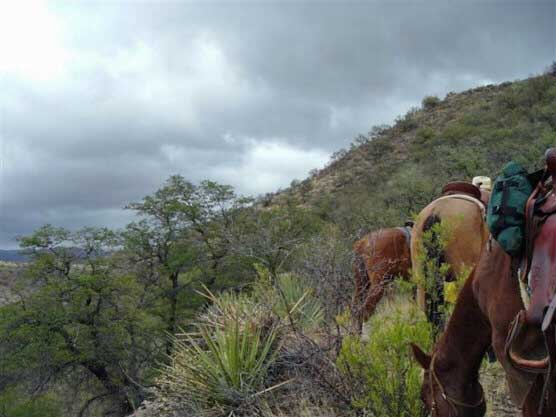
In the high country of northern Sonora, between the old Rancho Arizona and the Planchas de Plata.

Planchas de Plata (Spanish for slabs of silver), sometimes called Bolas de Plata (balls of silver) is a historic silver-mining district near Nogales, Sonora, Mexico, and a few miles south of the border with the US state of Arizona. Native silver was discovered here in 1736 by Antonio Siraumea, a Yaqui Native, on the Rancho Arizona of Bernardo de Urrea. Historian Donald Garate believes Urrea's Arizona Ranch to be the likely source of the name of the present US state of Arizona, and he claimed the origin of the name of the ranch was the Basque phrase "aritz ona" (good oak). Other historians have, however, debated this. For more detail on the etymology of the name Arizona, see Arizona.

Toward the end of last October, between the Guevavi Mission and the ranchería called Arizona, some balls and slabs of silver were discovered, one of which weighed more than one hundred arrobas (2,500 pounds), a sample of which I am sending to you, Most Illustrious Lord. --Captain Juan Bautista de Anza to Bishop Benito Crespo, January 7, 1737.

Prospectors and miners rushed to the area of the great silver discovery of October, 1736. It was given the name San Antonio de Padua by Justicia Mayor Juan Bautista de Anza when he arrived on the scene in November and ordered that all the silver that had been taken from the site be impounded and brought to Urrea's Arizona Ranch, some fifteen miles down the canyon.

Because the large pieces of silver were found in a placer deposit (unusual for silver, and unique for such large masses) the Spanish colonial government maintained that the silver was an artificial treasure trove and so belonged to the crown. The miners maintained that it was a natural placer deposit that belonged to the discoverers under Spanish law. The court case dragged on for years, and in the meantime, Spanish soldiers ejected the miners.

Because his escribano (scribe), Manuel José de Sosa, dated all the impounding documents at Arizona, people in faraway places like Guadalajara and Mexico City were soon referring to the silver as the "silver of Arizona." Arizona became a household word in early 18th century Mexico, associated with great and sudden wealth.

Some modern writers on lost mines have assumed Planchas de Plata to be "lost," although the location has always been well known.

After the initial placer silver discovery, the district was idle until silver veins were discovered in the vicinity, and between 1872 and the 1930s, at least six mines operated, and ore was treated by a stamp mill and pan amalgamation. The amount of silver produced is not known, although the amount of ore mined has been estimated as between 50,000 and 100,000 tons. No mining has been done since the 1930s, but a Canadian firm has had some encouraging results from exploration drilling in 2007.

== References and further reading ==
This article incorporates text from Arizona / Planchas de Plata, a public domain article produced by the US National Park Service.
