= Lost Dutch Oven Mine =

Lost mine legend in California, United States

The Lost Dutch Oven mine is one of the most famous lost mines in California, United States. There are several versions of the story, as is the case with most lost mine legends; perhaps the best known is the one with Tom Schofield, a railroad worker, decided to do some prospecting in his time off. According to this version, while prospecting in the Clipper Mountains, northwest of Essex (in San Bernardino county), he found an old stone house. As the house appeared to be long abandoned, he continued on. Several miles further in his travels he found a spring. Near the spring he spotted an old trail. Following the trail, it led him up over a hill where he spotted a huge boulder that was split in two. The path went through this split boulder, and into what he believed was an ancient Spanish camp.

While looking through the deserted camp, he found pieces of ore and an old rusted Dutch oven, the latter of which he tripped over in his search. As he tripped, he caused the Dutch oven to tip, spilling out handfuls of gold nuggets. Schofield filled his pockets with as much gold as he could carry and went back to "civilization" where he celebrated his good fortune in the old-fashioned way.

The upshot of the story is, Schofield, on having celebrated up all of his gold, returned to the Clipper mountains to get more gold and could not find the mine again. He could not even find the trail. Others have sought this mine unsuccessfully over the years, as Schofield gave enough details in the topography that it seems as if it would be easy to find it again.
