= Tayopa =

Tayopa is the name of a legendary lost silver mine in the Sierra Mountains of Mexico. Many stories, legends and myths surround it as well as articles and books describing the search for it. Folklorist J. Frank Dobie devoted part of his book "Apache Gold and Yaqui Silver" to the story of this legendary lost mine.

== See also ==
- Lost mines
