= South Nahanni River =

River in Northwest Territories, Canada

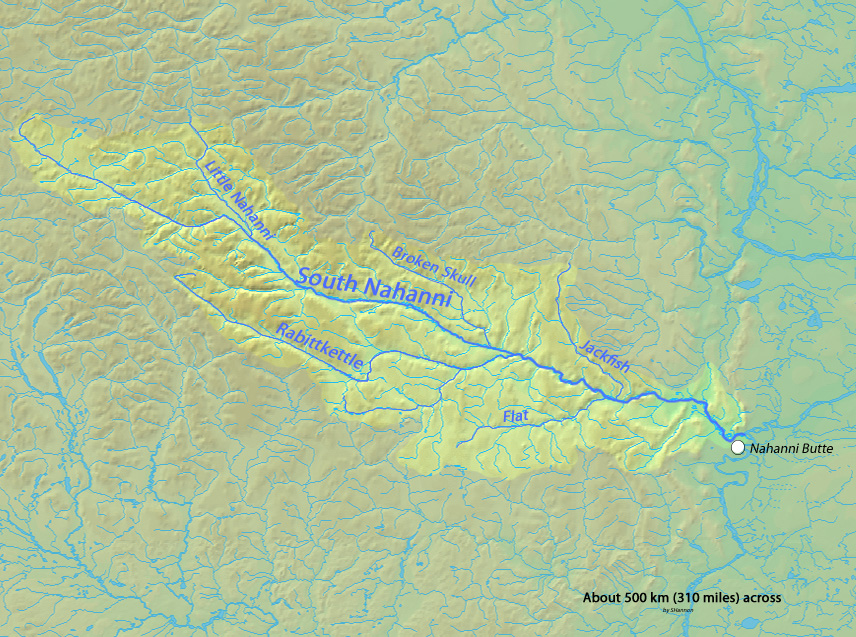
- Map of the South Nahanni River

Location
- Country: Canada
- Territories: Northwest Territories; Yukon

Physical characteristics
- Source
  - location: Selwyn Mountains
  - elevation: 1,600 m (5,200 ft)
- Mouth
  - location: Liard River
  - coordinates: 61°03′01″N 123°20′23″W
  - elevation: 350 m (1,150 ft)
- Length: 540 km (340 mi)
- Basin size: 31,100 km^{2} (12,000 sq mi)
- Discharge
  - average: 404 m^{3}/s (14,300 cu ft/s)

The South Nahanni River is a major tributary of the Liard River, located roughly 500 km (310 mi) west of Yellowknife in the Northwest Territories of Canada. It is the centerpiece of Nahanni National Park Reserve, which adjoins the Nááts'ihch'oh National Park Reserve. It flows from the Mackenzie Mountains in the west, through the Selwyn Mountains, growing as it heads east over the majestic Virginia Falls, and finally empties into the Liard River. The Nahanni has a unique geological history. It was formed when the area was a broad flat plain, forming a winding course typical of flatland rivers. As the mountains lifted, the river cut four deep canyons into the rock, maintaining its eccentric course.

The Dene and their ancestors have lived and hunted in the Nahanni area for thousands of years. In the early 19th century, the first Europeans came to the area, seeking fur and gold; however, it wasn't until the 1950s, with the publishing of Dangerous River by Raymond M. Patterson that the legends about the region were put to rest and the river finally came to prominence. Since that time, the Nahanni has become one of the prime wilderness rivers in Canada, frequented as a whitewater destination by adventure seekers around the world.

== Course ==
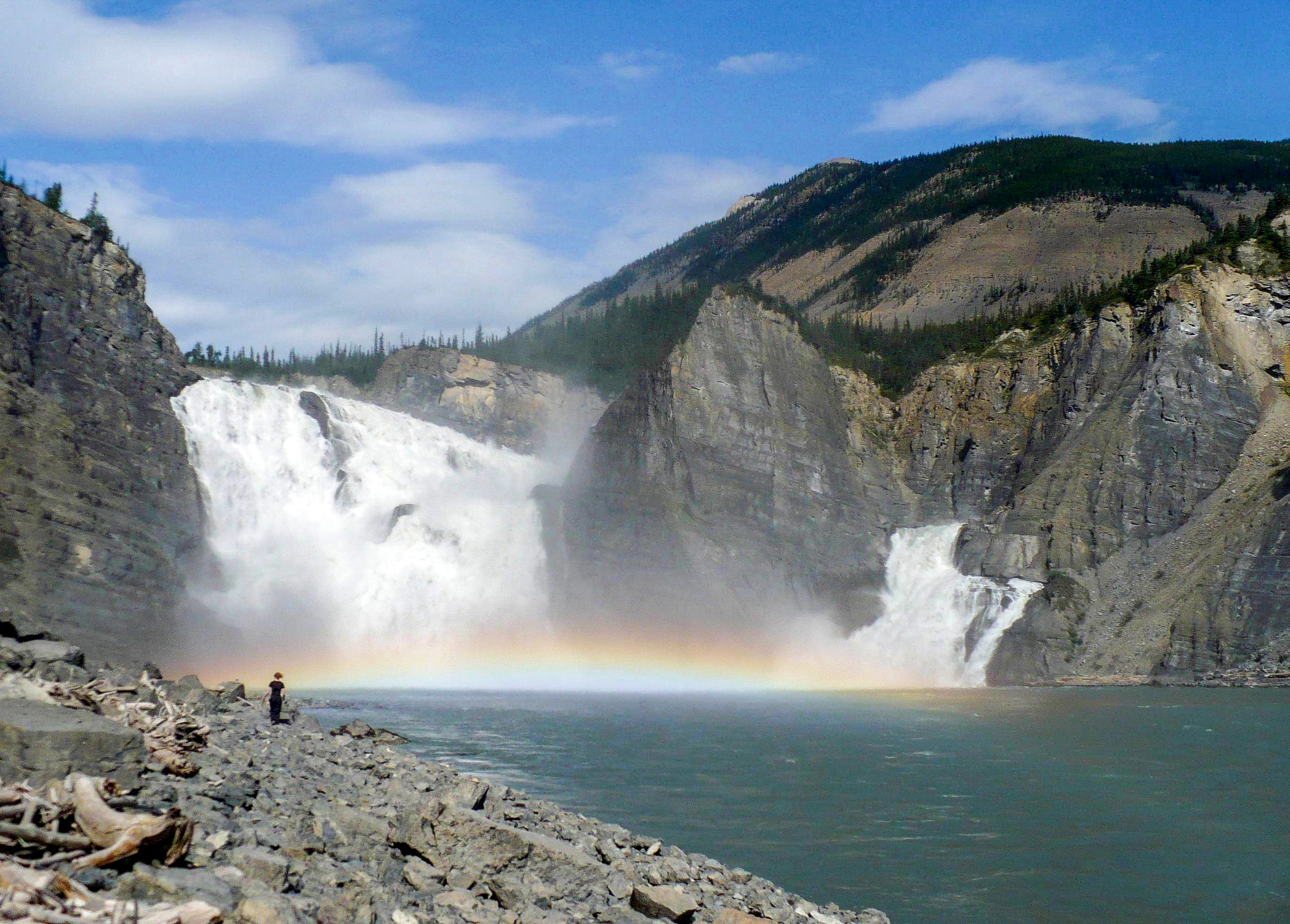
Virginia Falls

The South Nahanni River originates on the western slopes of Mount Christie of the Mackenzie Mountains, at an elevation of 1,600 m (5,200 ft). It flows south on the Yukon – Northwest Territories border for 10 km (6.2 mi), then turns south-east into the Northwest Territories at the Moose Ponds. It flows through the Selwyn Mountains, where it receives the waters of the Little Nahanni River, south of the Sapper Range.

East of the Bologna Ridge it turns west, then again south-east. It receives the waters of the Broken Skull River east of the Vampire Peaks Range, then the waters of the Rabbitkettle River and Hole in the Wall Creek as it enters the Nahanni National Park Reserve. The river crosses the entire length of the park reserve, and the confluence with the Flat River is also located here. At the eastern limit of the national park it passes between the Liard Range and the Twisted Mountain, where it receives the Jackfish River, then continues in a meandered flow and empties into the Liard River at Nahanni Butte, 90 km (56 mi) north of Fort Liard, at an elevation of 180 m (590 ft). The South Nahanni River has been proven to run 563 km (350 mi).

== Tributaries ==
From headwaters to mouth, the South Nahanni River receives waters from the following tributaries:

Tributary	Location	Remarks
The Moose Ponds	62°54′52″N 129°40′14″W	right tributary
Little Nahanni River	62°28′38″N 128°37′39″W	right tributary
Bologna Creek	62°20′45″N 128°13′00″W	right tributary
Island Lake	62°20′26″N 128°09′22″W	left tributary
Broken Skull River	62°15′50″N 127°38′41″W	left tributary
Brintnell Creek	62°03′06″N 127°21′31″W	right tributary
Rabbitkettle River	61°57′09″N 127°09′40″W	right tributary
Hell Roaring Creek	61°52′26″N 126°37′47″W	left tributary
Flood Creek	61°51′47″N 126°23′21″W	left tributary
Marengo Creek	61°35′33″N 125°38′11″W	right tributary
Flat River	61°32′00″N 125°20′50″W	right tributary
Windy Creek	61°14′54″N 123°59′34″W	right tributary
Fishtrap Creek	61°14′18″N 123°41′39″W	left tributary
Jackfish River	61°08′52″N 123°39′53″W	right tributary
Overflow Creek	61°08′44″N 123°39′22″W	left tributary
Mattson Creek	61°04′35″N 123°35′25″W	right tributary
Beaver Water Creek	61°00′24″N 123°30′38″W	right tributary
Bluefish Creek	61°02′15″N 123°25′54″W	left tributary

== Geography and geology ==
The history of the area began 550 million years ago beneath a tropical sea. Here a sedimentary layer of sandstone and limestone formed from the powerful pressure exerted by the sea. Eventually this sea dried up, forming a wide plain upon which the Nahanni River first took its course.

The Nahanni is unique amongst mountainous rivers. It formed long before the mountains ever existed, establishing a winding course typical of prairie rivers. As the mountains rose around it, the Nahanni maintained its course, cutting steep canyons into the land.

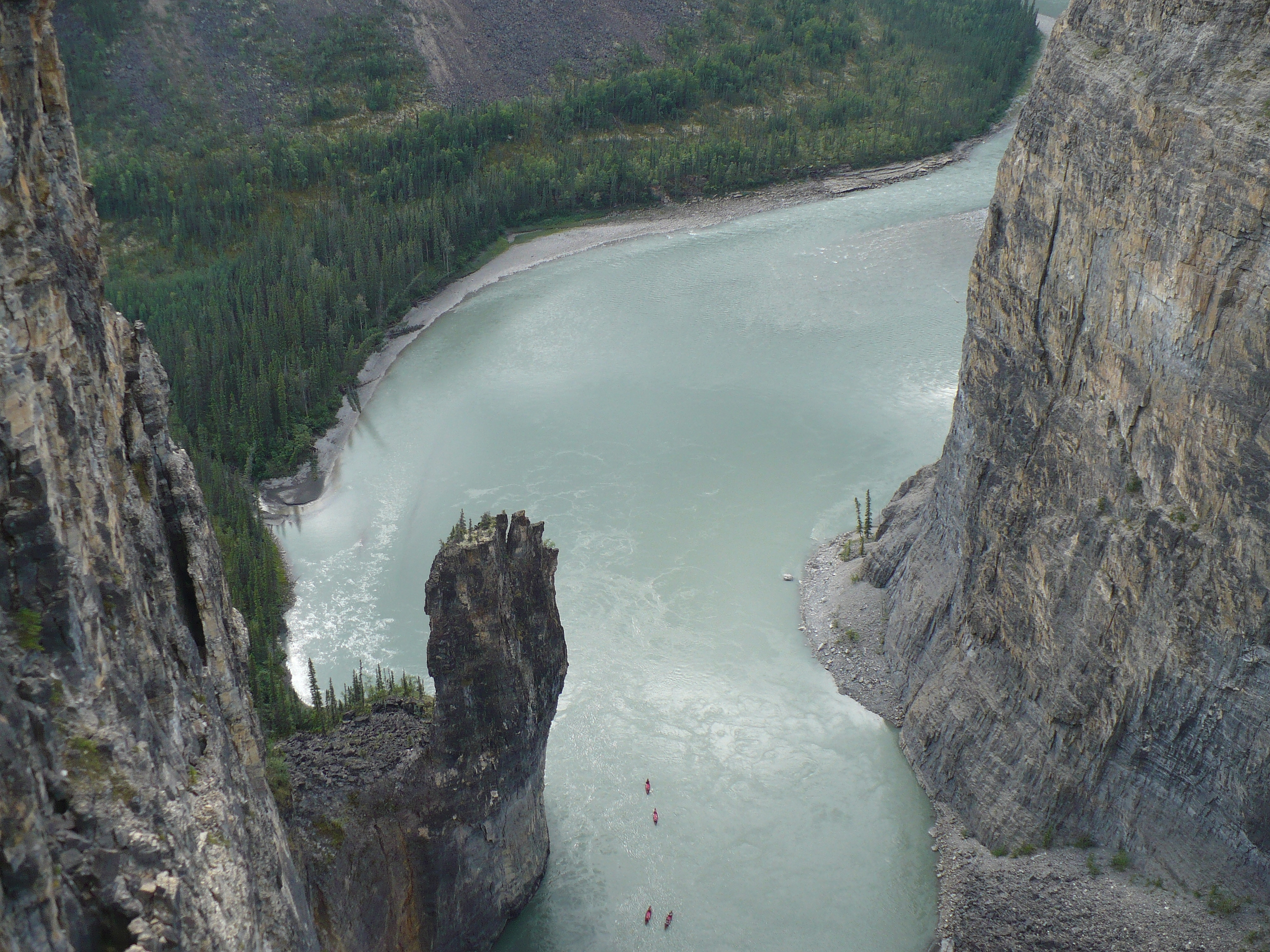
The Gate, Second Canyon

The river runs through several distinct ranges of mountains, all part of the Mackenzie Range. At its head waters, it runs through the much more rugged Selwyn Mountains, formed from the colliding North American and Pacific plates roughly 200 million years ago. As the river travels east, it transitions into a gentler terrain of rolling sedimentary mountains formed around the same time by batholiths pushing the sedimentary layers upward, and forming large granite intrusions. Finally, the Nahanni River empties into the plains of the Liard River, unaffected by the powerful forces nearby.

During the Wisconsin glaciation, or last glaciation, two ice sheets advanced along the Nahanni. The Cordilleran ice sheet advanced from the west, and the Laurentide ice sheet from the east. The middle portions of the river managed to escape glaciation entirely, and so feature some of the oldest undisturbed landscape in Canada.

Although it escaped the powerful scouring effects of the glaciers, the middle section of the river was not entirely unaffected. The Laurentide Ice Sheet blocked off the mouth of the river, and so the river valley filled up, twice forming the large glacial lake Nahanni, and once forming the smaller Glacial Lake Tetcella. This had a profound effect on the river's most famous feature, Virginia Falls.

The current course of the Nahanni River around Virginia Falls was originally blocked by a spur of the nearby Sunblood Mountain. Sometime during the Illinoian Stage (352,000 to 132,000 years ago), a glacier severed the spur, and the river took its present course, cutting into the land and forming the Fourth Canyon. During the last glaciation, the valley was immersed by Glacial Lake Nahanni, and heavy silting from the glacial water filled in the course once again, shifting the falls to their present location.

Further downstream, the First, Second, and Third Canyons were also unaffected by the direct power of glaciation. The canyons of the Nahanni River are somewhat unusual as a result. Usually when a river erodes the land, forming a valley, the valley takes the form of a V shape. The effect of glaciers on these V-shaped valleys is unmistakable, leaving a steeper U-shaped valley. Because the Nahanni's course was already established before the mountains rose, it formed steep canyon wall that plummet hundreds of feet to the river's edge. Relatively untouched by glaciation, these canyons continue in their ancient state.

== History ==
The South Nahanni River was inhabited by Dene at the time of first European contact. In early 1823, Alexander Roderick McLeod of the Hudson's Bay Company explored the lower river. The Company quickly lost interest when they realized that the river did not support a large native population and was not a viable route to the west. The nearest Hudson Bay fort was established at Fort Liard, and later many Indigenous peoples, mainly First Nations from the Nahanni settled nearby.

With the Cassiar gold rush in the 1870s, prospectors came into the area for the first time. Famously, the MacLeod brothers were found dead along the Nahanni in 1906 after reportedly staking a rich claim along the Flat River. Later two prospectors reached the South Nahanni from the Yukon by ascending the Ross River then crossing the divide to a source of the Nahanni and descended the river searching for the lost claim. One mysteriously died and was only found by his partner years later. During the following decades several more prospectors and trappers disappeared or were found dead along the Nahanni and its tributaries, starting rumors and giving the river a reputation of being extremely dangerous. This also gave rise to several of the names along the river including Deadman Valley and Headless Valley.

The arrival of floatplanes in the mid 20th century greatly increased access to the river, and allowed it to be visited without extended back country journeys. This, and the publishing of Raymond M. Patterson's Dangerous River, made the South Nahanni an outdoor destination.

In 1964, parachutist explorer, Jean Poirel from Montreal, jumped at the Nahanni source 500 km (310 mi) north of Yellowknife, during a snow storm. Making him the first one to explore the river and coming back alive where 41 persons died trying this feat before him. Followed by his teammate Bertrand Bordet, Jean Poirel imagined the idea of going down the river with inflatable dinghies, opening the path to a new rafting sport.

During five expeditions, he was the first recorded European to see and map 250 caves, one of them (named after his daughter) the "Valerie Cave" which contains Dall sheep dating back 2,500 years.

In 1971 the British explorer Sir Ranulph Fiennes headed an expedition of eight men up the South Nahanni River as far as the Virginia Falls. It included a BBC film crew. The resulting TV programme and the book were named The Headless Valley.

In 1972, during his last expedition, Jean Poirel guided Pierre Trudeau, prime minister of Canada, who came in person to evaluate this mysterious and fascinating region. Pierre Trudeau discerned the award of The Explorers to Jean Poirel, declaring: "It required an uncommon determination to venture there and bring to our knowledge this still untouched portion of Canadian territory. In doing so, Jean Poirel linked his name to the Nahanni as the Verendrye and his sons linked his name to the Rocky Mountains."

Following his visit Trudeau declared the Nahanni a National Park for Canada.

In 1978, the park became one of the first batch of World Heritage Sites appointed by UNESCO .

The South Nahanni River was inscribed in the Canadian Heritage Rivers System in January 1987, for its natural and human heritage.

== Economy ==
The following airports are located on the South Nahanni River: Nahanni Butte Airport, Náįlįcho Water Aerodrome (formerly the Virginia Falls Water Aerodrome), and the former Nahanni Butte Water Aerodrome

== See also ==
- Nahanni: River of Forgiveness
- Nahanni (film)
- List of rivers of Yukon
- List of rivers of the Northwest Territories
- Albert Faille
- Rabbitkettle Hot Springs
