= Wheelbarrow Mine =

Mine in Idaho, United States

The lost Wheelbarrow Mine is claimed to have been located about 10 miles (16 km) from Potlatch in Latah County, Idaho. The reported location is 3,871 feet (1,179.9 meters) above sea level, at the coordinates 46.9975° N, 116.7833° W. The mine, believed to have been dug prior to 1890, was said to have produced $20,000 in gold, before a falling-out between its operators led to its abandonment. One of the operators later returned to the area to find the mine again, but was unsuccessful. In June 1939, miners with the Fitsum Mining company uncovered an abandoned mine matching the description of the Wheelbarrow mine, containing human bones, presumed to belong to the other operator.
