= Moose Ponds =

Lakes in Yukon, Canada

- Nááts’ı̨hch’oh Tué
- Location within Northwest Territories Location within Yukon Location within Canada
- Interactive map of Moose Ponds
- Location: Nááts'ihch'oh National Park Reserve; Sahtu Region, Northwest Territories
- Coordinates: 62°55′3.7″N 129°41′1.2″W
- Type: Glacial lakes
- River sources: Nahanni River
- Basin countries: Canada
- Managing agency: Parks Canada
- Surface elevation: 1,110 metres (3,640 ft)
- References: "Nááts'ı̨hch'oh Tué". Geographical Names Data Base. Natural Resources Canada.

The Moose Ponds are a series of ponds mostly within the Northwest Territories, however a small portion of the largest and westernmost of the ponds does enter the Yukon.

An expansion of the South Nahanni River, just below its headwaters, are the starting point for 50 km (31 mi) of virtually continuous Class II - Class IV whitewater in Canada. This stretch of river is known locally as the Rock Gardens.
