= Lost Padre Mine (southern California) =

- Location within California
- Location: San Emigdio Canyon, California, United States; 34.922956°N 119.177594°W
- Products: Silver
- Type: Hard rock, downwards shaft
- Greatest depth: 60 feet
- Active: circa 1824

The Lost Padre Mine is a legend about Spanish or Mexican mining activity along the "big bend" section of the San Andreas Fault during California's colonial period between 1769 and 1848.

== Disambiguation ==
There are a number of legends from former Spanish colonies around the world that refer to a Lost Padre Mine or by names similar to this. The mine referred to in this short treatise is in southern Kern County in California.

== Other names ==
The Lost Padre Mine is the most common name found in documentation however the mine is also known by other names including the Los Padres Mine, Lost Los Padres Mine, Lost Padres Mine, and the San Emigdio silver mine.

== The legend ==
Stories of lost or hidden mines have been intriguing successive generations for one and a half centuries since being popularized in 19th century newspapers such as stories featured in The Ventura Signal starting the same year the newspaper was founded in 1871.

There are multiple stories describing lost mines in southern Kern County and northern Los Angeles County. The different stories refer to different mines since there is more than one mine that falls under the umbrella of the Lost Padre Mine, be it real or imagined.

== Historical context ==
Priests from the Franciscan Order of the Catholic Church are thought to have established a number of secret mines along the San Andreas Fault zone during the period of Spanish and later Mexican rule of California. By the time California was admitted as the thirty-first State of the Union in 1850, these early mines had effectively disappeared casting doubt that they had ever existed.

Some believe priests from the Jesuit Order of the Catholic Church were exploiting mineral wealth in pre-colonial California before 1768. However, this claim is unsupported in the historical record and is discounted or debunked by scholars.

Very few stories about southern California's Lost Padre Mines can be substantiated and therefore appear to be apocryphal accounts arising from folklore. However, some have a basis in fact.

== Early prospecting ==
Spanish knowledge of the interior of California was sketchy during the first decades of coastal settlement. Much of this knowledge was learned from expeditions in search of military deserters and runaway mission neophytes.

On August 24, 1790, Commandante Felipe de Goycochea dispatched nine soldiers headed by Sergeant Jose Ignacio Olivera to search for a neophyte named Domingo who had run away from Mission San Buenaventura. The military dispatch was also ordered to search for mineral outcroppings (silver) reported to be in San Emigdio Canyon. While prospecting the troupe was attacked by Indians and two soldiers were killed.

In 1792, a Spanish naturalist, José Longinos Martínez, visited the canyon. He reported the existence of silver ore but advised mining would be too dangerous an undertaking.

== Physical evidence ==
A pioneering, fur trapper and trader from Tennessee named Ewing Young (1799–1841) found physical evidence of early mining activity in southern California in the form of abandoned smelter ovens. His party made this discovery in October 1832 which was during the latter part of the Californian mission era (1769–1836). The location of the smelter works was near the Chumash village of Tashlipun (pronounced Tash-lé-poon) located in the mouth of San Emigdio Canyon (now part of The Wildlands Conservancy Wind Wolves Preserve west of Grapevine, CA).

Hidden in the mountains above the smelting ovens were two mines that were in operation during the mission era (c. 1824). Non-mission records suggest these smelters may have been managed by Mission San Buenaventura and/or Mission Santa Barbara which were both secularized by 1836. However, there is no direct evidence indicating any of the California missions were involved in mining activity.

A different "forge or furnace" used for processing antimony ore (stibnite) was discovered at the base of the southern slopes of Antimony Peak. It was documented by the renowned geologist and mineralogist William Phipps Blake who made a thorough investigation of the site on September 21, 1853, at a place his Indian guide called "Campo de los Americanos". This discovery provided further evidence of early mining activity in the area although not mission related.

== Rediscovery ==
An elderly Native American named José el Venadero knew the location of the mines that supplied the old smelters. There are newspaper reports from 1860 describing how he led an interested party to the mines.

A mission Indian from the San Buenaventura Mission named Carlos Juan Capena also knew of the smelters and the location of the mines supplying them with ore. He described one as being an antimony mine and the other a silver mine. Like most Native Americans, Capena believed in the padres' curse that would cost him his life if he revealed the secret location of the mines.

Late in his life, Capena was persuaded to lead an expedition to the silver mine on behalf of the Hon. Angel G. Escandon (a Senator of Ventura County elected in 1874). Capena, now over eighty years of age, felt he was near the end of his life and had little to lose by revealing the location of the Franciscan mine. In August 1871, Capena led a party to the mine site where everything was found to be exactly as he had described it.

Juan Esteban Pico (1841–1901) made a concerted effort to chronicle details about this historic mine. Between 1860 and 1876, Pico recorded a series of eye-witness accounts from various Native Americans who worked at the mine and from others who visited the site. In December 1871, Pico recorded an interview with Carlos Juan Capena describing the mine. It took the form of a transcript of an oral interview given in the spoken Indian language of Mizkanaltan that was subsequently translated into Spanish. Pico was expert in translating indigenous languages into Spanish. In the interview, Carlos Juan Capena told us: "...the mine has sixty paces that one may walk into the mountain and it has ladders".

This rediscovery prompted a number of individuals to lay claim to the mine. One of them was Jonathan Trumbull Warner aka Juan Jose Warner (1807–1890) of Warner’s Ranch fame. Warner was one of the original discovers of the smelters near the mouth of San Emigdio Canyon in October 1832. All those trying to claim rightful ownership were unsuccessful.

In April/May 1884, Pico himself led an expedition to this silver mine on behalf of an Italian, Prospero Calli from Bakersfield who financed the venture. Their guide was a reluctant neophyte from the Tejon reservation named Maria Ventura. She was terrified of the curse and continually avoided or stalled in revealing what she knew. Pico wrote a detailed report describing the expedition and the mine.

It was a secret mining-operation and most of the details that have survived come from Native Americans who had worked at the mine or had visited the site after it was closed.

The year the mine was established and when it was subsequently concealed and abandoned remains unknown. However, there is clear evidence that the mine was operating in early 1824 during the widespread Chumash revolt of that year.

== Cyclic rediscovery ==
In cyclic fashion, this historic mine keeps being rediscovered and then lost again through time. Documented visits to the mine site occurred in 1837, in 1860, in August 1871, in May 1884, and possibly again in 1915 when a map surfaced in Bakersfield. Two peons, C. F. Salazar and J. A. Miklas, sold a map to ex-Sheriff J. W. Kelly and two associates for $500. It is not clear if the partners who purchased the map ever found the mine.

There is sufficient evidence to establish this was a real mine and therefore the quintessential "Lost Padre Mine" that arose from stories circulating in the mid-to-late 1800s.

The most recent rediscovery was made by Peter C. Gray on September 23, 2017, after a twelve-year search.

A request has been made for The United States Forest Service to conduct an archaeological study of the site.
