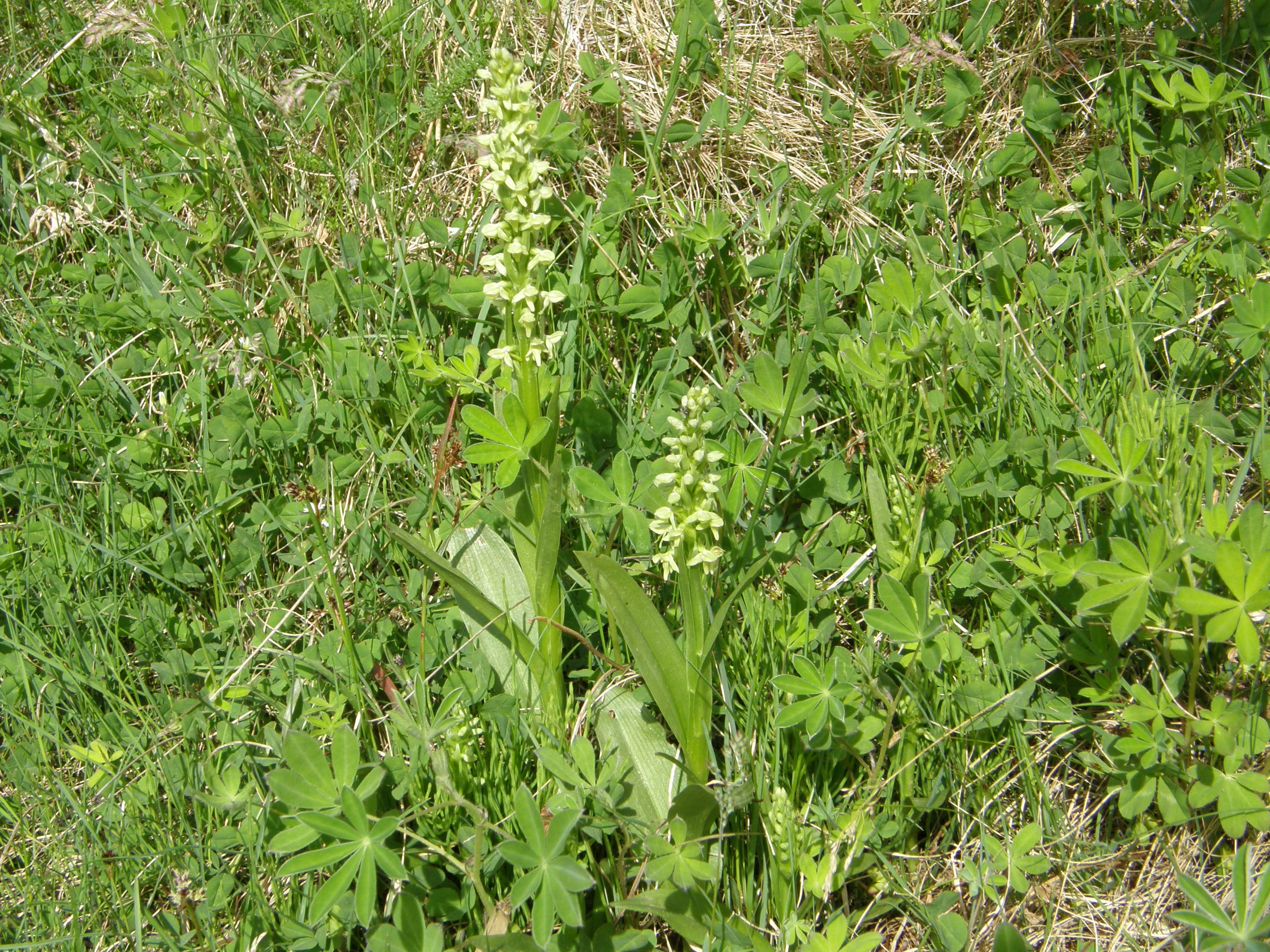
- Platanthera hyperborea in East Iceland

Scientific classification
- Kingdom: Plantae
- Clade: Embryophytes
- Clade: Tracheophytes
- Clade: Spermatophytes
- Clade: Angiosperms
- Clade: Monocots
- Order: Asparagales
- Family: Orchidaceae
- Subfamily: Orchidoideae
- Genus: Platanthera
- Species: P. hyperborea

Binomial name
- Platanthera hyperborea Lindl.

Synonyms
- Orchis hyperborea L.; Habenaria hyperborea (L.) R.Br. in W.T.Aiton; Gymnadenia hyperborea (L.) Link; Limnorchis hyperborea (L.) Rydb.; Orchis koenigii Gunnerus; Orchis acuta Banks ex Pursh; Habenaria borealis Cham.; Platanthera koenigii (Gunnerus) Lindl.; Platanthera borealis (Cham.) Rchb.f. in H.G.L.Reichenbach; Platanthera hyperborea var. minor Lange; Limnorchis borealis (Cham.) Rydb.; Limnorchis brachypetala Britton & Rydb.; Habenaria dilatata var. borealis (Cham.) Muenscher

= Platanthera hyperborea =

Northern green orchid

Species of orchid

Platanthera hyperborea, the northern green orchid, is small orchid found only in Greenland, Iceland, and Akimiski Island in Canada. Numerous authors cite the species as widespread in other parts of Canada and also in the United States; such populations are more correctly referred to as Platanthera aquilonis.
