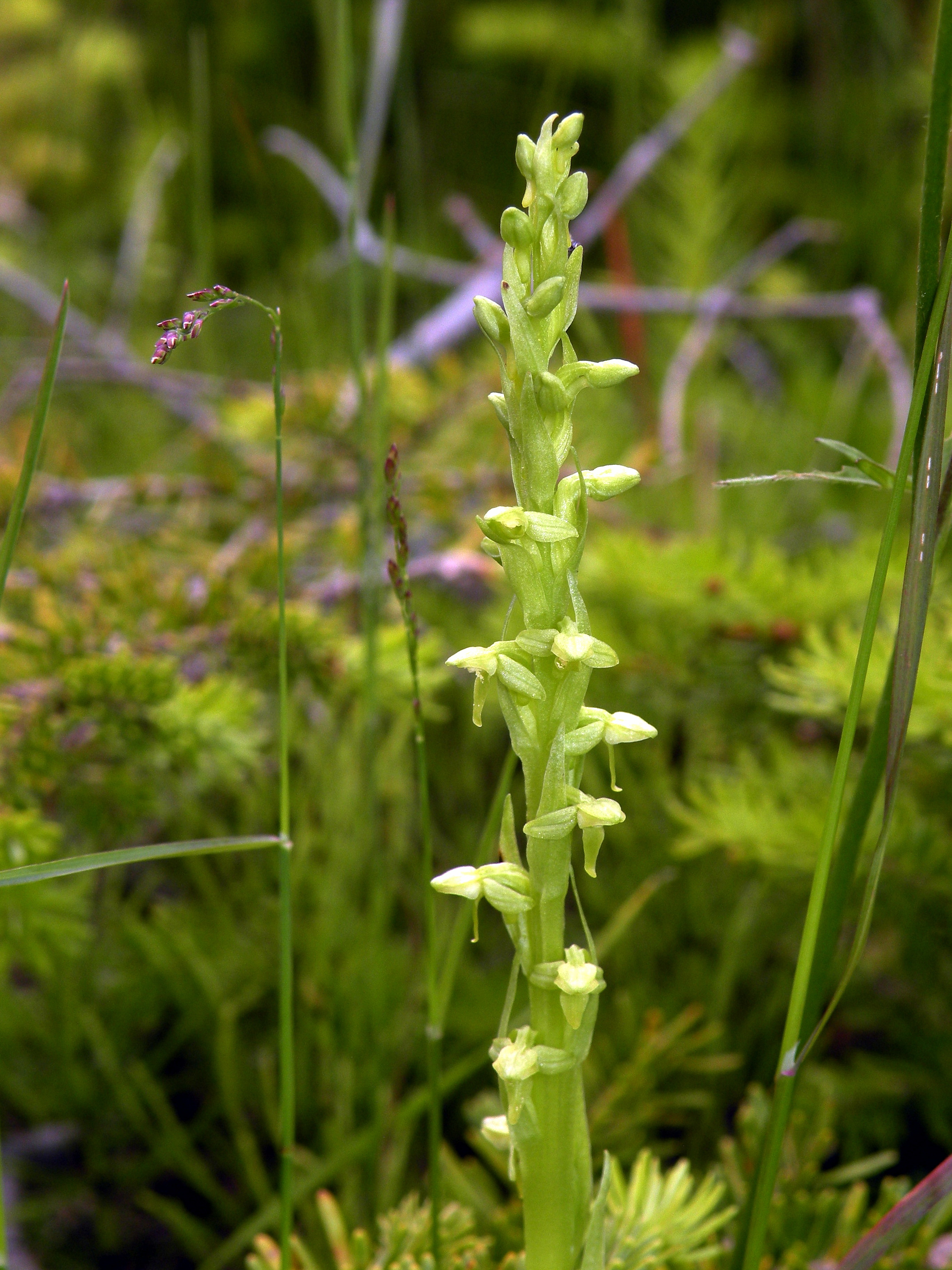

Scientific classification
- Kingdom: Plantae
- Clade: Embryophytes
- Clade: Tracheophytes
- Clade: Spermatophytes
- Clade: Angiosperms
- Clade: Monocots
- Order: Asparagales
- Family: Orchidaceae
- Subfamily: Orchidoideae
- Genus: Platanthera
- Species: P. aquilonis

Binomial name
- Platanthera aquilonis Sheviak

Synonyms
- Limnorchis aquilonis

= Platanthera aquilonis =

Species of orchid

Platanthera aquilonis, the northern green orchid or north wind bog orchid, is a species of self-fertilizing orchid native to the United States and Canada with a widespread distribution across the two countries.

== Description ==
Platanthera aquilonis is a small plant 5–60 cm in height. Flowers emerge in May and are present until August. These flowers are not showy and are generally a yellowish green color. The leaves are alternating and replaced by lenceloate bracts higher up on the stem. This orchid can be most easily identified by its forward rotated pollinia spilling over into the stigma and its rhombic to rhombic lanceolate lip. It is very similar looking to Platanthera huronensis but can be separated by the fact that Platanthera huronensis is whitish green whereas Platanthera aquilonis is just green or yellowish green in color. Platanthera aquilonis is usually scentless except in the far northwest of its range.

== Taxonomy ==
Platanthera aquilonis was scientifically described and named by Charles John Sheviak (1947-) in 1999. It is part of the genus Platanthera within the family Orchidaceae. It has no accepted botanical forms, but has one in its three synonyms.

Table of Synonyms
Name	Year	Rank	Notes
Limnorchis aquilonis (Sheviak) Rebrist. & Elven	2008	species	≡ hom.
Limnorchis aquilonis f. alba (M.H.S.Light) P.M.Br., S.L.Stewart & Gamarra	2009	form	= het.
Platanthera hyperborea f. alba M.H.S.Light	1989	form	= het.
Notes: ≡ homotypic synonym; = heterotypic synonym

== Distribution and habitat ==
Platanthera aquilonis occurs throughout much of Canada and the northern United States. But the southern extent of this species range follows the Rocky Mountains all the way into Northern New Mexico. This species can be found in a very large range of habitats including meadows, marshes, fens, the tundra, along stream banks and roadsides, as well as in wet deciduous forests. This plant can be commonly found at elevations between 0–2500 meters but has been found at elevations up to 3400 meters.

== Fungal association ==
More research is needed on the fungal associations of Platanthera aquilonis. However, limited sequencing of the fungi associated with Platanthera aquilonis has revealed that it forms relationships with fungi in the genus Tulasnella.

== Taxonomy ==
It is closely related to Platanthera huronensis and Platanthera dilatata and has long been confused with Platanthera hyperborea which lives in Greenland, Iceland, and Northern Canada, until it was described as a separate species in 1999.

== Pollination ==
Platanthera aquilionis is facultatively self fertilizing. The pollinia rotate forward above the stigma and then either are transferred directly or fall onto the stigma. It has also more recently been described that water droplets may play a large role in this process collecting pollen in the droplet and then falling and depositing the pollen onto the stigma below.

== Conservation ==
Throughout its range Platanthera aquilionis has a NatureServe ranking of G5 which denotes a secure species. But while secure throughout its range this species is locally threatened in several states and is presumed to have been extirpated from Ohio. It also has a S1 ranking denoting a critically imperiled species in Pennsylvania and S2 rankings denoting an imperiled species in both Indiana, and Arizona. The species is also considered vulnerable in Nebraska.
