= Nahanni: River of Forgiveness =

2019 film by Geoff Bowie

- Directed by: Geoff Bowie
- Written by: Geoff Bowie; Herb Norwegian
- Produced by: Michael Allder; Geoff Bowie; Gordon Henderson; Rita Kotzia
- Cinematography: Danny Patterson; Kiarash Sadigh
- Edited by: Petra Valier
- Music by: Diga; Carlos Lopes
- Production companies: 90th Parallel Film and Television Productions; Elan Productions
- Distributed by: Filmoption
- Release date: November 2019 (YIFF)
- Running time: 94 minutes
- Country: Canada
- Language: English

Nahanni: River of Forgiveness is a Canadian documentary film, directed by Geoff Bowie and released in 2019. The film centres on a 2018 project by twelve Dene people from the Northwest Territories to recreate a traditional expedition on the Nahanni River in a mooseskin canoe.

The film premiered at the 2019 Yellowknife International Film Festival, before being broadcast on the Documentary Channel in 2020.

Kiarash Sadigh received a Canadian Screen Award nomination for Best Cinematography in a Documentary at the 9th Canadian Screen Awards in 2021.
