= Albert Faille =

Canadian explorer (1887–1973)

Albert Faille (1887 – December 31, 1973) was an early pioneer, explorer, trapper and prospector of the Canadian North.

He was born in Duluth, Minnesota, in 1887. Faille spent his early years working in lumber camps, guiding tourists on canoe trips in the lake district about Duluth, and trapping fur-bearing animals in the winter months. After serving in the armed forces in World War I, he immigrated to Canada in 1927, coming directly to the South Nahanni River via the Mackenzie River and Fort Simpson. It was there that he encountered the young Raymond M. Patterson who brought him attention in his book The Dangerous River and attracted three documentaries. Though these focused on his search for gold, Faille was known as a friendly knowledgeable guide of the South Nahanni region. Faille died at his home in Fort Simpson.

== 1962 documentary ==
Faille was the subject of a 1962 short documentary, Nahanni, by the National Film Board of Canada. Directed by Donald Wilder, Nahanni follows the elderly Faille up the South Nahanni River, in search of a legendary gold mine.
