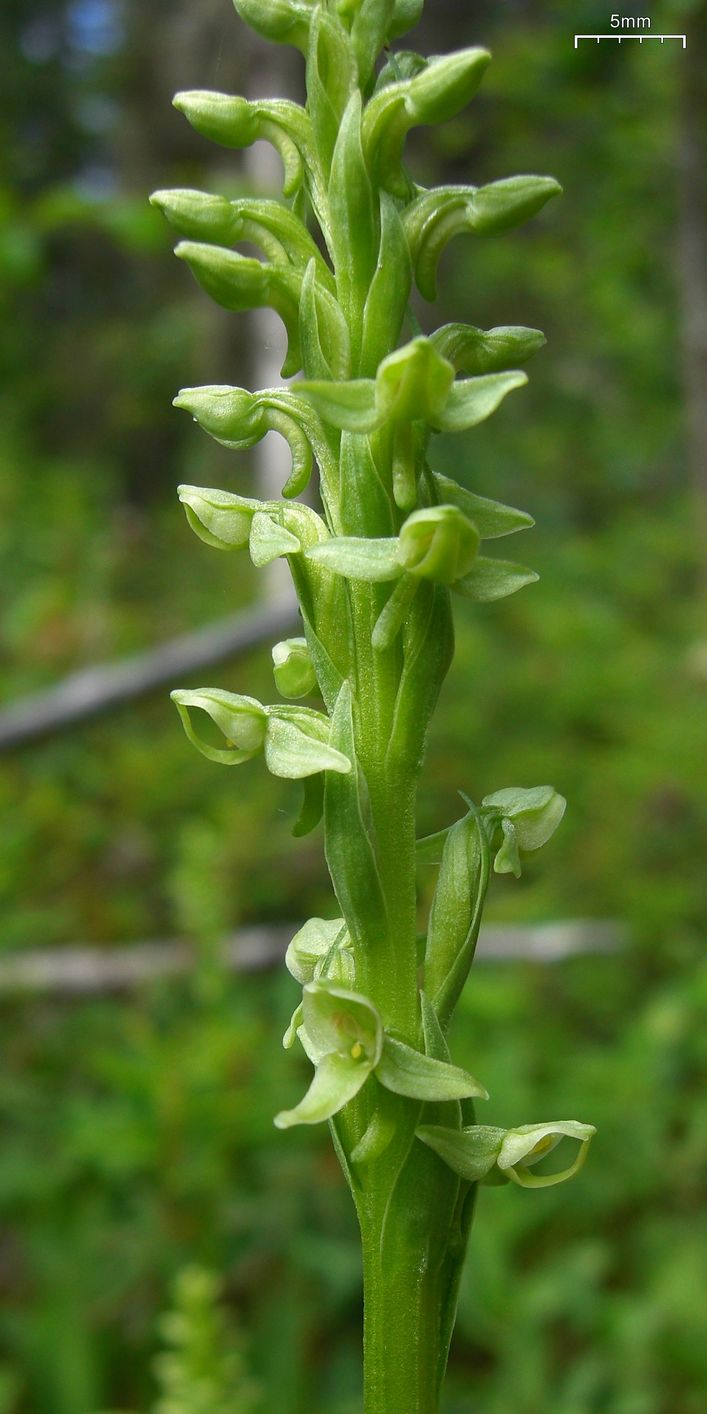
- Flower of Platanthera huronensis

Scientific classification
- Kingdom: Plantae
- Clade: Embryophytes
- Clade: Tracheophytes
- Clade: Spermatophytes
- Clade: Angiosperms
- Clade: Monocots
- Order: Asparagales
- Family: Orchidaceae
- Subfamily: Orchidoideae
- Genus: Platanthera
- Species: P. huronensis

Binomial name
- Platanthera huronensis Lindl.

Synonyms
- List: Habenaria huronensis; Habenaria media; Limnorchis huronensis; Limnorchis huronensis; Limnorchis media; Orchis huronensis; Platanthera media

= Platanthera huronensis =

North American species of orchid

Platanthera huronensis, the Huron green orchid, is a species of orchid native to the United States and Canada. It has a discontinuous range, the eastern range including eastern Canada from eastern Manitoba to Labrador, plus New England and the Great Lakes states. The western range extends along the Rocky Mountains from New Mexico to Alberta, as well as the coastal ranges of Washington, British Columbia and southern Alaska (including the Aleutians).

== Taxonomy ==
Platanthera huronensis was described and given its scientific name by John Lindley in 1835. It is classified in the family Orchidaceae together with the rest of the genus Platanthera. It has 16 heterotypic synonyms.

Table of Synonyms
| Name | Year | Rank |
|---|---|---|
| Habenaria dilatata f. chlorantha (Hultén) B.Boivin | 1967 | form |
| Habenaria dilatata var. media (Rydb.) Ames | 1908 | variety |
| Habenaria huronensis (Nutt.) Spreng. | 1826 | species |
| Habenaria hyperborea var. huronensis (Nutt.) Farw. | 1923 | variety |
| Habenaria hyperborea var. media (Rydb.) Farw. | 1923 | variety |
| Habenaria media (Rydb.) G.G.Niles | 1904 | species |
| Limnorchis huronensis (Nutt.) Rydb. | 1901 | species |
| Limnorchis huronensis (Nutt.) Rebrist. & Elven | 2008 | species |
| Limnorchis media Rydb. | 1901 | species |
| Orchis huronensis Nutt. | 1818 | species |
| Orchis hyperborea var. huronensis (Nutt.) Alph.Wood | 1853 | variety |
| Platanthera convallariifolia var. dilatatoides Hultén | 1943 | variety |
| Platanthera dilatata var. chlorantha Hultén | 1943 | variety |
| Platanthera hyperborea var. huronensis (Nutt.) Luer | 1975 | variety |
| Platanthera hyperborea var. major Lange | 1880 | variety |
| Platanthera media (Rydb.) Luer | 1975 | species |
