= Virginia Falls (Northwest Territories) =

Waterfall on the South Nahanni River in Canada

- Nailicho (Slavey)
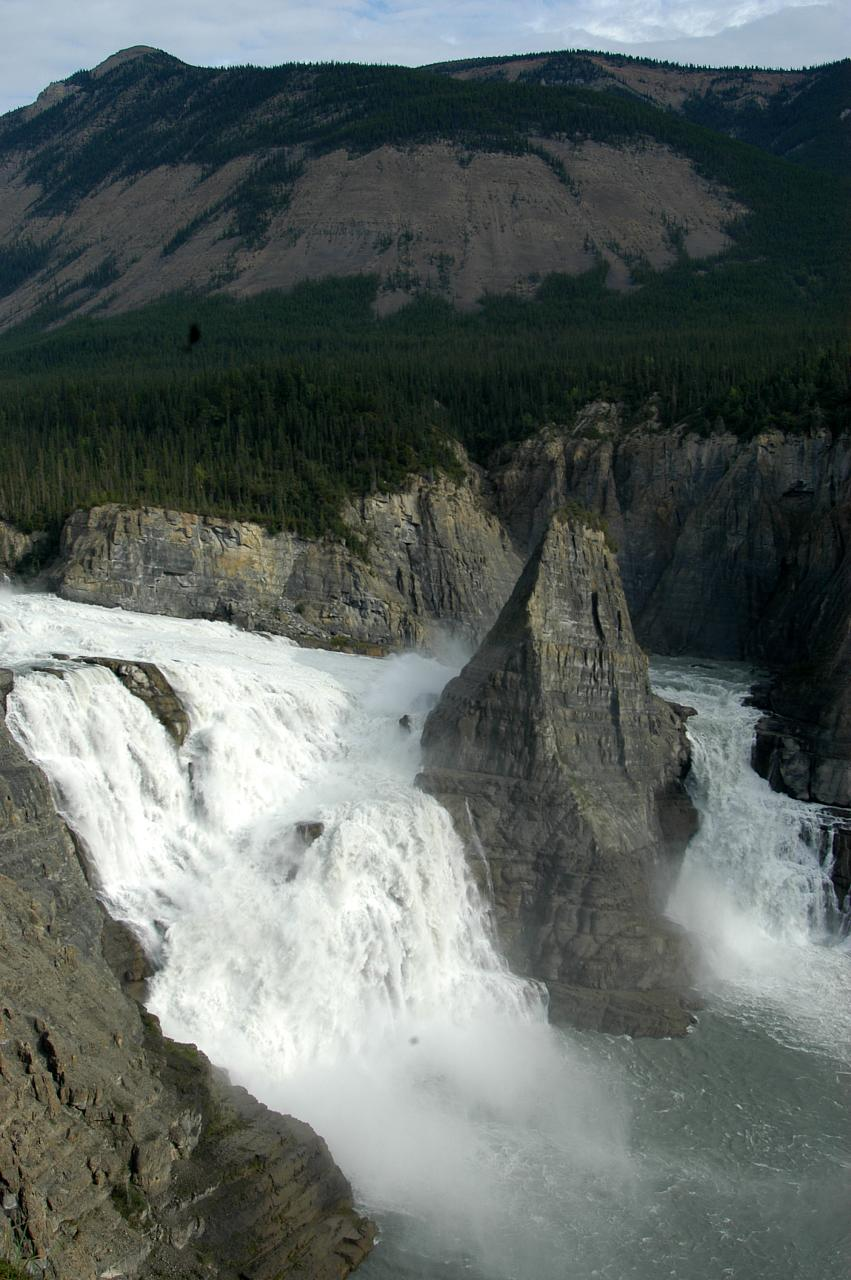

- Location within Canada
- Location: Nahanni National Park Reserve, Northwest Territories, Canada
- Coordinates: 61°36′26″N 125°44′12″W
- Type: Segmented
- Elevation: 500 m (1,600 ft)
- Total height: 96 m (315 ft)
- Number of drops: 1
- Average width: 259 m (850 ft)
- Watercourse: South Nahanni River
- Average flow rate: 1,000 m^{3}/s (35,000 cu ft/s)
- World height ranking: 860

Virginia Falls is a waterfall in Nahanni National Park Reserve, Northwest Territories, Canada. It is on the South Nahanni River, at an elevation of 500 m (1,600 ft). It is located 120 km (75 mi) from the Yukon border.

An American adventurer and businessman from Long Island, New York, named Fenley Hunter, under the employ of the Geological Survey of Canada, explored the region during the summer of 1928 and named the waterfall after his daughter.

It has a total drop of 96 m (315 ft), making it about twice the height of Niagara Falls. It consists of a single drop with an average width of 259 m (850 ft). The rock in the centre of the falls is called Mason's Rock, named after Bill Mason, a Canadian canoeist, author, and filmmaker.

The Virginia Falls Water Aerodrome is close by.

== Gallery ==
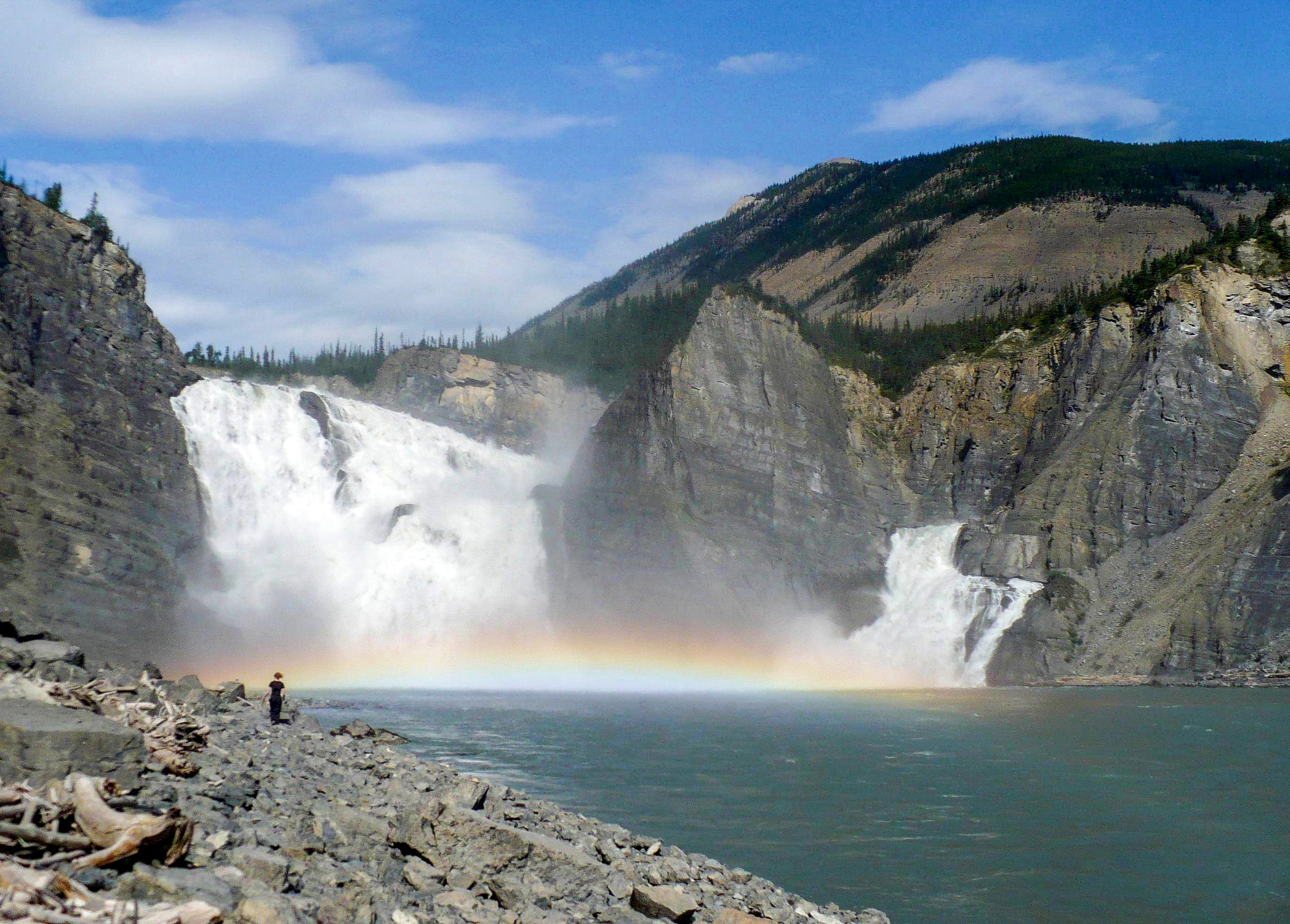
View of the falls from below.

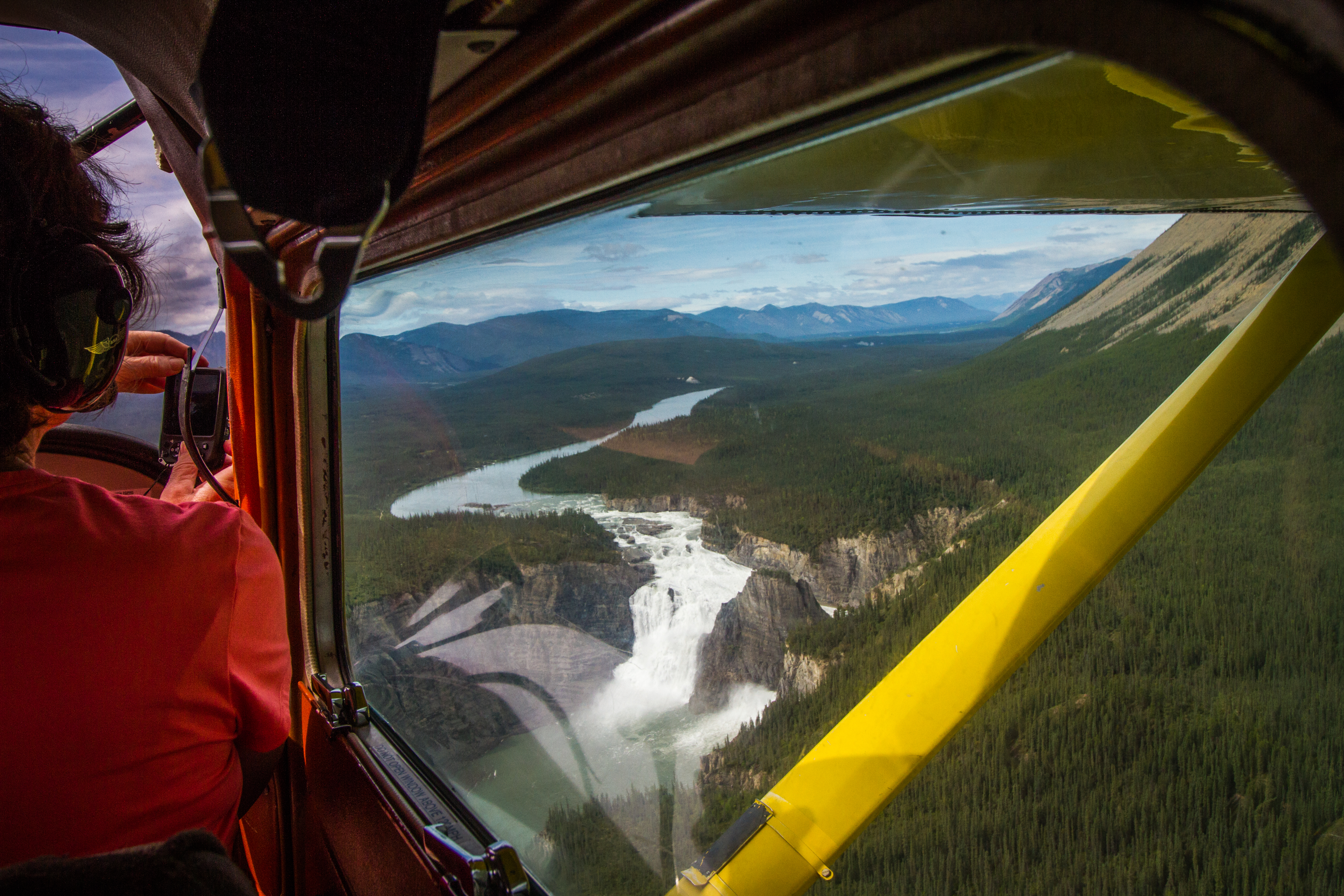
View of the falls from above.

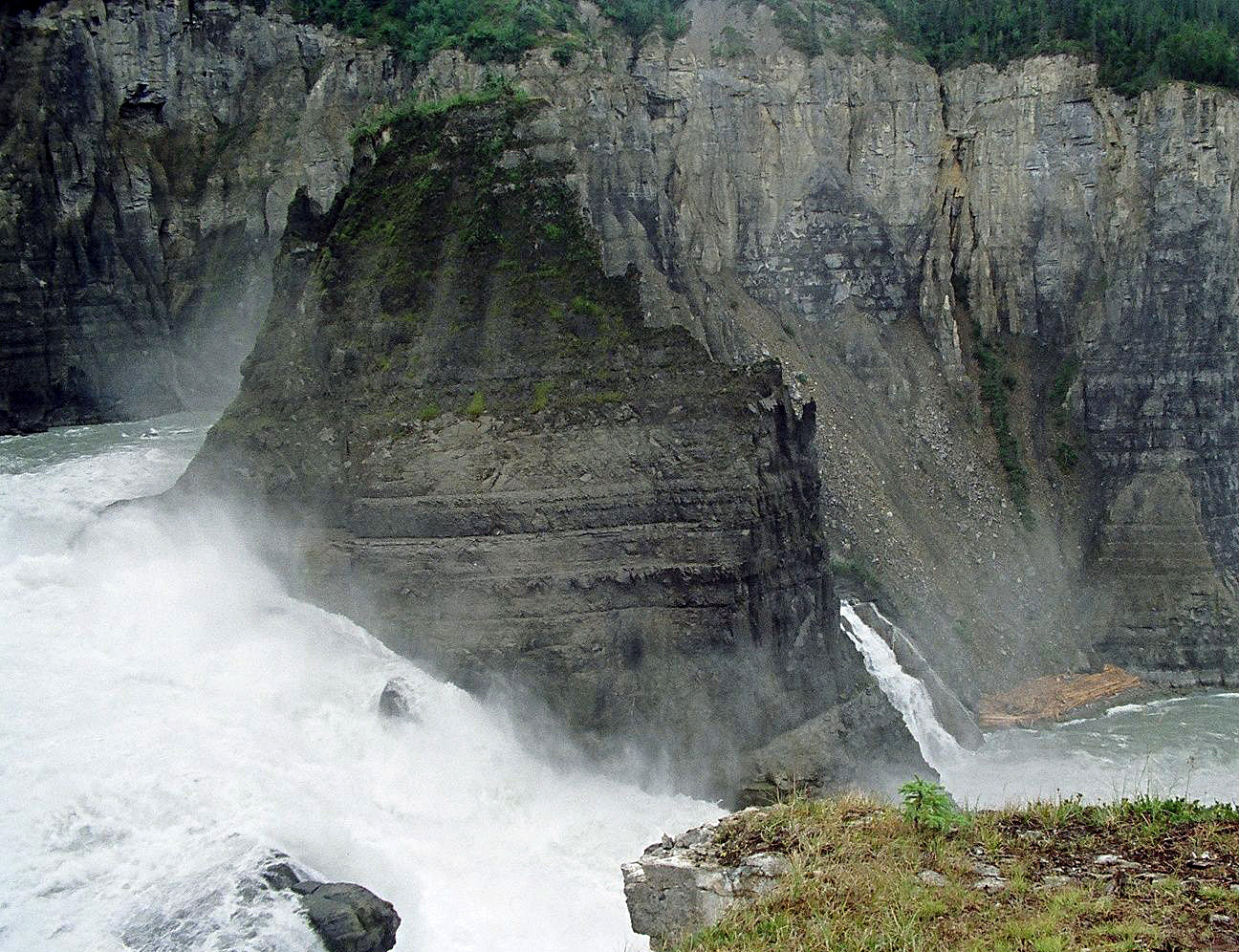
Mason's Rock

== See also ==
- List of waterfalls
- List of waterfalls by flow rate
- List of waterfalls of the Northwest Territories
