= Beaver (disambiguation) =

The beaver is a large semiaquatic rodent.

Beaver or The Beaver may also refer to:

== Arts, entertainment and media ==
=== Fictional characters ===
- Beaver Cleaver, in the Leave It to Beaver TV series (1957–1963)
- Cassidy "Beaver" Casablancas, in Veronica Mars, a 2000s teen drama TV series
- Beaver, in the Franklin preschool franchise
- Tony Beaver, in American folklore
- Mr. and Mrs. Beaver, in Narnia, a 1950 fantasy world created by C. S. Lewis
- Goodman Beaver, in 1950s/1960s comics by Harvey Kurtzman

=== Films ===
- The Beaver (film), a 2011 dark comedy
- Beavers (film), a 1988 IMAX documentary
- The Beaver Trilogy, a 2001 documentary

=== Periodicals ===
- The Beaver (newspaper), the London School of Economics' student newspaper
- The Beaver, now Canada's History magazine

=== Other uses in arts and entertainment ===
- The Beaver (fable), from Aesop's fables
- The Beavers, a statue in Fredericton, New Brunswick, Canada
- Beaver (band), a stoner rock band from the Netherlands
- The Beaver, the name of the Canadian Comedy Awards trophy
- Beaver, an optional gambling rule in backgammon
- "Beavers", a Series B episode of the television series QI (2004)

== Businesses ==
- Beaver Motorcoach Corporation, a defunct American bus manufacturer

== Education ==
- Beaver College, now Arcadia University, Glenside, Pennsylvania, U.S.
- Beaver Country Day School, Chestnut Hill, Massachusetts, U.S.
- Beaver Local High School, St. Clair Township, Ohio, U.S.
- Beavers (Scouting), programme for children aged 5 to 8

== People ==
- Beaver (surname), including a list of people with the name
- Beavers (surname), including a list of people with the name
- Beaver (singer) (Beverley Jean Morrison, 1950–2010), a New Zealand jazz singer
- Dane-zaa, historically known as the Beaver tribe, a First Nations people in Canada
  - Beaver First Nation, or the Beavers, a Canadian First Nation government or band
  - Dane-zaa language, once known as Beaver
- Beaver Harris (William Godvin Harris, 1936–1991), an American jazz drummer
- Steve Menzies (b. 1973), nicknamed Beaver, an Australian rugby league footballer

== Places ==
=== Antarctica ===
- Beaver Glacier (Enderby Land)
- Beaver Glacier (Ross Ice Shelf)

=== Canada ===
- Beaver County, Alberta
- Beaver Cove (British Columbia)
- Beaver Lakes (Annapolis), two lakes
- Beaver Mountain (British Columbia), Selkirk Mountains
- Beaver Valley (Ontario)

=== United States ===
- Beaver, Alaska
- Beaver, Arkansas
- Beaver City, Indiana
- Beaver, Iowa
- Beaver, Kansas
- Beaver, Kentucky
- Beaver, Beaver Township, Bay County, Michigan
- Beaver, Baldwin Township, Delta County, Michigan
- Beaver, Minnesota
- Beaver City, Nebraska
- Beaver, Ohio
- Beaver, Oklahoma
  - Beaver County, Oklahoma
- Beaver, Oregon
- Beaver, Pennsylvania
  - Beaver County, Pennsylvania
- Beaver, Utah
  - Beaver County, Utah
- Beaver, Washington
- Beaver, West Virginia
- Beaver, Clark County, Wisconsin
- Beaver, Marinette County, Wisconsin
  - Beaver (community), Marinette County, Wisconsin
- Beaver, Polk County, Wisconsin
- Beaver Mountain, Utah
- Beaver Mountain (Wyoming)
- Beaver National Forest, Utah
- Beaver Township (disambiguation)

== Sports ==
- Bemidji State Beavers, athletic teams of Bemidji State University, Minnesota, U.S.
- Oregon State Beavers, athletic teams of Oregon State University, U.S.
  - Benny Beaver, the mascot of Oregon State University
- Portland Beavers, baseball teams representing Portland, Oregon, U.S.
- Beaver Stadium, in University Park, Pennsylvania, U.S.
- Weyburn Beavers (disambiguation), the name of different sports teams

== Vehicles ==
=== Aircraft ===
- De Havilland Canada DHC-2 Beaver
- Spectrum Beaver, an ultralight family
- Type 93A Beaver, the Bristol Boarhound's bomber variant
- Bober (drone), a Ukrainian drone

=== Other vehicles ===
- Beaver (armored bridgelayer vehicle), a variant of the Leopard 1 tank
- Beaver (ship), the name of several ships
- Plaxton Beaver, a minibus body
- Beaver (train), a Southern Pacific passenger train
- Beaver Rover, a proposed Mars rover on the cancelled Northern Light mission

== Other uses ==
- Beaver, an alternative spelling of bevor, a piece of medieval armour protecting the neck
- Beaver, term confused with bevor to refer to the visor of a medieval military helmet
- Mountain beaver, a North American rodent not closely related to the beaver

== See also ==
- Beaver Airport (disambiguation)
- Beaver Bridge (disambiguation)
- Beaver Brook (disambiguation)
- Beaver County (disambiguation)
- Beaver City (disambiguation)
- Beaver Creek (disambiguation)
- Beaver Dam (disambiguation)
- Beaver Falls (disambiguation)
- Beaver tail (disambiguation)
- Beaver Valley (disambiguation)
- Beaverdam Creek (disambiguation)
- Beaverton (disambiguation)
- Beavertown (disambiguation)
- Beaverville (disambiguation)
- Eager beaver (disambiguation)
- Beaver v R, a notable decision of the Supreme Court of Canada
- Beaver fraternal orders
- Beaver hat, a hat made from felted beaver fur
- Beevers, a surname
- Bieber (surname)
- Belvoir (disambiguation), a homophone used for names and locations
- Busy beaver, a game in theoretical computer science
- Made beaver, a unit of account used in the Hudson's Bay Company
