= Beaver (surname) =

Beaver is a surname. Notable people with the surname include:

- Bev Beaver (1947–2025), Mohawk Canadian athlete
- Beverly Barton (1946–2011), American author born Beverly Marie Beaver
- Black Beaver (1806–1880), Delaware / Lenape chief, guide, rancher
- Bruce Beaver (1928–2004), Australian poet
- David Beaver, American linguist and philosopher
- Diane E. Beaver, American lawyer and United States Army officer
- Edmund Beaver (1911–1993) Australian rugby league footballer
- Francis Beaver (1824–1887), Australian politician
- Fred Beaver (1911–1980) American painter
- Hugh Beaver (1890–1967) British engineer and businessman
- Isidor George Beaver (1859–1934), Australian architect
- Jack A. Beaver (1918–2012), American politician
- Jack Beaver (1900–1963), British film score composer
- James A. Beaver (1837–1914), Pennsylvania governor
- Jim Beaver (born 1950), American actor
- Josh Beaver (born 1993) Australian swimmer
- Justin Beaver (born 1984), American football player
- Kevin Beaver (born 1977) American criminologist and academic
- King Beaver (d. 1769 or 1771) Lenape tribal chief
- Martin Beaver (born 1967), Canadian violinist
- Olga Beaver (1942–2012), Czech-American mathematician
- Paul Beaver (1926–1975) American musician
- Philip Beaver (1766–1813), Royal Navy officer
- R. Perry Beaver (1938–2014), American Muscogee leader
- Roger A. Beaver (born 1936), biologist who studied Nepenthes pitcher plants
- Ryan Beaver (born 1984), American singer-songwriter
- Samson Beaver (1877–1908), Canadian explorer
- Sandy Beaver (1883–1969), American football player
- Sigourney Beaver, (born 1992) American female impersonator
- Tessa Beaver (1932–2018), English painter and illustrator
- Wilfred Beaver (1897–1986), British flying ace
- William Beaver (disambiguation), several people

- William H. Beaver (1940–2024), accounting researcher and educator
- William T. Beaver (1933–2020), American medical researcher and educator

== See also ==
- Beaver (disambiguation)#Fictional characters
- Beavers (surname)
- Julian Beever (born c. 1959), British chalk artist
