= Beaver (ship) =

Numerous vessels have been named Beaver, for the beaver:

- Beaver, one of the ships involved in the Boston Tea Party in 1773
- Beaver (1793 ship) was launched on the Thames in 1793. She traded between London and Canada but in 1796 she became a whaler in the Southern whale fishery. The Spanish captured her in 1797.
- Beaver (1796 ship) was launched in 1796 at Liverpool. She made seven complete voyages as a slave ship in the triangular trade in enslaved persons. She was captured and retaken once, in 1804, and captured a second time in 1807, during her eighth voyage.
- Beaver (1805), an American merchant vessel
- Beaver (steamship), a steamship 1835–1892, important in the history of British Columbia,
- Beaver (1873 sternwheeler), a steamboat
- Beaver (tugboat), a steam tugboat in Australia launched in 1886
- Beaver (HBC vessel), see boats of the Mackenzie River watershed
- Beaver (1947 ship), see boats of the Mackenzie River watershed

== Naval vessels ==
- HMS Beaver, any one of 10 vessels
- HMCS Beaver (S10)
- USS Beaver (AS-5)

== See also ==
- Beaver (disambiguation)
- SS Beaver State (T-ACS-10)
