= List of festivals in California =

This is a list of notable festivals in California.

== Festivals ==
Festival	Location	Years active	Status	Ref.
Bay Area Science Festival	Bay Area	2011–		
Big Sur Jade Festival	Big Sur	1990–		
BeachLife Festival	Redondo Beach	2019–		
Bishop Mule Days	Bishop	1969–		
BottleRock Napa Valley	Napa, California	2013–		
California Dried Plum Festival	Yuba City	1988–		
California Festival of Beers	Avila Beach			
California Strawberry Festival	Ventura	1984–		
Citrus Festival	Santa Paula			
Castroville Artichoke Festival	Castroville			
Conucopia	Anaheim	1999–		
Coachella Valley Music and Arts Festival	Indio			
D23 Expo	Anaheim	2009–		
Disney California Adventure Food & Wine Festival	Anaheim			
Gilroy Garlic Festival	Gilroy	1979–2019	Discontinued	
Human Be-In	San Francisco	1967	Discontinued	
Japan Expo USA	San Mateo	2013–2014	Discontinued	
Lompoc Valley Flower Festival	Lompoc	1952–2019, 2022–		
Madonnari Chalk Festival	Santa Barbara			
Mushroom Mardi Gras Festival	Morgan Hill	1980–		
National Orange Show	San Bernardino	1911–		
Newport Beach Wooden Boat Festival	Newport Beach	2014–2019, 2021–		
Pasadena Chalk Festival	Pasadena	1993–		
Paso Robles Wine Festival	San Luis Obispo			
Picnic Day (UC Davis)	Davis	1909–		
Pioneer Days	Chico	1915–		
Poppy Jasper International Film Festival	Morgan Hill	2004–		
Quail Motorcycle Gathering	Carmel	2009–		
Renaissance Pleasure Faire of Southern California	Irwindale	1962–		
Ridgecrest Petroglyph Festival	Ridgecrest	2014–		
Riverside County Fair and National Date Festival	Indio	1947–		
Santa Barbara Summer Solstice Parade	Santa Barbara	1974–		
Santa Barbara Harbor & Seafood Festival	Santa Barbara	2003–		
Santa Maria Valley Strawberry Festival	Santa Maria	1990–		
Sea Otter Classic	Monterey	1991–		
Temecula Valley Balloon & Wine Festival	Temecula	1984–2019, 2022–		
Wasteland Weekend	Edwards	2010–2019, 2021–		
Whole Earth Festival	Davis			
World Ag Expo	Tulare	1968–		
World's Largest Salmon BBQ	Fort Bragg	1971–		

== See also ==
- List of festivals and fairs in the San Francisco Bay Area
