= Jade Cove =

Bay in Monterey County, California, United States

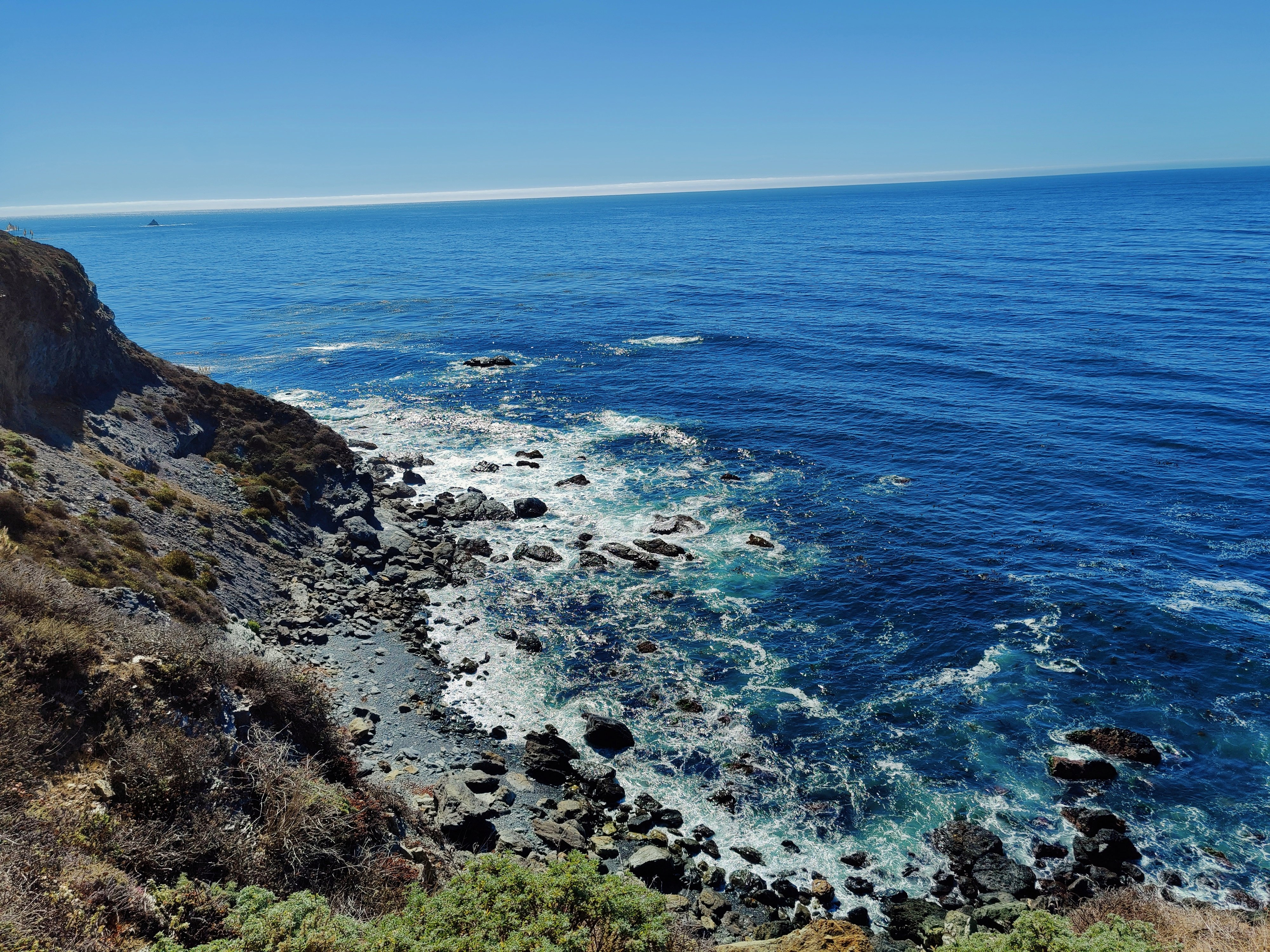
- Jade Cove in southern Monterey County

- Location within California Location within the United States
- Location: Monterey County, United States
- Nearest city: Gorda
- Coordinates: 35°55′4.5″N 121°28′54″W
- Governing body: California Department of Parks and Recreation

Jade Cove is located in the southern area of Big Sur on the California central coast. It contains the only concentrated underwater deposit of quality nephrite jade in the world. Individuals are permitted to collect as much jade as they can personally carry using hand tools up to 90 feet (27 m) deep offshore.

== Shore access ==
There is a very steep 0.1 miles (0.16 km) trail from the Plaskett Campground to Jade Cove that ends in a rope-assisted drop to the beach. The beach can be dangerous during high tides and storms. The cove is 2 miles (3.2 km) south of Sand Dollar Beach and just over 3 miles (4.8 km) north of Gorda. Shore access is open daily from sunrise to sunset and is only available for day use. Swimming and wading are not recommended due to dangerous surf conditions and strong rip currents.

== Jade collecting ==
The availability of high-quality nephrite jade spurred the start of the annual Big Sur Jade Festival in 1989. Before regulations limited how much jade could be removed, divers floated large boulders of jade to the surface.

Two different metamorphic rocks known as Nephrite and Jadeite, although composed of separate minerals, are collectively referred to as jade. They are extremely similar in appearance and were not differentiated from one another until 1863. There are large deposits of light-green serpentine that unwary collectors mistake for jade.

The Monterey Bay National Marine Sanctuary has very strict regulations governing how jade may be collected. The agency permits individuals to collect loose nephrite jade below mean high tide from an area south of Sand Dollar Beach to Cape San Martin and up to 90 feet (27 m) deep offshore. Individuals may remove only what they can individually carry. Only hand tools are permitted.

There is very little natural jade on the shore. Dangerous waves can inundate the rocky beach in certain weather. The best quality jade is only accessible to divers. They are permitted to use lift bags with a combined capacity of not more than 200 pounds. On rare occasions, waves can deposit pieces on the shore. Four kinds of jade can be found in Jade Cove: Green is the most common type. Rarer types include Vulcan, Blue, and Botryoidal (Bubble or Grape) Jade.
