= Beever =

Beever is a surname and may refer to:

- Alex Beever (born 1973), British rower
- Julian Beever (born c. 1959), British chalk artist
- Mary Beever (1802–1883), British artist and botanist
- Ross Beever (1946–2010), New Zealand geneticist and mycologist

== See also ==
- Beevers - English surname
- Beaver - an animal
