= Sidewalk chalk =

Writing implement

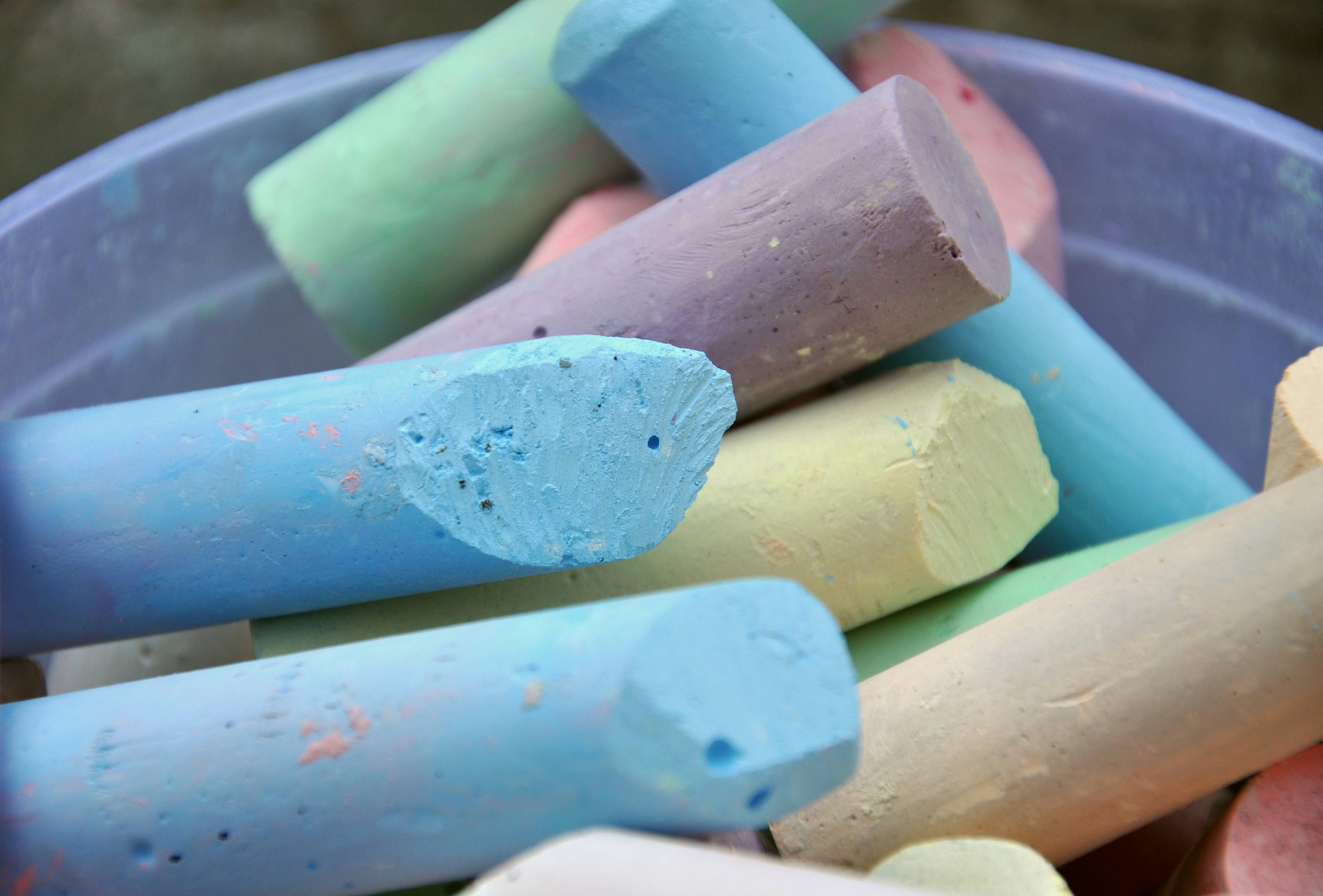
Sticks of sidewalk chalk

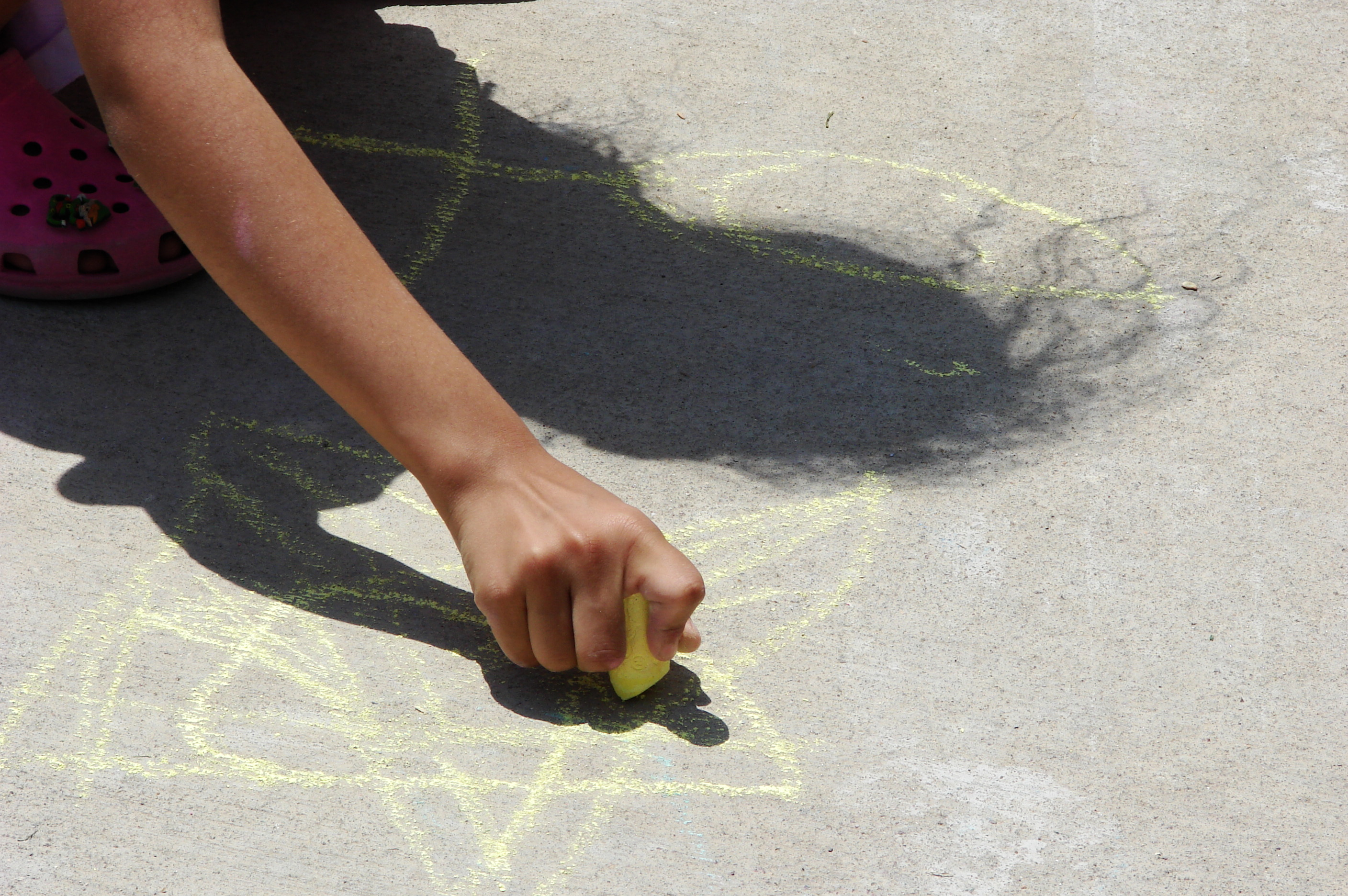
A child drawing on concrete

Sidewalk chalk is typically large and thick sticks of chalk made of calcium sulfate (gypsum), instead of calcium carbonate (rock chalk). It comes in multiple colors and is mostly used for drawing on pavement or concrete sidewalks, frequently four square courts or hopscotch boards. Blackboard chalk, typically used in educational settings, is shorter and thinner than sidewalk chalk.

There are several different types of sidewalk chalk, typically coming in solid-colored sticks. 3-D sidewalk chalk sets, where the included 3-D glasses (similar to ChromaDepth glasses) cause colors to be perceived as closer or further depending on their wavelength, also exist.

Sidewalk chalk can be homemade from water, paint and plaster of Paris.

== Use ==
Sidewalk chalk is used at some universities to advertise for events, especially where there is much concrete. Prohibitions are set for where students can chalk, usually limiting it to areas that will be washed away with rain, or areas which are set to be cleaned of chalk markings.

Some teachers promote use of sidewalk chalk on a carpet as an interactive teaching tool.

Although sidewalk chalk is created to allow people to draw on sidewalks or pavement, some law enforcement agencies may prohibit sidewalk drawing in certain areas without first being requested for authorization.

== Health Risks ==
Along with regular blackboard chalk, sidewalk chalk has minor health risks. Some brands of chalk have been known to contain high amounts of lead, leading to them being recalled. When you use any type of chalk, dust comes out into the air. But research shows that sidewalk chalk produces a significant amount more dust than blackboard chalk. When the dust gets into your lungs, it could lead to skin and respiratory disorders.

== Events ==
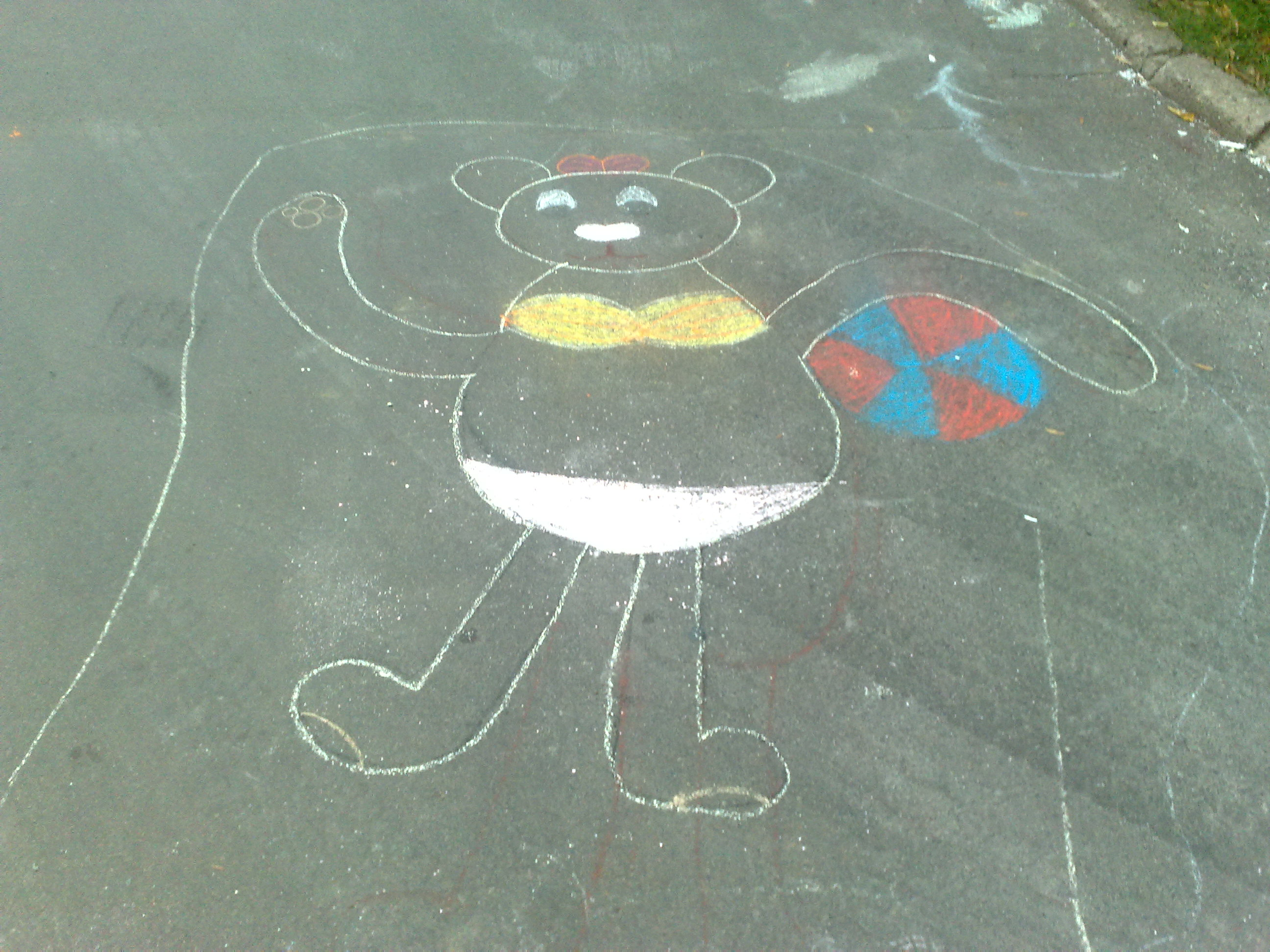
Chalk art by kids in the Czech Republic

On September 16–17, 2006, a global event was held to promote peace through sidewalk chalk drawings. Chalk4Peace was a project planned by an artist from Arlington, Virginia named John Aaron, who asked children and teens from the age of eight to age eighteen to participate in groups across the world to draw chalk drawings that would illustrate peace for one of the Chalk4Peace events. Designated areas on sidewalks, pavement, and concrete were used for the participants to draw on while volunteers took pictures of the street paintings. Aaron used his own money and donations to provide sidewalk chalk to areas of the world that he believed did not have access to good quality chalk.

There are many competitions for chalk artists, including the Pavement Art Competition in the Bold Street Festival in Liverpool in 2010.

The largest sidewalk chalk festival in the world is the Pasadena Chalk Festival, held annually in Pasadena, California. The 2010 edition involved about six hundred artists of all ages and skills and attracted more than 100,000 visitors.

== Art ==
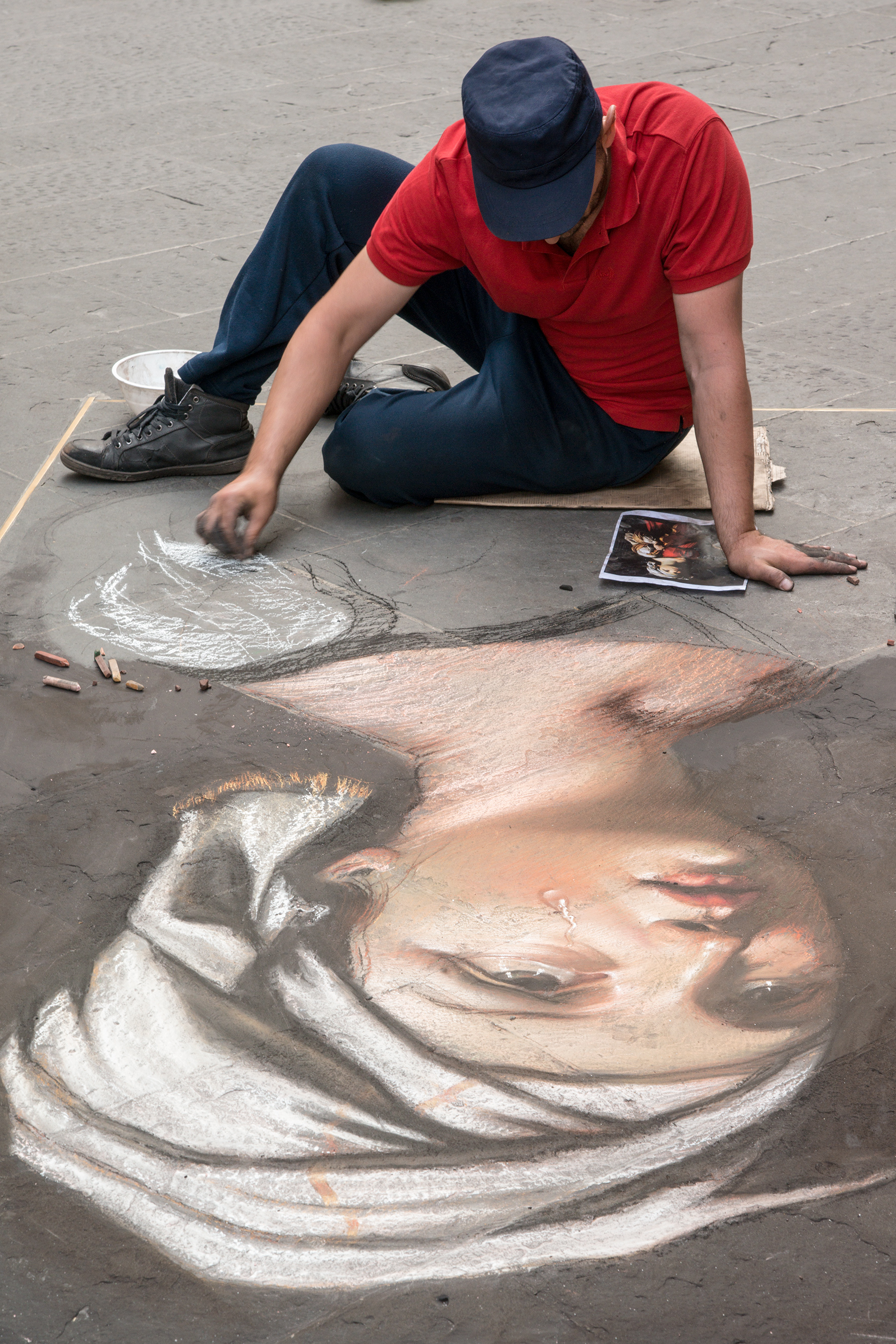
Skilled chalk artist in Florence, Italy

Child's chalk drawing

Artists such as Kurt Wenner, Ellis Gallagher and Julian Beever have created intricate and realistic street paintings using the chalk and pastels. It is typical for sidewalk chalk artists to use anamorphic drawing when drawing with sidewalk chalk. Nonanamorphic drawing are drawings that are drawn to be observed face-on, whereas anamorphic drawings are drawn to be observed from a different viewpoint. Julian Beever, in a Q&A with Adam Boretz, explained his drawing of his first anamorphic sidewalk chalk drawing, Swimming Pool:

I was drawing conventional pavement pictures—portraits of the famous, copies of old masters [before anamorphic pavement drawing]. There was one particular street in Brussels that had large rectangles of tiles set in the pavement ... I used these rectangles as frames for my drawings ... I had done this many times when one day I suddenly realized I could use these tiles as if they were the outside surround of a mini-swimming pool. All I had to do was color them and then fill in the pool inside ... I was so impressed with the result ... that I had to do more.

Sidewalk Sam was well known in the Boston area for his reproductions of European masterpieces, chalked or painted on the sidewalk.
