= LA Shorts Fest =

American film festival

Los Angeles Shorts International Film Festival (LA Shorts)
- Location: Los Angeles, California, U.S.
- Founded: 1997 (29 years ago)
- Language: International
- Website: lashortsfest.com

The LA Shorts International Film Festival (LA Shorts), founded by Robert Arentz in 1997, is one of the largest international short film festivals in the world with more than three hundred films screening annually.

In order to qualify for a short film award at the annual Academy Awards (the Oscars) one must meet the Rules and Eligibility criteria, which includes qualification through awards at qualifying festivals. LA Shorts is the only film festival with seven award categories recognized by the Academy Awards.

LA Shorts is the longest-running short-film festival in Los Angeles. The festival screens over 350 films and attracts over 10,000 attendees each year, including Hollywood industry professionals and emerging independent filmmakers.

The festival is accredited by the Academy of Motion Picture Arts and Sciences and award winners are eligible for Academy nomination. LA Shorts is also an official qualifying event for the British Academy of Film and Television Arts (BAFTA) short film awards. and the Academy of Canadian Cinema and Television (ACCT) presenters of the Canadian Screen Awards – eligible international film festivals. An official qualifying film festival by The Academy of Motion Picture Arts and Sciences of Spain Goya Awards.

LA Shorts alumni directors include Tim Burton, Bryan Singer, Paul Haggis, Shane Black, Jason Reitman, John Woo, Tony Scott, David Lynch, Joe Carnahan, Louis D'Esposito, Terry Gilliam, Jon Favreau, Scarlett Johansson, Vin Diesel, Hilary Swank, Demi Moore, Courteney Cox, Jessica Biel, Kirsten Dunst, Luke Wilson, Ralph Macchio, Ricky Gervais and many more.

In 2023, the festival celebrated its 27th annual year with over 500 screened films.

The Los Angeles Shorts International Film Festival is held annually at L.A. Live in downtown Los Angeles. The official screening venue is Regal Cinemas L.A. LIVE Stadium 14.

== Prestige ==
In 2010, MovieMaker magazine reported that a total of 33 LA Shorts Fest winners had earned Academy Award nominations, with eleven filmmakers taking home the Oscar.

According to Film Festival Life, LA Shorts Fest is the only film festival with seven award categories recognized by the Academy Awards. It has reported that a total of forty-four LA Shorts Fest winners have progressed through to become Academy Award nominees, with fourteen filmmakers winning an Oscar.

== Honorees ==
The festival has honored Charles Chaplin, Harold Lloyd, and Robert Wise.

== See also ==
- List of festivals in California
- List of film festivals
