= Big Sur Jade Festival =

Coordinates: 35.91872°N 121.46705°W

The Big Sur Jade Festival is an annual three-day event held in southern Big Sur in Monterey County, California. It is organized by the non-profit South Coast Community Land Trust.

The availability of high-quality nephrite jade at Jade Cove spurred the start of the annual festival in 1989. Before regulations limited how much jade could be removed, divers floated large boulders of jade to the surface. They were carved and polished into unique and rare jade specimens. The three-day festival is held at the Pacific Valley School north of nearby Gorda, California. Artists who work jade and other lapidary arts from all across the US, Canada, and New Zealand show their wares each year.

The 2019 festival featured 51 vendors, music and food. There is no entrance fee. Proceeds from booth rental and food sales at the festival fund local education and organizations. In May 2005, the organization contributed to construction of a combination classroom/community center at the Pacific Valley School. They have funded summer educational opportunities for Pacific Valley students, including trips abroad. They have also bought a vehicle and other gear for the Big Sur Volunteer Fire Brigade.
