= Beaver City =

Beaver City may refer to the following places in the United States:

- Beaver City, Indiana
- Beaver City, Nebraska
- Beaver, Oklahoma formerly Beaver City

== See also ==
- Beaver (disambiguation)#Places
- Beaverton (disambiguation)
- Beavertown (disambiguation)
- Beaverville (disambiguation)
