= Leah Peak =

Mountain in Alberta, Canada

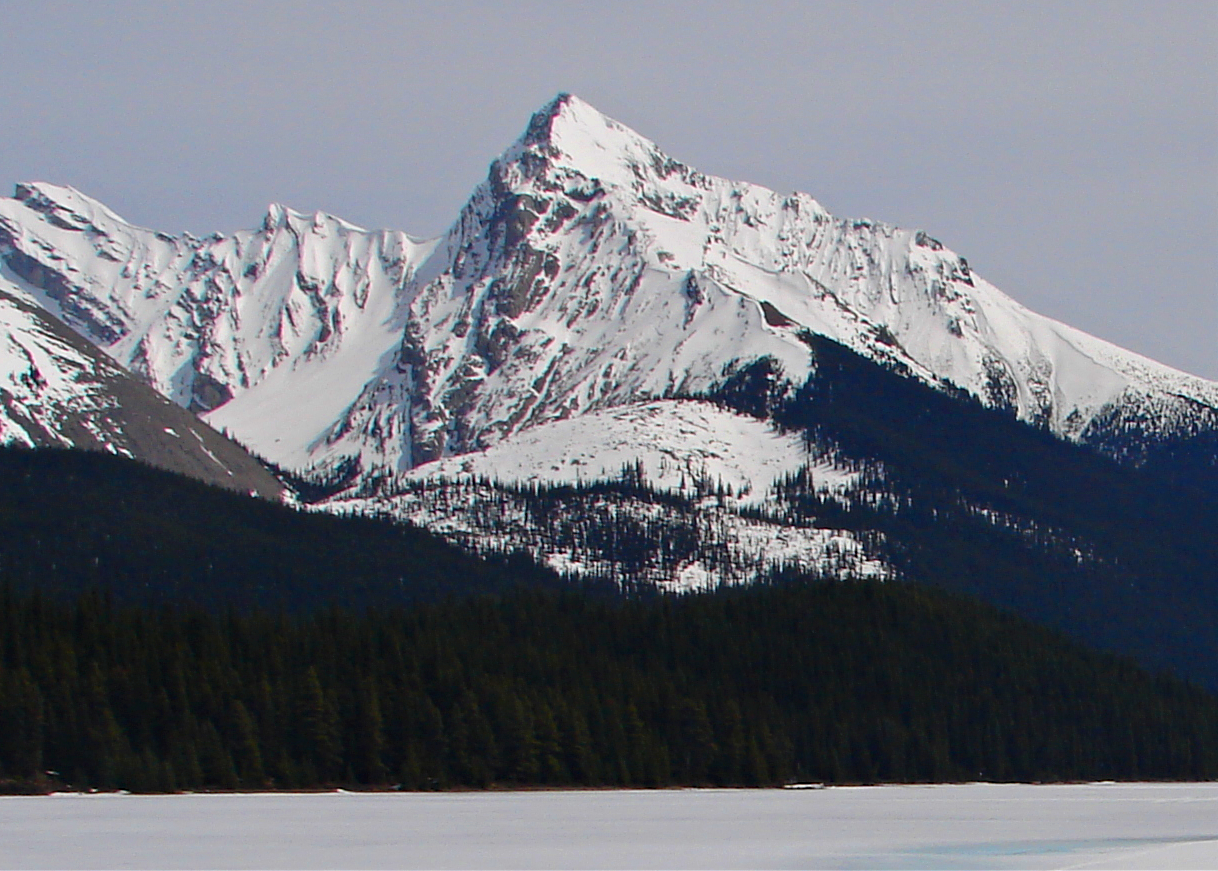
- Leah Peak seen from Maligne Lake

Highest point
- Elevation: 2,801 m (9,190 ft)
- Prominence: 300 m (980 ft)
- Parent peak: Samson Peak (3081 m)
- Listing: Mountains of Alberta
- Coordinates: 52°42′44″N 117°33′14″W

Geography
- Location within Alberta Location within Canada
- Country: Canada
- Province: Alberta
- Protected area: Jasper National Park
- Parent range: Queen Elizabeth Ranges; Canadian Rockies
- Topo map: NTS 83C12 Athabasca Falls

Geology
- Rock age: Devonian / Mississippian
- Rock type: limestone

Climbing
- First ascent: 1926 by R. Ecaubert and J. Weber (guide)

Leah Peak is a 2,801-metre (9,190 ft) mountain summit located on the eastern shore of Maligne Lake in Jasper National Park, in the Canadian Rockies of Alberta, Canada. The nearest higher peak is Samson Peak, 1.72 km (1.07 mi) to the north.

== History ==
Leah Peak was named by Mary Schäffer in her expedition through the area in 1908 to find Maligne Lake. She also named nearby Samson Peak. Leah Beaver was the wife of Samson Beaver. Samson was a Stoney Indian who befriended Mary and provided her with a hand drawn map to assist her with finding the way to the elusive lake. Samson visited the lake with his father at the age of 14, and 16 years later he drew the map from memory when he met Mary at Elliott Barnes' cabin on the Kootenay Plains in the Saskatchewan Valley.

The first ascent of Leah Peak was made in 1926 by R. Ecaubert and J. Weber. The mountain's name became official in 1956 by the Geographical Names Board of Canada.

== Climate ==
Based on the Köppen climate classification, Leah Peak is located in a subarctic climate with cold, snowy winters, and mild summers. Temperatures can drop below −20 °C with wind chill factors below −30 °C. Precipitation runoff from Leah Peak drains west into Maligne Lake, thence into the Maligne River which is a tributary of the Athabasca River.

== Gallery ==
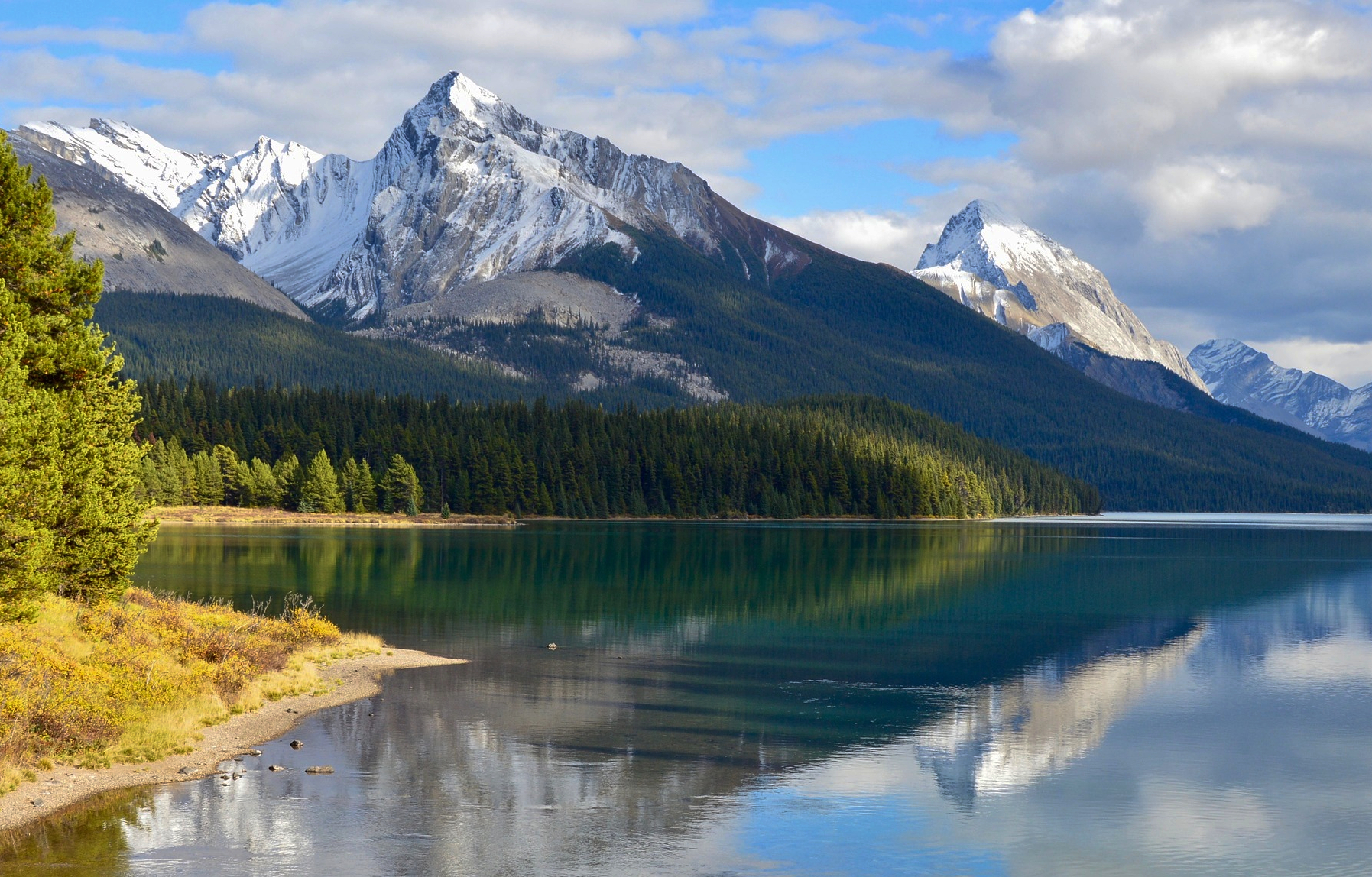
Leah Peak left of center, Samson Peak to right

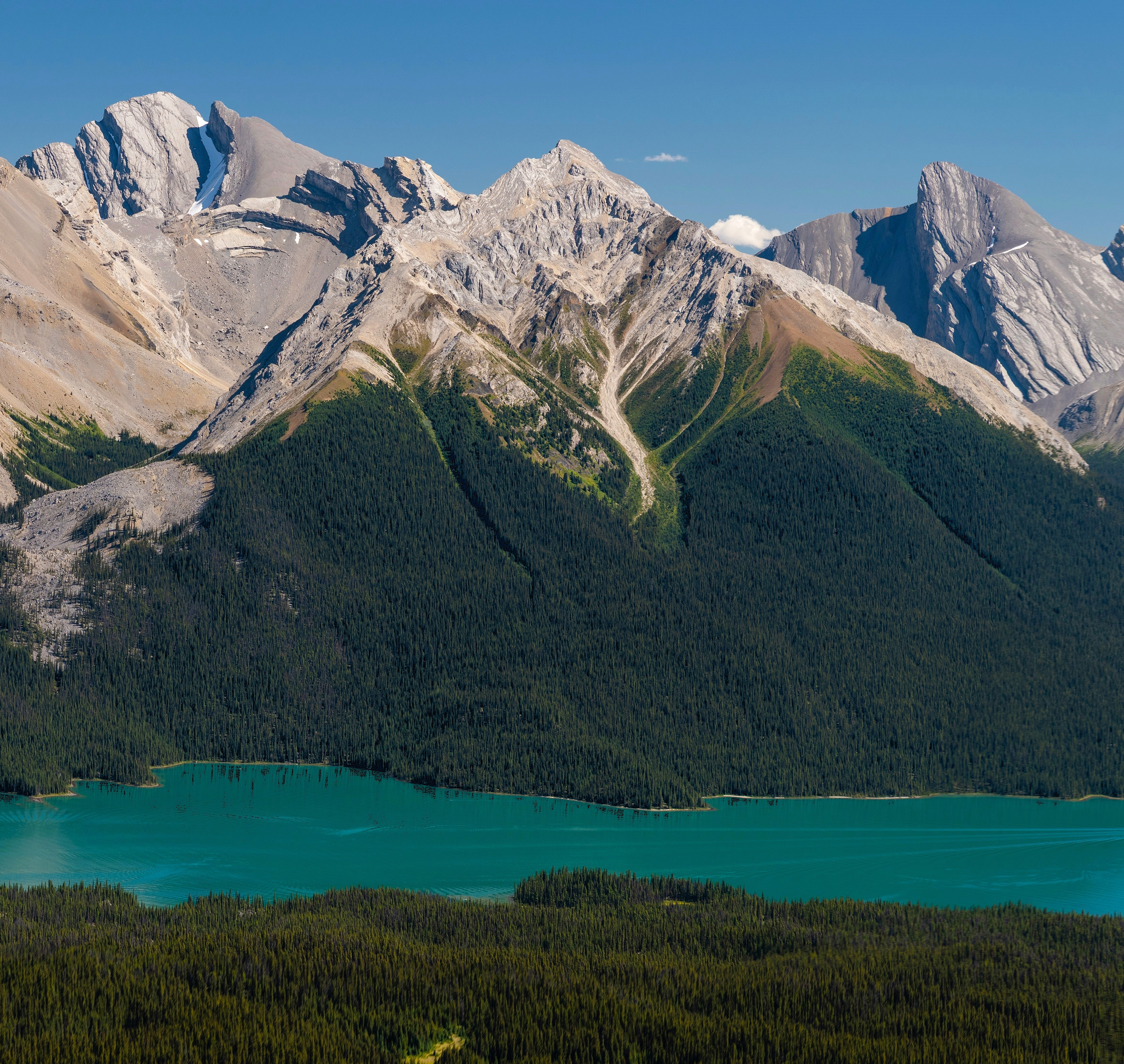
West aspect of Leah Peak (centered)

== See also ==
- List of mountains of Canada
- Geography of Alberta
