= William Beaver =

William Beaver may refer to:

- William H. Beaver (1940–2024), American accounting researcher and educator
- William T. Beaver (1933–2020), American medical researcher and educator
