= Beevers =

Beevers is an English surname. Notable people with this name include:

- Ben Beevers (born c. 1961), English rugby player
- C. Arnold Beevers (1908–2001), British crystallographer
- Geoffrey Beevers (born 1941), British actor
- Harry Beevers (1924–2004), American plant physiologist
- James Beevers (born 1979), British fencer
- Joe Beevers (born 1967), English poker player
- Lee Beevers (born 1983), British footballer
- Mark Beevers (born 1989), English footballer who plays defender
- Martin Beevers (born 1946), British fencer

== See also ==
- Beever
