= Beaverton =

Beaverton may refer to:

== Places ==
=== Canada ===
- Beaverton, Newfoundland and Labrador
- Beaverton, Ontario
  - Beaverton Aerodrome

=== United States ===
- Beaverton, Alabama
- Beaverton, Kansas
- Beaverton, Michigan
- Beaverton Township, Michigan
- Beaverton, Montana
- Beaverton, Oregon

== Arts, entertainment and media ==
- Beaverton, a fictional town in South Park, in the episode "Two Days Before the Day After Tomorrow"
- The Beaverton, an online news satire publication in Canada
  - The Beaverton (TV series), based on the publication
- Beaverton, a fictional city in the film Hoppers

== See also ==
- Beaver (disambiguation)
- Beavertown (disambiguation)
- Beaverville (disambiguation)
- Beaver City (disambiguation)
