= Beavertown =

Beavertown may refer to:

- Beavertown, Ohio, United States
- Beavertown, Blair County, Pennsylvania, United States
- Beavertown, Snyder County, Pennsylvania, United States
- Beavertown Brewery, a British brewery

== See also ==
- Beaver (disambiguation)
- Beaverton (disambiguation)
- Beaverville (disambiguation)
- Beaver City (disambiguation)
