= HMS Beaver =

Ten ships of the Royal Navy have been named HMS Beaver, after the animal, the beaver:

- HMS Beaver (1656), a ketch in the Royalist navy, captured by Parliamentary forces in 1656 and broken up two years later.
- HMS Beaver (1757), 18, a sloop originally called Trudaine and operating as a French privateer, but captured in 1757 and renamed before being sold in 1761.
- HMS Beaver (1761), 14, a sloop launched in 1761 and sold in 1783.
- HMS Beaver (1795), 14, a sloop launched in 1795 and sold in 1808.
- HMS Beaver (1809), 10, a Cherokee-class brig-sloop launched in 1809 and sold in 1829
- HMS Beaver (1837), a wooden paddle packet originally operating as a Post Office vessel but transferred to the Royal Navy in 1837. It became a dockyard lighter in 1845.
- HMS Beaver (1855), an Albacore-class gunboat launched in 1855 and broken up in 1864. This vessel was built hastily of unseasoned wood with the result that she was unsound and saw no service at all.
- HMS Beaver (1905), a 125-ton tender transferred from the War Department to the Royal Navy in 1905 and sold in 1911.
- HMS Beaver (1911), an Acheron-class destroyer launched in 1911 and sold in 1921.
- HMS Beaver (F93), a Type 22, or Broadsword-class frigate launched in 1982 and scrapped in 2001.

== Battle honours ==
The ships of the Royal Navy named Beaver have earned the following battle honours;

- Louisburg 1758
- Athalante 1804
- Heligoland 1914
- Atlantic 1942

== See also ==
- HMS Beaver's Prize (or Beaver Prize), was the 24-gun Pennsylvania State privateer Oliver Cromwell, which Beaver captured 12 June 1777. She was commissioned into the Royal Navy shortly thereafter. She was wrecked in 1780, with the loss of many of her crew, in the harbour at St Lucia in a storm.
- Other ships named Beaver
