= Samson Peak =

Mountain summit in Jasper National Park, Alberta, Canada

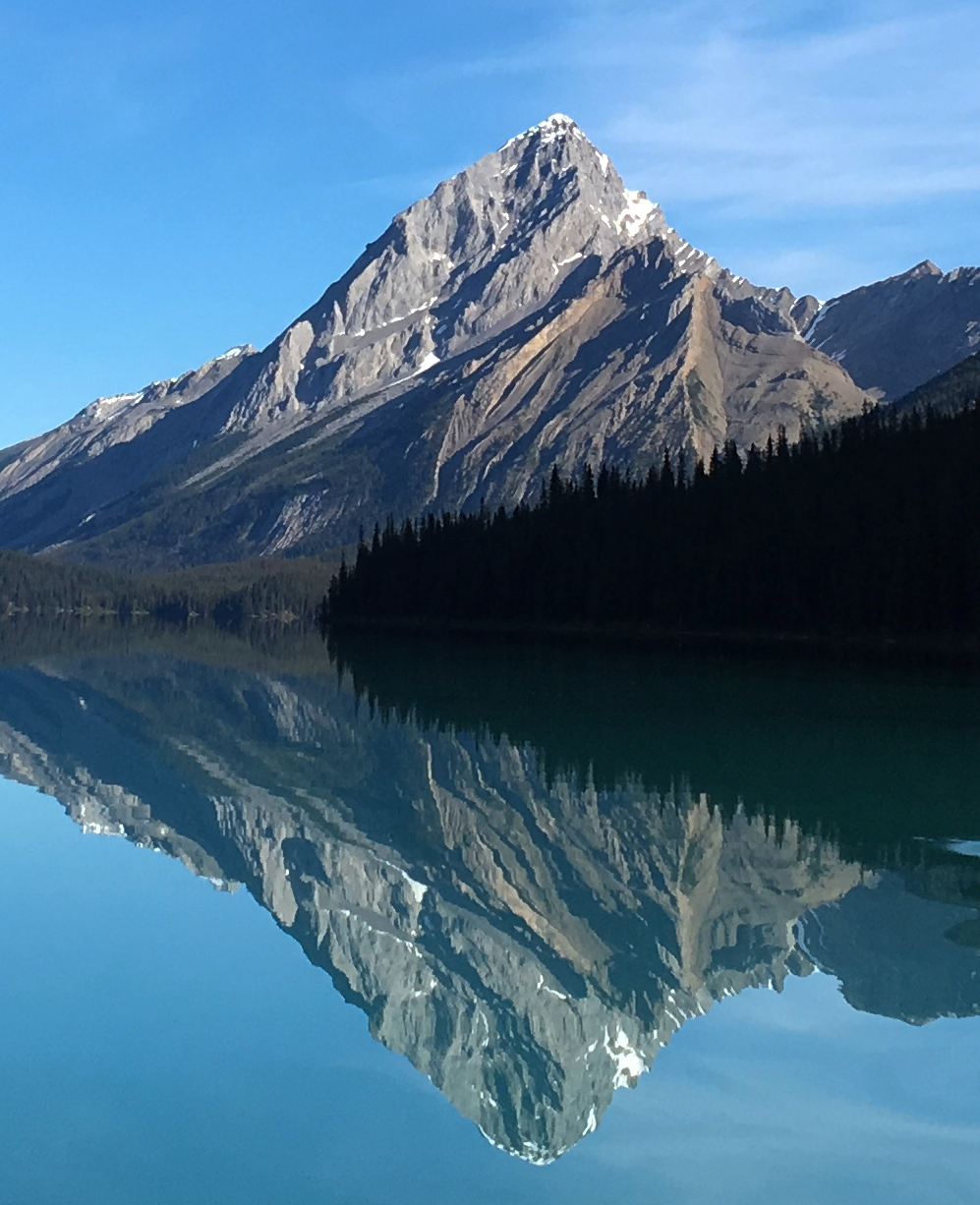
- Samson Peak reflected in Maligne Lake

Highest point
- Elevation: 3,081 m (10,108 ft)
- Prominence: 456 m (1,496 ft)
- Parent peak: Maligne Mountain (3200 m)
- Listing: Mountains of Alberta
- Coordinates: 52°40′49″N 117°30′38″W

Geography
- Location within Alberta Location within Canada
- Interactive map of Samson Peak
- Country: Canada
- Province: Alberta
- Protected area: Jasper National Park
- Parent range: Queen Elizabeth Ranges; Canadian Rockies
- Topo map: NTS 83C12 Athabasca Falls

Geology
- Rock age: Devonian
- Rock type: Palliser Limestone

Climbing
- First ascent: 1928 by W.R. Hainsworth and M.M. Strumia

Samson Peak is a 3,081-metre (10,108 ft) mountain summit located on the eastern shore of Maligne Lake in Jasper National Park, in the Canadian Rockies of Alberta, Canada. The nearest higher peak is Mount Charlton, 7.26 km (4.51 mi) to the east. Samson Peak is situated 1.72 km south of Leah Peak in the Queen Elizabeth Ranges.

== History ==
Samson Peak was named by Mary Schäffer in her expedition through the area in 1908 to find Maligne Lake. She also named nearby Leah Peak for Leah Beaver, the wife of Samson Beaver. Samson was a Stoney Indian who befriended Mary and provided her with a hand drawn map to assist her with finding the way to the elusive lake. Samson visited the lake with his father at the age of 14, and 16 years later he drew the map from memory when he met Mary at Elliott Barnes' cabin on the Kootenay Plains in the Saskatchewan Valley.

The first ascent of Samson Peak was made in 1928 by W.R. Hainsworth and M.M. Strumia The mountain's name was officially adopted in 1947 by the Geographical Names Board of Canada.

== Climate ==
Based on the Köppen climate classification, Samson Peak is located in a subarctic climate zone with cold, snowy winters, and mild summers. Winter temperatures can drop below −20 °C with wind chill factors below −30 °C. Precipitation runoff from Samson Peak drains west into Maligne Lake, thence into the Maligne River which is a tributary of the Athabasca River.

== Gallery ==
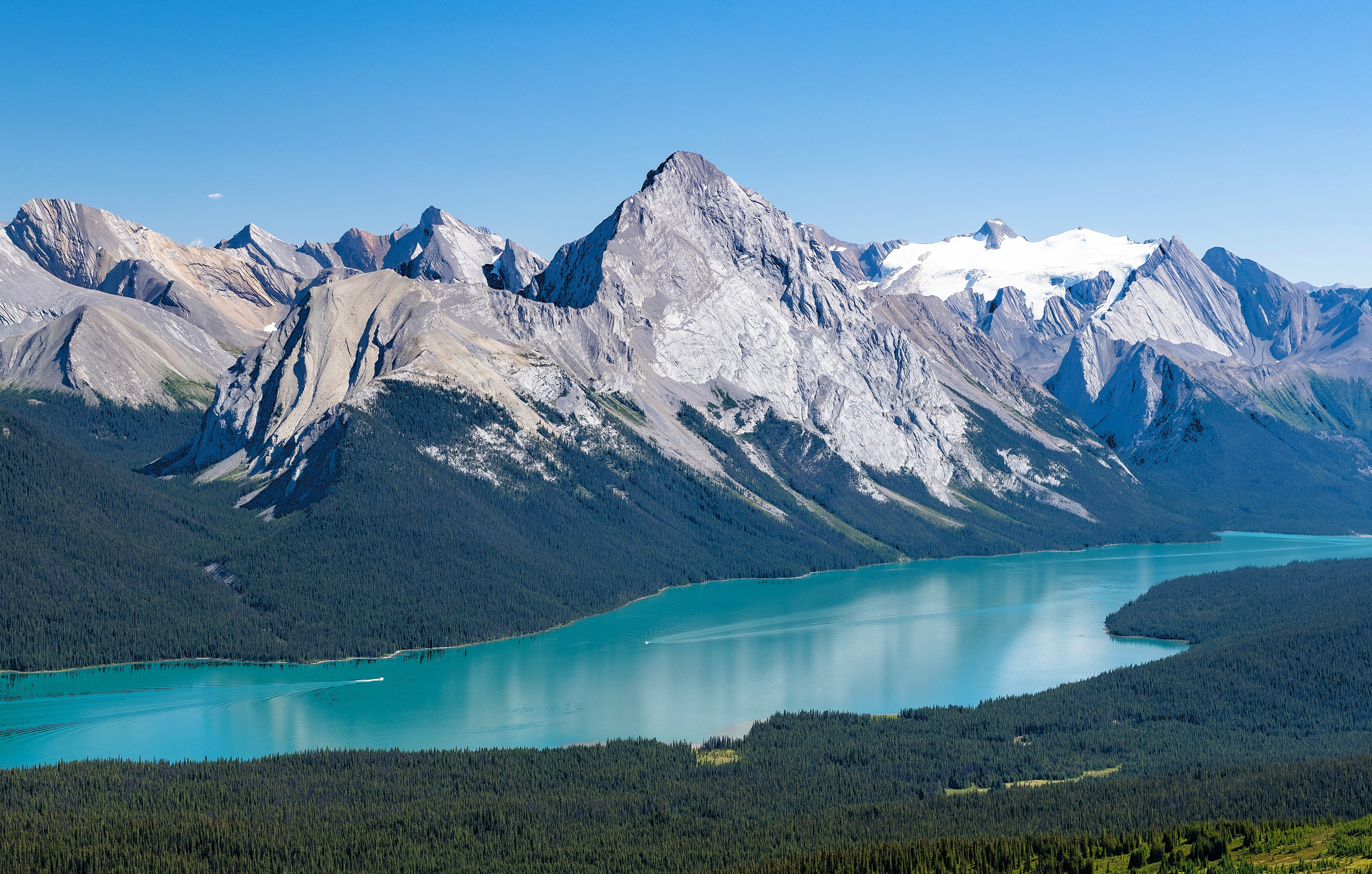
Samson Peak centered above Maligne Lake

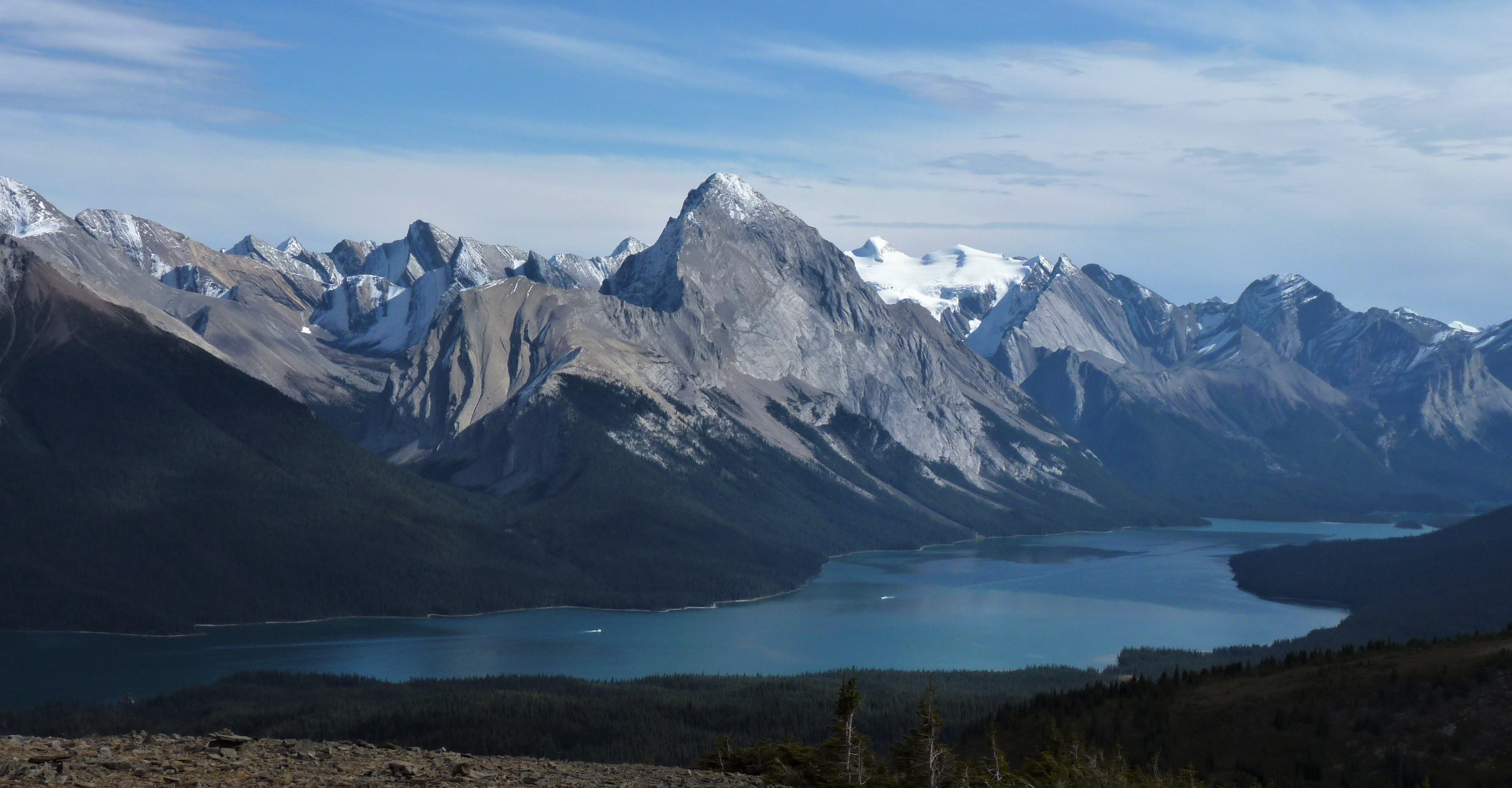
Samson Peak centered

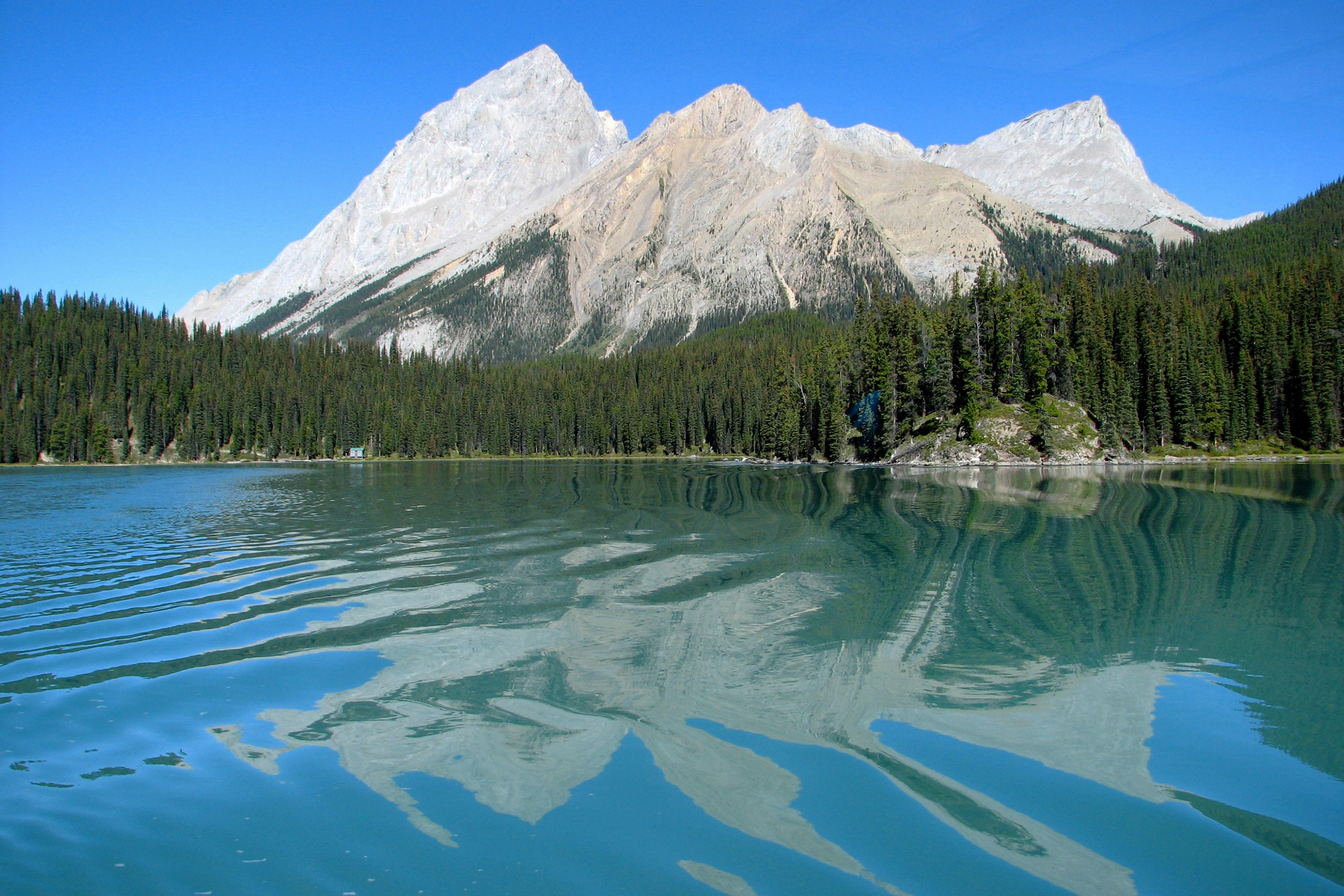
Samson Peak to left

== See also ==
- List of mountains of Canada
- Geography of Alberta
