= Sand Dollar Beach =

State park in California, United States

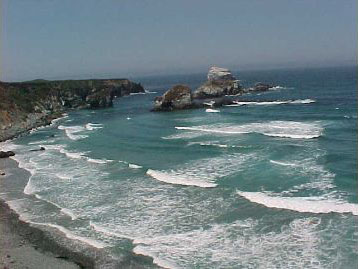
- Sand Dollar Beach

- Location within California Location within the United States
- Location: Monterey County, United States
- Nearest city: Gorda
- Coordinates: 35°55′26″N 121°28′27″W
- Governing body: California Department of Parks and Recreation

Sand Dollar Beach is a .5 miles (0.80 km) long beach in Big Sur, California, one of the longest publicly accessible beaches on that coast. It is within the Los Padres National Forest. The beach is 3.7 miles (6.0 km) north of the small commercial center of Gorda and 38.5 miles (62.0 km) north of Cambria. It is 25 miles (40 km) south of Big Sur Village on Highway 1.
