= Big Sur Unified School District =

School district in California, United States

Address
- 69325 Highway 1 Big Sur, California, 93920; United States

District information
- Type: Public
- Grades: K–12
- Superintendent: Debbie Gold
- Schools: 2
- NCES District ID: 0600031

Students and staff
- Students: 9 (2020–2021)
- Teachers: 3.2 (FTE)
- Staff: 7.77 (FTE)
- Student–teacher ratio: 2.81:1

Other information
- Website: www.bigsurunified.org

Big Sur Unified School District is a public school district in the southern Big Sur region of Monterey County, California, United States. It was originally the Pacific Valley School in the 1920s and served residents on the south coast including Manchester, Plaskett, Lucia, and Gorda.

== Pacific Valley School ==
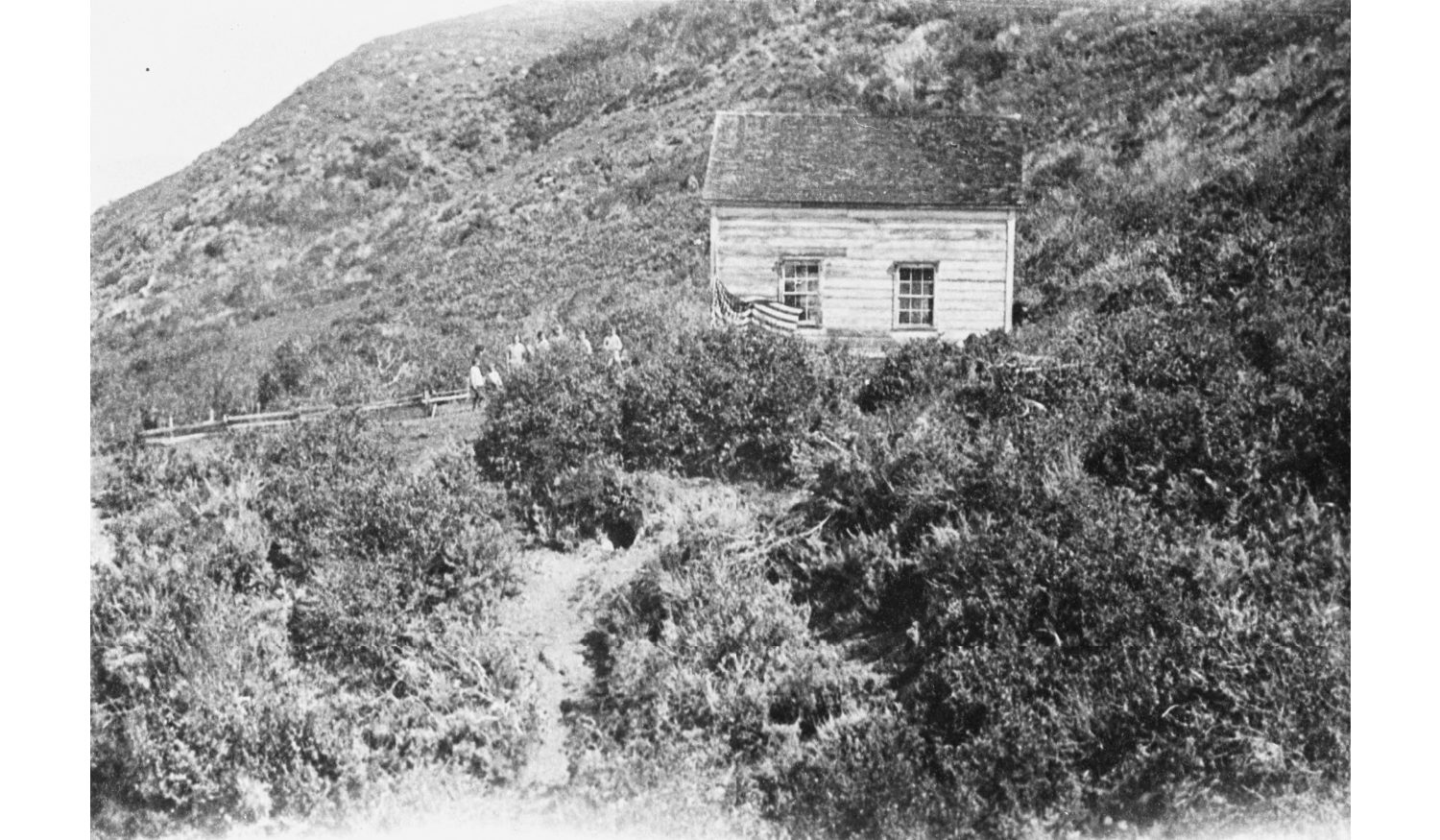
The Pacific School on the Big Sur coast hosted a branch of the Monterey County Library in 1922.

The Pacific Valley School District was formally established in the 1950s and was renamed Big Sur Unified School District in 2012, although it does not include the Cooper School in Big Sur Village, California which is administered as part of the Carmel Unified School District. It consists of two schools.

=== Pacific Valley School ===
The public Pacific Valley School is located in the Pacific Valley, an open bench of land on the coast of southern Big Sur. It serves students in grades K–12 in several small hamlets and communities.

Pacific Valley School has a 3:1 student/teacher ratio. The small student population of 20-24 students, taught by three faculty, spans preschool through twelfth grade. They engage in collaborative learning between age groups. All of the administrative staff also serve as teachers or teachers aides. The school is located at 69325 Highway 1 in southern Big Sur. 73% of its students receive a free or reduced price lunch.

=== Big Sur Charter School ===
The school district is the authorizing agency for the Big Sur Charter School located in Monterey, California, 64 miles (103 km) to the north of the Pacific Valley School. It describes itself as a "non-classroom based school, "

It provides education for children too "learn at home, in their communities, and in nature." Their total enrollment is 101 students in grades K-12. The school has a student/teacher ratio of 26:1, higher than the California state level of 23:1.

== See also ==
Plaskett, California
