= Beaverville =

Beaverville may refer to the following places:

- Beaverville, Illinois, U.S.
- Beaverville Township, Iroquois County, Illinois, U.S.
- Beaverville, New Jersey, U.S.

== See also ==
- Beaver (disambiguation)
- Beaverton (disambiguation)
- Beavertown (disambiguation)
- Beaver City (disambiguation)
