= Beaver Falls =

Beaver Falls may refer to:

== Places in the United States ==
- Beaver Falls, Minnesota
- Beaver Falls, New York
- Beaver Falls (Columbia County, Oregon)
- Beaver Falls, Pennsylvania
- Beaver Falls Township, Renville County, Minnesota
- Beaver Falls, on Havasu Creek, Arizona

== Other uses ==
- Beaver Falls (TV series), a British comedy-drama

== See also ==
- Beaver Creek Falls
