= Samson Beaver =

Canadian trail guide

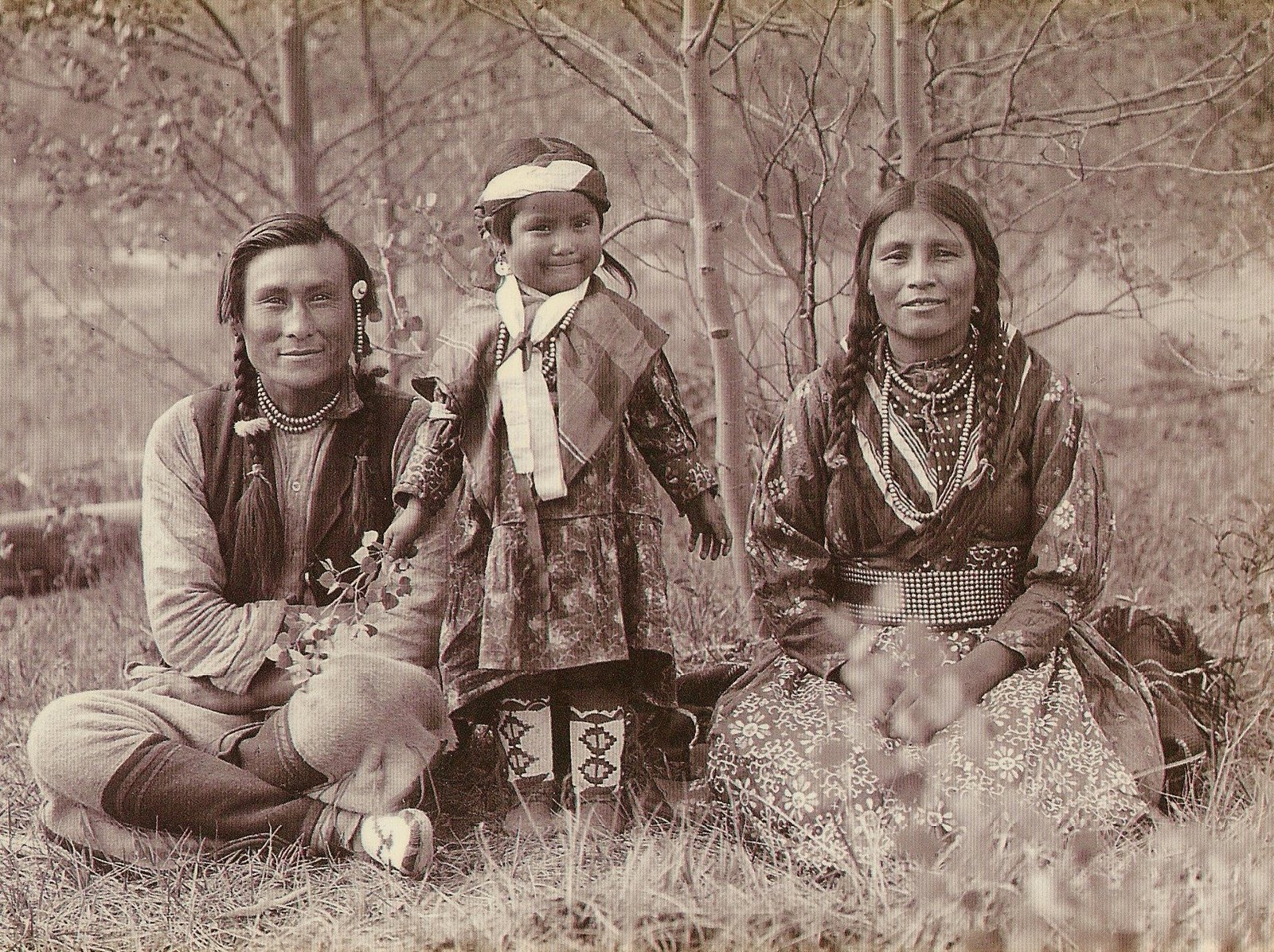
Samson Beaver, Leah, and a daughter

Samson Beaver was the son of Job Beaver, a guide and trail setter of the late 19th and early 20th century. Both were members of the Stoney First Nation and worked in the Rocky Mountains of Canada. Job Beaver's contributions to exploration of the Rockies is recorded in Job Pass, Job Creek and other locales. As a boy of fourteen, Samson accompanied his father on a trip to the lake they called Chaba Imne (Beaver lake). Sixteen years later, in 1907, Samson met Mary Schäffer, who had just failed in an attempt to find the route to a reputed large lake high in the mountains between Lake Louise and Jasper. Samson sketched a map showing the route to Chaba Imne. The following year Schäffer returned with her friend Mary Adams, guides Sid Unwin and Billy Warren. Using the map provided by Beaver, they found the lake, and explored it by raft (which they named HMS Chaba). The lake is now known as Maligne Lake.

Samson Peak, located in the Maligne Lake Valley and visible from Maligne lake, is named for Samson Beaver. Nearby Leah Peak is named for his wife. The peaks were named by Mary Schäffer, in honour of Samson & Leah's contribution to her survey work and Rocky mountain exploration.

Samson, Leah and their daughter Frances Louise have been memorialized in a photograph by Mary Schäffer (1907). The photo has since become a highly popular post card image, and the subject of academic discourse.
