= Beaver Valley =

Beaver Valley may refer to the following places

== Media ==
- In Beaver Valley, a 1950 short documentary film, directed by James Algar, and produced by Walt Disney, also titled Beaver Valley

== Places ==
- Beaver Valley, Arizona, U.S.
- Beaver Valley, Delaware and Pennsylvania, U.S.
- Beaver Valley Estates, Alberta, Canada
- Beaver Valley Nuclear Power Station, near Shippingport, Pennsylvania, U.S.

== Valleys ==
- Beaver Valley (Ontario), Canada
- Beaver Valley (Utah), U.S.

== See also ==
- Beaver River (Pennsylvania)
