= Martin Beevers =

British fencer

Personal information
- Born: 11 June 1946 (age 80)

Sport
- Sport: Fencing

Martin Beevers (born 11 June 1946) is a British fencer. He competed in the team épée event at the 1976 Summer Olympics.
