= Beaver (1793 ship) =

British merchant ship and whaler 1793–1797

History

Great Britain
- Name: Beaver
- Namesake: Beaver
- Launched: 1793, Thames
- Captured: 1797

General characteristics
- Tons burthen: 287(bm)
- Armament: 1794: 12 × 6-pounder guns; 1796: 4 × 6-pounder guns

Beaver was launched on the Thames in 1793. She traded between London and Canada but in 1796 she became a whaler in the Southern whale fishery. The Spanish captured her in 1797 off the south American coast, shortly after the outbreak of war between Spain and Britain.

== Career ==
Beaver first appeared in Lloyd's Register (LR) in 1793.

Year	Master	Owner	Trade	Source
1793	J.Beatson	Illegible	London–Montreal	LR
1795	J.Beatson; Boyd	M'Tavish	London–Quebec	LR
1796	Boyd; B.Gardner	M'Tavish	London–Quebec; London–South Seas	LR

Alexander and Benjamin Champion acquired Beaver to sail her as a whaler in the Southern Whale Fishery. Captain Barnabas Gardner sailed from London on 8 April 1796, bound for Chile.

Beaver was near the Cape Verde Islands by 13 May. By December she was off the coast of Chile. Then on 8 March 1797 she was off Concepcion.

== Fate ==
Spain declared war on Great Britain on 7 October 1796. However, took some time for the news to reach the Pacific. Early in 1797 the Spanish captured Lydia, Betsey, and Levant. Following the capture of Commerce, Clark, master, at Pisco in April 1797, the Spanish captured a number of other British vessels in Talcahuano, Coquimbo, and Valparaiso. By 23 May, the Spanish had captured Beaver, Castor, Charmilly, Alderney, Jupiter, and Atlantic.

Lloyd's List reported on 13 February 1798 that Beaver, Gardner, master, was one of several British whalers that the Spanish had captured off the coasts of Chile and Peru. The report included the other vessels listed above.
