= Beaver (1873 sternwheeler) =

1873 sternwheel steamboat

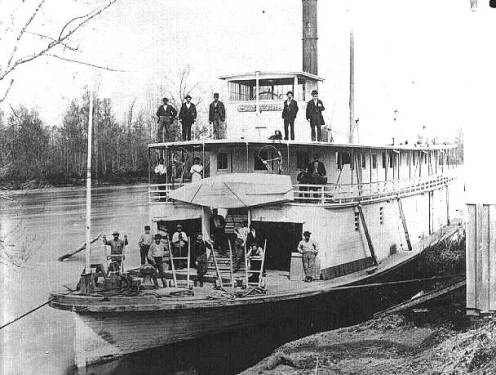
- Beaver (sternwheel steamboat)

History
- Owner: Willamette Transportation Co., Willamette Falls Locks and Canal Co.
- Route: Willamette, lower Columbia, and Stikine rivers
- Launched: August 21, 1873, at Portland
- In service: 1873
- Identification: US registry # 2889
- Fate: May 17, 1878, hit rock and sank on Stikine River

General characteristics
- Type: Shallow draft inland passenger/freighter
- Tonnage: 292 gross register tons
- Length: 125 ft (38.1 m)
- Beam: 25 ft (7.6 m)
- Depth: 5.0 ft (1.5 m) depth of hold
- Installed power: Steam, twin high pressure horizontally mounted, single-cylinder engines, 14-inch bore by 48-inch stroke, 13 hp (9.7 kW) nominal
- Propulsion: sternwheel

Beaver was a sternwheel steamboat built in 1873 for the Willamette Transportation Company.

== Service history ==
In 1875 Beaver passed into the ownership of the Willamette Falls Locks and Canal Company. Beaver worked on the Willamette River and then on the Columbia River on the run from Portland, Oregon to Astoria, Oregon.

In June 1876 Beaver was sold to Uriah Nelson and taken north to the Stikine River to serve traffic generated by the Cassiar Gold Rush.

On May 17, 1878 Beaver struck a rock 60 miles (97 km) below Glenora, British Columbia. The boat was wrecked but her machinery was salvaged.
