= Beaver (tugboat) =

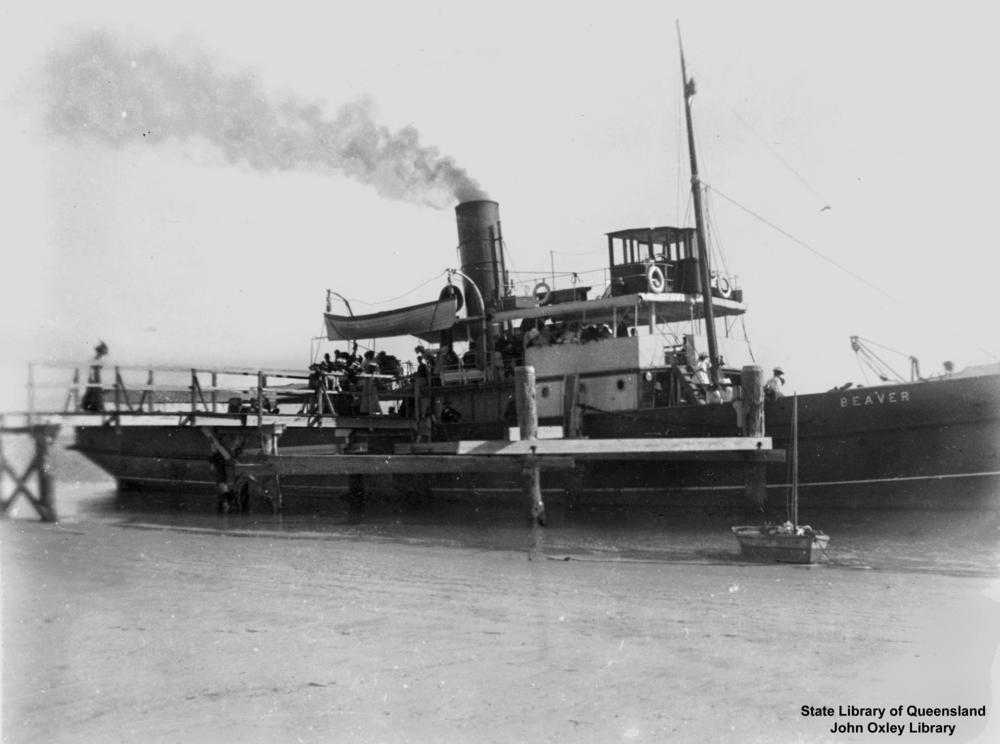

History
- Builder: Ramage & Ferguson
- Launched: August 3, 1886
- Fate: Converted to a barge in 1948

General characteristics
- Type: Tugboat
- Tonnage: 222 grt
- Length: 135.2 feet (41.2 m)

The Beaver was a steam tugboat, built in Scotland, and launched on August 3, 1886, for the Brisbane Tug & Steam Ship Company of Brisbane, Australia. She subsequently had at least three owners. In 1948 she was converted to a barge.
