= Beaver tail =

Beaver tail or Beavertail may refer to:

- The tail of a beaver
- Beaver tail (pastry), a fried dough food
  - BeaverTails, a Canadian restaurant chain specializing in beaver tail pastries
- Opuntia basilaris, beavertail cactus or beavertail pricklypear
- Calochortus coeruleus, beavertail grass
- Beavertail State Park, in Rhode Island, U.S.
- Beavertail Hill State Park, in Montana, U.S.
- Beavertail, a type of flatbed truck tow truck
- Beaver Tail (railcar), built by the Chicago, Milwaukee, St. Paul and Pacific Railroad 1934–1938
- Beaver-tail, an observation car on The Coronation British passenger train, from 1937
- Polish plait, a hairstyle
