= Beaver Mountain (Wyoming) =

Mountain in Wyoming, United States

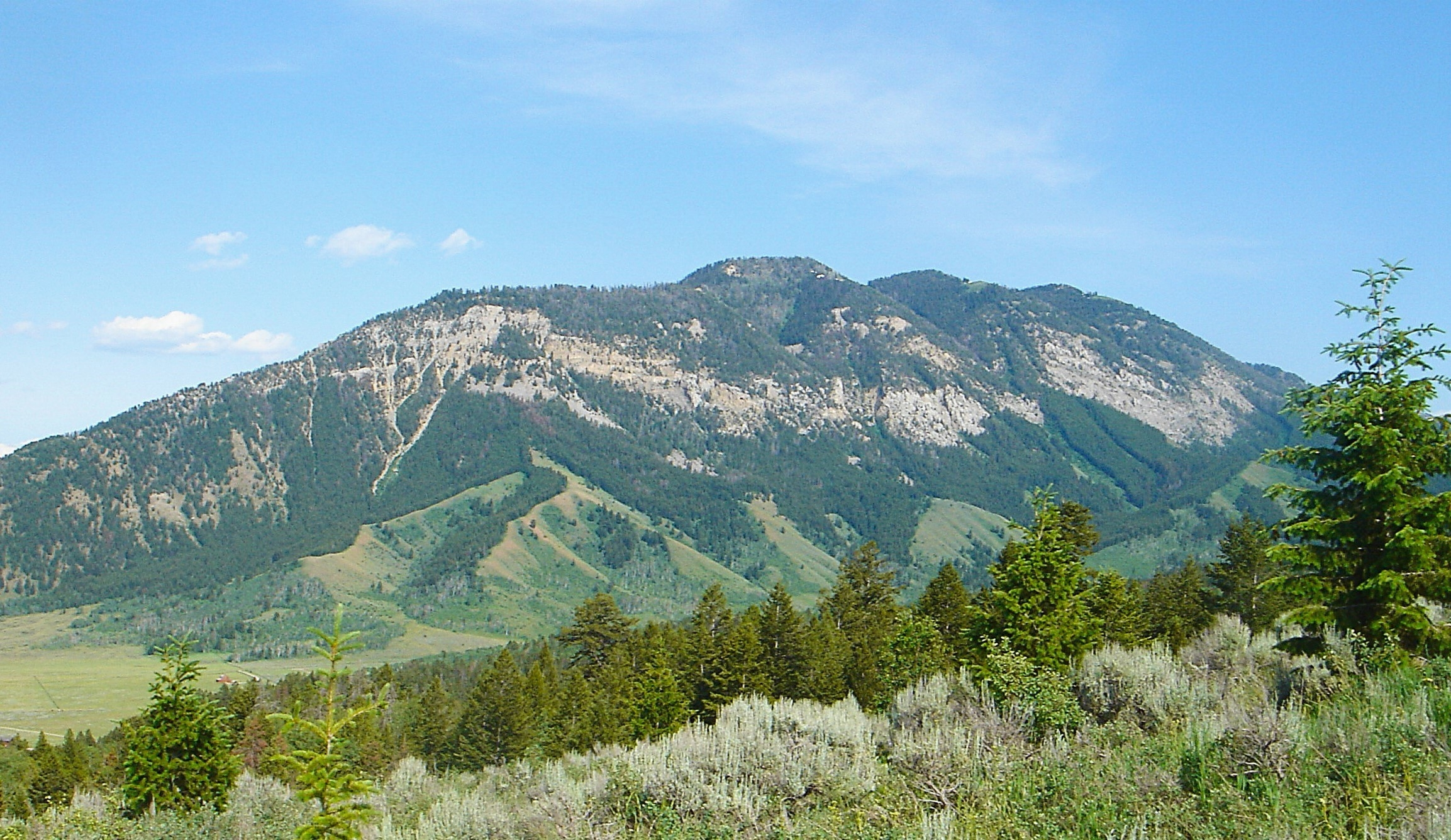
- Northwest aspect

Highest point
- Elevation: 9,851 ft (3,003 m)
- Prominence: 556 ft (169 m)
- Parent peak: Ramshorn Peak (10,368 ft)
- Isolation: 2.67 mi (4.30 km)
- Coordinates: 43°15′03″N 110°36′45″W

Geography
- Location within Wyoming Location within the United States
- Country: United States
- State: Wyoming
- County: Teton
- Protected area: Bridger–Teton National Forest
- Parent range: Wyoming Range; Rocky Mountains
- Topo map: USGS Bull Creek

Climbing
- Easiest route: class 2 hiking

Ramshorn Peak is a 9,851-foot-elevation (3,003-meter) summit in Teton County, Wyoming, United States.

== Description ==
Beaver Mountain is located approximately 40 miles (64 km) west of the Continental Divide in the Wyoming Range which is a subrange of the Rocky Mountains. It is set on land managed by Bridger–Teton National Forest and can be seen from Highway 189/191. The nearest city is Jackson, Wyoming, 17 miles (27 km) to the north-northwest. Precipitation runoff from the mountain drains into tributaries of the Hoback River which shortly thereafter empties to the Snake River. Topographic relief is significant as the summit rises 3,650 feet (1,113 meters) above the Hoback River in two miles (3.2 km). The mountain is popular in winter with expert downhill skiers, and paragliders and hang gliders in summer. The mountain's toponym has been officially adopted by the United States Board on Geographic Names.

== Climate ==
According to the Köppen climate classification system, Beaver Mountain is located in an alpine subarctic climate zone with cold, snowy winters, and cool to warm summers. Due to its altitude, it receives precipitation all year, as snow in winter, and as thunderstorms in summer.

== See also ==
- List of mountain peaks of Wyoming
