= Beaver County =

Beaver County may refer to the following places:

== Canada ==
- Beaver County, Alberta

== United States ==
- Beaver County, Oklahoma
- Beaver County, Pennsylvania
- Beaver County, Utah
