= Beaver Falls (Columbia County, Oregon) =

Waterfall in Northwest Oregon, United States

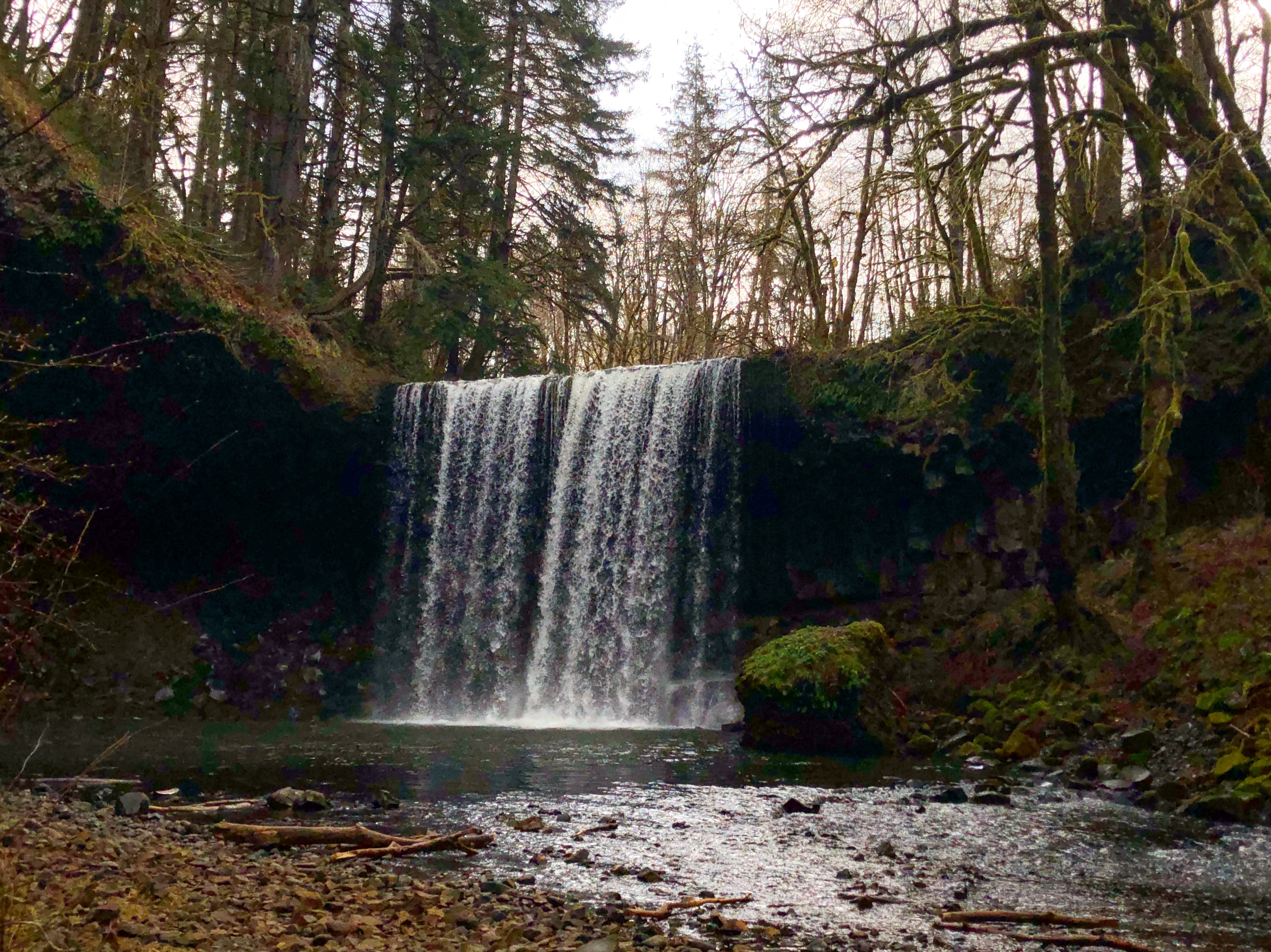
- Beaver Falls in March 2019.
- Interactive map of Beaver Falls
- Location: Columbia River Gorge
- Coordinates: 46.10444°N 123.12417°W
- Type: Vertical Curtain
- Elevation: 233 ft (71 m)
- Total height: 48 ft (15 m)
- Average flow rate: 50 cu ft/s (1.4 m^{3}/s)

Beaver Falls, is a waterfall located on Beaver Creek near the town of Clatskanie in Columbia County, in the U.S. state of Oregon.

== Description ==
The waterfall is formed as Beaver Creek sheets out onto a wide channel over a 40 foot wide chute at high velocity, falling into a natural amphitheater of layered basalt. Beaver Falls Trail leads to Beaver Falls in 0.3 miles (0.48 km) from a trailhead on Beaver Falls Road. The waterfall and trail are surrounded by Douglas fir, western red-cedar, western hemlock, and big-leaf maple. Sword fern, Oregon grape, and salal are very common plant life growing beneath the forest canopy.

== See also ==
- List of waterfalls in Oregon
