= Northern Light (spacecraft) =

Cancelled Canadian Mars lander and rover mission

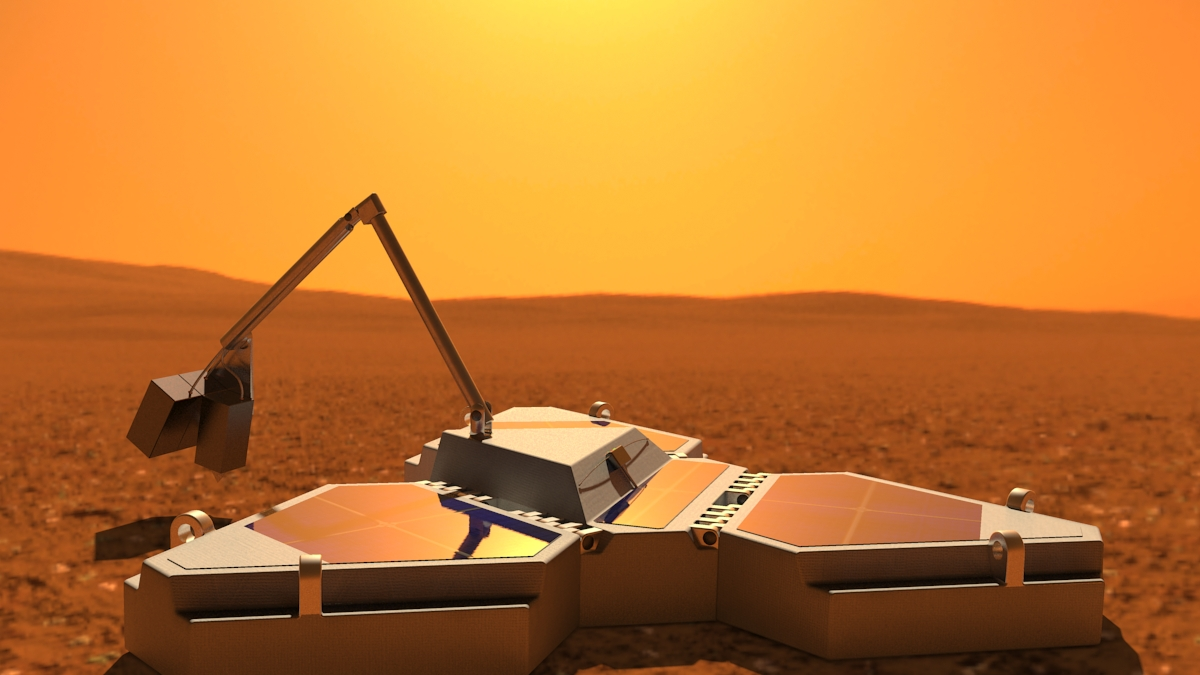
- Northern Light Lander on Mars (artist's impression)
- Mission type: Mars rover
- Operator: Northern Light Consortium
- Website: www.marsrocks.ca

Spacecraft properties
- Manufacturer: Thoth Technology
- Landing mass: 35 kilograms (77 lb) lander 6 kilograms (13 lb) rover

Start of mission
- Launch date: cancelled

Northern Light was a concept mission for a robotic mission to Mars that would consist of a lander and a rover, being studied by a consortium of Canadian universities, companies and organisations. The primary contractor for the spacecraft was Thoth Technology Inc.

The spacecraft would consist of four parts: an apogee kick engine to provide orbital injection for a cruise vehicle that carries the Northern Light lander and the Beaver Rover to a direct rendezvous with Mars using a Hohmann transfer orbit. Atmospheric entry would be achieved by a heat shield, parachute and airbag deployment system. The lander would transfer the rover to the Martian surface. Once deployed on the Martian surface, the lander contacts Earth directly to the 46 m parabolic antenna located at the Algonquin Radio Observatory.

The Beaver Rover was proposed to have a maximum range of 1000 metres (0.62 mile) from the landing site. It would have operated under battery, utilizing tools and sensors to investigate surface rocks that may contain the presence of photosynthetic life.

== History ==
The project officially started in 2001, and its project leader was Ben Quine, from York University, Canada. York University has participated in the Canadian Space Program and has designed several space research instruments and applications currently used by NASA, including the meteorological station on board the Phoenix Mars lander.

Partners in this Mars project were York University, University of Alberta, University of Toronto, University of Waterloo, University of Winnipeg, University of Western Ontario, University of Saskatchewan, University of New Brunswick, McGill University and Simon Fraser University. The mission control for the period after it lands on Mars, would have been headquartered at York University.

The cost was estimated at $20 million, or possibly less if another country shares the rocket. The Canadian Space Agency confirmed it knows of the project, but has no involvement in it. In 2014, a crowd sourcing campaign to support the mission was launched on Indiegogo and YouTube in order to raise $1.1 million Canadian dollars for development of the flight hardware, but the drive raised only $10,012.

== Scientific goals ==
There are four primary goals for the mission:

1. Search for life on Mars
2. Search for water on Mars
3. Investigate Martian electromagnetic radiation environment and atmospheric properties
4. Prepare for the international effort of a Mars sample return mission and a human mission to Mars

== Payload of the Beaver Rover ==
The rover system was required for geological surface exploration and for subsurface imaging. With a mass of approximately 6 kg (13.2 lb), the rover would operate under its own power and have a range of roughly 1 km (0.62 mi). The rover would be equipped with a visible camera for manoeuvering and surface exploration, as well as a Point Spectrometer and microscope camera for geological survey. A ground-penetrating radar would explore the Martian subsurface and look for water; an active vibrator and receiver would use short, sub-millisecond pulses to conduct an acoustic study of the subsurface. For immediate subsurface exploration, the rover would be equipped with a rock grinding tool.

=== MASSur Seismic Sensor ===
The MASSur Seismic Sensor, developed by the University of Calgary would have provided depth profiles of the Martian surface. Specifically, a seismometer would conduct tests to determine the rigidity and elasticity of the Martian topsoil as well as its rock properties. Sediments, permafrost, and water may all have distinct signatures. This seismic system would use a vibrational source and elastic-wave receivers (accelerometers) on both the lander and on the Beaver Rover. The redundancy of lander and rover apparatus, ensures that some primary science objectives can be met without rover deployment.

=== Ground Penetrating Radar ===
The Ground-Penetrating Radar (GPR) would have utilized a 200 MHz radar to provide fine-scale, sub-surface imaging to a depth of 20 m (65 ft) on loose aggregate and up to 100 m (328 ft) on permafrost or ice. The concept design shares several systems with the seismic instruments.

=== TC Corer ===
The corer would be capable of drilling up to 10 mm into surface rocks. This tool would be used in conjunction with the Aurora spectrometer and microscope to examine the near-surface composition and to look for biosignatures of near-surface life. The core would have been contributed to the mission from Hong Kong. The flight model instrument has an estimated mass of 350 g.

== Payload of the Northern Light Lander ==
=== Aurora Spectrometer ===
The proposed spectrometer has a wavelength coverage of 625 nm to 2500 nm and observes the whole sky. The instrument would measure variations in spectral irradiance which can be utilized to determine aerosol and atmospheric composition including the concentration of carbon dioxide, the major constituent of the Martian atmosphere. It would also carry out angular dependency of radiation influx in the atmosphere. The Aurora instrument has a mass of 450 g.

=== Argus Spectrometer ===
Similar in design to the Argus 1000 spectrometer flown on CanX-2, the radiometer would be the primary equipment of the Northern Light lander making measurements of spectral rock reflectance. The spectrometer has a mass of 240 g.

=== Camera systems ===
The camera systems on the lander would have the capability of narrow and wide field surveys. The narrow field survey would have provided a very high resolution, panoramic view of the landing site. Colour filters would perform some spectral mapping and mineral identification of the surrounding soil; the camera would also perform limited atmospheric and astronomical observations. Colour images of Earth would have been obtained.

The wide field survey would provide an overall colour view of the lander's surroundings to help rover deployment and route planning.

=== MASSur Seismic Sensors ===
Similar specifications as those on the Beaver Rover.

=== Environmental sensors ===
Environmental sensors would monitor environmental conditions at the landing site. Various instruments would have measured UV rays, oxidising substances, air pressure, air temperature, dust impact, wind velocity, and ground vibration. These sensors would have a combined mass of 130 g. Flight models were previously developed for Britain's Beagle 2 lander.

== Tracking ==
The entry system would have been tracked and targeted utilizing a combination of Doppler radar and very long baseline interferometry. This data would processed by a high-resolution orbital model that utilizes high-precision ephemeris to predict spacecraft location and trajectory.

Upon launch, tracking would commence at the Algonquin Radio Observatory. After orbital injection, the spacecraft would be contacted periodically to obtain system status and to determine trajectory. As the package reaches the Martian thermosphere continuous tracking would commence in order to verify mechanism deployment during descent.

== Landing site ==
The landing site would have been determined from one of three options by crowd sourcing campaign. One option was a dry 'sea', within 5 km of a basin formation.

== See also ==
- Robotic spacecraft
