= Beaver fraternal orders =

There have been a number of interlocking fraternal orders known as the beavers. The Fraternal Order of Beavers was created in 1911. The relationships between these and the Beavers Reserve Fund Fraternity, Beavers National Mutual Benefit and the National Mutual Benefit is complex. The North American Order of the Beaver was founded in 1990.

== Beavers Reserve Fund Fraternity ==
The earliest "beaver" fraternal order was the Beavers Reserve Fund Fraternity founded in 1902, and initially based in Stoughton, Wisconsin. It was later based in Madison. It only operated in the state of Wisconsin and had 16,900 members as of Jan. 1, 1923.

== Beavers National Mutual Benefit ==
The Beavers National Mutual Benefit grew out of the above group in 1916. Members of the Beavers Reserve Fund Fraternity who felt that the latter's flat rate assessment policy was insufficient were allowed to transfer their policies to the new organization. That same year the new organization absorbed the Fraternal Order of Rangers and the Supreme Assembly of the Defenders. In 1919 it absorbed the National Fraternal League. The group discarded its ritual and became National Mutual Benefit in 1931. This order absorbed two further organizations, the Farmers Life Insurance Association, in 1931, and the United Danish Society of America in 1945.

As of January 1, 1923 this incarnation of the Beavers had 9,626 members in 244 lodges spread across Wisconsin, Illinois and Florida and was headquartered in its own building in Madison, Wisconsin It had 80,000 members in 1979. The group had 60,000 members in 1994. Though it no longer has the Beavers appellation, or the ritual, its local lodges were still known as "Colonies" in the mid-1990s. It remains headquartered in Madison, Wisconsin.

== Fraternal Order of Beavers ==
The Fraternal Order of Beavers was founded in 1911 and reorganized in 1919. This order admitted all men who believed in a Supreme Being, ages eighteen and older, but otherwise did not question candidates religious, political or national background. This Order had 12,000 members in 53 lodges in the early 1920s, and was headquartered at the Liberty Building in Philadelphia.

The Fraternal Order of Beavers' ritual was centered around the beavers of the Valley of Turquemanau and their conflict with the Iroquois and involved the candidate being taken as an "Algonquian captive" "through the rapids in a canoe to Ahmeek, King of all Beavers."

Most benefits and activities were administered on the local level and included building and loan associations, employment bureau, contingency funds for members in distress, bands and degree teams. Funeral benefits were handled by the "Funeral Benefit Association of Beavers lodges only", which was apparently the same organization as the Beavers Benefit Association, also located in the Liberty Building. This was founded in 1919 and had 6,000 members in 32 lodges in the early 1920s.

== North American Order of the Beaver ==
The North American Order of the Beaver was founded as a Masonic body in 1990.
