= Lompoc Valley Flower Festival =

Annual flower festival in California

Coordinates: 34.6388°N 120.4670°W

- Genre: Community flower festival, parade, royalty program
- Dates: 1952-2019, 2022-present
- Locations: Lompoc, Santa Barbara County, California
- Years active: 61
- Website: Lompoc Valley Flower Festival

The Lompoc Valley Flower Festival is an annual flower festival held in the city of Lompoc, located northern Santa Barbara County, California.

The event is organized and coordinated by The Lompoc Valley Festival Association, and is held annually at Ryon Memorial Park, for 5 days from Wednesday to Sunday on the last full weekend in June.

The Flower Festival started in 1952 and is named after the commercial flower fields that used to be plentiful around the city and Lompoc Valley. The festival features a carnival, live entertainment, food, arts and crafts, and a commercial flower center. The event includes the crowning of a Flower Festival Queen, and the Flower Festival Parade on Saturday morning.

== History ==
The Lompoc Valley Flower Festival was established in 1952, at first not as a flower festival but as an annual rodeo and parade. The original event grew until one of Lompoc's leading citizens at the time, George Miller, began championing for the Flower Festival. Miller persuaded Lompoc's Chamber of Commerce to change from the rodeo and parade event, reasoning "that while more than 200 California communities staged rodeos each year, large and small, Lompoc had its world famous flower fields, an asset that was unique and the perfect basis for the community event".

The flower festival was developed around The Alpha Clubs Flower Show, which had previously been going since 1922. It started out as a 2-day event, but has grown over the years to a 5-day event. Nowadays, the biggest part of the festival is the parade.

The festival was cancelled in 2020 and 2021 due to effects of the COVID-19 pandemic.

== Parade ==
The Flower Festival Parade occurs annually on the Saturday morning of the festival. It starts in downtown, travels through town, and concludes at the festival's site in Ryon Memorial Park, . The parade's route follows "H" Street and Ocean Avenue. Each float is required to be constructed of flowers and/or natural materials.
