= Julian Beever =

British sidewalk chalk artist

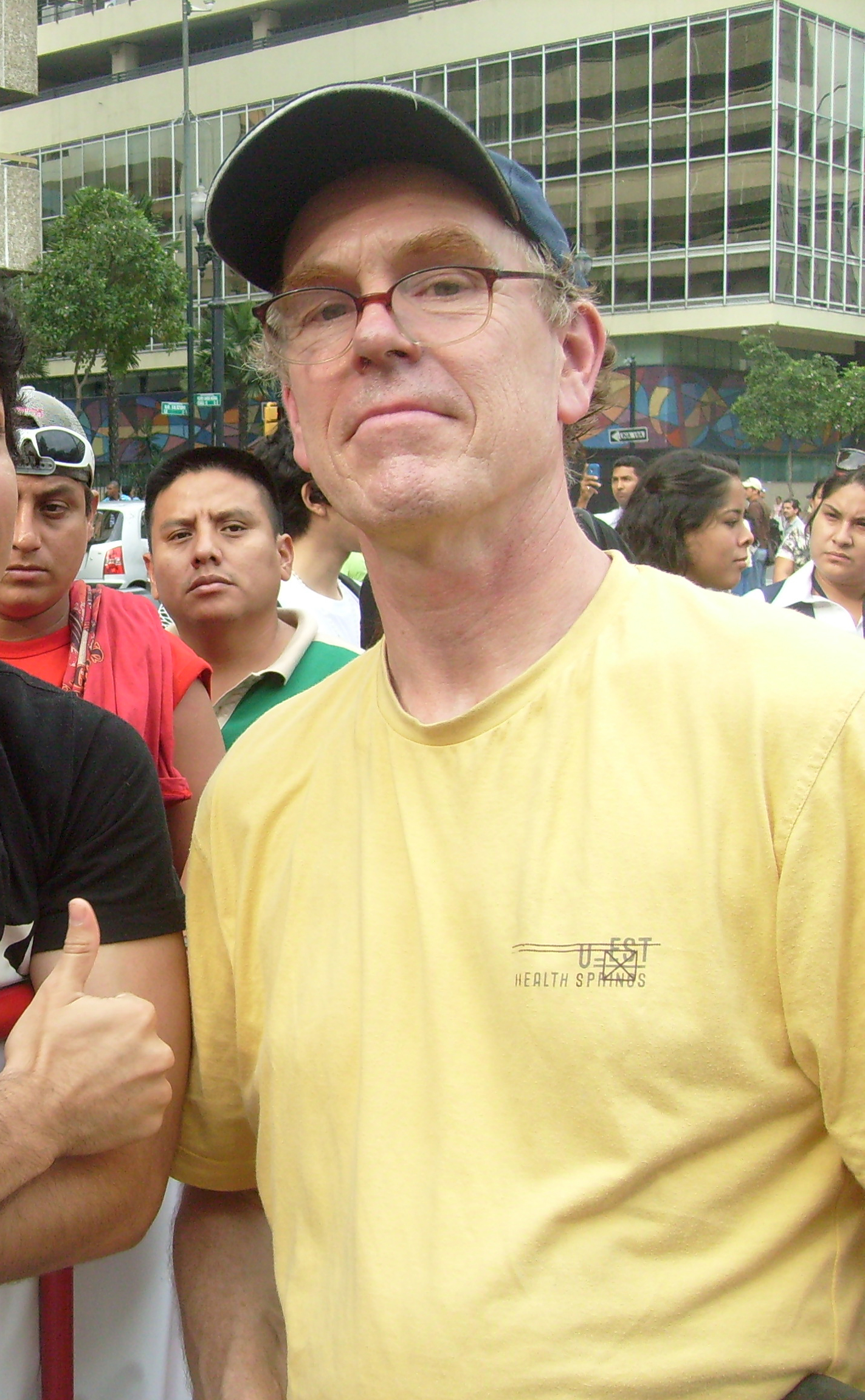
- Julian Beever in 2011
- Known for: Anamorphic trompe-l'œil chalk drawings on pavement
- Website: www.julianbeever.net

Julian Beever (born c. 1959) is a British sidewalk chalk artist who has been creating trompe-l'œil chalk drawings on pavement surfaces since the mid-1990s. He uses a projection technique called anamorphosis to create the illusion of three dimensions when viewed from the correct angle. He preserves his work in photographs, often positioning a person within the image as if they were interacting with the scene.

== Biography ==
Beever grew up in Melton, Leicestershire, near the geographical centre of England. His talent in drawing had emerged by the time he was 5 years old; he liked school, especially his art classes(optical illusion).

At the age of 18, he chose to study art, design, and psychology (as a last-minute substitute for English). He continued to excel in art, found design to be tedious, and discovered new insights into visual perception, depth perception, and the eye and brain in his psychology studies. After a gap year working as a laborer and carpet-layer's assistant, Beever enrolled in a Foundation Art course at Leicester Polytechnic, where he enjoyed experimenting with a variety of modern art forms.

He started a three-year course of study for a BA in Fine Arts at Leeds Polytechnic, but found the larger school and its self-consciously avant-garde atmosphere mean and unsympathetic. When placed on academic probation, Beever decided to focus on traditional techniques, developing meticulous skills in portraying water surfaces. He later has said that in three years of college, he learned little that could not have acquired on his own, but he did pick up skills in pastel crayons that would become key to his later career.

A chance encounter at the 1983 Stonehenge Free Festival with a juggler inspired Beever to take up the skill a few months before his graduation. Overcoming his introversion and shyness, he learned from other jugglers how to flourish as a street performer. He then decided to combine performance with his artistic skills by building and operating a portable "Punch and Judy" puppet theater, but eventually found the repetitious performances to be boring. He observed street artists at work, and realised that he could use his strengths in drawing, and tour freely carrying only a box of sidewalk chalk instead of a bulky booth and puppets. He had always wanted to travel, and found that he could finance overseas trips by working as a freelance pavement artist.

Beever learned how to pick locations and images that would earn him good tips from delighted onlookers. He found a favourite spot in Brussels, Belgium, where he did crowd-pleasing renditions of the Mona Lisa, the Belgian royal family, and the famous Manneken Pis statue. It was there that he made his artistic breakthrough with Swimming pool in the high street, his first major anamorphic work.

== Artwork ==
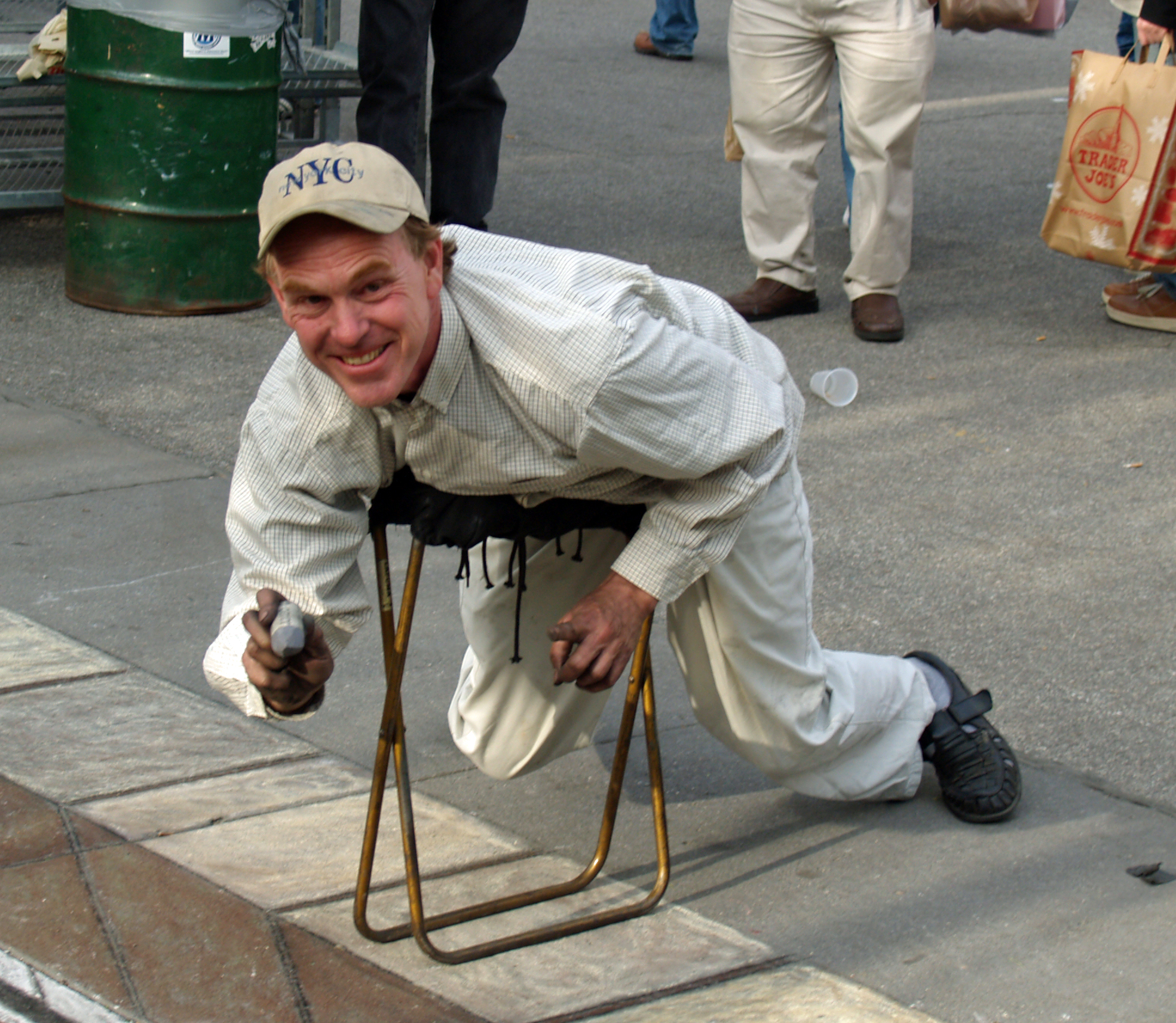
Beever at work in Union Square, Manhattan (2007)

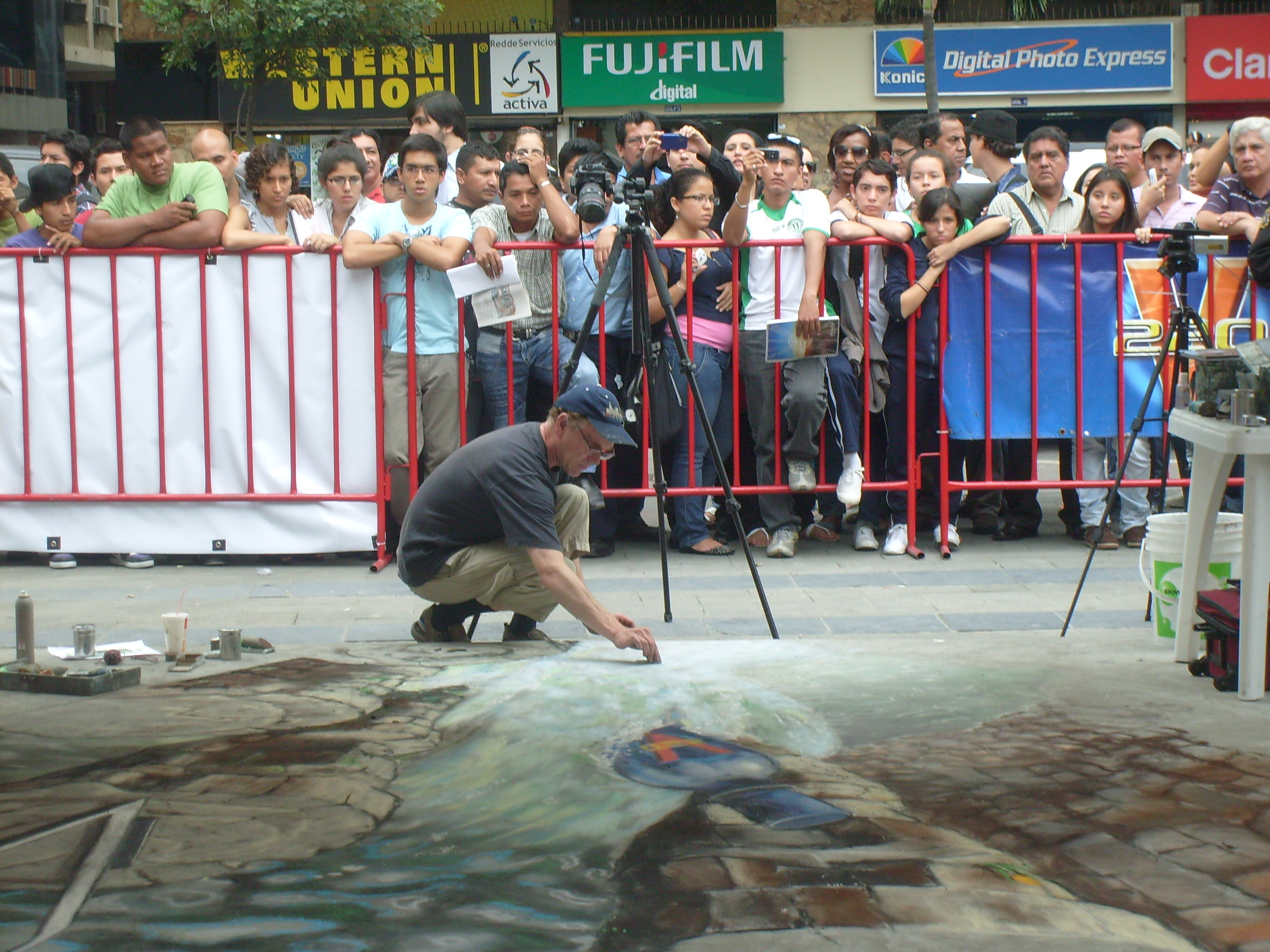
Beever in Guayaquil, Ecuador

Beever begins by sketching his concepts on paper. Once the image is finalised, a camera is placed at the intended location from which the artwork is expected to be viewed. From this time onwards, Beever evaluates his work in progress only through the fixed lens of his camera. He observes the classic rules of perspective, occasionally placing a short piece of rope in the scene to evaluate the curve of a line.

He carefully selects suitable surfaces to hold his art. He has written: "Good quality pastels used on a good cement or stone surface can give an effect second to none – better than on paper".

Once the artwork is completed, Beever takes multiple photographs to document and preserve his work, often posing himself or other people within the scene to reinforce the visual effect. When he plans to use a wide-angle lens to take a picture from a closer distance, his drawing must be carefully predistorted to compensate for the lens distortion.

Beever works internationally as a freelance artist, creating commissioned murals for companies and institutions, and producing hundreds of works across Europe, the US, and Australia.

Besides his pavement art, Beever also paints murals with acrylic paints and replicas of the works of masters and oil paintings, and creates collages. Among his other work are drawings, usually themed around music.

In 2010, Beever released Pavement Chalk Artist, a book which includes photographs of many of his works from around the world.

== See also ==
- Anamorphosis
- Kurt Wenner – sidewalk artist who also uses anamorphosis
