= Pasadena Chalk Festival =

Annual street painting event in Pasadena, California

Coordinates: 34.145630°N 118.144025°W

- Status: Active
- Genre: Festival
- Frequency: Annually
- Location: Pasadena, California
- Country: USA
- Founded: 1993
- Most recent: 14–15 June 2025
- Website: http://www.pasadenachalkfestival.org/

The Pasadena Chalk Festival is an American cultural event of street painting. It was founded by the Light Bringer Project in 1993. During this festival, artists create temporary masterpieces in chalk on the streets, including original works, masterpiece recreations, movie posters and iconic scenes recreations, 3D realistic works, animation art, modern abstractions, and more. The festival is held annually in downtown within the Paseo Pasadena, California. In 2010, the Pasadena Chalk Festival was officially named the Largest Display of Chalk Pavement Art by Guinness World Records, and attracted more than 600 artists and 100,000 visitors in one weekend. Here artist can be seen in a wide range of all ages expressing there different levels of skill and appreciations for the show.

The 2020 festival was held virtually due to the COVID-19 pandemic.
