= William T. Beaver =

American medical researcher and educator (1933–2020)

William Thomas Beaver (January 27, 1933 – November 12, 2020) was an American medical researcher and educator who was a professor at Georgetown University. He is best known for his role in drafting the first versions of the rules governing clinical studies in the United States, and for his research into medical usage of painkilling drugs.

== Education and career ==
Beaver was born in Albany, New York, on January 27, 1933. He received an undergraduate degree from Princeton University in 1954. He went on to the Cornell University medical school for his MD, which he completed in 1958.

After a few years as an instructor and assistant professor at Cornell, Beaver moved to the Washington, D.C. area in 1968, where he began work at Georgetown University as an associate professor of pharmacology and anesthesiology. He remained at Georgetown through his career, and upon his retirement in 1997, was given the title of professor emeritus.

== Work ==
Beaver is known for his research during the 1970s on the clinical use of painkillers, which helped to establish evidence-based guidelines for the use of painkillers in treatment of post-surgical and chronic pain.

While a clinical pharmacologist at Georgetown University, Beaver created the first version of the rules governing "adequate and controlled" clinical studies.

== Death ==
Beaver died from complications of COVID-19 at a care facility in Leesburg, Virginia, on November 12, 2020. He was 87.
