= Beavers (surname) =

Beavers is a surname. Notable people with the surname include:

- Anthony Beavers (born 1963), American philosopher
- Aubrey Beavers (born 1971), American football player
- Brett Beavers, American songwriter
- Clarence Beavers (1921–2017), American army officer
- Darrian Beavers (born 1999), American football player
- Dylan Beavers (born 2001), American baseball player
- Eric Beavers (born 1964), American football player
- Ethen Beavers, American comic book artist
- Gavin Beavers (born 2005), American soccer player
- George A. Beavers Jr. (1891–1989), American corporate executive
- Gina Beavers (born 1974), American artist
- Jackey Beavers (1937–2008), American singer
- Jessie Mae Brown Beavers (1923–1989), American journalist
- Jim Beavers, American songwriter
- Keith Beavers (born 1983), Canadian swimmer
- Larry Beavers (born 1985), American football player
- Lorraine Beavers, British politician
- Louise Beavers (1900–1962), American actress
- Mae Beavers (born 1947), American politician
- Paul Beavers (born 1978), English footballer
- Robert Beavers (born 1949), American film director
- Roberta Beavers (born 1942), American politician
- Scott Beavers (born 1967), American football player
- William Beavers (1935–2024), American politician
- Willie Beavers (born 1993), American football player
