= Gorda, California =

Unincorporated community in California, United States

Gorda
- Unincorporated community
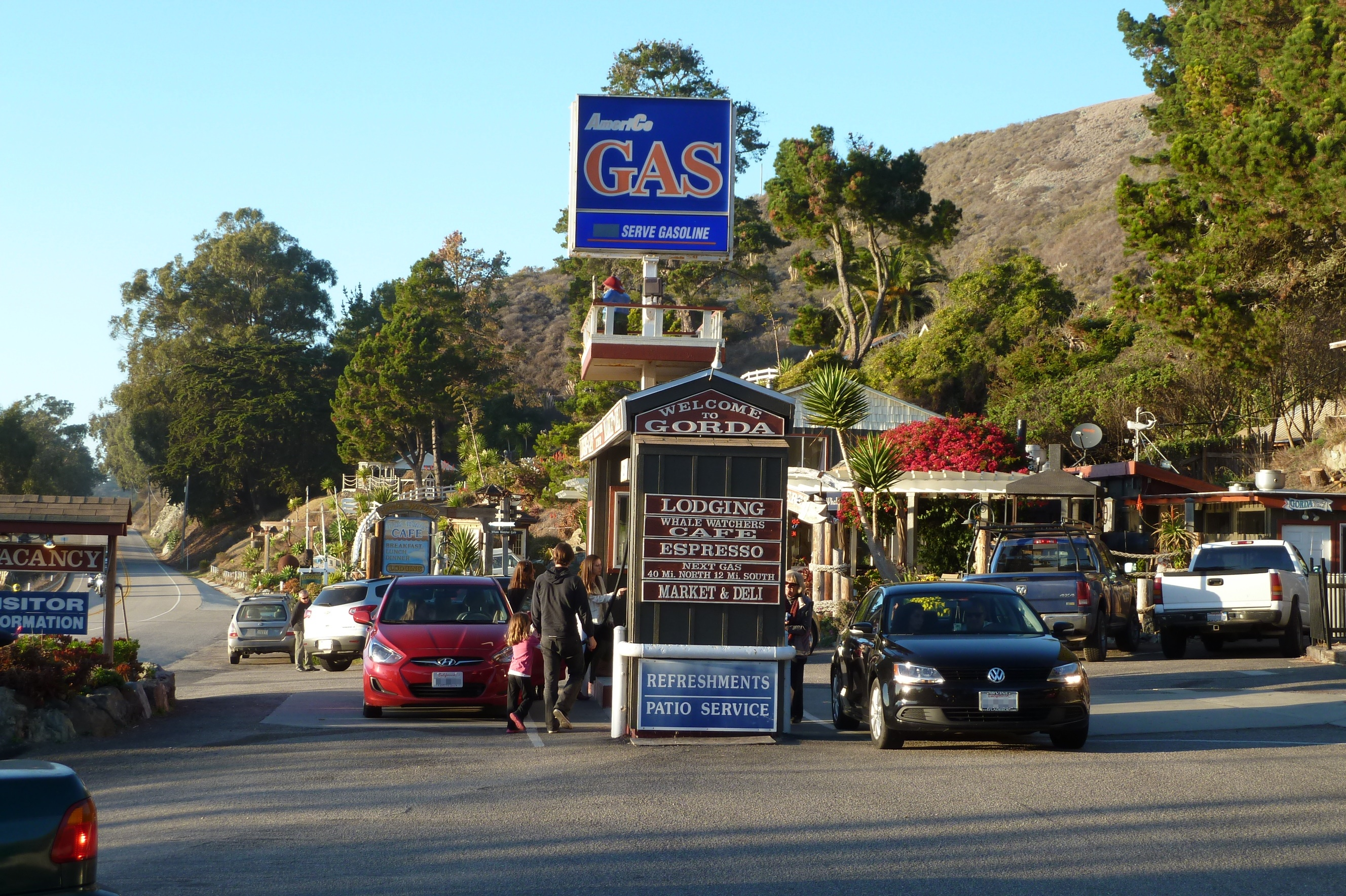
- Gorda, California.

- Location in California
- Coordinates: 35°52′35″N 121°26′46″W
- Country: United States
- State: California
- County: Monterey
- Elevation: 148 ft (45 m)
- ZIP code: 93920
- Area code: 805
- GNIS feature ID: 271364

Gorda (Spanish for "Fat") is a hamlet in Monterey County, California, United States. It is located 3 mi (4.8 km) south of Cape San Martin, at an elevation of 148 ft (45 m). It is one of the three small settlements of filling stations, restaurants, and motels located along State Route 1 on the Big Sur coast. The ZIP Code is 93920, but mail must be addressed to Big Sur, and the community is served by area code 805.

== History ==
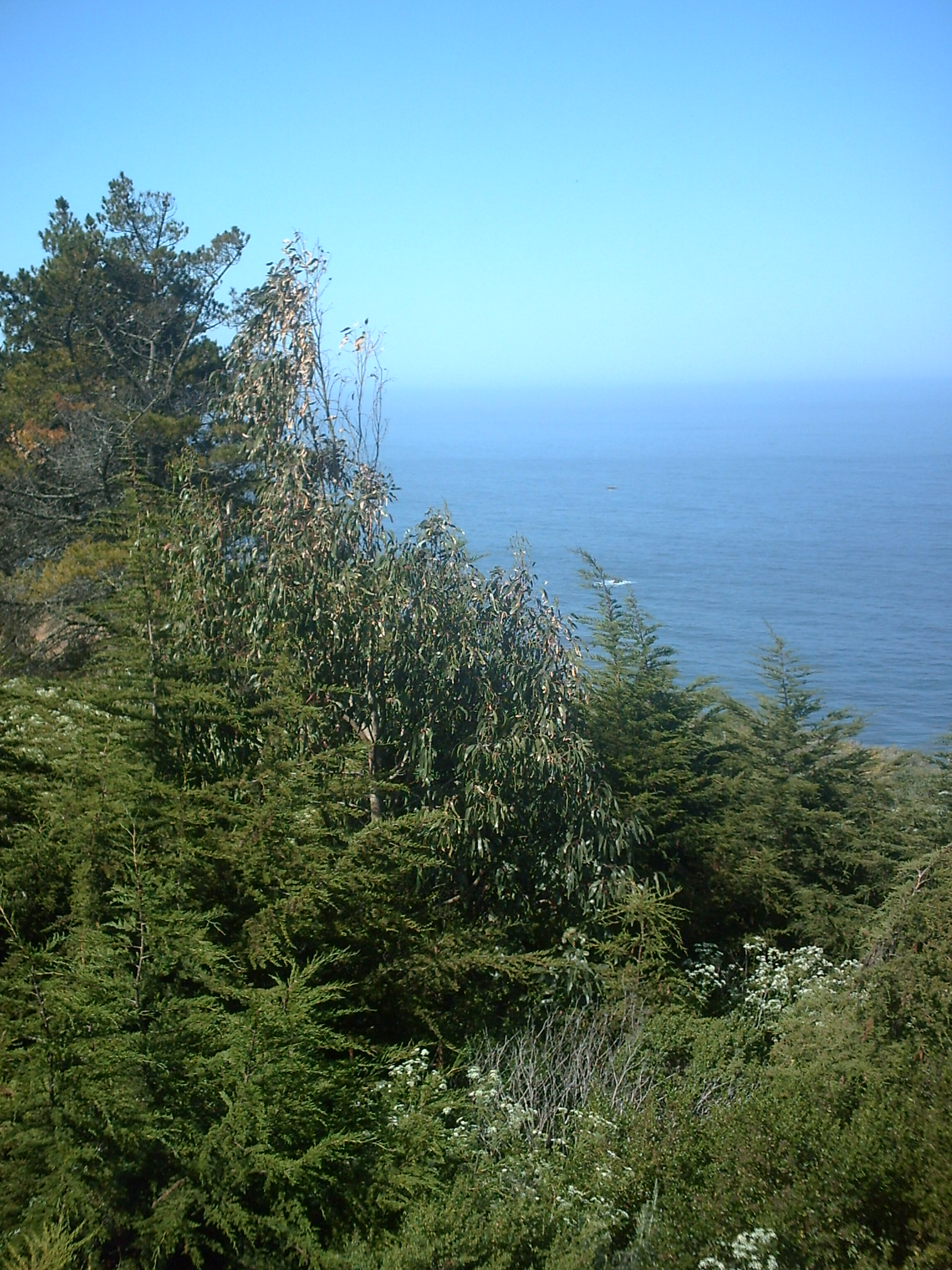
View of Pacific Ocean at Gorda, California.

The fresh springs in Gorda were used by Native American tribes. By the time the first Europeans arrived in 1878, the Native Americans were no longer present. The settlement expanded with the gold rush in nearby Manchester during the 1880s. A stagecoach stop was built and a post office operated at Gorda from 1893 to 1923, moving in 1910.

Gorda was the location of a hippie commune from 1962 to 1968 on land owned by Amelia Newell.

== Services ==
Roland H. Chivers was a heavy equipment mechanic and operator. He graded the site for the restaurant and made numerous improvement to the coastal property.

Road-side services include a small hotel and cottages, restaurant, gas station, deli, espresso bar, and convenience store. In 1979, the town attracted national attention after most of the land was purchased by Kidco Limited Ventures, a corporation owned by four minor children from Ramona, California who were heirs of the family that owned the Cessna Aircraft company. After funding the company, $500,000 was invested as a tax shelter to purchase the town's land. At the time, Dickie Cessna was 14 years old and the other three siblings were June (16), Bette (13) and Nene (11).

== Mud Creek slide ==
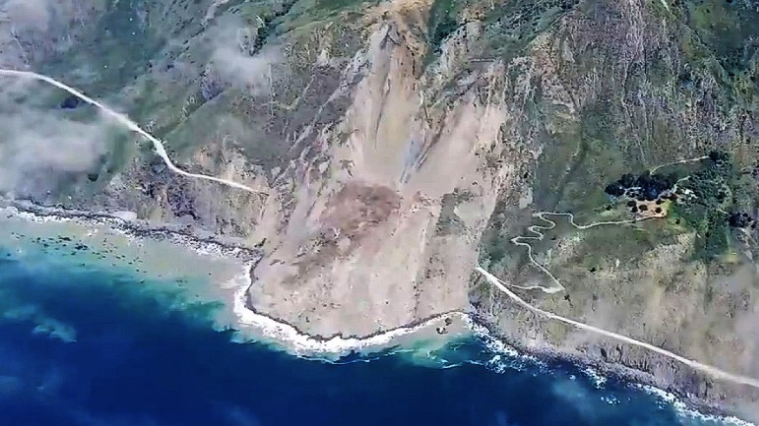
The May 22, 2017, mud slide at Mud Creek covered Highway 1 for more than a quarter-mile.

On May 20, 2017, the largest slide in the Big Sur Coast Highway's history at Mud Creek buried more than a quarter-mile of Highway 1 1 mile (1.6 km) southeast of Gorda. The highway was closed for more than a year. This had a considerable negative economic impact for tourism between Monterey and Morro Bay. A CalTrans study concluded that rerouting the highway around the slide was preferred over other alternatives. The only route in and out of Gorda beginning in the south was via a lengthy detour over the narrow, winding Nacimiento-Fergusson Road. On August 2, 2017, CalTrans decided to rebuild the highway over the slide instead of clearing it. It was reopened on July 18, 2018, at a cost of $54 million.

== Etymology ==
Gorda is derived from the Spanish word for "fat" or "well-fed".

== High fuel prices ==
Gorda is occasionally mentioned as having the highest gasoline prices in the United States. This is due in part to the cost of a diesel generator that provides electricity to the gas station and town. It's also due to the limited availability of fuel in the area and the distance from suppliers, who must deliver fuel to Gorda from as far as Santa Maria and Paso Robles, from 80 to 100 miles (130 to 160 km) away. In 2008, the price was $6.70 per gallon. In October 2021, the prices were $7.59 for unleaded and $8.49 for premium gas. As of April 2026, gas prices rose to $9.39 for unleaded and $9.99 for premium.

== Geography ==
Under the Köppen climate classification, "dry-summer subtropical" climates are often referred to as "Mediterranean". This climate zone has an average temperature above 10 °C (50 °F) in their warmest months, and an average in the coldest between 18 and −3 °C (64 and 27 °F). Summers tend to be dry with less than one-third the rainfall of the wettest winter month, and with less than 30 mm (1 in) of precipitation in a summer month.

=== Climate ===
Climate data for Gorda, CA
Month	Jan	Feb	Mar	Apr	May	Jun	Jul	Aug	Sep	Oct	Nov	Dec	Year
Record high °F (°C)	81 (27)	85 (29)	87 (31)	98 (37)	96 (36)	102 (39)	99 (37)	101 (38)	100 (38)	100 (38)	90 (32)	75 (24)	102 (39)
Mean daily maximum °F (°C)	59.7 (15.4)	61.5 (16.4)	63.4 (17.4)	68.3 (20.2)	72.6 (22.6)	75.9 (24.4)	75.6 (24.2)	77.3 (25.2)	77.1 (25.1)	73.2 (22.9)	64.5 (18.1)	59.9 (15.5)	69.1 (20.6)
Mean daily minimum °F (°C)	42.9 (6.1)	43.1 (6.2)	43.4 (6.3)	43.5 (6.4)	45.8 (7.7)	48.3 (9.1)	50.4 (10.2)	50.0 (10.0)	50.3 (10.2)	47.9 (8.8)	44.9 (7.2)	41.9 (5.5)	46.0 (7.8)
Record low °F (°C)	27 (−3)	29 (−2)	27 (−3)	30 (−1)	35 (2)	37 (3)	41 (5)	40 (4)	39 (4)	36 (2)	28 (−2)	27 (−3)	27 (−3)
Average precipitation inches (mm)	9.10 (231)	8.65 (220)	6.49 (165)	3.11 (79)	1.09 (28)	0.24 (6.1)	0.03 (0.76)	0.05 (1.3)	0.42 (11)	2.03 (52)	4.85 (123)	7.62 (194)	43.70 (1,110)
Average precipitation days (≥ 0.01 in)	10.3	11.2	10.3	6.5	3.7	1.1	0.3	0.4	1.3	3.5	7.5	10.3	66.4
Source: NOAA

== Government ==
At the county level, Gorda is represented on the Monterey County Board of Supervisors by Supervisor Dave Potter.

In the California State Legislature, Gorda is in the 17th senatorial district, represented by Democrat John Laird, and in the 30th Assembly district, represented by Democrat Dawn Addis.

In the United States House of Representatives, Gorda is in California's 20th congressional district, represented by Republican Vince Fong.
