= Skyline Trail (Jasper National Park) =

Hiking trail in Alberta, Canada

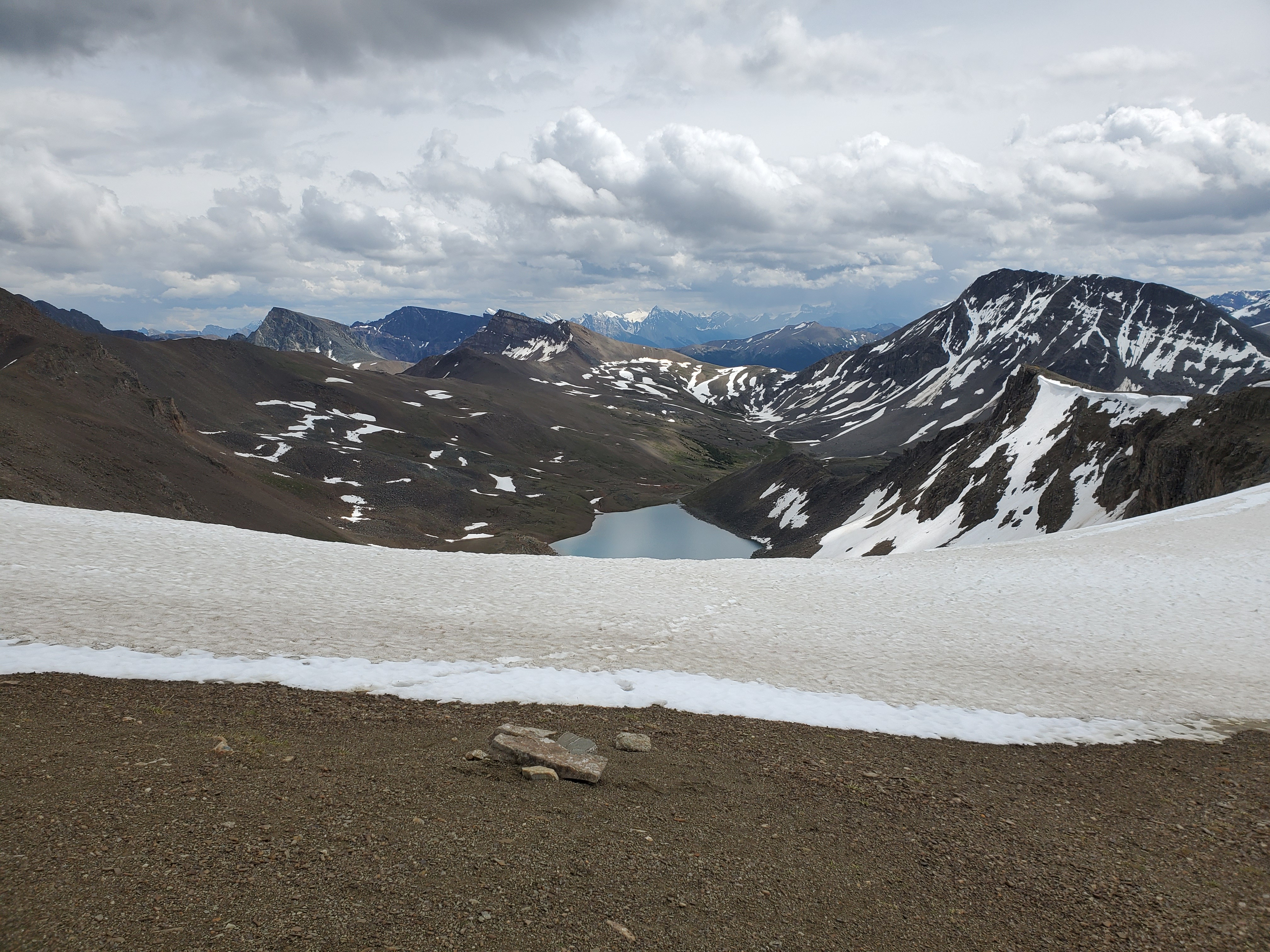
- View from the Notch, looking ESE
- Length: 44.1 km (27 mi)
- Location: Jasper National Park, Alberta, Canada
- Trailheads: Maligne Lake; Maligne Canyon
- Use: Hiking
- Elevation gain/loss: 1,410 m (4,626 ft)
- Highest point: The Notch (2,511 m (8,238 ft))
- Difficulty: Intermediate (1–3-day hike)
- Surface: Natural
- Maintainer: Parks Canada Agency

The Skyline Trail is a hiking trail in Jasper National Park, Alberta, Canada. It is recognized as one of the best backpacking trails in the Canadian Rockies, and it is one of the most popular in Jasper National Park. With nearly 25 kilometres (16 mi) of the total 44.1 kilometres (27.4 mi) above tree line, the Skyline has views of the surrounding mountain ranges and valleys. In addition to wide vistas, the trail passes through wildflower meadows and offers opportunities for wildlife viewing.

== History ==
Parts of the Skyline trail around Big Shovel Pass, as well as the approximate location of the Curator access trail (#101) date to 1911. The Canadian government hired local outfitters Bruce and Jack Otto to cut a trail in preparation for Mary Schäffer Warren's survey of Maligne Lake. It was during that trip that the name Shovel Pass (as well as many mountains and other features in the area) were named.

A mile from the summit, where the last, hard ascent began, Jack [Otto] rather excitedly called our attention to two tiny specks on the sky-line and though he remained sweetly non-committal, and suggested they might be a horse or two men, we knew he meant "sheep," and sheep they promptly became.

In places we found a partially dug-out trail, a trail the men ahead had shoveled out a few days before, and took to it as well as we could. Then—we came close enough to analyze our two immovable sheep only to find them a pair of abandoned shovels which had been hewn from a tree, and in case we needed the same, left standing conspicuously in the snow.

Laughingly naming the pass 'Shovel Pass,' we went on our way down the heather and snow-decked slopes.

In 1921, guide and outfitter Fred Brewster relocated one of his Rocky Mountain Camps further up the Curator trail, creating Shovel Pass Lodge. Brewster's outfit regularly guided horseback and ski trips to Maligne Lake by this route, which includes the southern half of the Skyline Trail. Looking for a more scenic and direct route to Jasper Park Lodge, Brewster began work on what is now the northern half of the Skyline Trail, completing it in 1937. Originally, only the new stretch of trail immediately north of the Notch was referred to as the "Sky Line" trail. The Parks Branch of the government began trail improvements and maintenance on the route in 1940.

== Route ==
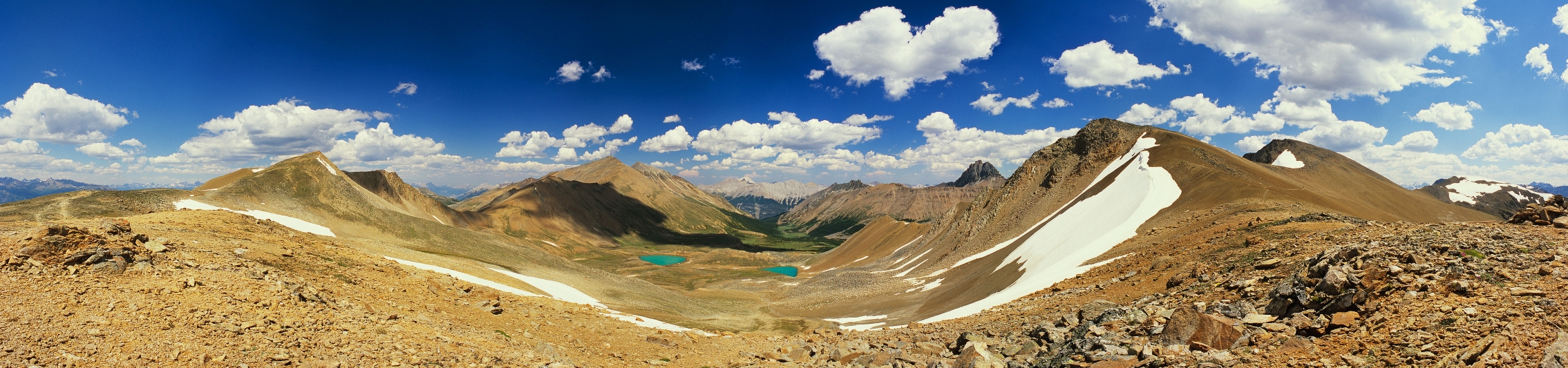
The trail runs roughly north–south and can be seen on the left and right sides of the panorama.

The trail is most commonly hiked in two or three days from Maligne Lake to the bottom of Signal Mountain, but it may be done at a slower pace, or alternatively, the entire trail can be completed in one day. It crosses three passes and includes the highest section of trail in Jasper National Park. It also forms part of Section E of the Great Divide Trail.

Hiking the trail northbound requires less elevation gain, as the south trailhead at Maligne Lake (elevation 1,690 metres (5,540 ft)) is higher than Signal trailhead at the north end (elevation 1,160 metres (3,810 ft)). There are four official trails intersecting the Skyline Trail (#100) that provide alternate access. From south to north, these are the Bald Hills Shortcut (#23a) at kilometer 4.8, Watchtower (#102) at kilometer 18, Curator (#101, but more commonly known as Wabasso) at kilometer 20.6, and Signal Downhill (#7i; unofficially called Loni's) at kilometer 39.9.

The south trailhead is located at the northwest end of Maligne Lake. The trail ascends gradually through montane forest for 4.8 kilometres (3.0 mi) past Mona and Loraine Lakes, to Evelyn Creek Campground. The grade increases for the next 5.5 kilometres (3.4 mi), passing Little Shovel Campground and reaching tree line near Little Shovel Pass (2,240 metres (7,350 ft)). The trail descends slightly into the Snowbowl, a large cirque known for its alpine wildflowers, which bloom in the first few weeks following snow melt, usually in early July. The area contains Snowbowl Campground at kilometer 12.2 of the trail, and a winter-only ski cabin called Shangrila, built in the 1930s and now maintained by the Maligne Lake Ski Club. A 1928 publication from the Department of the Interior describes the area:

Winding up through a charming alpine valley the trail reaches a high alpland known as the Little Shovel Pass. In early summer this is a perfect garden of wildflowers, blossoms of every hue mingling in brilliant profusion. The neighbouring cliffs are a favourite haunt of sheep and goat.

North of Snowbowl Campground, the trail ascends out of the cirque to crest Big Shovel Pass (2,320 metres (7,610 ft)), providing views of the Wabasso valley, Curator Lake, and the Notch. The Skyline Trail continues down to Curator; going over the col to the northeast leads to the Watchtower Trail, which exits to Maligne Lake Road just north of Medicine Lake. The Curator Trail junction, just before Curator Lake, at kilometer 19.5, provides access to Curator Campground by descending for 0.8 kilometres (0.50 mi) to get below tree line. Continuing a short distance further down the Curator trail, hikers will reach Shovel Pass Lodge. Curator trail eventually reaches Wabasso Lake and the Icefield Parkway.

From Curator junction, the Skyline Trail ascends its steepest grade, gaining 300 metres (980 ft) on loose footing to the Notch (2,510 metres (8,230 ft)). This pass often has a large cornice well into August, forcing hikers to detour slightly north and walk through snow. Once up, the trail continues northwest for nearly 3 kilometres (1.9 mi) along a ridge just below Amber Mountain's summit. On clear days, this ridge offers views as far as Mount Robson, approximately 90 kilometres (56 mi) away. The Skyline Trail switches back north off the ridge and follows a stream down the valley to Tekarra Campground, at kilometer 30.4.

Immediately north of Tekarra Campground, hikers ford the stream and contour around the shoulder of Signal Mountain, before reentering the forest near Signal Campground. The trail uses a former fire road to descend 850 metres (2,790 ft) over 8.4 kilometres (5.2 mi) to the Signal trailhead, on Maligne Lake Road. Alternately, approximately halfway down the fire road, a mountain biking and hiking trail (#7i) descends more steeply to the north to connect with the front country trail network around Lakes Edith, Mildred, Beauvert, Trefoil, and Annette to reach destinations such as the Signal Trailhead or the Town of Jasper.

== Amenities ==
The Skyline Trail is designated by Jasper National Park as High Priority, which means that it should receive regular inspections and repairs as soon as issues are reported. Fires are not allowed along the trail. Camping is only permitted with reservations at the designated campgrounds, and dogs are not allowed except for the short section north of Signal Campground. The park maintains six campgrounds along the route, which provide tent pads, picnic tables, bear lockers, and open-air barrel or pit toilets:

Campground	Distance from Maligne Lake Trailhead	Distance from Signal Trailhead	Elevation	Tent pads
Evelyn Creek	4.8 kilometres (3.0 mi)	39.3 kilometres (24.4 mi)	1,824 metres (5,984 ft)	4
Little Shovel	8.3 kilometres (5.2 mi)	35.8 kilometres (22.2 mi)	2,233 metres (7,326 ft)	8
Snowbowl	12.2 kilometres (7.6 mi)	31.9 kilometres (19.8 mi)	2,094 metres (6,870 ft)	8
Curator	20.3 kilometres (12.6 mi)	23.8 kilometres (14.8 mi)	2,070 metres (6,790 ft)	8
Tekarra	30.4 kilometres (18.9 mi)	13.7 kilometres (8.5 mi)	2,062 metres (6,765 ft)	8
Signal	35.7 kilometres (22.2 mi)	8.4 kilometres (5.2 mi)	2,014 metres (6,608 ft)	8

An additional campground, Watchtower, is located a little over 3 kilometres (1.9 mi) off-trail from Big Shovel Pass. The Watchtower trail and campground have a lower trail priority and receive less maintenance.

Shovel Pass Lodge is located near the mid-point of the trail, a little less than 1 kilometre (0.62 mi) down the Curator trail. It offers meals in a shared dining room, outhouses, and seven heated cabins with beds.

Water sources along the trail consist of streams and small lakes; all campgrounds are located near a stream.

== Wildlife ==
The general area through which the Skyline Trail passes is inhabited by a variety of animal species. These include the timber wolf, black bear, coyote, grizzly bear, moose, white-tailed deer, bighorn sheep, marten, pika, mountain goat, lynx, marmot, mule deer, porcupine, beaver, elk, wolverine, and cougar. Raptors that range across the area include golden eagles, great horned owls, and bald eagles.
