= Evelyn Peak =

Mountain peak in Jasper NP, Alberta, Canada

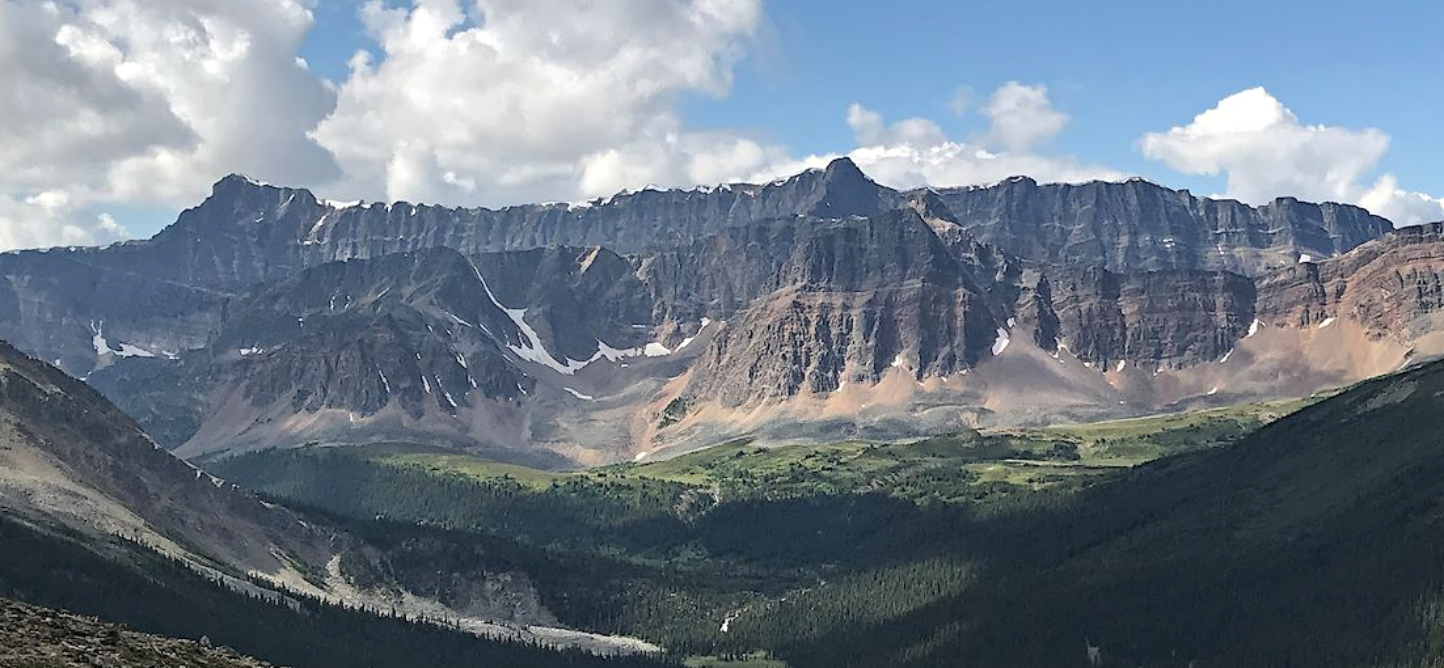
- Evelyn Peak seen from the Bald Hills

Highest point
- Elevation: 2,855 m (9,367 ft)
- Prominence: 435 m (1,427 ft)
- Parent peak: Mount Kerkeslin (2984 m)
- Listing: Mountains of Alberta
- Coordinates: 52°40′18″N 117°45′43″W

Geography
- Location within Alberta Location within Canada
- Country: Canada
- Province: Alberta
- Protected area: Jasper National Park
- Parent range: Maligne Range; Canadian Rockies
- Topo map: NTS 83C12 Athabasca Falls

Geology
- Rock age: Cambrian
- Rock type: Sedimentary rock

Climbing
- Easiest route: Scramble

Evelyn Peak is a 2,855 m (9,367 ft) mountain summit in the Athabasca River valley of Jasper National Park, in the Canadian Rockies of Alberta, Canada. The nearest higher peak is Mount Kerkeslin, 5.0 km (3.1 mi) to the southwest, and Mount Hardisty is 6.0 km (3.7 mi) to the northwest. All three are part of the Maligne Range. Evelyn Peak is composed of sedimentary rock laid down during the Cambrian period and pushed east and over the top of younger rock during the Laramide orogeny. The mountain is at the headwaters of Evelyn Creek, and three kilometres south of Evelyn Pass. The creek and pass were named in 1921 for Evelyn Cavendish, Duchess of Devonshire (1870–1960), who visited nearby Maligne Lake in 1920. The mountain's name however, has not yet been officially adopted by the Geographical Names Board of Canada.

== Climate ==
Based on the Köppen climate classification, Evelyn Peak is in a subarctic climate zone with cold, snowy winters, and mild summers. Temperatures can drop below -20 °C with wind chill factors below -30 °C. Precipitation runoff from Evelyn Peak drains into the Athabasca River.

== Gallery ==
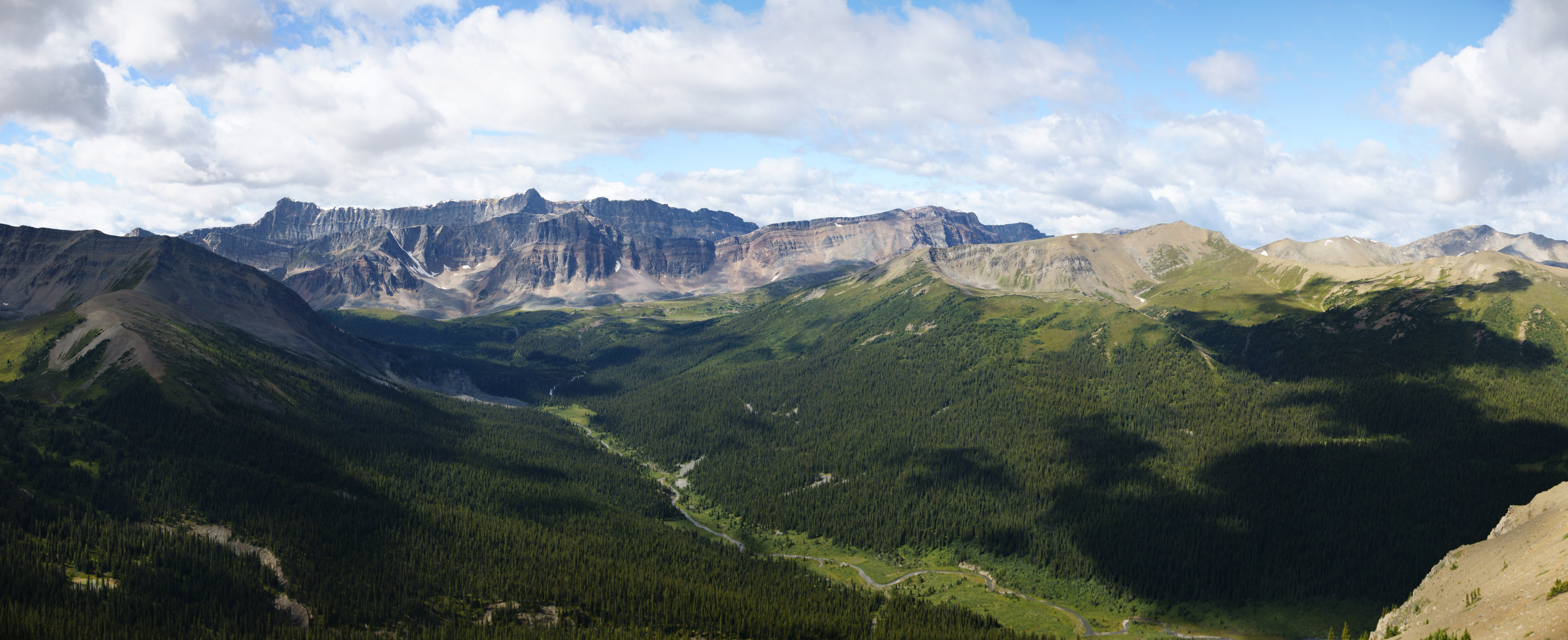
Looking up the Evelyn Creek valley to Evelyn Peak

== See also ==
- Geography of Alberta
