= Mount Tekarra =

Mountain in the country of Canada

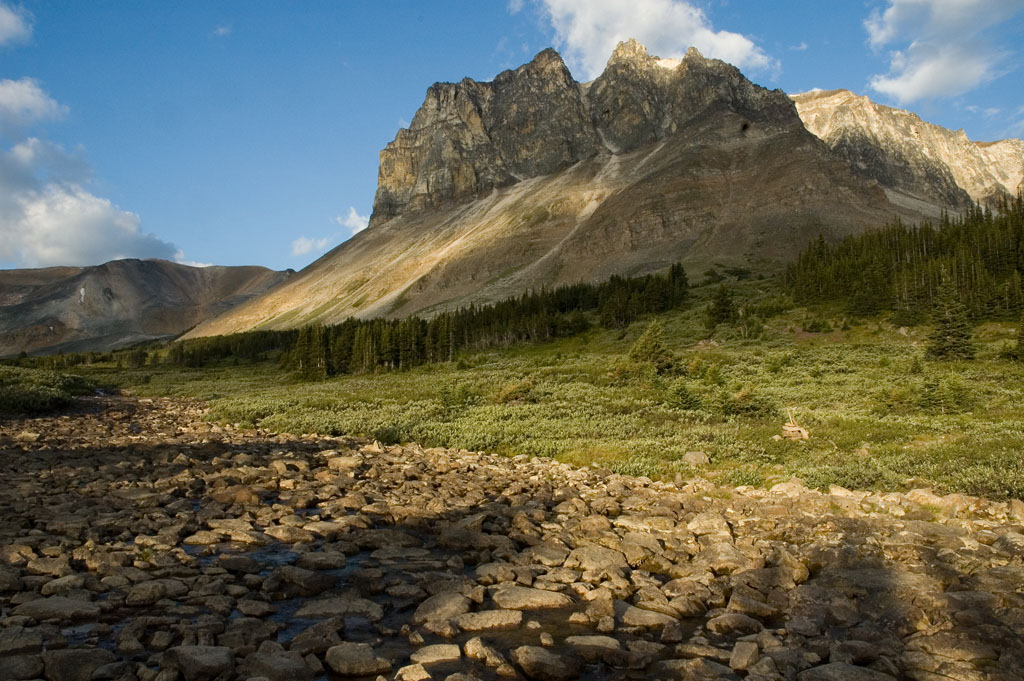
- Mount Tekarra

Highest point
- Elevation: 2,694 m (8,839 ft)
- Prominence: 279 m (915 ft)
- Parent peak: The Watchtower (2791 m)
- Listing: Mountains of Alberta
- Coordinates: 52°50′30″N 117°56′22″W

Geography
- Location within Alberta Location within Canada
- Interactive map of Mount Tekarra
- Country: Canada
- Province: Alberta
- Protected area: Jasper National Park
- Parent range: Maligne Range; Canadian Rockies
- Topo map: NTS 83C13 Medicine Lake

Geology
- Rock age: Cambrian
- Rock type: Sedimentary rock

Climbing
- First ascent: 1915 by Morrison Bridgland
- Easiest route: Scramble

Mount Tekarra is a 2,694-metre (8,839-foot) mountain summit located in the Athabasca River valley of Jasper National Park, in the Canadian Rockies of Alberta, Canada. It is situated at the northwest end of the Maligne Range and is visible from Jasper and the Icefields Parkway. The nearest higher neighbor is The Watchtower, 7.0 km (4.3 mi) to the east.

== History ==
The mountain was named by James Hector in 1859 for Tekarra, an Iroquois guide and hunter who accompanied Hector during his exploration of the Athabasca River during the Palliser Expedition.

The first ascent of Mount Tekarra was made in 1915 by Morrison P. Bridgland (1878-1948), a Dominion Land Surveyor who named many peaks in Jasper Park and the Canadian Rockies. The mountain's name was officially adopted in 1947 by the Geographical Names Board of Canada.

== Geology ==
Mount Tekarra is composed of sedimentary rock laid down during the Cambrian period and pushed east and over the top of younger rock during the Laramide orogeny.

== Climate ==
Based on the Köppen climate classification, Mount Tekarra is located in a subarctic climate zone with long, cold, snowy winters, and mild summers. Winter temperatures can drop below -20 °C with wind chill factors below -30 °C. Precipitation runoff from Mount Tekarra drains into the Maligne River and Tekarra Creek, both tributaries of the Athabasca River.

== Gallery ==
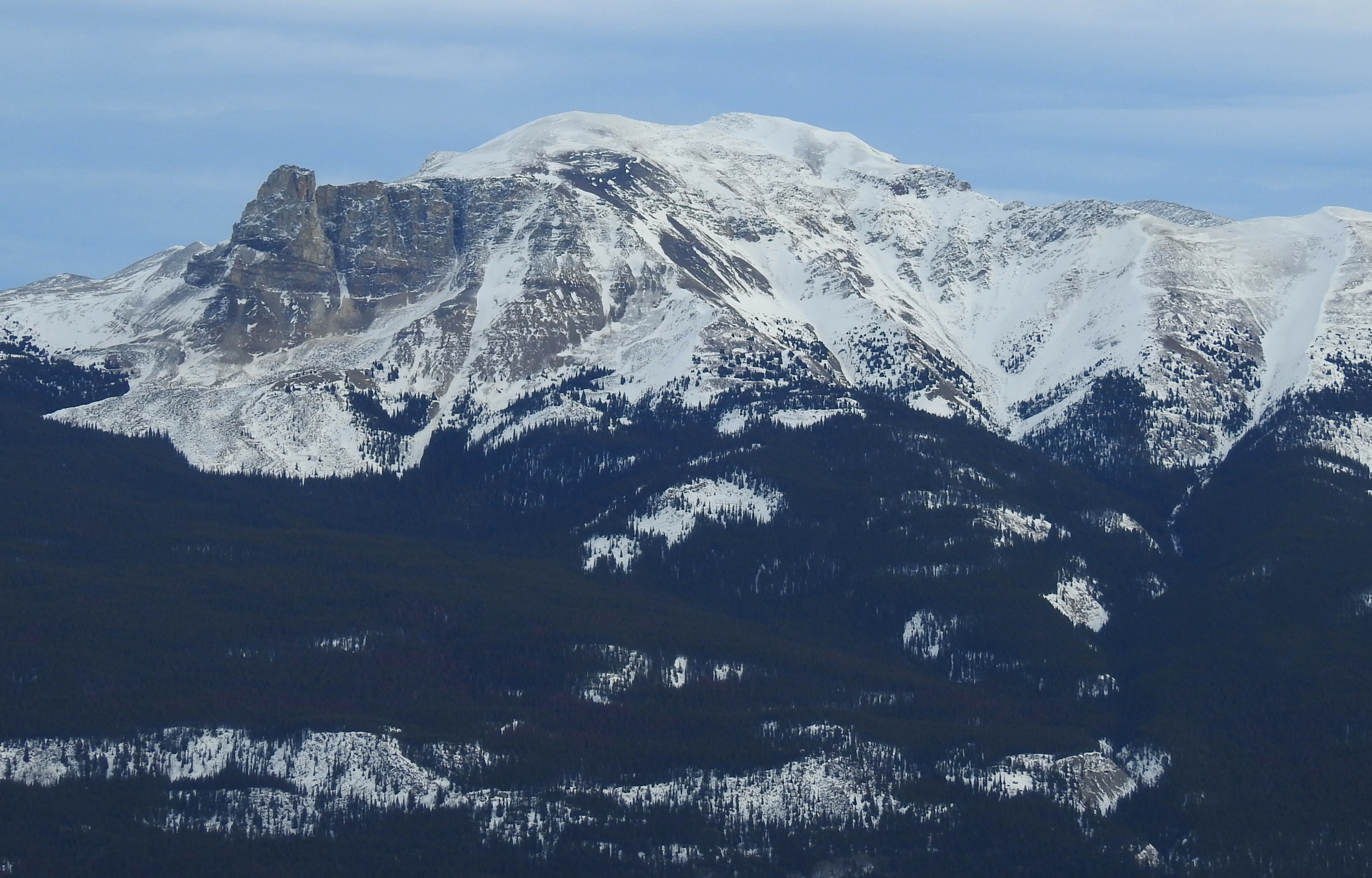
Mt. Tekarra from Marmot Basin Ski Resort

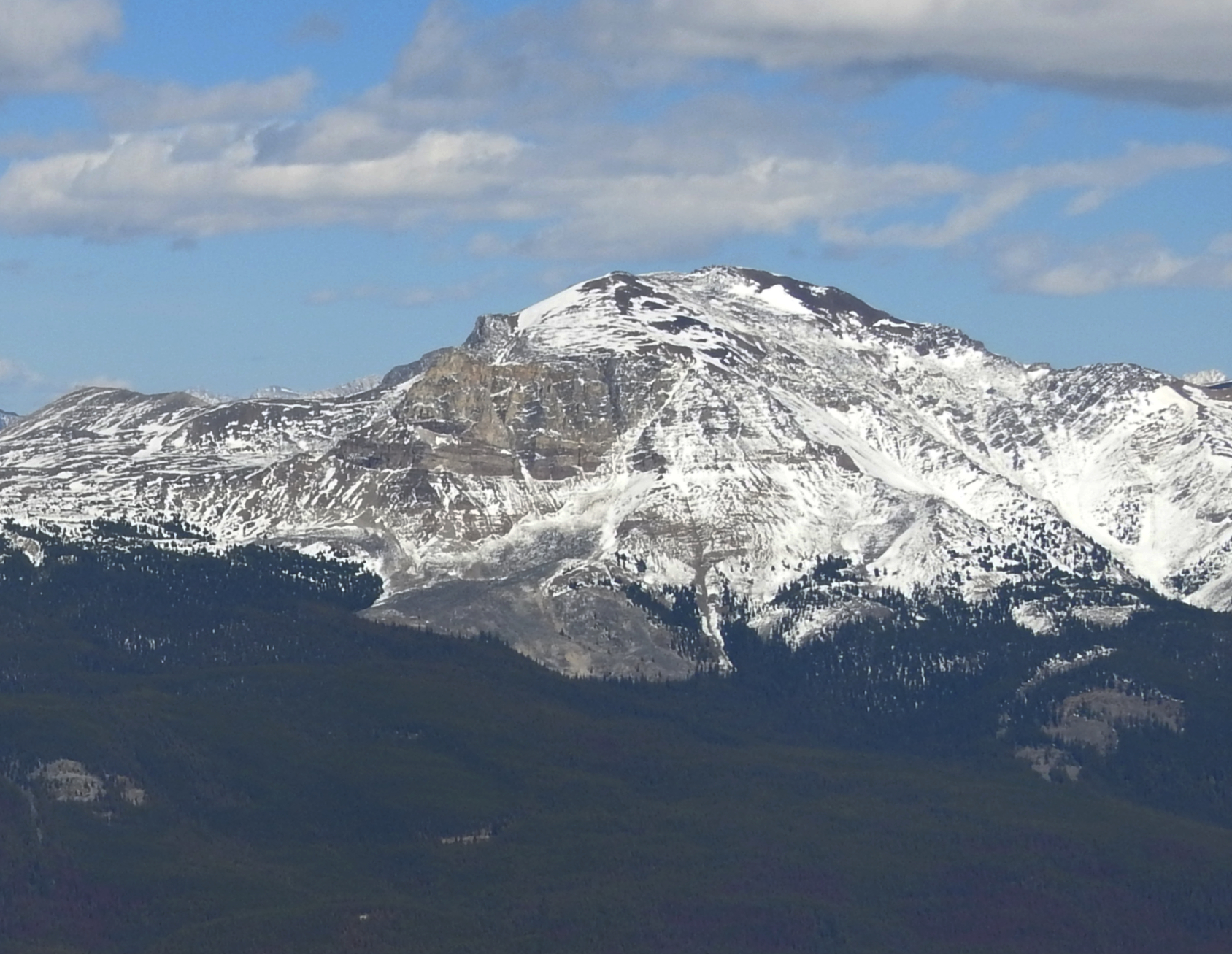
Mt. Tekarra from The Whistlers

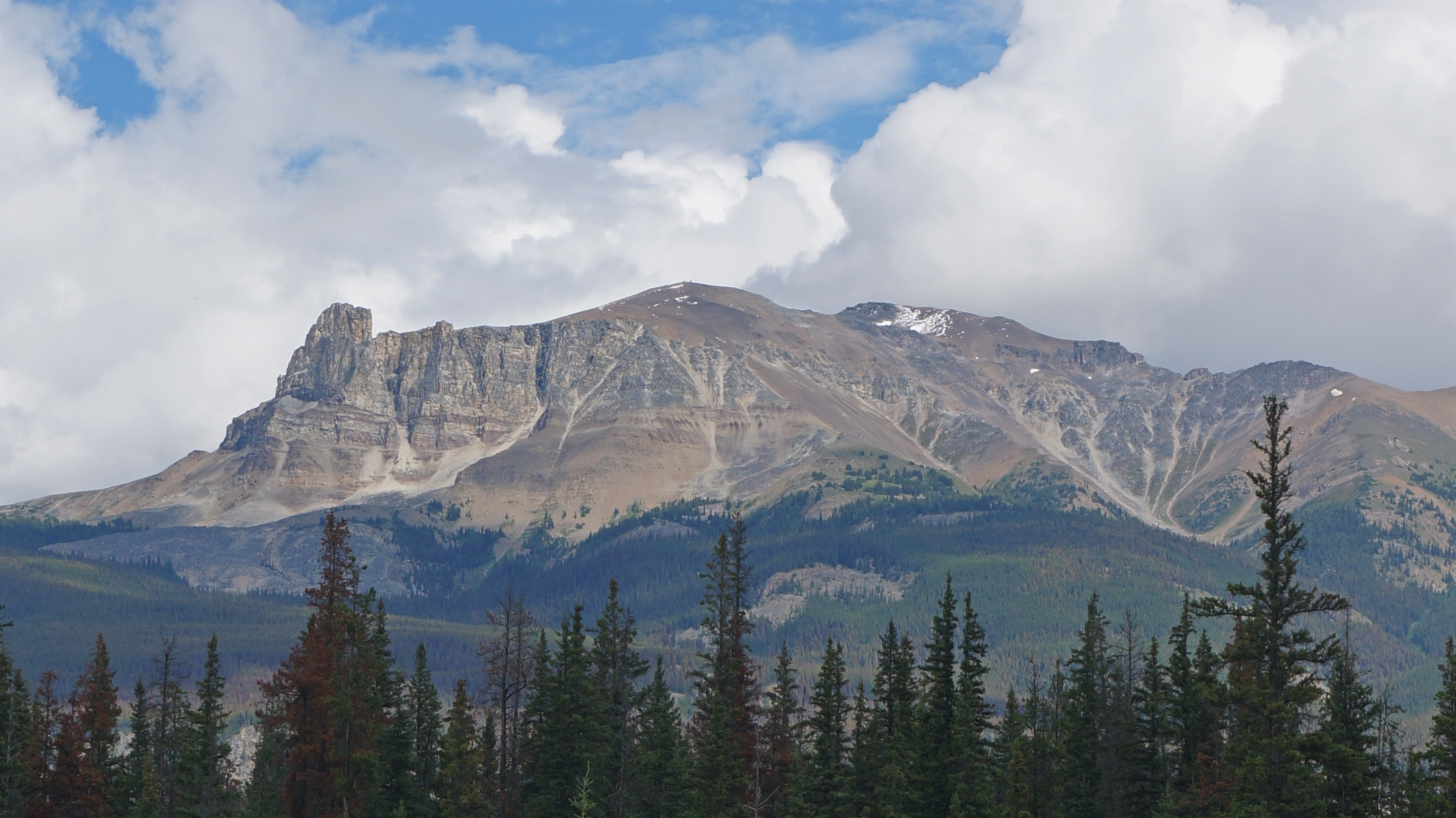
Mt. Tekarra from the Athabasca Valley

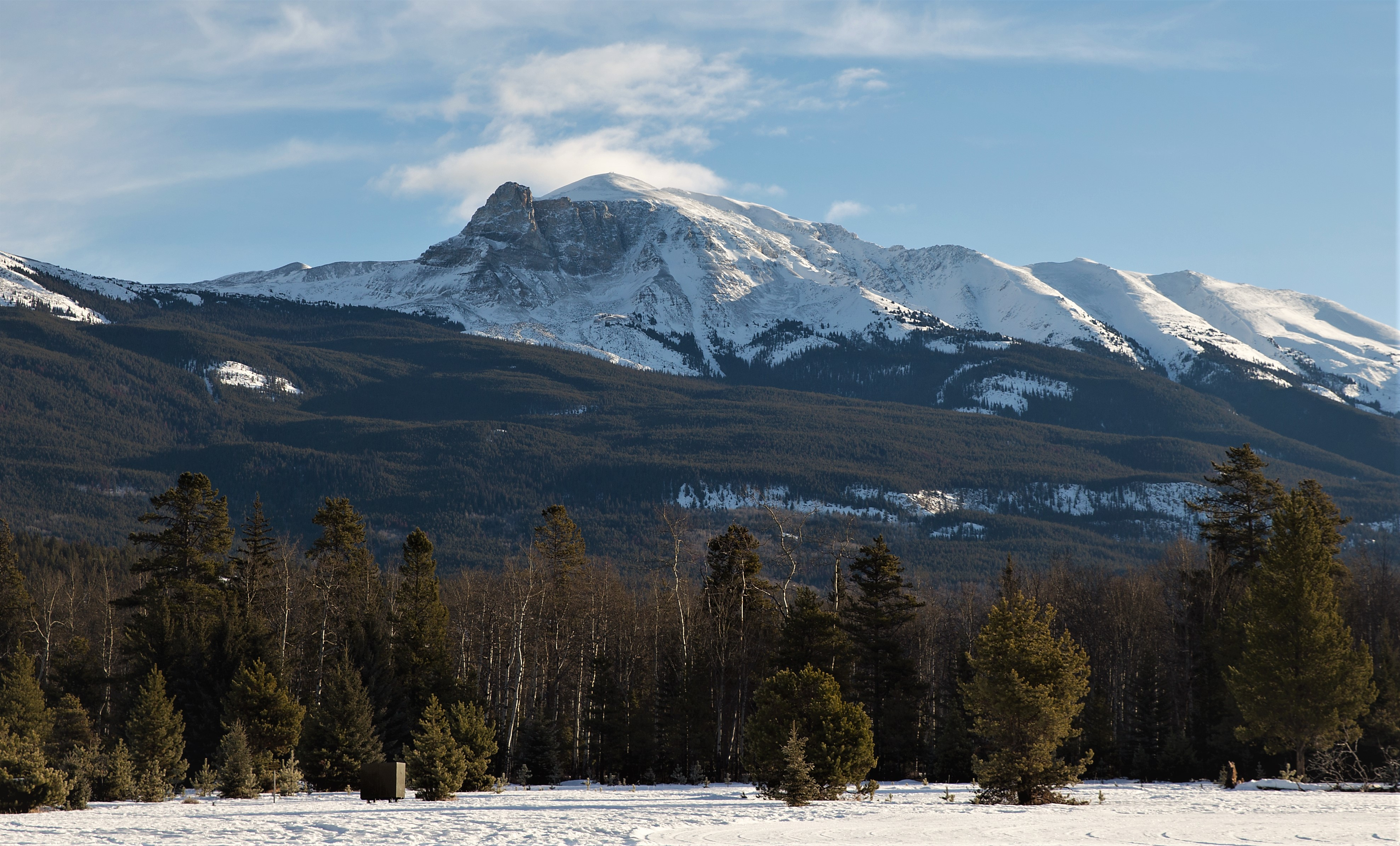
Mt. Tekarra in January

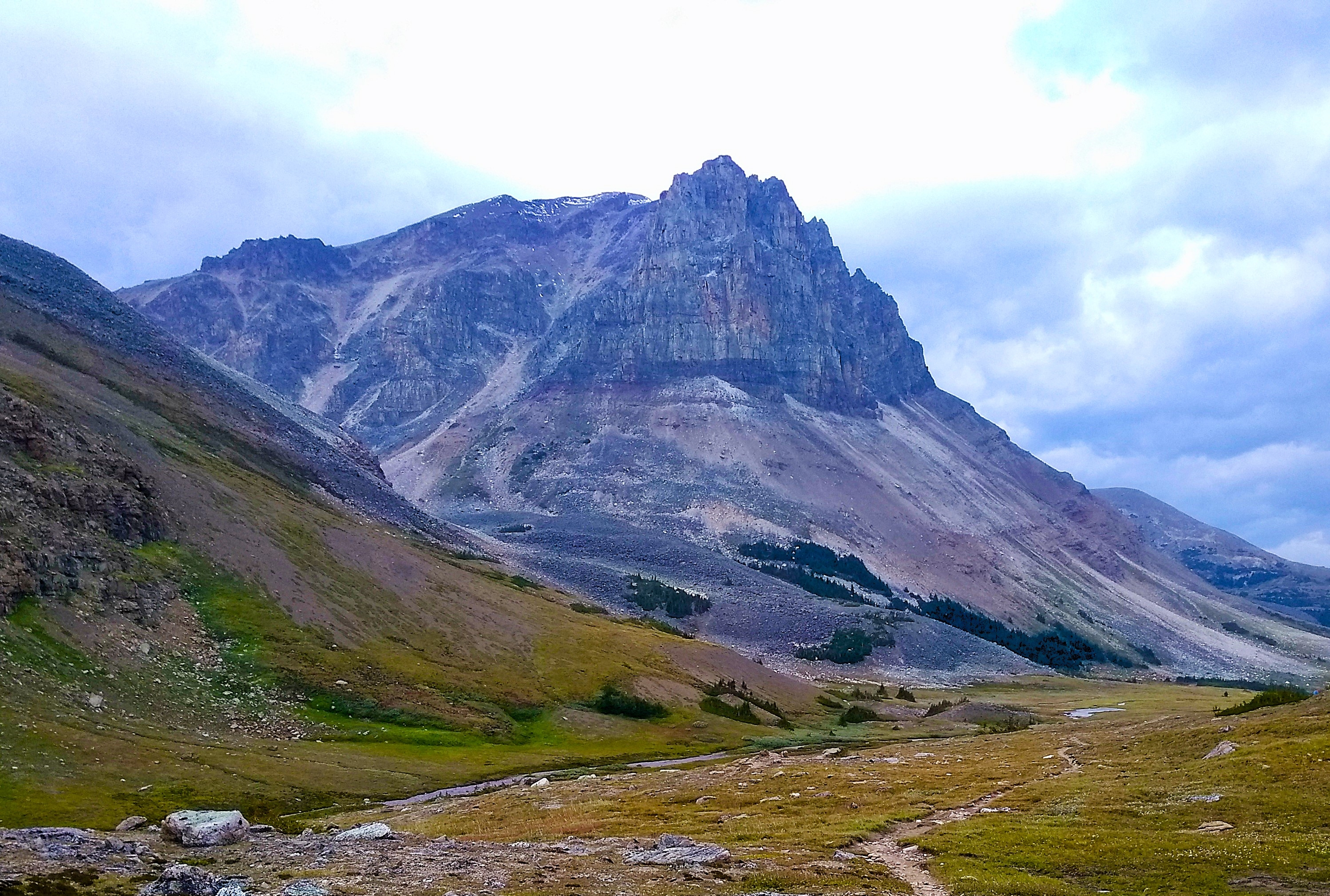
Southeast aspect

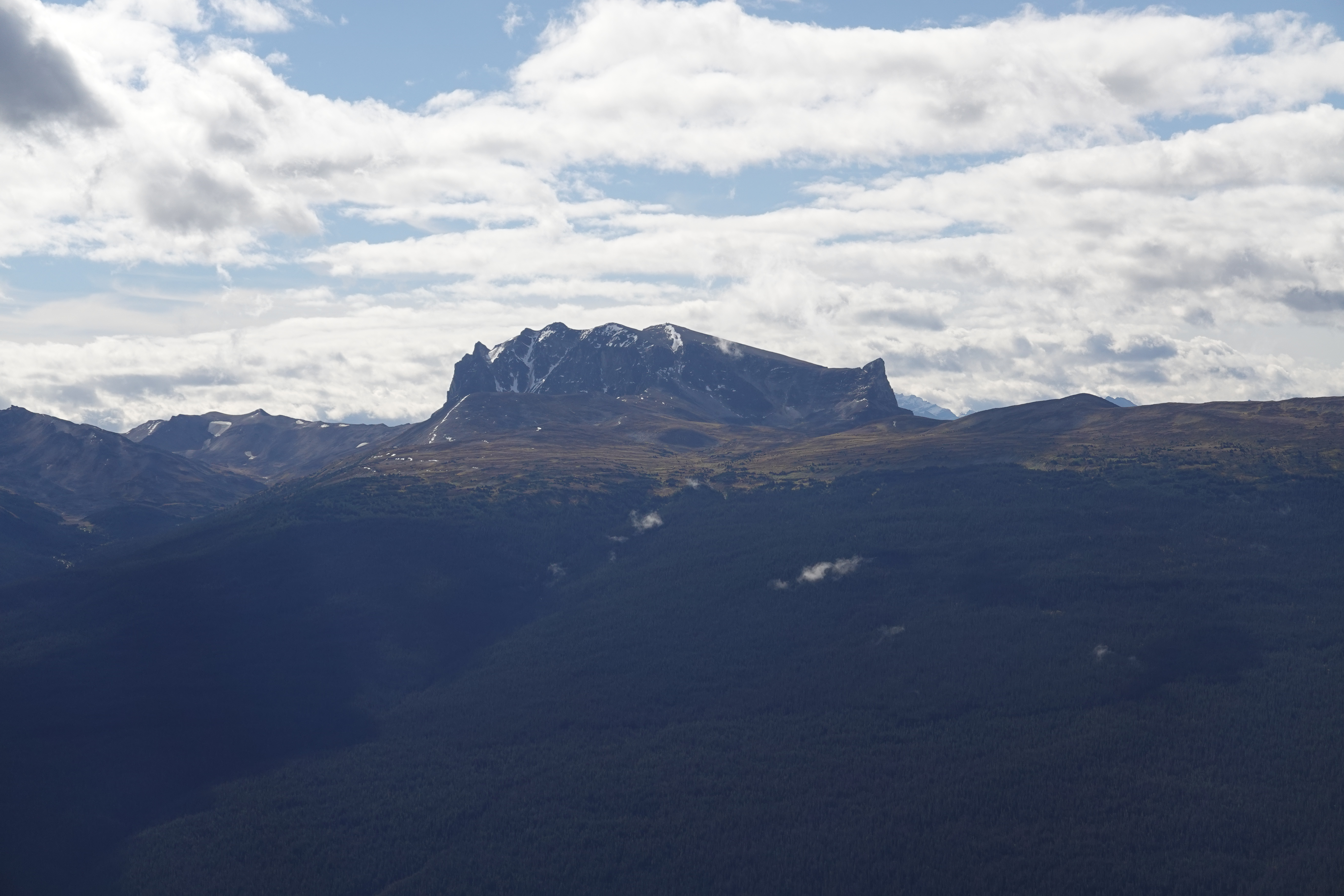
Mt. Tekarra as seen from Roche Bonhomme summit

== See also ==
- Geography of Alberta
