= Centre Mountain (Alberta) =

Mountain in Jasper NP, Alberta, Canada

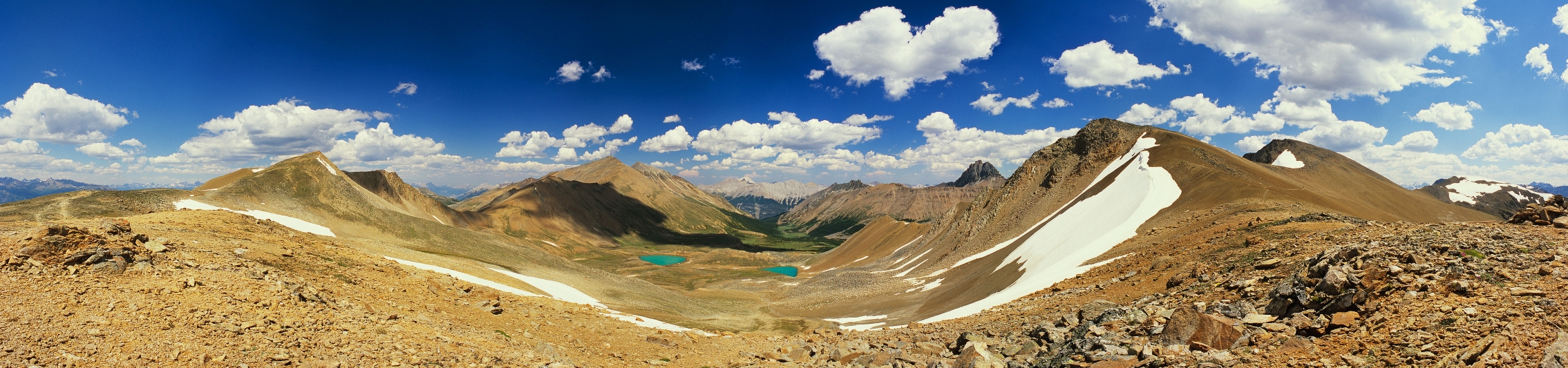
- View from Amber Mountain looking northeast toward Centre Mountain, The Watchtower, and South Amber Mountain

Highest point
- Elevation: 2,700 m (8,900 ft)
- Prominence: 145 m (476 ft)
- Parent peak: The Watchtower (2971 m)
- Listing: Mountains of Alberta
- Coordinates: 52°49′44″N 117°53′37″W

Geography
- Location within Alberta Location within Canada
- Country: Canada
- Province: Alberta
- Protected area: Jasper National Park
- Parent range: Maligne Range; Canadian Rockies
- Topo map: NTS 83C13 Medicine Lake

Centre Mountain is a 2,700-metre (8,858-foot) mountain summit located in the Maligne Range of Jasper National Park, in the Canadian Rockies of Alberta, Canada. The mountain was named in 1916 by Morrison Bridgland for its location between Excelsior Mountain and Amber Mountain.

== See also ==
- Geography of Alberta
