= Centre Mountain =

Centre Mountain may refer to:

- Centre Mountain (Alberta) in the Maligne Range, Alberta, Canada
- Centre Mountain (Flathead Range) in British Columbia, Canada
