= Amber Mountain =

Amber Mountain may refer to:

- Amber Mountain (Alberta), a mountain in Canada
- Amber Mountain National Park, a protected area in Madagascar
- Mount Ambohitra, a mountain in Madagascar
