= Curator Mountain =

Mountain in Alberta, Canada

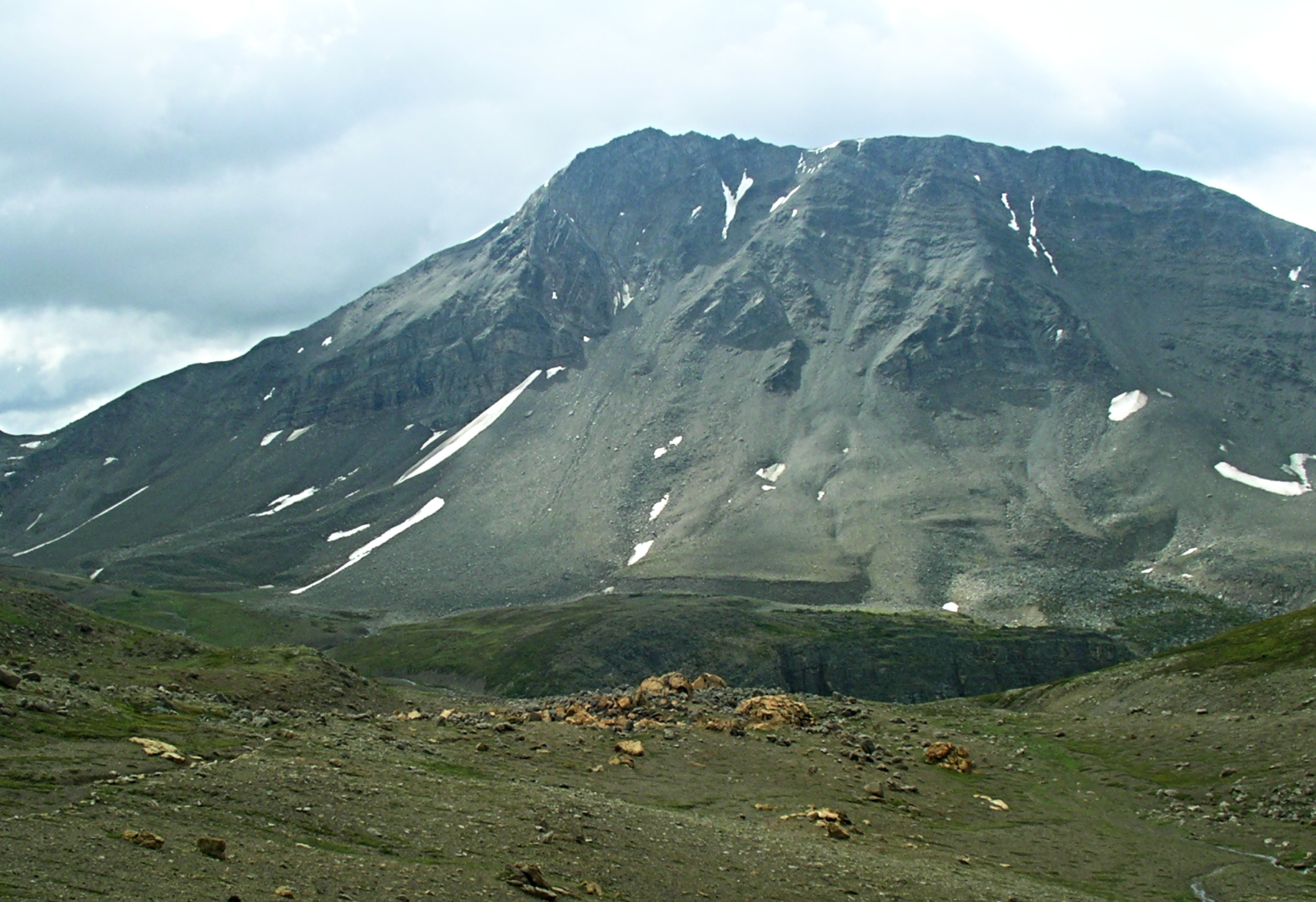
- Curator Mountain

Highest point
- Elevation: 2,624 m (8,609 ft)
- Prominence: 284 m (932 ft)
- Parent peak: Trowel Peak (2640 m)
- Listing: Mountains of Alberta
- Coordinates: 52°46′37″N 117°50′52″W

Geography
- Location within Alberta Location within Canada
- Location: Jasper National Park; Alberta
- Parent range: Maligne Range; Canadian Rockies
- Topo map: NTS 83C13 Medicine Lake

Geology
- Rock age: Cambrian
- Rock type: Sedimentary rock

Climbing
- Easiest route: Scramble

Curator Mountain is a 2,624-metre (8,609-foot) mountain summit located in the Maligne Range of Jasper National Park, in the Canadian Rockies of Alberta, Canada. Curator Mountain was so named on account of its central location, as if it were the "custodian" of Shovel Pass. The mountain was named in 1916 by Morrison P. Bridgland (1878-1948), a Dominion Land Surveyor who named many peaks in Jasper Park and the Canadian Rockies. The mountain's name was officially adopted in 1947 when approved by the Geographical Names Board of Canada. Its nearest higher peak is Trowel Peak, 7.7 km (4.8 mi) to the southeast. Curator Mountain is composed of sedimentary rock laid down during the Cambrian period and pushed east and over the top of younger rock during the Laramide orogeny.

== Climate ==
Based on the Köppen climate classification, Curator Mountain is located in a subarctic climate with long, cold, snowy winters, and mild summers. Temperatures can drop below -20 °C with wind chill factors below -30 °C. Precipitation runoff from Curator Mountain drains into tributaries of the Athabasca River.

== Gallery ==
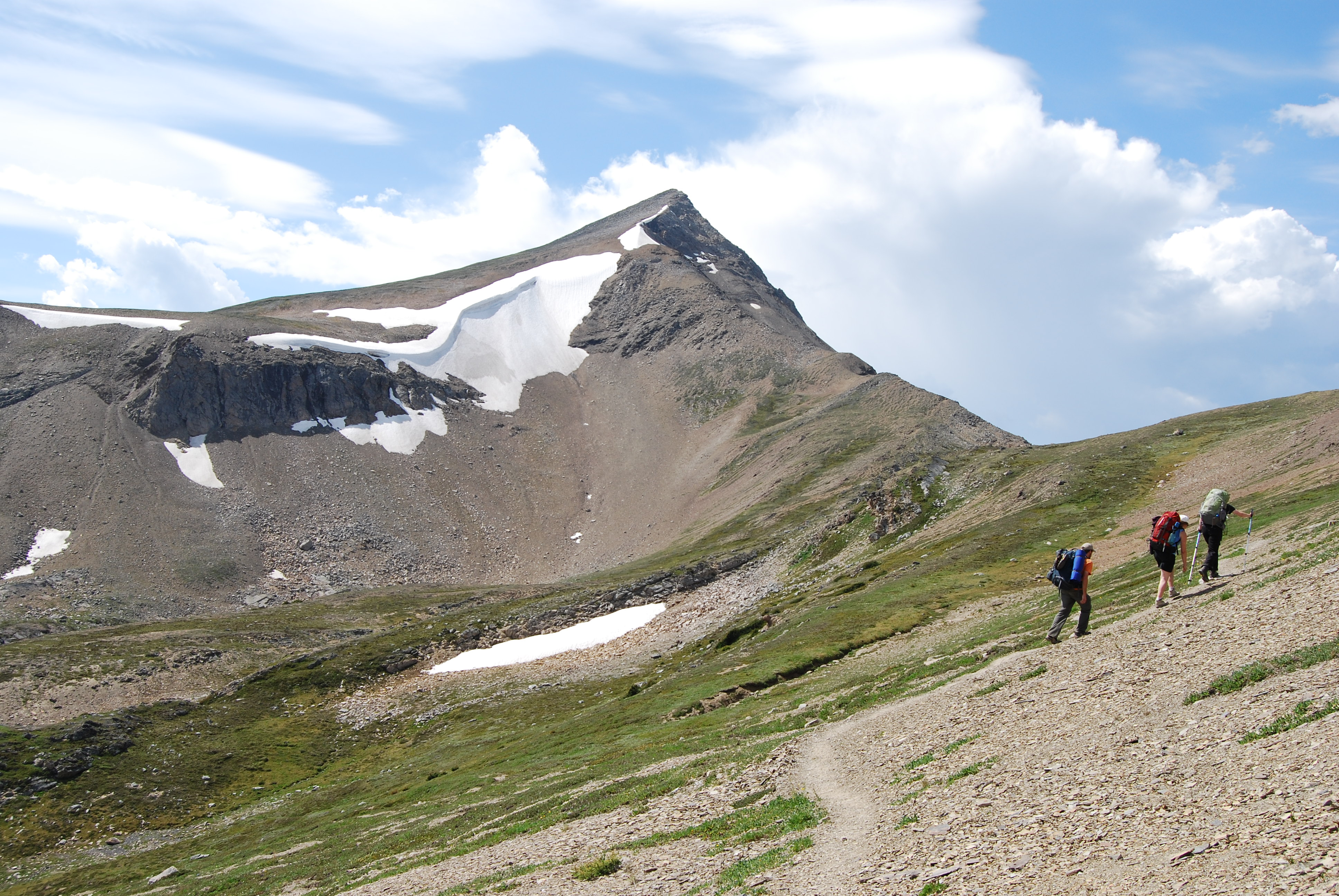
Curator Mountain from Skyline Trail

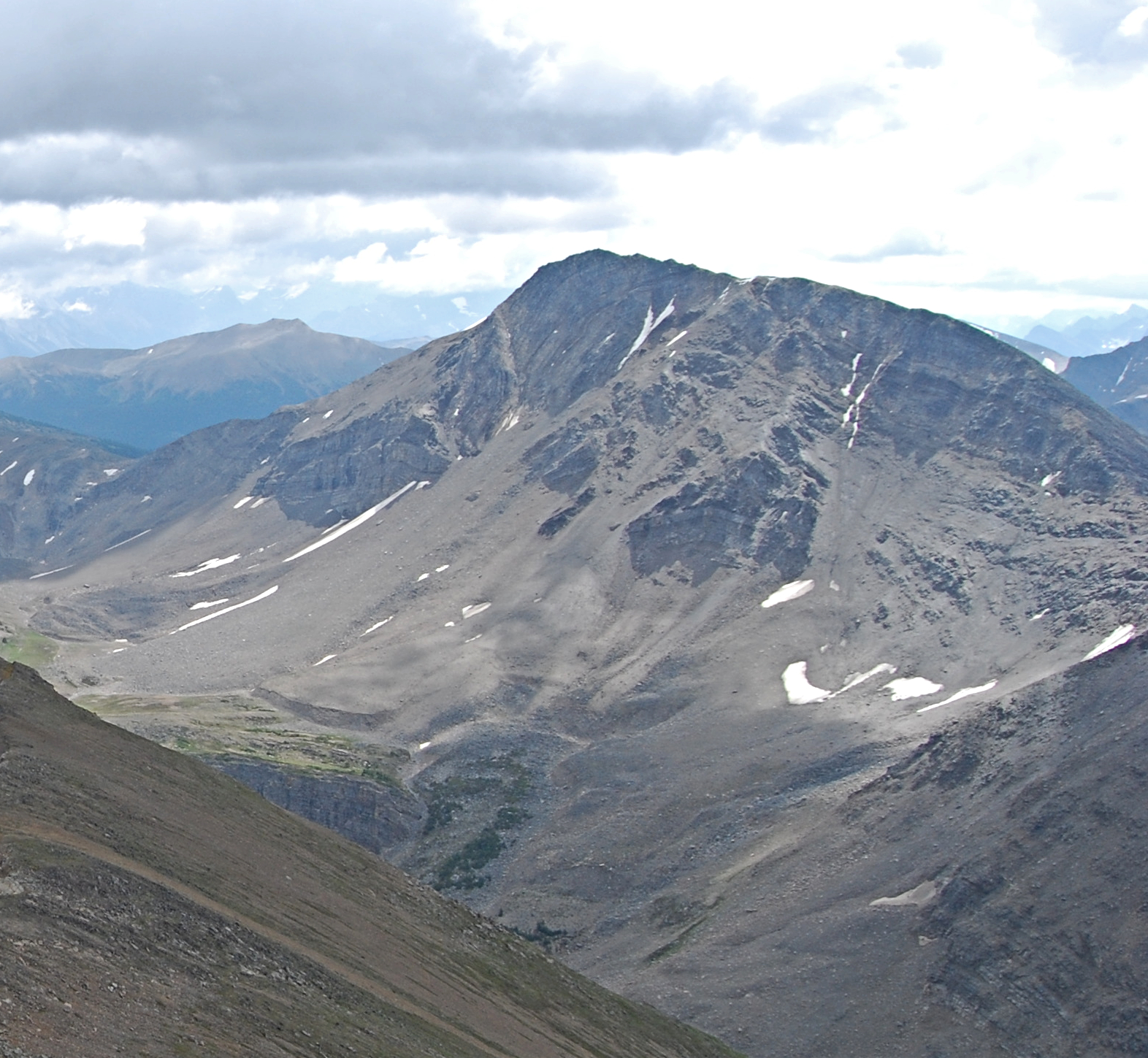
Curator Mountain

== See also ==
- Geography of Alberta
