= Maligne Range =

Subrange of the Front Ranges in Alberta, Canada

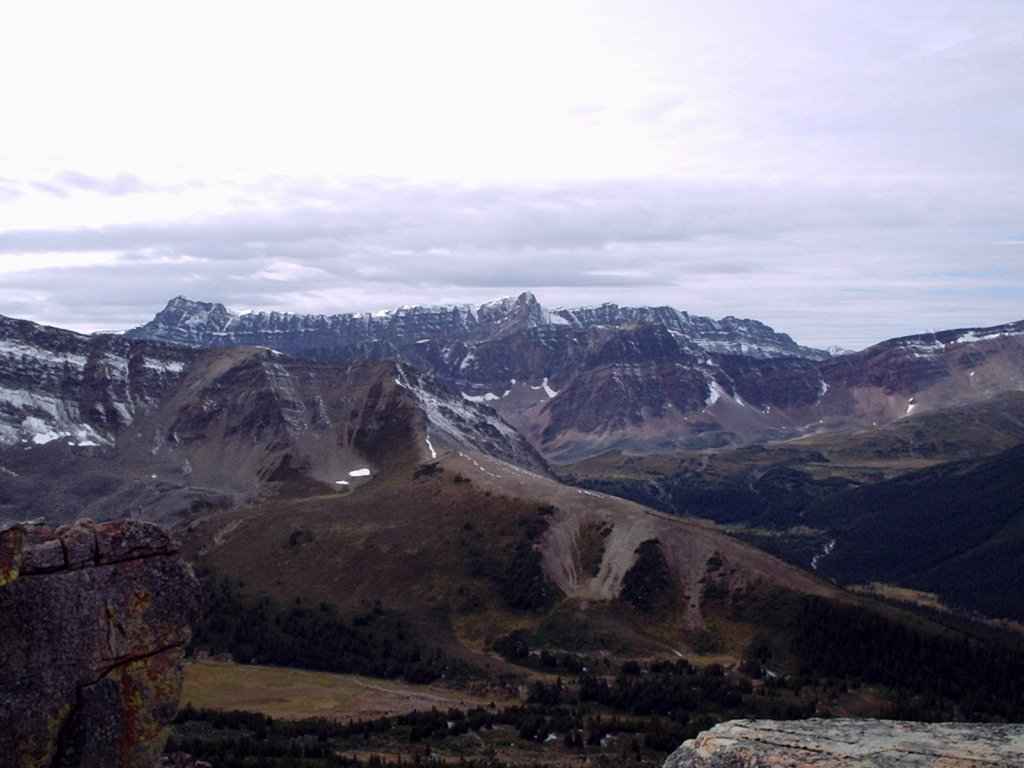
- Maligne Range seen from the Bald Hills

Highest point
- Peak: Mount Kerkeslin
- Elevation: 2,984 m (9,790 ft)
- Listing: Mountains of Alberta
- Coordinates: 52°38′56″N 117°49′36″W

Geography
- Location within Alberta Location within Canada
- Country: Canada
- Province: Alberta
- Protected area: Jasper National Park
- Range coordinates: 52°46′59″N 117°47′44″W
- Parent range: Canadian Rockies
- Topo map: NTS 83C13 Medicine Lake

The Maligne Range is a mountain range of the Canadian Rockies located directly southeast of Jasper townsite in Jasper National Park, Canada. The southern tail-end of the range finishes at Endless Chain Ridge.

== Mountains ==
This range includes the following mountains and peaks:

Mountain/Peak	Elevation		Coordinates
Mountain/Peak	m	ft	Coordinates
Mount Kerkeslin	2,984	9,790	52°38'55"N, 117°49'36"W
Evelyn Peak	2,855	9,367	52°40'18"N, 117°45'43"W
The Watchtower	2,791	9,157	52°49'22"N, 117°50'29"W
Excelsior Mountain	2,744	9,003	
Mount Hardisty	2,716	8,911	52°42'17"N, 117°49'28"W
Centre Mountain	2,700	8,900	52°49'44"N, 117°53'37"W
Mount Tekarra	2,694	8,839	52°50'30"N, 117°56'22"W
Trowel Peak	2,640	8,660	
Curator Mountain	2,622	8,602	52°46'37"N, 117°50'52"W
Amber Mountain	2,565	8,415	52°49'30.360"N, 117°55'41.520"W
Antler Mountain	2,557	8,389	
Aberhart Mountain	2,555	8,383	
Sunset Peak	2,464	8,084	
Signal Mountain	2,312	7,585	52°51'36"N, 117°58'12"W

== See also ==
- Ranges of the Canadian Rockies
