= Mount Hardisty =

Mountain in Jasper National Park, Alberta, Canada

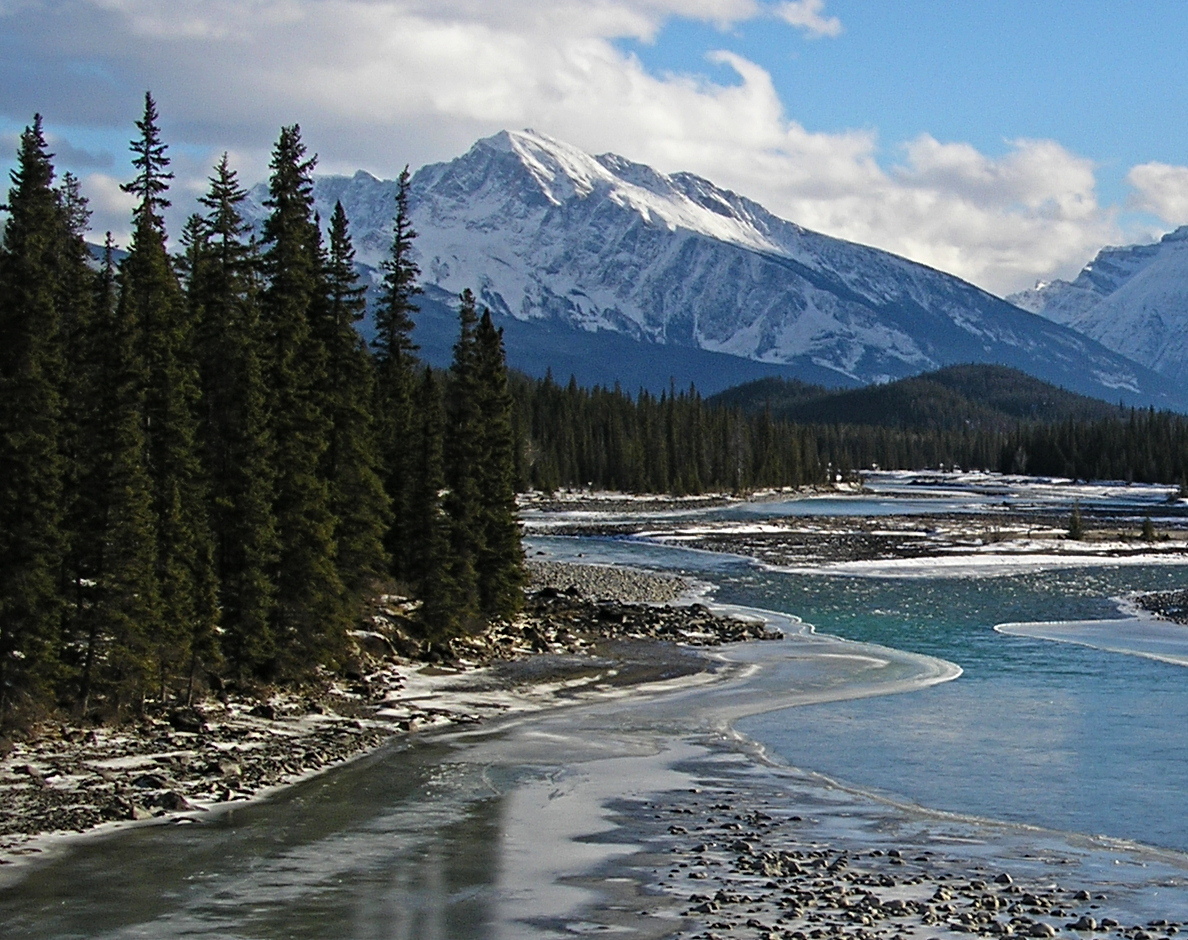
- Mount Hardisty and Athabasca River

Highest point
- Elevation: 2,716 m (8,911 ft)
- Prominence: 456 m (1,496 ft)
- Parent peak: Mount Kerkeslin (2984 m)
- Listing: Mountains of Alberta
- Coordinates: 52°42′17″N 117°49′28″W

Geography
- Location within Alberta Location within Canada
- Country: Canada
- Province: Alberta
- Parent range: Maligne Range; Canadian Rockies
- Topo map: NTS 83C12 Athabasca Falls

Geology
- Rock age: Cambrian
- Rock type: Sedimentary rock

Climbing
- Easiest route: Scramble

Mount Hardisty is a 2,716 m (8,911 ft) mountain summit located in the Athabasca River valley of Jasper National Park, in the Canadian Rockies of Alberta, Canada. Its nearest higher peak is Mount Kerkeslin, 6.0 km (3.7 mi) to the south. Both mountains are part of the Maligne Range and are visible from the Icefields Parkway.

== History ==
The mountain was named by James Hector in 1859 for Richard Hardisty (1831–1889), Chief factor at Rocky Mountain House, and later the first Metis Senator in Canada.

The mountain's name was officially adopted in 1912 by the Geographical Names Board of Canada.

== Geology ==
Mount Hardisty is composed of sedimentary rock laid down during the Cambrian period and pushed east and over the top of younger rock during the Laramide orogeny.

== Climate ==
Based on the Köppen climate classification, Mount Hardisty is located in a subarctic climate with cold, snowy winters, and mild summers. Temperatures can drop below -20 °C with wind chill factors below -30 °C. Precipitation runoff from Mount Hardisty drains into the Athabasca River.

== Gallery ==
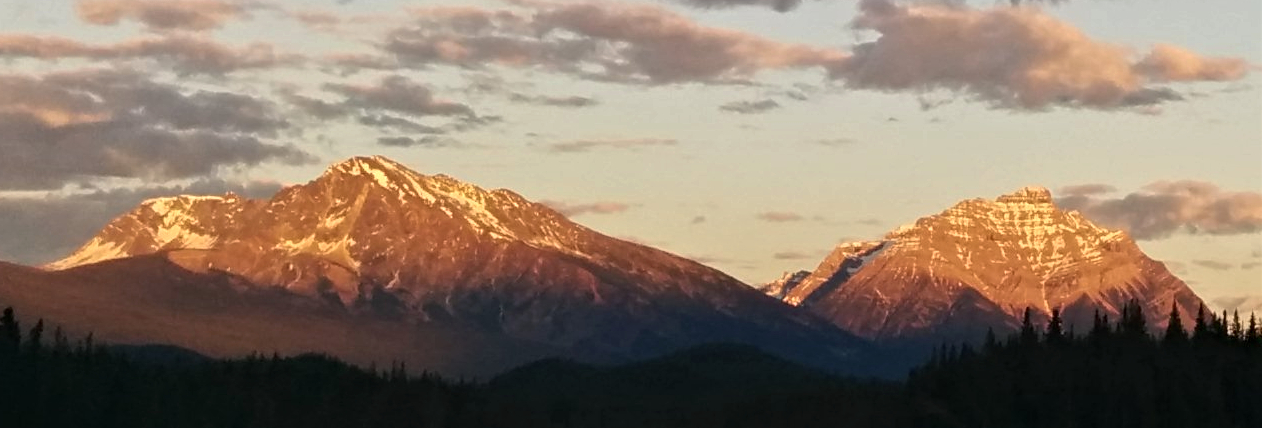
Hardisty (left) and Kerkeslin (right) at sunset

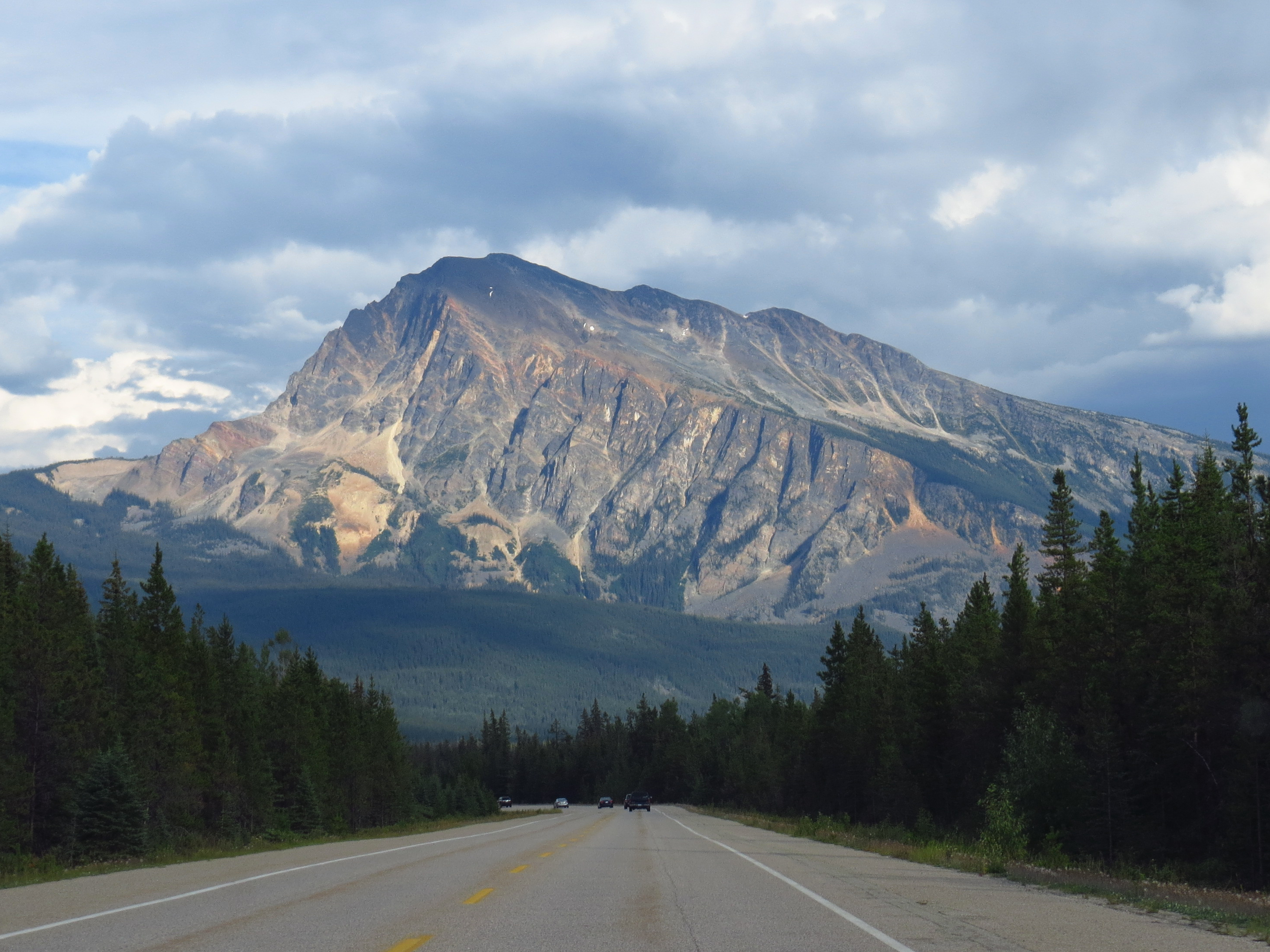
Mount Hardisty from Icefields Parkway

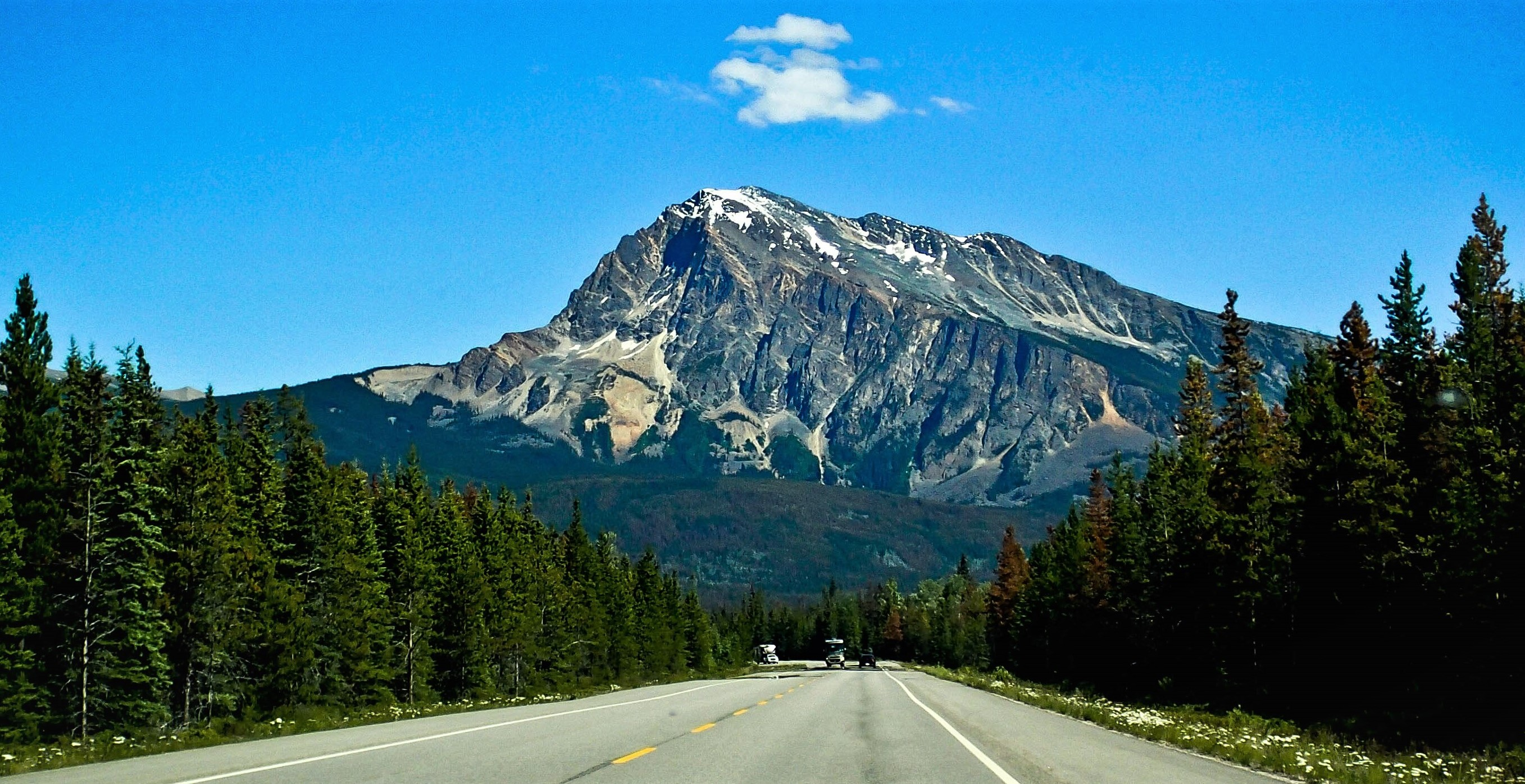
Mount Hardisty from Icefields Parkway

== See also ==
- Geography of Alberta
