= Endless Chain Ridge =

Mountain ridge in the country of Canada

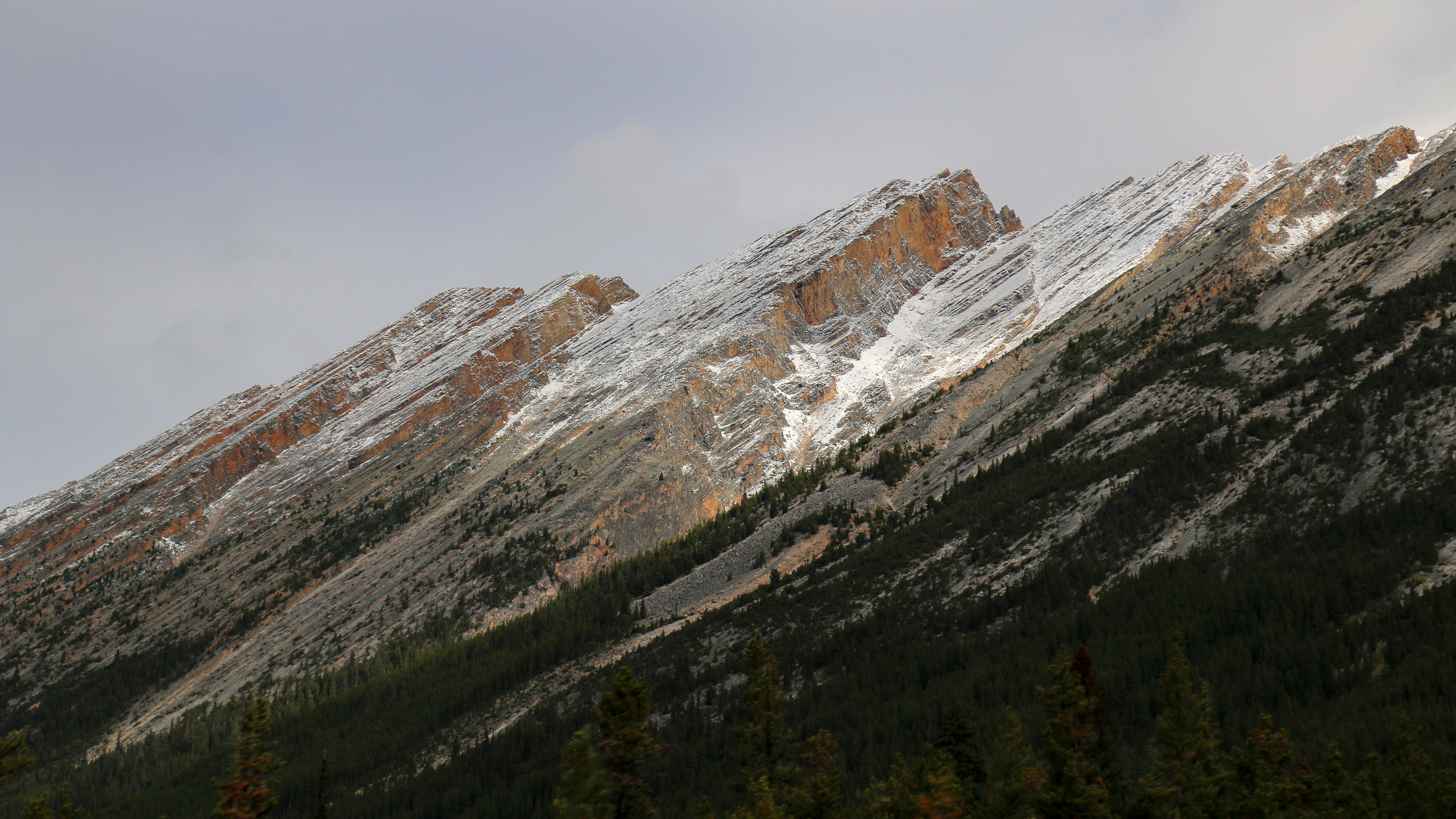
- Endless Chain Ridge

Highest point
- Elevation: 2,867 m (9,406 ft)
- Coordinates: 52°32′12″N 117°33′16″W

Geography
- Location within Alberta Location within Canada
- Interactive map of Endless Chain Ridge
- Location: Jasper National Park; Alberta, Canada
- Parent range: Maligne Range; Canadian Rockies
- Topo map: NTS 83C6 Sunwapta Peak

Endless Chain Ridge is a 16-kilometre-long (9.9-mile), 2,867-metre-high (9,406-foot), mountainous ridge located in Jasper National Park, in the Canadian Rockies of Alberta, Canada. The ridge is situated at the southern end of the Maligne Range, and east of the confluence of the Sunwapta River with the Athabasca River. Seen from the Icefields Parkway, the ridge is relatively unimpressive, but from the east side it appears as a rugged chain of peaks, all quite difficult to climb.

== History ==
The ridge was named in 1907 by Mary Schäffer, the same year that Jasper National Park was established. In her book, "A Hunter of Peace," Mary wrote: "A short distance beyond the rock-slide and on the river's right, begins a low, rocky ridge, which for length and unadulterated ugliness cannot be beaten. We trailed it for a day and a half and then named it The Endless Chain, well named too, for on reaching the Athabasca shores, we found that it still stretched on in an unbroken line for miles down the river."

The toponym was officially adopted in 1947 by the Geographical Names Board of Canada.

== Climate ==
Based on the Köppen climate classification, Endless Chain Ridge is located in a subarctic climate with cold, snowy winters, and mild summers. Winter temperatures can drop below −20 °C with wind chill factors below −30 °C. Precipitation runoff from Endless Chain Ridge drains west to the Sunwapta River, or east into the Maligne River, both of which are tributaries of the Athabasca River.

== Geology ==
The ridge is composed of sedimentary rock laid down during the Precambrian to Jurassic periods and pushed east and over the top of younger rock during the Laramide orogeny.

== Gallery ==
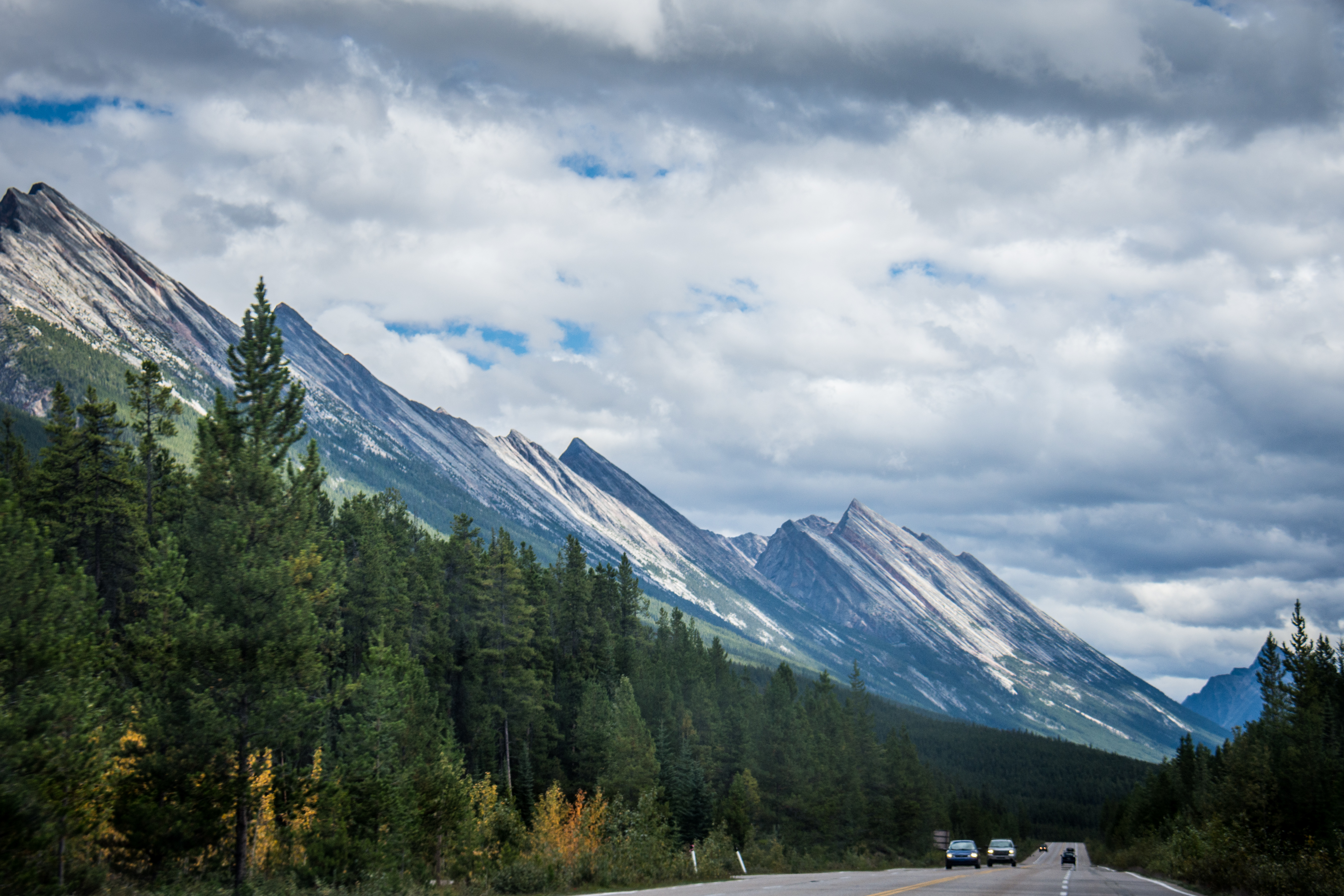
Endless Chain Ridge seen from southbound Highway 93

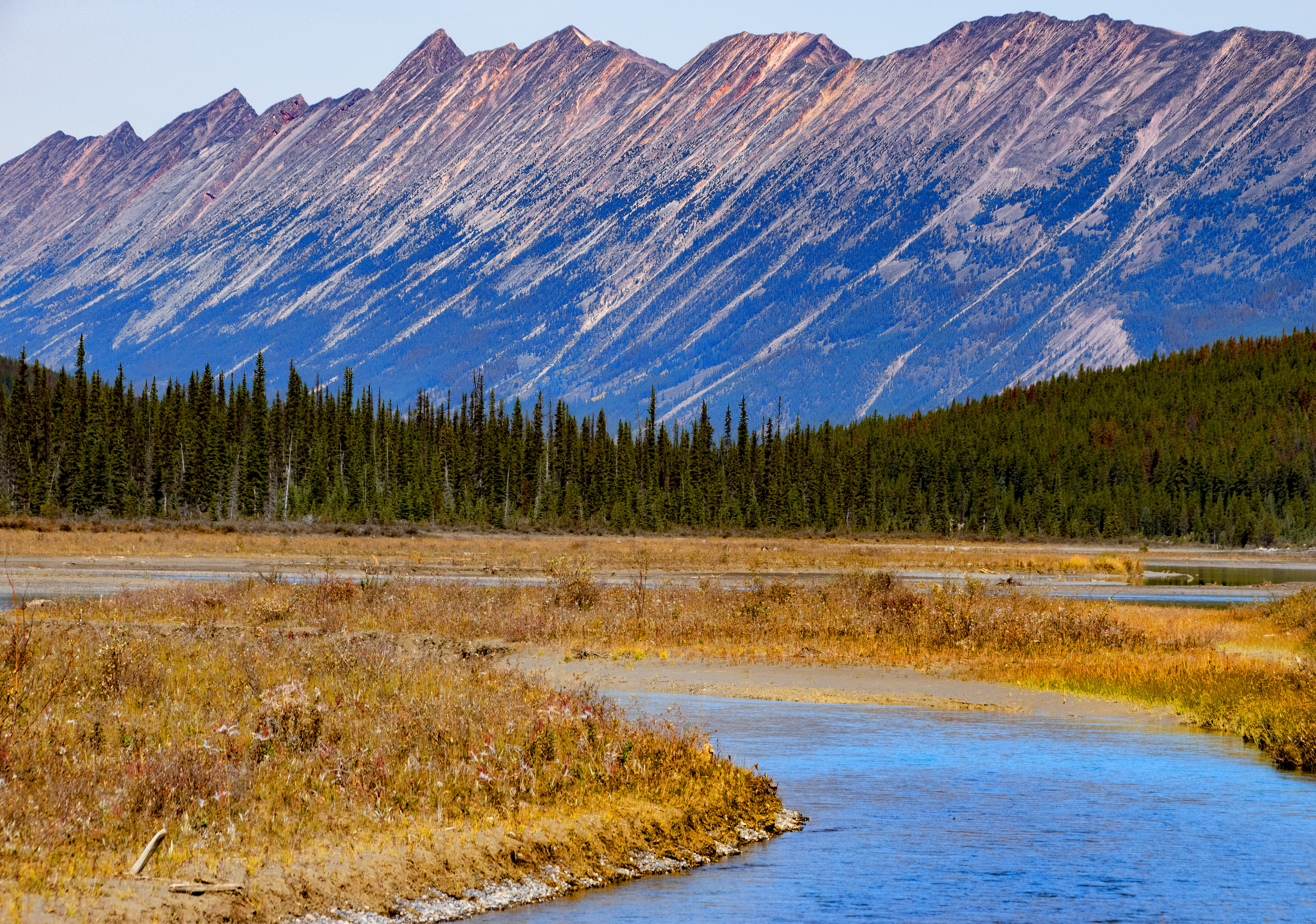
Endless Chain Ridge

== See also ==
- Geography of Alberta
