= Signal Mountain (Alberta) =

Mountain in Alberta, Canada

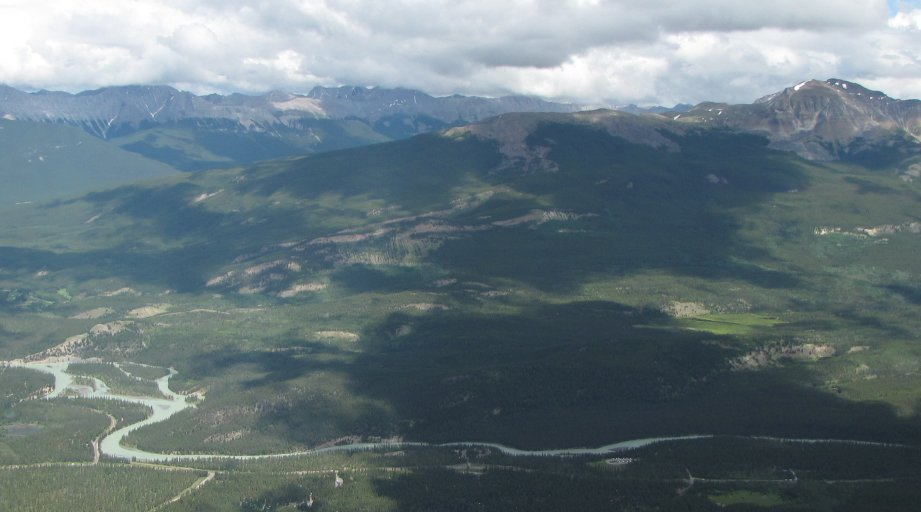

Highest point
- Elevation: 2,255 m (7,398 ft)
- Prominence: 92 m (302 ft)
- Listing: Mountains of Alberta
- Coordinates: 52°51′53″N 117°58′44″W

Geography
- Location within Alberta
- Country: Canada
- Province: Alberta
- Protected area: Jasper National Park
- Parent range: Maligne Range
- Topo map: NTS 83C13 Medicine Lake

Signal Mountain is a mountain in the Maligne Range in Alberta. It was named in 1916 by Morrison P. Bridgland.

== See also ==
- Geography of Alberta
