= The Watchtower (Alberta) =

Mountain in the country of Canada

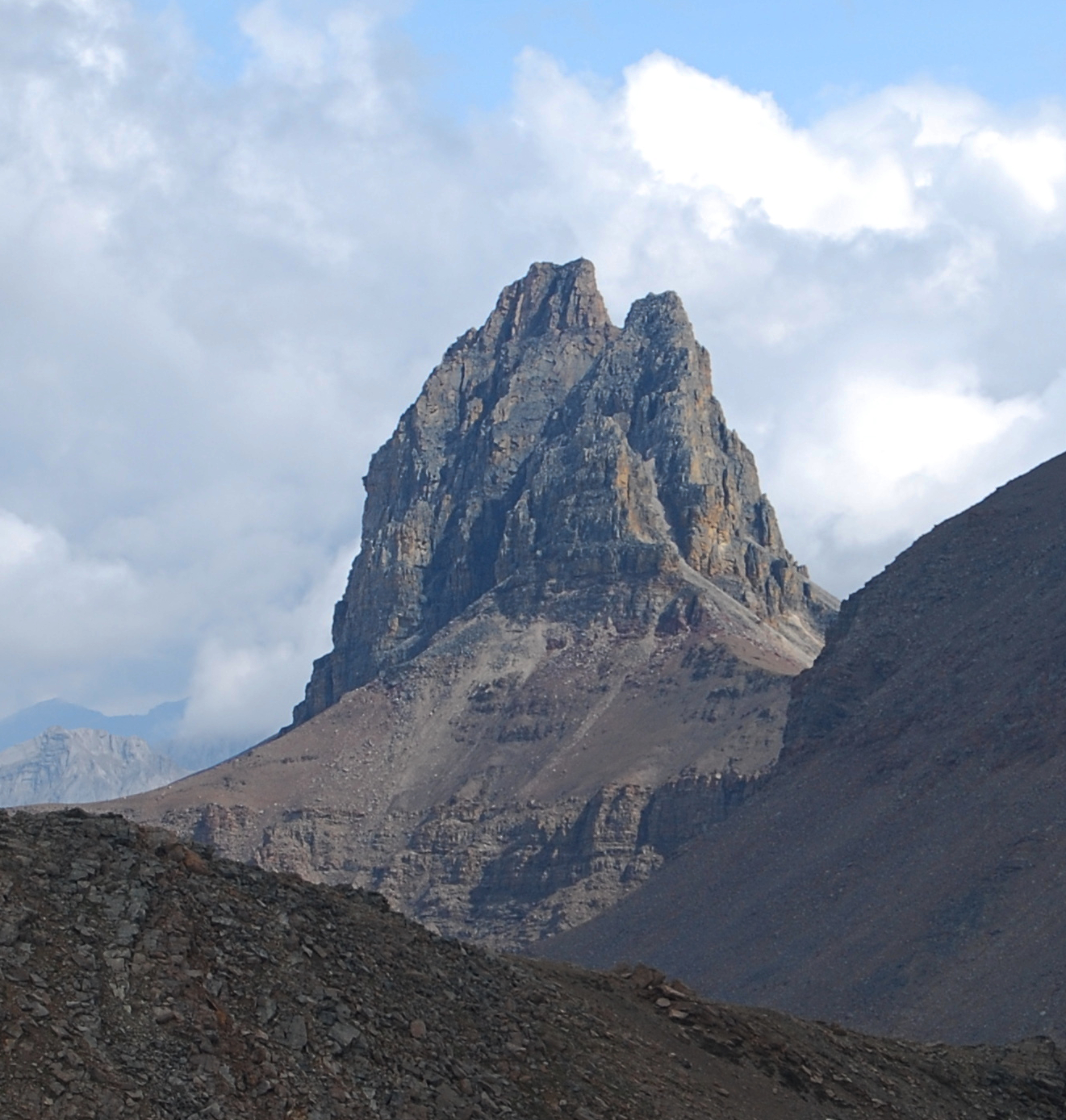
- The Watchtower

Highest point
- Elevation: 2,791 m (9,157 ft)
- Prominence: 651 m (2,136 ft)
- Parent peak: Mount Kerkeslin (2984 m)
- Listing: Mountains of Alberta
- Coordinates: 52°49′24″N 117°50′30″W

Geography
- Location within Alberta Location within Canada
- Country: Canada
- Province: Alberta
- Parent range: Maligne Range; Canadian Rockies
- Topo map: NTS 83C13 Medicine Lake

Geology
- Rock age: Cambrian
- Rock type: Sedimentary rock

Climbing
- First ascent: 1951 R.K. Irvin, J. Mowat, R. Strong
- Easiest route: Climbing

The Watchtower is a 2,791-metre (9,157 ft) mountain summit located in the Maligne River valley of Jasper National Park, in the Canadian Rockies of Alberta, Canada. It is situated in the Maligne Range and is visible from the Maligne Lake Road where it towers over Medicine Lake. Its nearest higher peak is Sirdar Mountain, 11.64 km (7.23 mi) to the north.

== History ==
The mountain was named in 1916 by Morrison P. Bridgland (1878-1948), a Dominion Land Surveyor who named many peaks in Jasper Park and the Canadian Rockies. The mountain's name was officially adopted in 1947 when approved by the Geographical Names Board of Canada.

The first ascent of The Watchtower was made in 1951 by R.K. Irvin, J. Mowat, and R. Strong.

== Geology ==
The Watchtower is composed of sedimentary rock laid down during the Cambrian period and pushed east and over the top of younger rock during the Laramide orogeny.

== Climate ==
Based on the Köppen climate classification, The Watchtower is located in a subarctic climate zone with long, cold, snowy winters, and mild summers. Temperatures can drop below -20 °C with wind chill factors below -30 °C. Precipitation runoff from the mountain drains into Excelsior Creek and Watchtower Creek, both tributaries of the Maligne River which in turn empties into the Athabasca River.

== Gallery ==
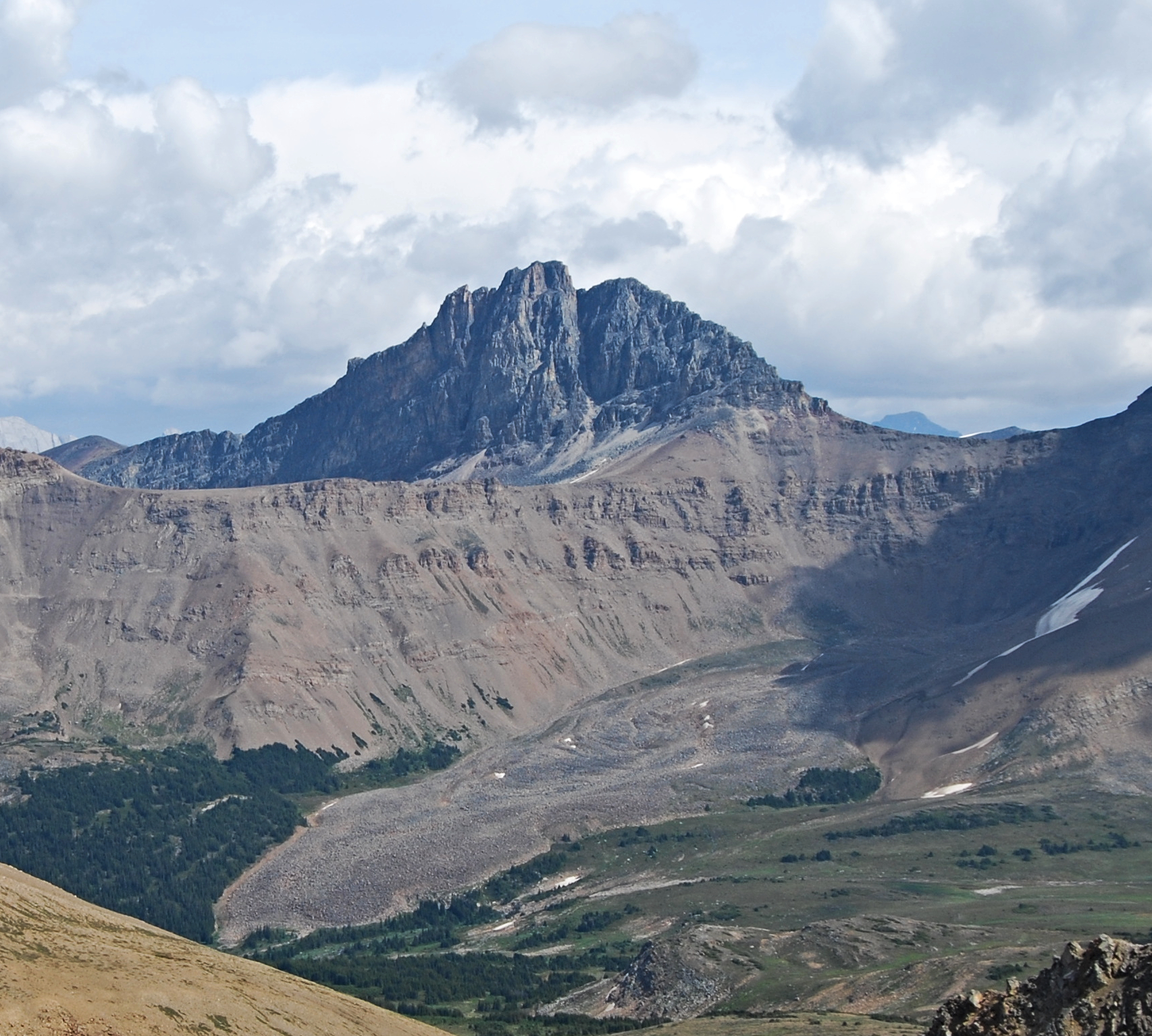
The Watchtower from Skyline Trail

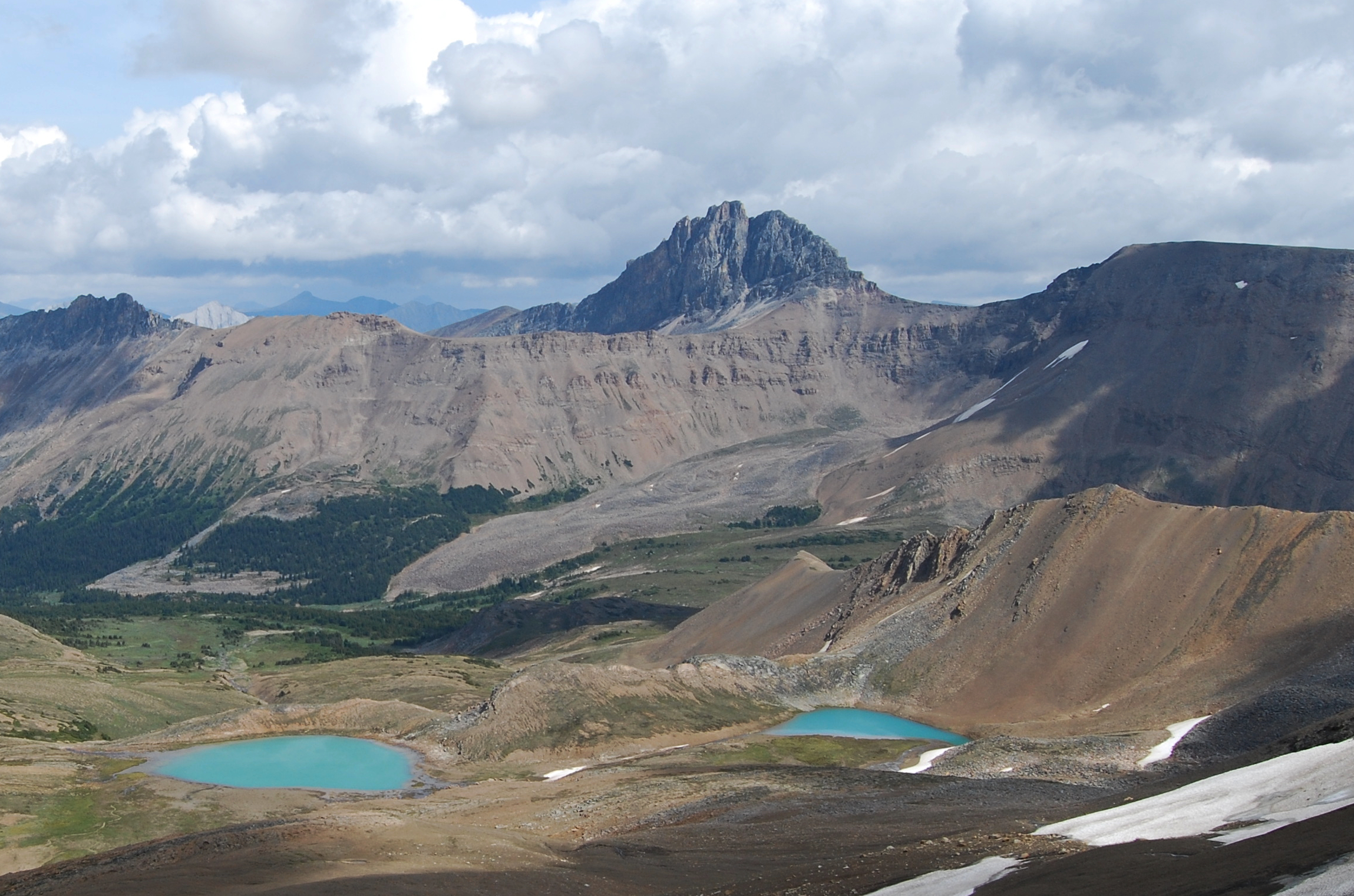
The Watchtower from Skyline Trail

== See also ==
- Geography of Alberta
