= Amber Mountain (Alberta) =

Mountain in Jasper NP, Alberta, Canada

- Location within Alberta Location within Canada

Highest point
- Elevation: 2,565 m (8,415 ft)
- Prominence: 145 m (476 ft)
- Parent peak: The Watchtower (2971 m)
- Listing: Mountains of Alberta
- Coordinates: 52°48′42″N 117°54′19″W

Geography
- Country: Canada
- Province: Alberta
- Protected area: Jasper National Park
- Parent range: Maligne Range; Canadian Rockies
- Topo map: NTS 83C13 Medicine Lake

Geology
- Rock age: Cambrian
- Rock type: Shale

Climbing
- Easiest route: Hike

Amber Mountain is a 2,565-metre (8,415-foot) mountain summit located in the Maligne Range of Jasper National Park, in the Canadian Rockies of Alberta, Canada. Amber Mountain was so named on account of amber-hued shale outcroppings. The mountain was named in 1916 by Morrison P. Bridgland (1878-1948), a Dominion Land Surveyor who named many peaks in Jasper Park and the Canadian Rockies. The mountain's name was officially adopted in 1947 when approved by the Geographical Names Board of Canada. Its nearest higher peak is The Watchtower, 5.0 km (3.1 mi) to the east. Amber Mountain is composed of sedimentary rock laid down during the Cambrian period and pushed east and over the top of younger rock during the Laramide orogeny.

== Climate ==
Based on the Köppen climate classification, Amber Mountain is located in a subarctic climate with long, cold, snowy winters, and mild summers. Temperatures can drop below −20 °C with wind chill factors below −30 °C. Precipitation runoff from Amber Mountain drains into tributaries of the Athabasca River.

== See also ==
- Geography of Alberta

== Gallery ==
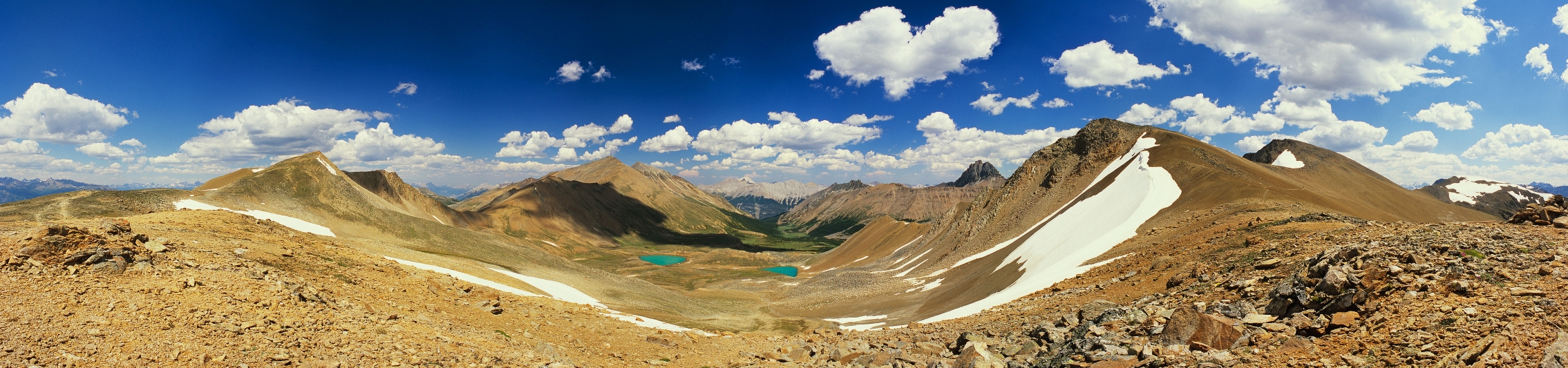
View from Amber Mountain looking northeast toward Centre Mountain, The Watchtower, and South Amber Mountain
