= Mount Kerkeslin =

Mountain in Alberta, Canada

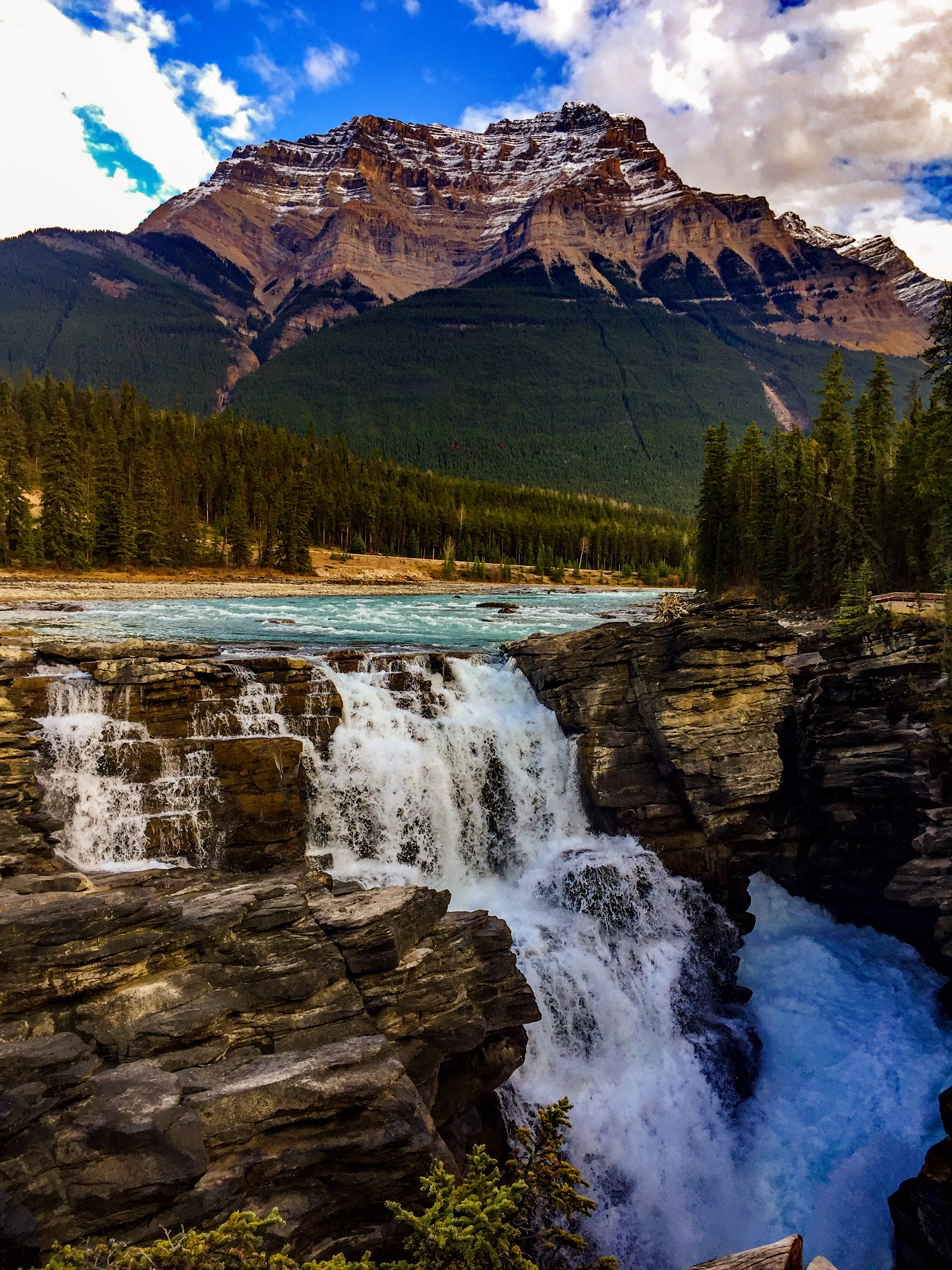
- Mount Kerkeslin seen from Athabasca Falls

Highest point
- Elevation: 2,984 m (9,790 ft)
- Prominence: 730 m (2,400 ft)
- Listing: Mountains of Alberta
- Coordinates: 52°38′55″N 117°49′36″W

Geography
- Location within Alberta Location within Canada
- Country: Canada
- Province: Alberta
- Protected area: Jasper National Park
- Parent range: Maligne Range
- Topo map: NTS 83C12 Athabasca Falls

Climbing
- First ascent: 1926 by F.H. Slark, guided by J. Weber

Mount Kerkeslin is a 2,984 m (9,790 ft) mountain summit located in the Athabasca River valley of Jasper National Park, in the Canadian Rockies of Alberta, Canada. It is the highest peak of the Maligne Range. It is located in the south part of the Maligne Range, east of the Icefields Parkway and is visible from the Athabasca Falls lookout. Mount Kerkeslin is composed of sedimentary rock laid down during the Cambrian period and pushed east and over the top of younger rock during the Laramide orogeny.

The mountain was named in 1859 by James Hector during the Palliser expedition but the source of the name is not known.

== Climate ==
Based on the Köppen climate classification, Mount Kerkeslin is located in a subarctic climate with cold, snowy winters, and mild summers. Temperatures can drop below -20 °C with wind chill factors below -30 °C. Precipitation runoff from Mount Kerkeslin drains into the Athabasca River.

== Gallery ==
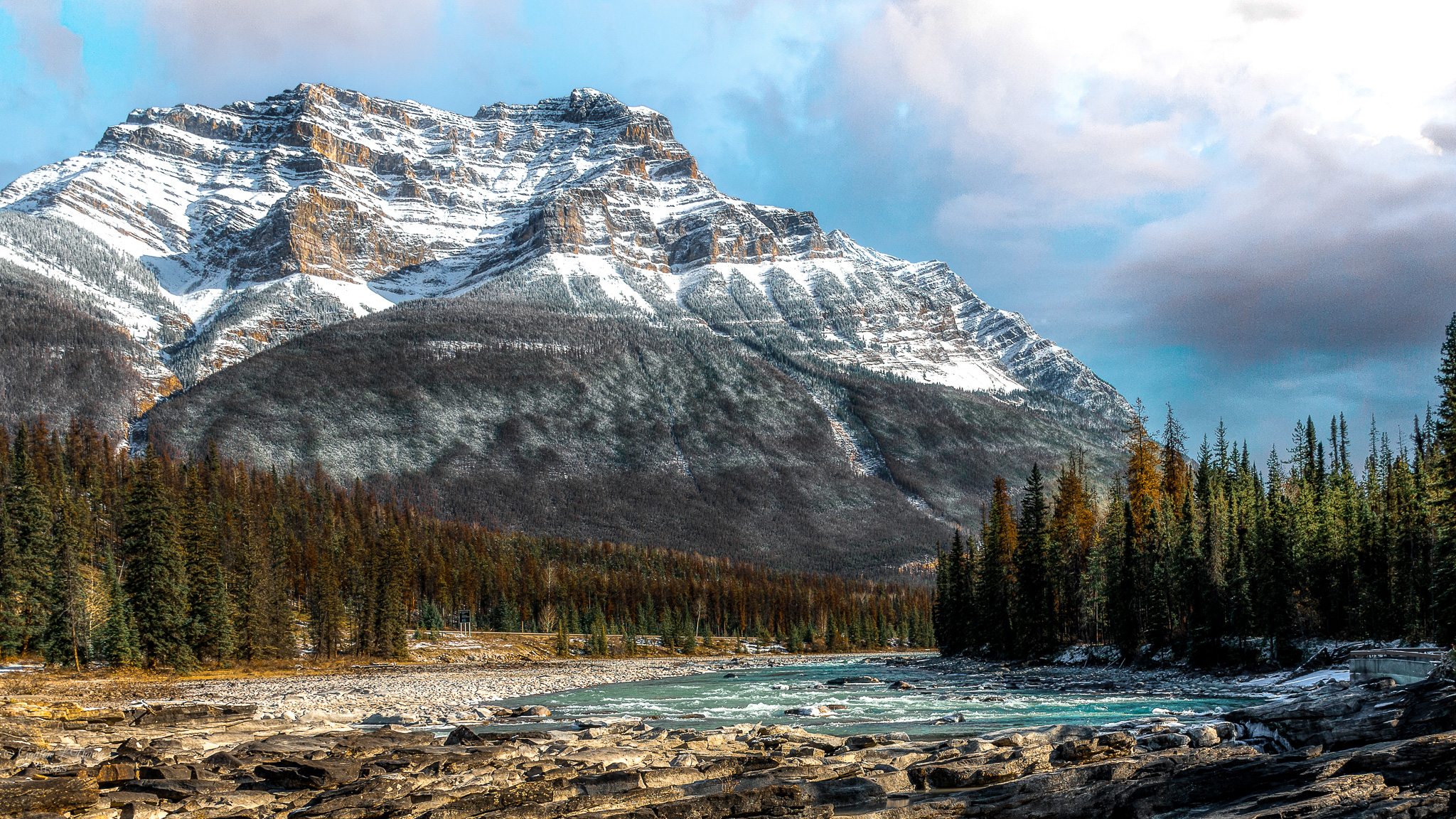
Mount Kerkeslin

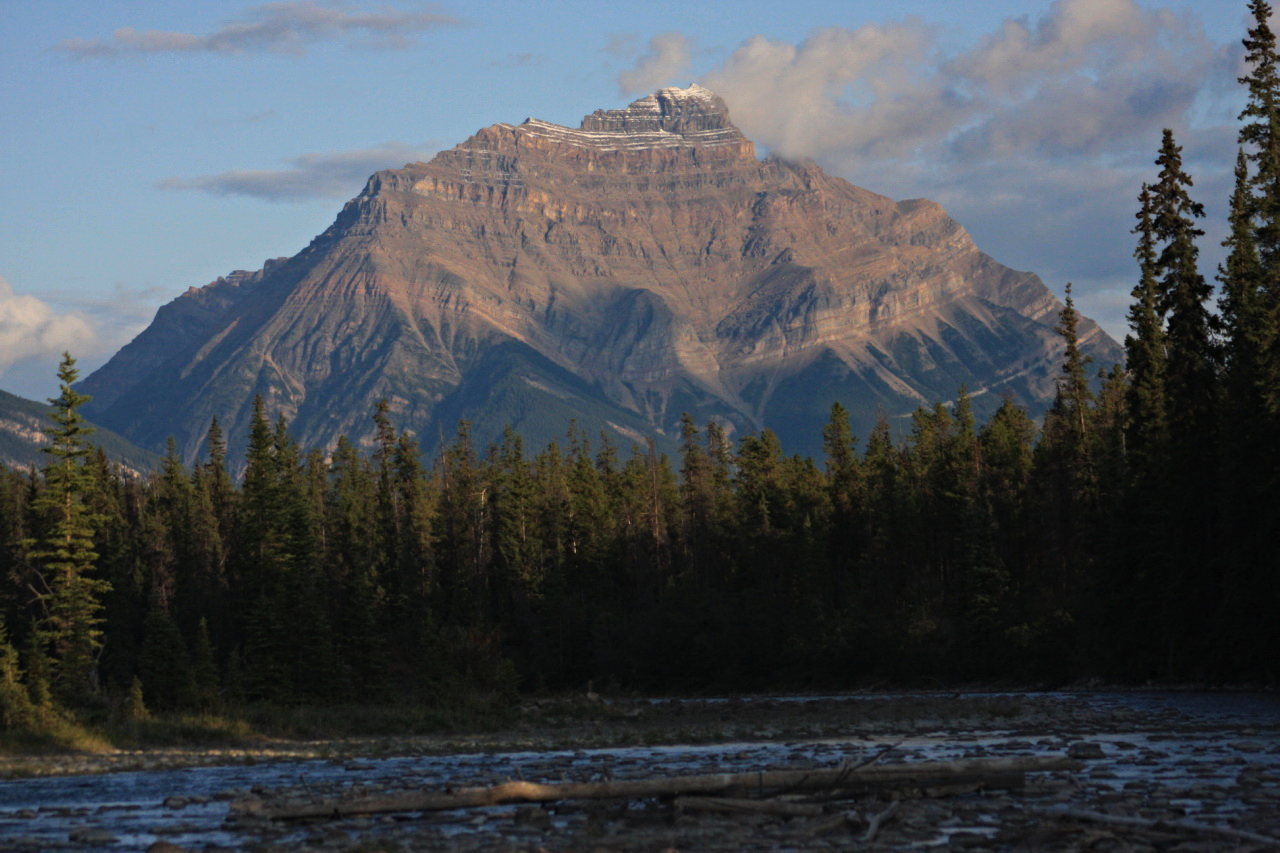
Mount Kerkeslin

== See also ==
- Geography of Alberta
