= Medicine Lake (Alberta) =

Lake in Jasper National Park, Alberta, Canada

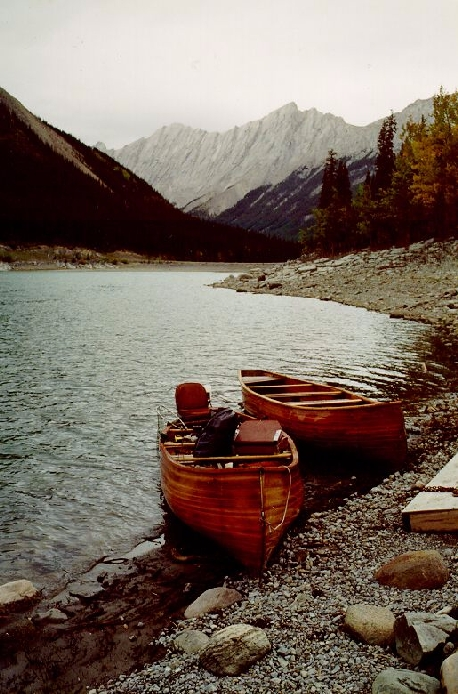
- Cedar strip freighter canoes (1991)

- Location within Alberta
- Location: Jasper National Park, Alberta
- Coordinates: 52°51′27″N 117°45′35″W
- Basin countries: Canada
- Max. length: 7 km (4.3 mi)

Medicine Lake is located within Jasper National Park, Alberta, Canada, approximately 20 km (12 mi) southeast of the townsite of Jasper, Alberta. It is approximately 7 km (4.3 mi) long and is a relatively shallow lake. The lake is part of the Maligne Valley watershed, which is mainly glacial-fed.

== Geology ==
Medicine Lake is a geologic anomaly in the sense that it is not actually a lake but rather an area in which the Maligne River (flowing from Maligne Lake into the Athabasca River) backs up and suddenly disappears underground as a losing stream. During the summer months, during intensified meltwater runoff, the lake (which during the winter months is a meandering frozen river) fills to levels that fluctuate over time and with the runoff events. Much like a bathtub that is filled too fast for it to drain, it becomes laden with water (lake) until it can slowly drain as the tap flow (runoff) is reduced (river). The underground system is extensive, and during the 1970s, researchers used a biodegradable dye to determine the underground river's extent. The dye showed up in many of the lakes and rivers in the area to the point where it became clear that the underground system was one of the most extensive in the world.

== Fauna ==
Medicine Lake also boasts a healthy population of rainbow trout and brook trout, and is a fly fisherman's paradise.

Wildlife is surprisingly abundant along this high-altitude lake. Grizzly bear, black bear, mule deer, boreal woodland caribou, northern Rocky Mountain wolf, western moose, and bighorn sheep are some of the larger mammals that frequent the lake area during the summer season. Bald eagles, and osprey also frequent the area and live off the fish populations.

== Gallery ==
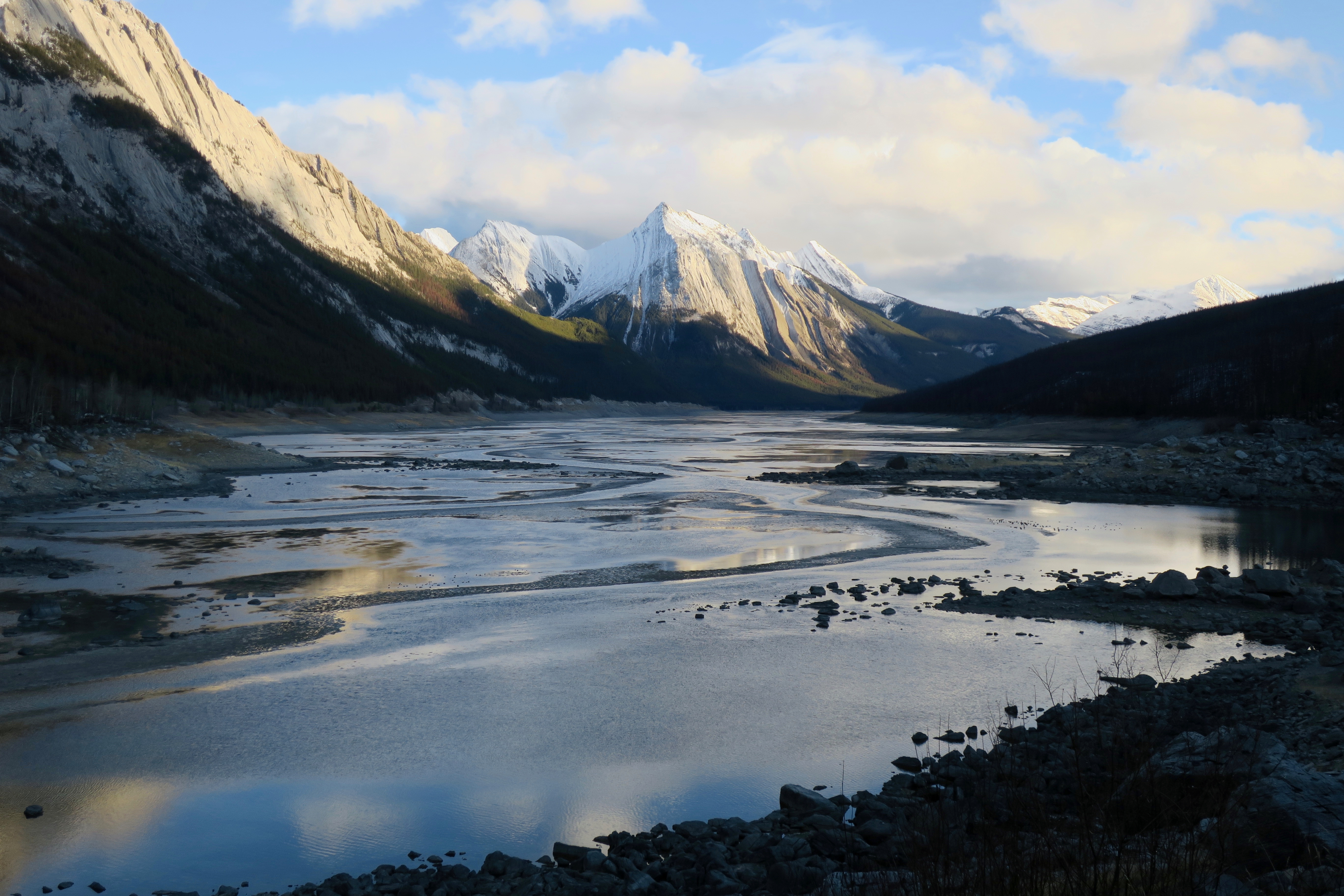
Medicine Lake in November

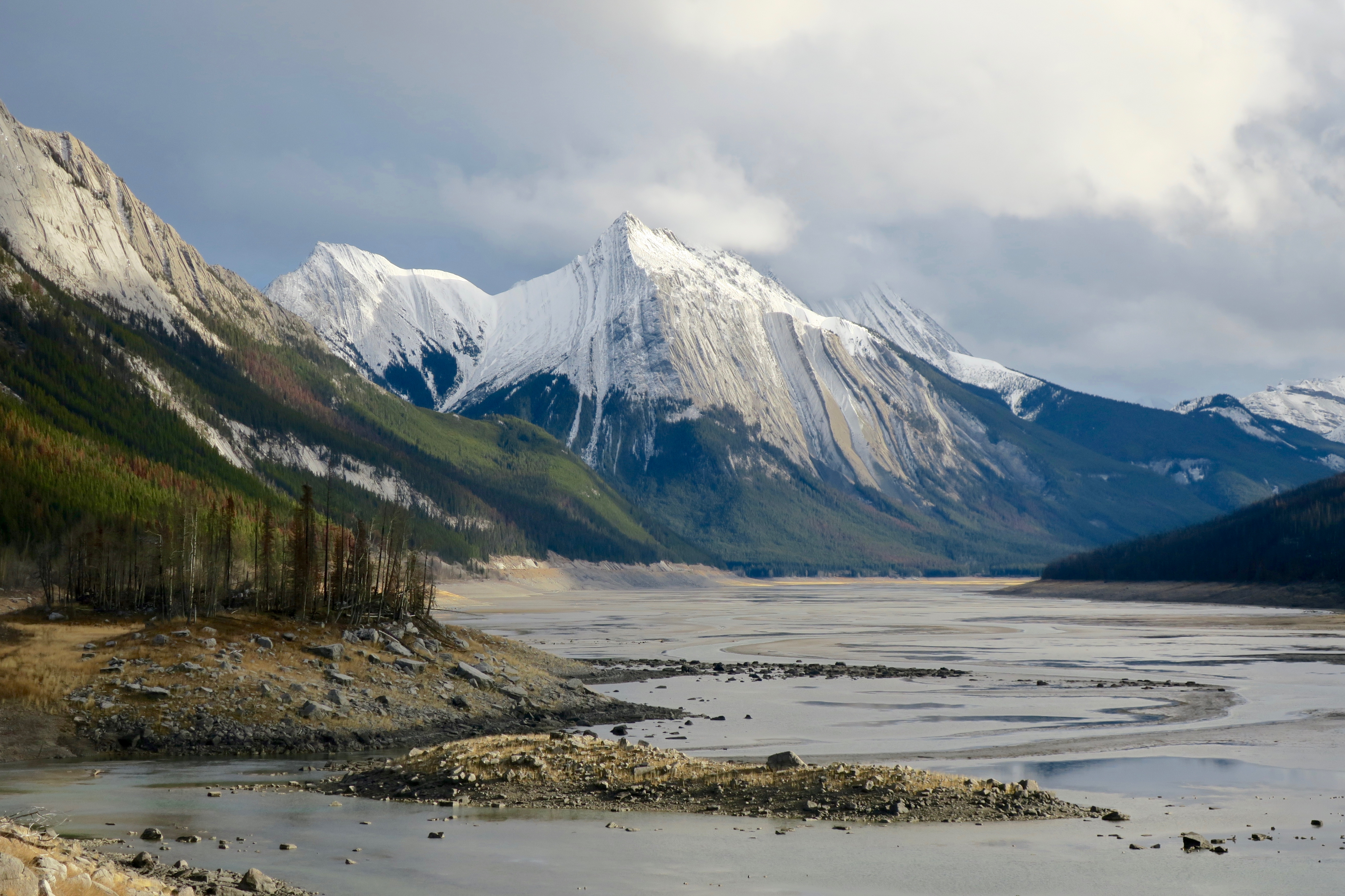
Medicine Lake in November

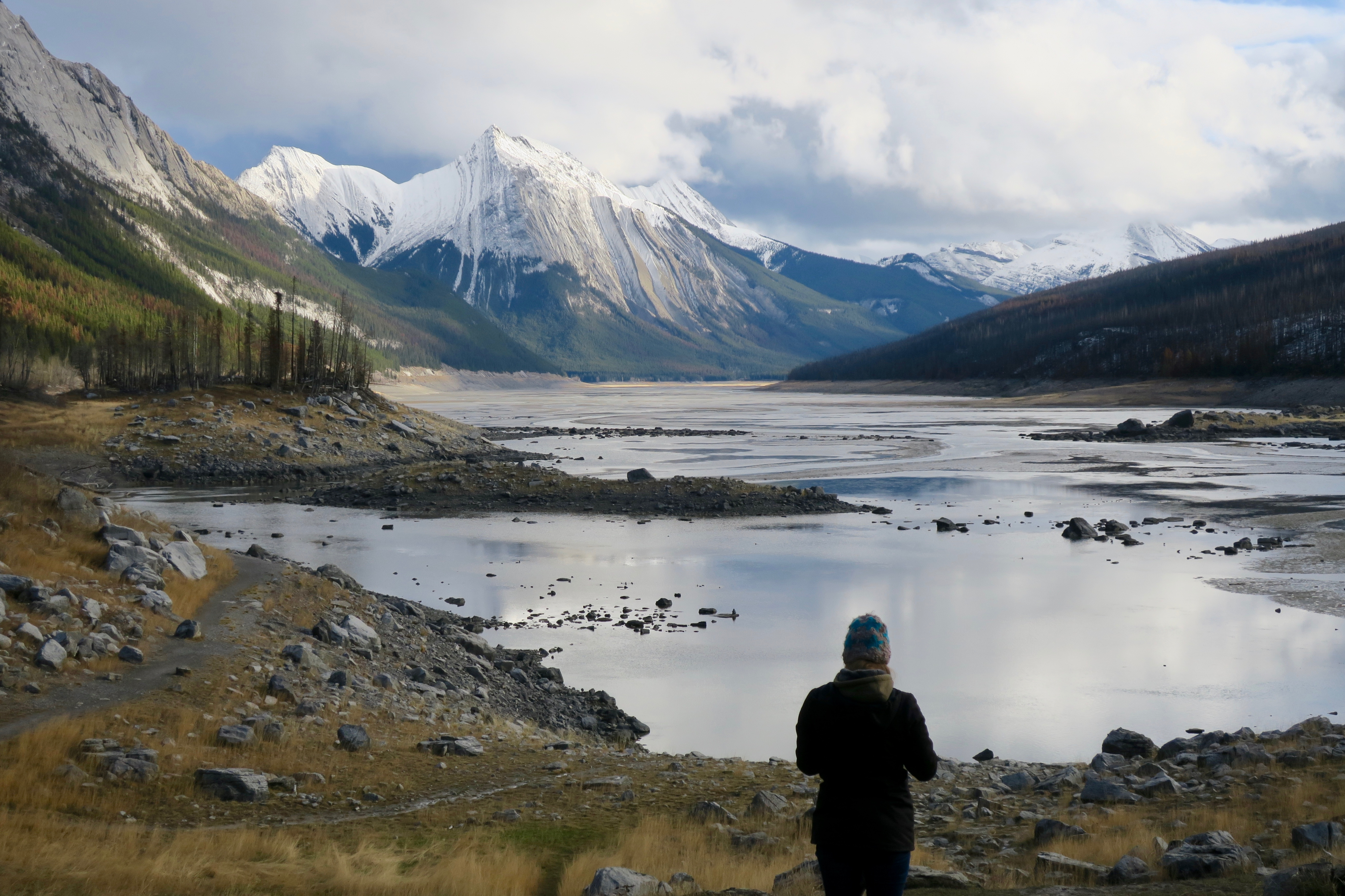
Medicine Lake in November

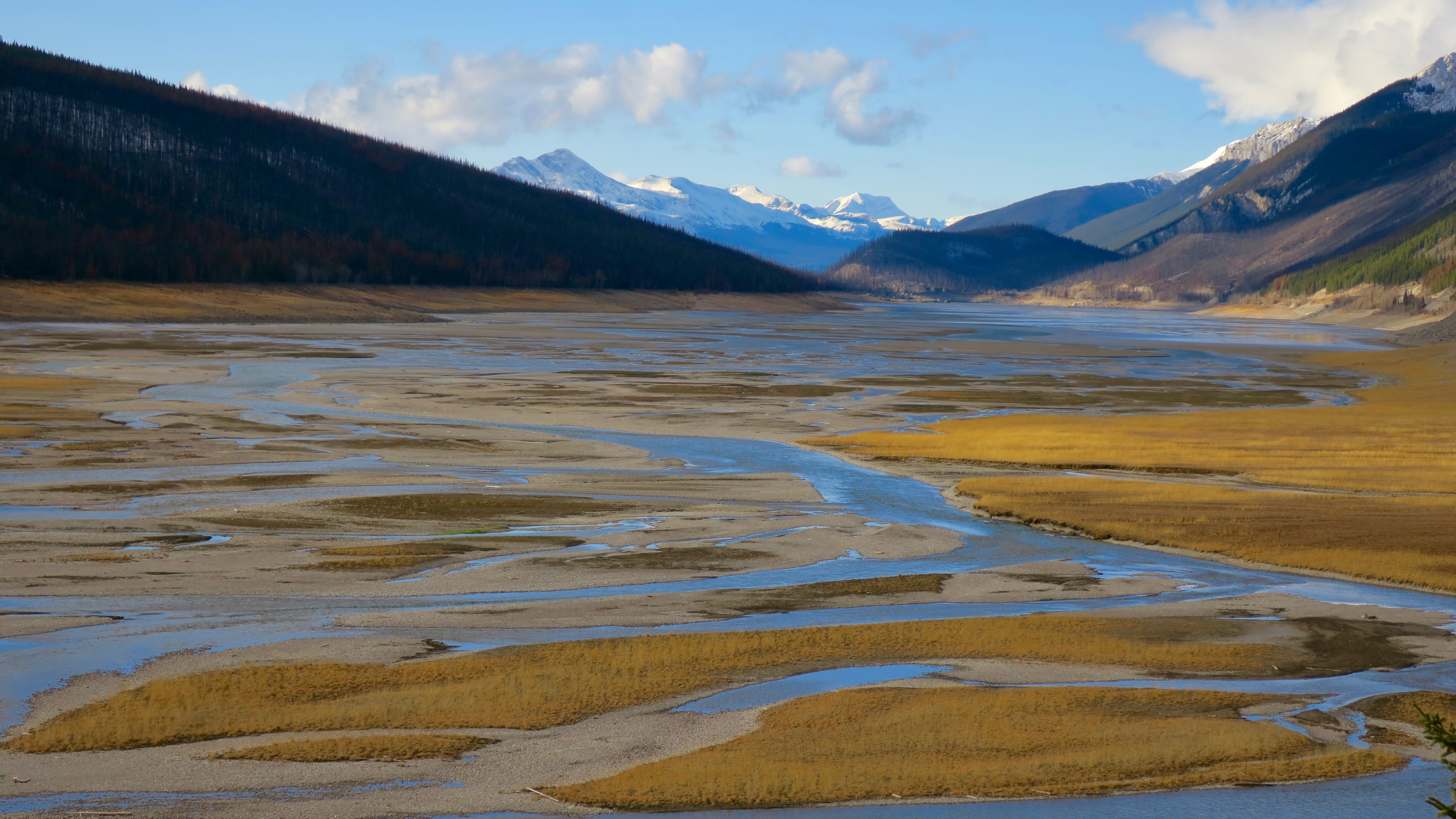
Medicine Lake in November

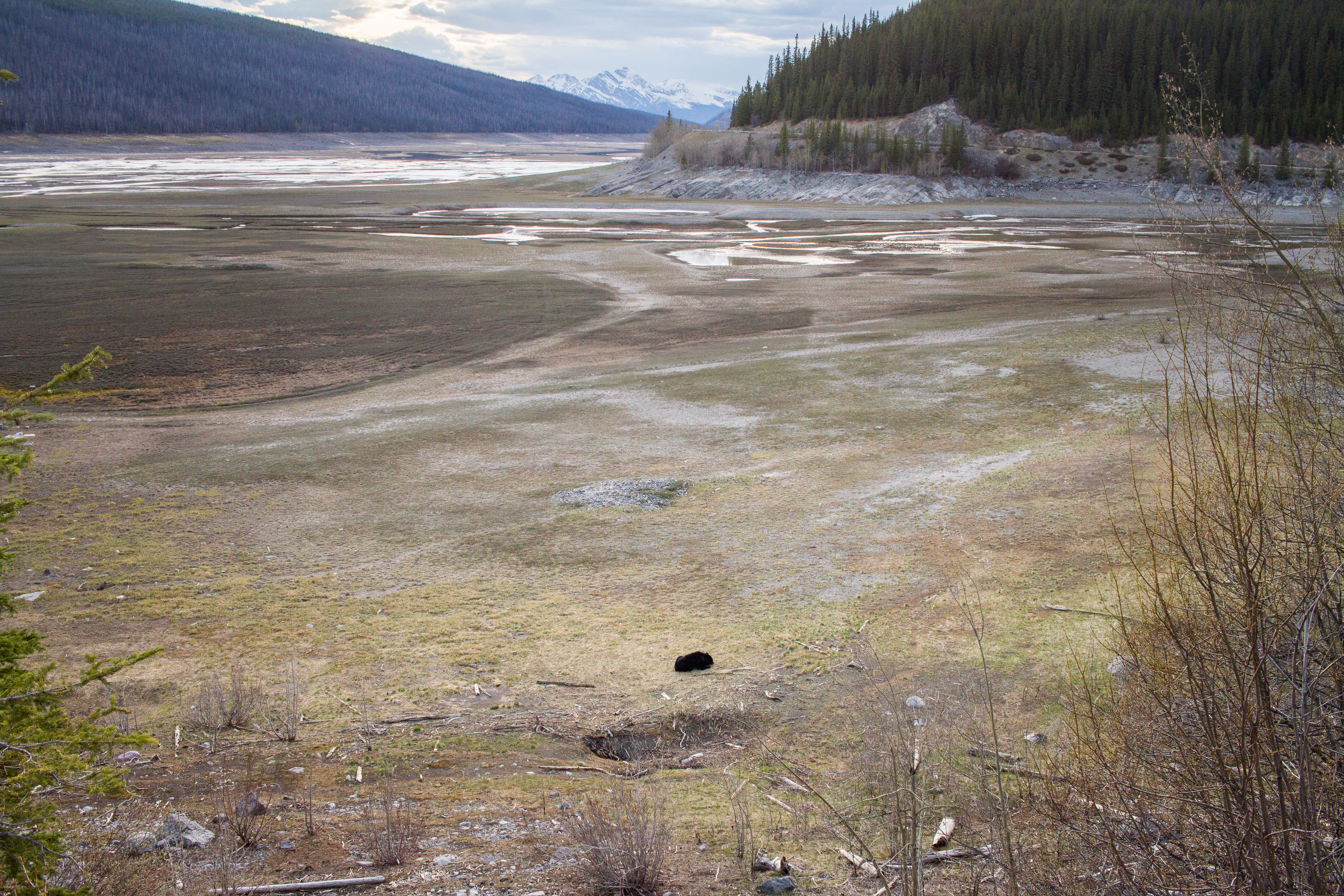
A black bear sleeps in front of a den that it has dug out of the dry lakebed of Medicine Lake in Jasper National Park, Alberta, Canada.

== See also ==
- Lakes of Alberta
