= Mount Warren (Alberta) =

Mountain in the country of Canada

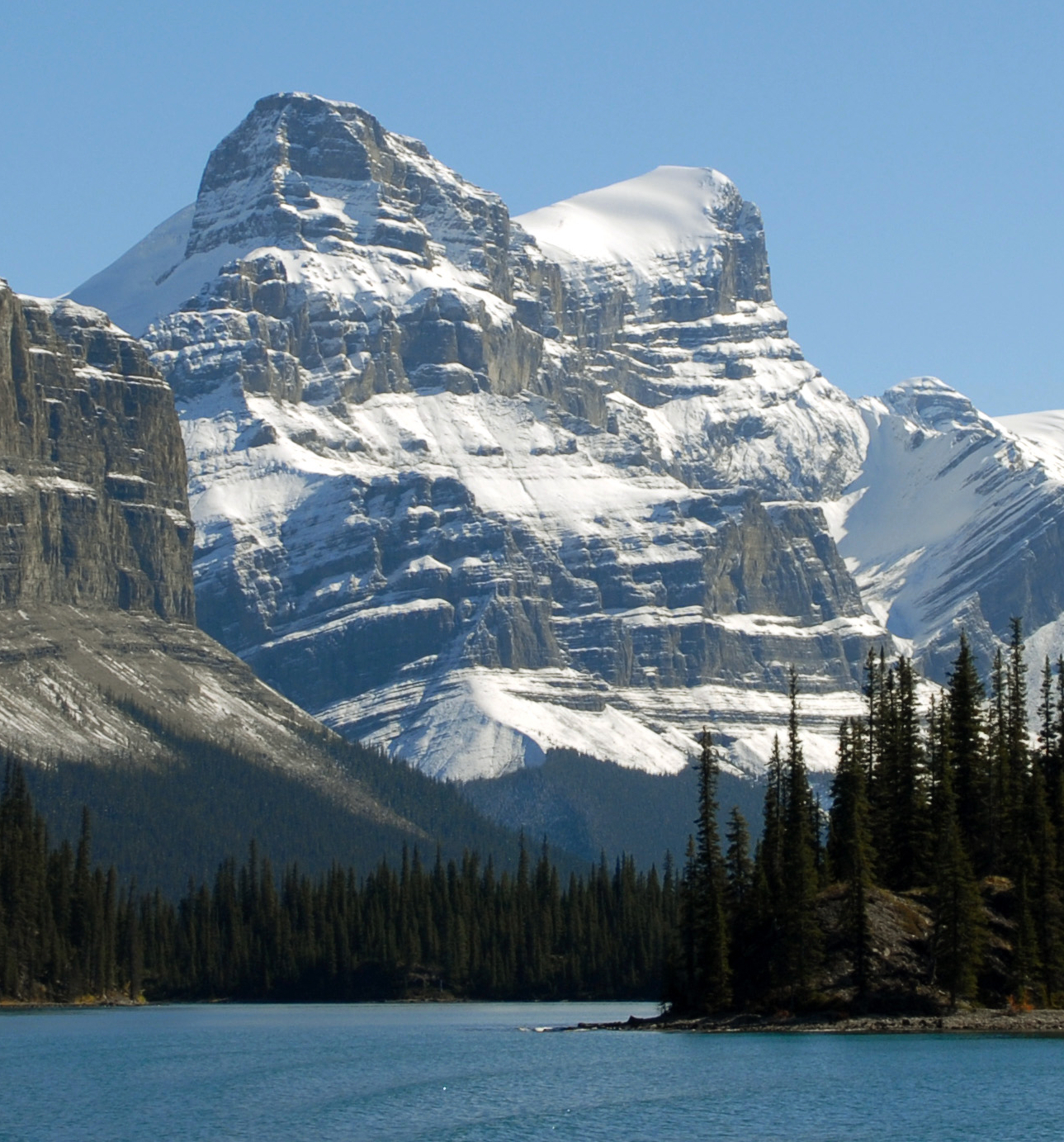
- Monkhead (left) and Mount Warren (right)

Highest point
- Elevation: 3,362 m (11,030 ft)
- Prominence: 412 m (1,352 ft)
- Parent peak: Mount Brazeau (3470 m)
- Listing: Mountains of Alberta
- Coordinates: 52°33′48″N 117°22′33″W

Geography
- Location within Alberta Location within Canada
- Location: Alberta, Canada
- Parent range: Le Grand Brazeau Range; Canadian Rockies
- Topo map: NTS 83C11 Southesk Lake

Geology
- Rock age: Cambrian / Ordovician
- Rock type: Sedimentary rock

Climbing
- First ascent: 1928 W.R. Hainsworth, M.M. Strumia

Mount Warren is a 3,362-metre (11,030-foot) mountain summit located at the southeast end of Maligne Lake in Jasper National Park, in the Canadian Rockies of Alberta, Canada. Mount Warren is often seen in the background of iconic calendar photos of Spirit Island and Maligne Lake. The mountain rises 1,690 metres (5,540 ft) in less than 4 kilometres (2.5 mi) from the lake giving it dramatic local relief. Mount Warren is situated at the northwest edge of the Brazeau Icefield, and its nearest higher peak is Mount Brazeau, 2.26 kilometres (1.40 miles) to the southeast. Monkhead is a lower secondary summit to the northwest of the true summit.

== History ==
The peak was first named by Mary Schäffer Warren in 1908, after William "Billy" Warren, her longtime friend and mountain guide who in 1915 would become her second husband. Mary "discovered" Maligne Lake and she named many of the mountains around it, including Mount Charlton, Mount Unwin, and Maligne Mountain. The mountain's name was officially adopted in 1946 by the Geographical Names Board of Canada.

The first ascent of Mount Warren was made in 1928 by W.R. Hainsworth and M.M. Strumia.

== Climate ==
Based on the Köppen climate classification, Mount Warren is located in a subarctic climate with cold, snowy winters, and mild summers. Temperatures can drop below −20 degrees Celsius (−4 degrees Fahrenheit) with wind chill factors below −30 °C (−22 °F). Precipitation runoff from Mount Warren drains into the Maligne River, which is a tributary of the Athabasca River. The months July through September offer the most favorable weather for viewing and climbing Mount Warren.

== See also ==
- List of mountains of Canada
- Geography of Alberta
