= Mount Paul =

Mountain in the country of Canada

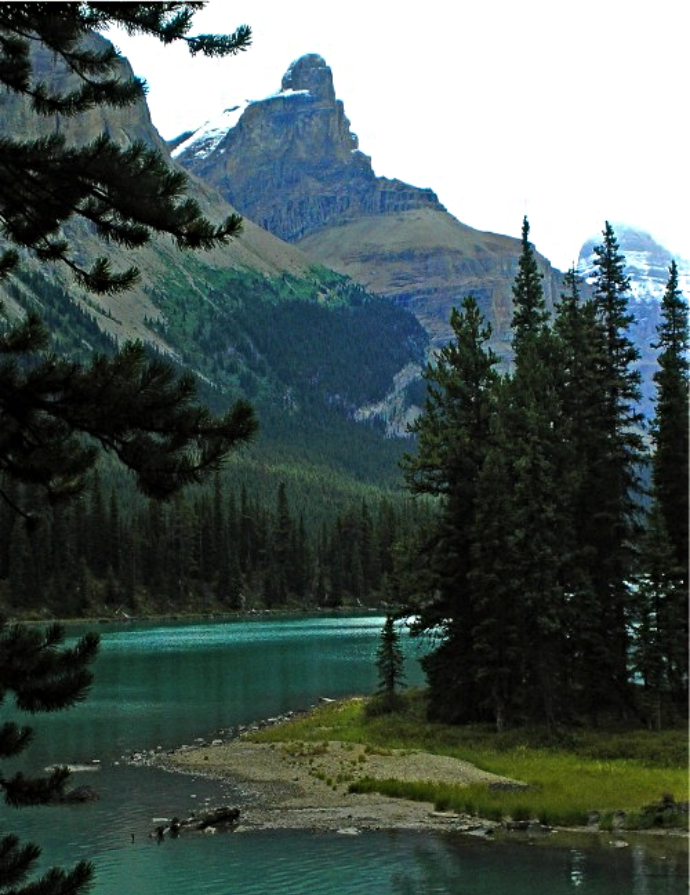
- Mount Paul seen from Samson Narrows on Maligne Lake

Highest point
- Elevation: 2,850 m (9,350 ft)
- Prominence: 175 m (574 ft)
- Parent peak: Maligne Mountain (3200 m)
- Listing: Mountains of Alberta
- Coordinates: 52°36′55″N 117°25′40″W

Geography
- Location within Alberta Location within Canada
- Location: Alberta, Canada
- Parent range: Queen Elizabeth Ranges; Canadian Rockies
- Topo map: NTS 83C11 Southesk Lake

Geology
- Rock age: Cambrian / Ordovician
- Rock type: Limestone

Climbing
- First ascent: 1928 by W.R. Hainsworth and M.M. Strumia

Mount Paul is a 2,850-metre (9,350 ft) mountain summit towering 1134 metres above the east shore of Maligne Lake in Jasper National Park, in the Canadian Rockies of Alberta, Canada. The nearest higher peak is Maligne Mountain, 1.81 km (1.12 mi) to the north-northwest. Mount Paul is situated north of Monkhead and they are often seen together in the background of iconic calendar photos of Spirit Island and Maligne Lake.

== History ==
Mount Paul was named by Mary Schäffer after Paul Sharples, Mary's nine year old nephew who accompanied her on her second expedition to Maligne Lake in 1911. Mary originally referred to this mountain as The Thumb during her first successful expedition to Maligne Lake in 1908.

The first ascent of Mount Paul was made in 1928 by W.R. Hainsworth and M.M. Strumia This mountain's name was officially adopted in 1946 by the Geographical Names Board of Canada.

== Climate ==
Based on the Köppen climate classification, Mount Paul is located in a subarctic climate with cold, snowy winters, and mild summers. Temperatures can drop below −20 °C with wind chill factors below −30 °C. Precipitation runoff from Mount Paul drains west into Maligne Lake, thence into the Maligne River which is a tributary of the Athabasca River.

== Gallery ==
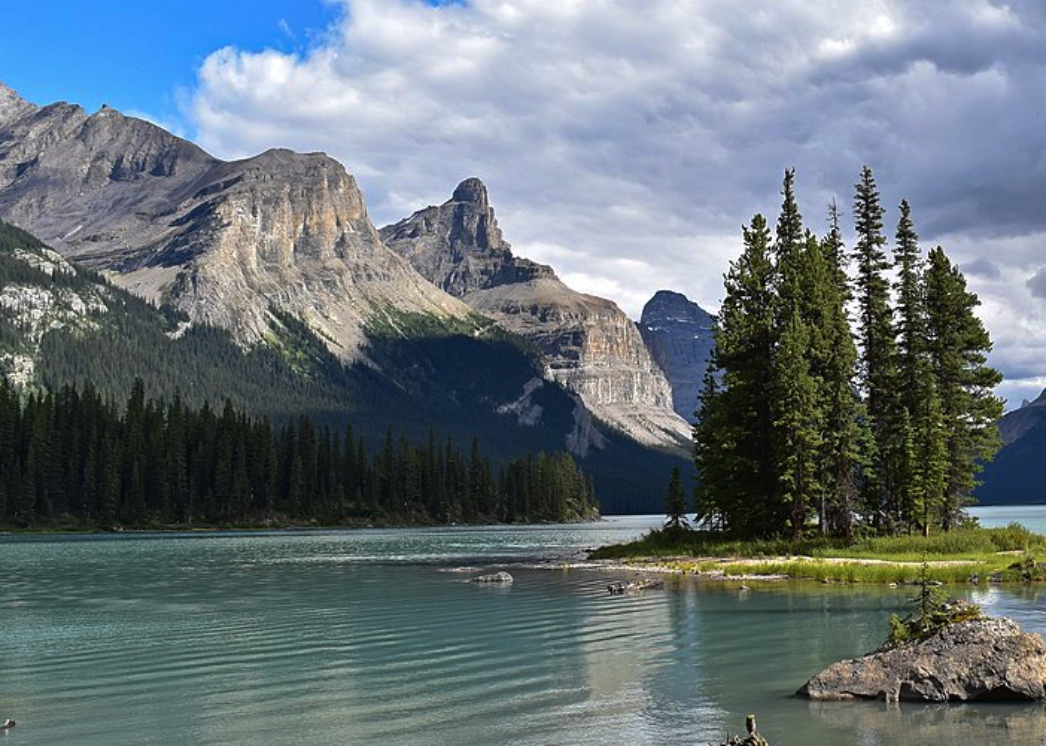
Mount Paul centered

== See also ==
- List of mountains of Canada
