= Maligne Mountain =

Mountain in Alberta, Canada

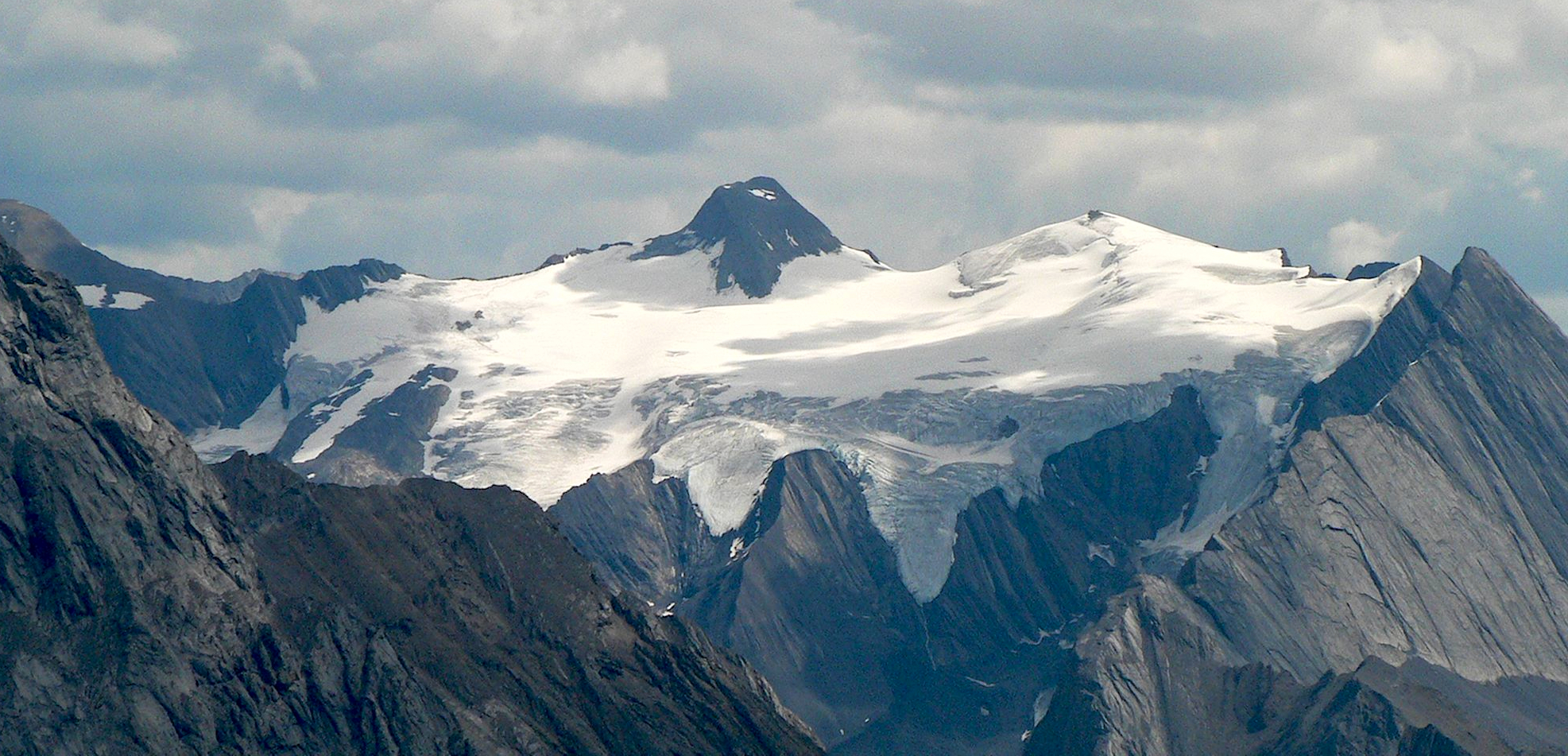
- Maligne Mountain with Maligne Glacier

Highest point
- Elevation: 3,200 m (10,500 ft)
- Prominence: 625 m (2,051 ft)
- Parent peak: Mount Brazeau (3470 m)
- Listing: Mountains of Alberta
- Coordinates: 52°39′06″N 117°23′59″W

Geography
- Location within Alberta Location within Canada
- Country: Canada
- Province: Alberta
- Protected area: Jasper National Park
- Parent range: Queen Elizabeth Ranges; Canadian Rockies
- Topo map: NTS 83C11 Southesk Lake

Geology
- Rock age: Cambrian / Ordovician
- Rock type: Sedimentary rock

Climbing
- First ascent: 1930 W.R. Hainsworth, J.F. Lehmann, M.M. Strumia, N.D. Waffl

Maligne Mountain is a 3,200-metre (10,500-foot) multi-peak massif located east of Maligne Lake in Jasper National Park, in the Canadian Rockies of Alberta, Canada. Maligne Mountain is surrounded by glaciers, and its nearest higher peak is Monkhead, 7.8 km (4.8 mi) to the south.

== History ==
The peak was first named by Mary Schäffer in 1911 because she thought one peak should bear the name of Maligne Lake. Mary "discovered" Maligne Lake and she named many of the mountains around it, including Mount Charlton, Mount Unwin, and Mount Warren. The mountain's name was officially adopted in 1946 by the Geographical Names Board of Canada.

The first ascent of Maligne Mountain was made in 1930 by W.R. Hainsworth, J.F. Lehmann, M.M. Strumia, and N.D. Waffl.

== Climate ==
Based on the Köppen climate classification, Maligne Mountain is located in a subarctic climate with cold, snowy winters, and mild summers. Temperatures can drop below −20 °C (−4 °F) with wind chill factors below −30 °C (−22 °F).

== Gallery ==
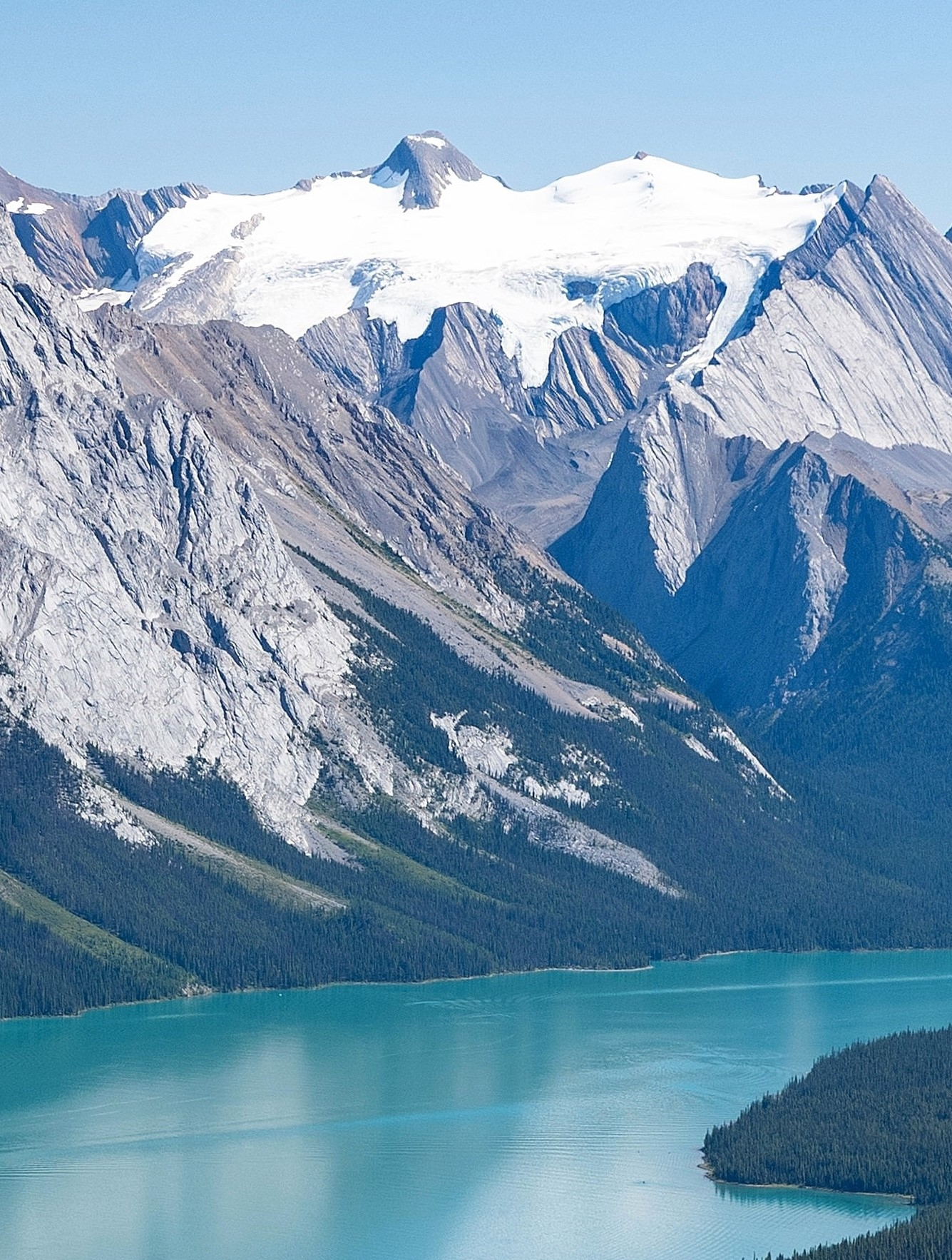
Maligne Mountain and Maligne Lake

== See also ==
- List of mountains in the Canadian Rockies
- Geography of Alberta
