= Mount Unwin =

Mountain in Alberta, Canada

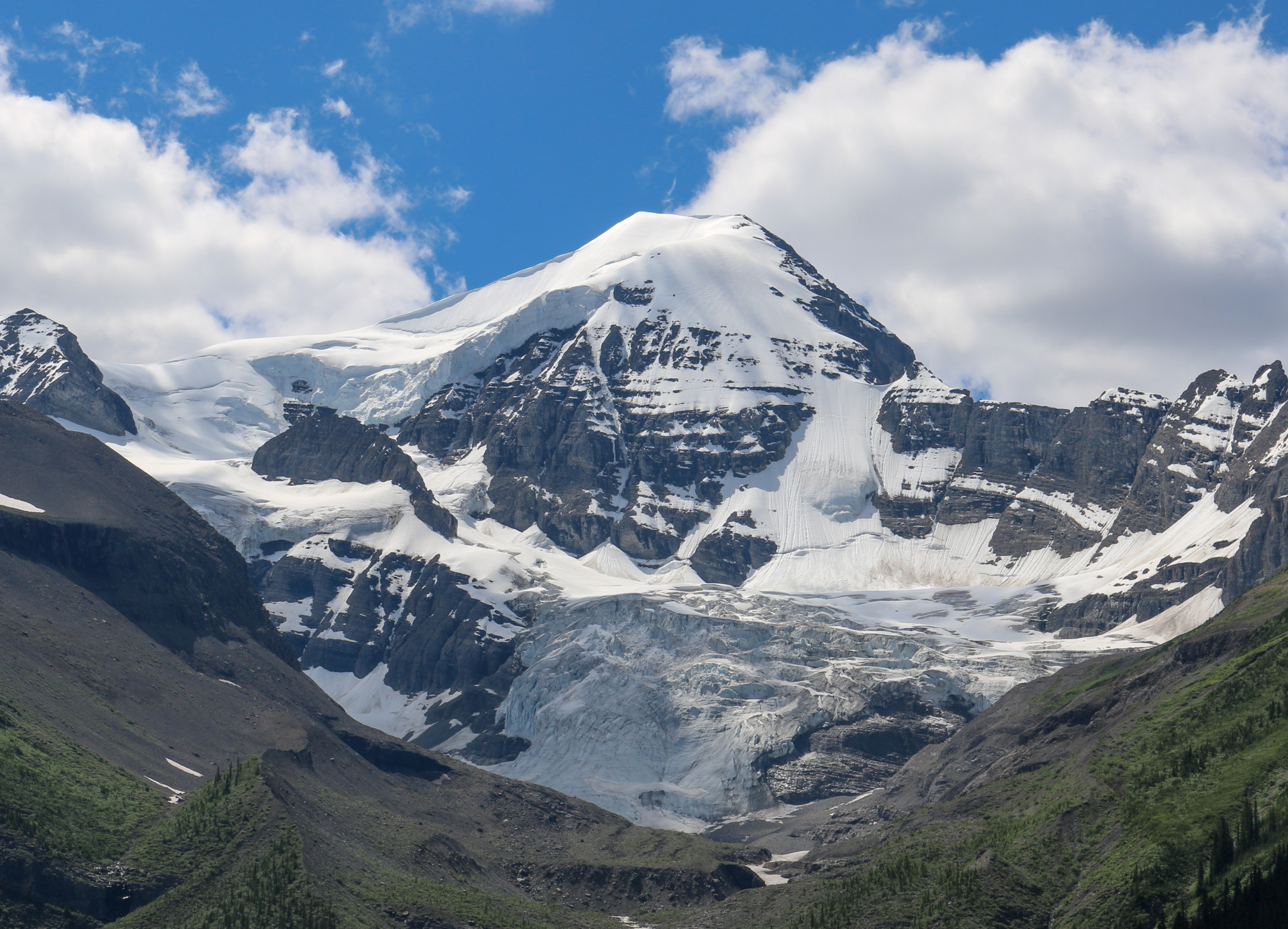
- Mount Unwin seen from Maligne Lake

Highest point
- Elevation: 3,268 m (10,722 ft)
- Prominence: 818 m (2,684 ft)
- Parent peak: Mount Brazeau (3470 m)
- Listing: Mountains of Alberta
- Coordinates: 52°36′39″N 117°31′42″W

Geography
- Location within Alberta Location within Canada
- Country: Canada
- Province: Alberta
- Protected area: Jasper National Park
- Parent range: Queen Elizabeth Ranges; Canadian Rockies
- Topo map: NTS 83C12 Athabasca Falls

Climbing
- First ascent: 1908 Sidney Unwin
- Easiest route: North Glacier II

Mount Unwin is a 3,268-metre (10,722-foot) mountain summit located on the west side of Maligne Lake in Jasper National Park, in the Queen Elizabeth Range of the Canadian Rockies of Alberta, Canada. Its nearest higher peak is Mount Brazeau, 13.0 km (8.1 mi) to the east-southeast.

== History ==
The peak was named in 1908 by Mary Schäffer for her guide and companion, Sidney Unwin, who had climbed the peak in an effort to locate the elusive Maligne Lake which she was trying to find. Mary named many of the mountains around the lake, including Mount Charlton, Maligne Mountain, and Mount Warren.

The mountain's name was made official in 1947 by the Geographical Names Board of Canada.

== Climate ==
Based on the Köppen climate classification, Mount Unwin is located in a subarctic climate zone with cold, snowy winters, and mild summers. Temperatures can drop below −20 °C (−4 °F) with wind chill factors below −30 °C (−22 °F). Precipitation runoff from Mount Unwin drains down the Maligne River, which is a tributary of the Athabasca River.

== Gallery ==
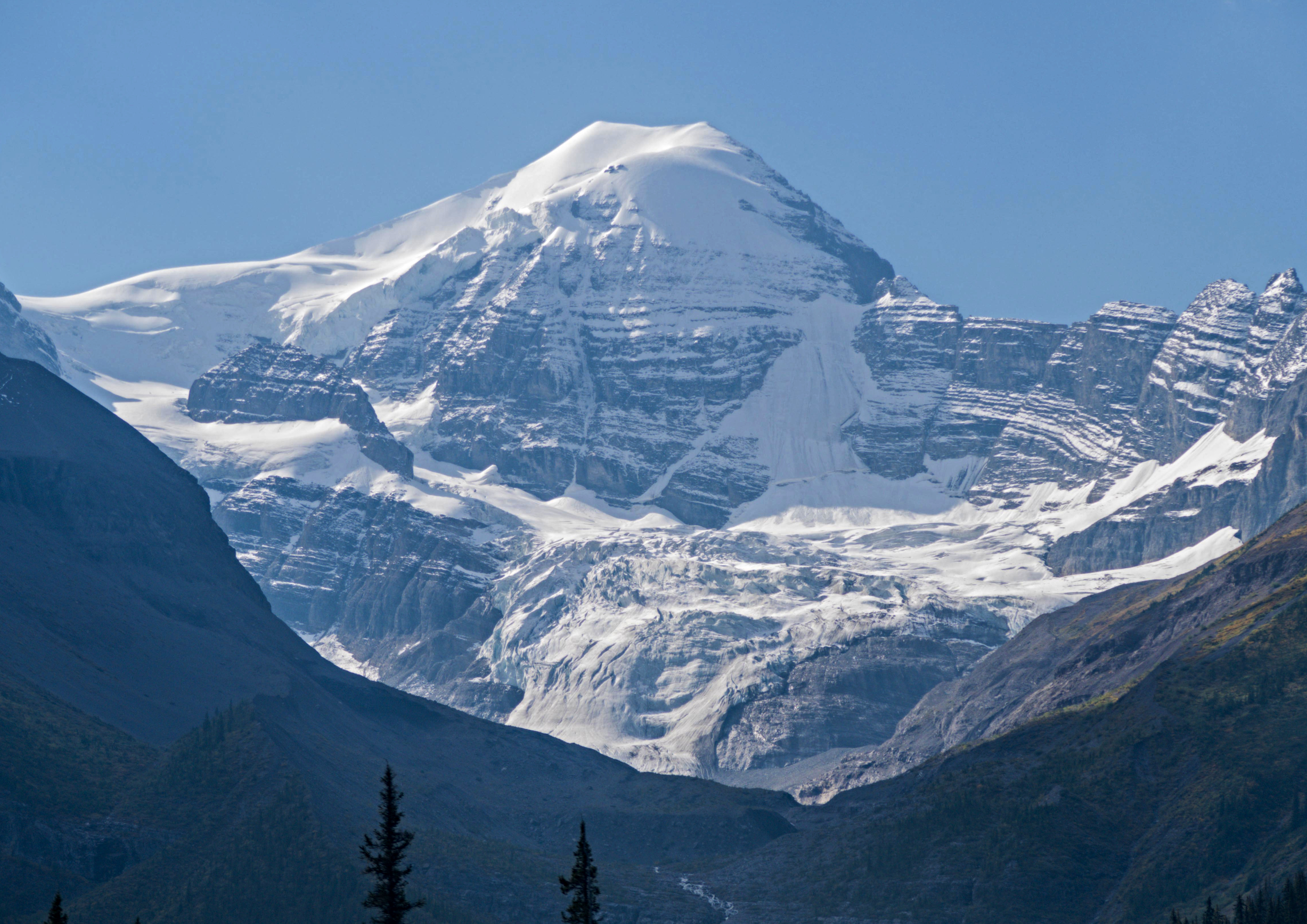
Mount Unwin

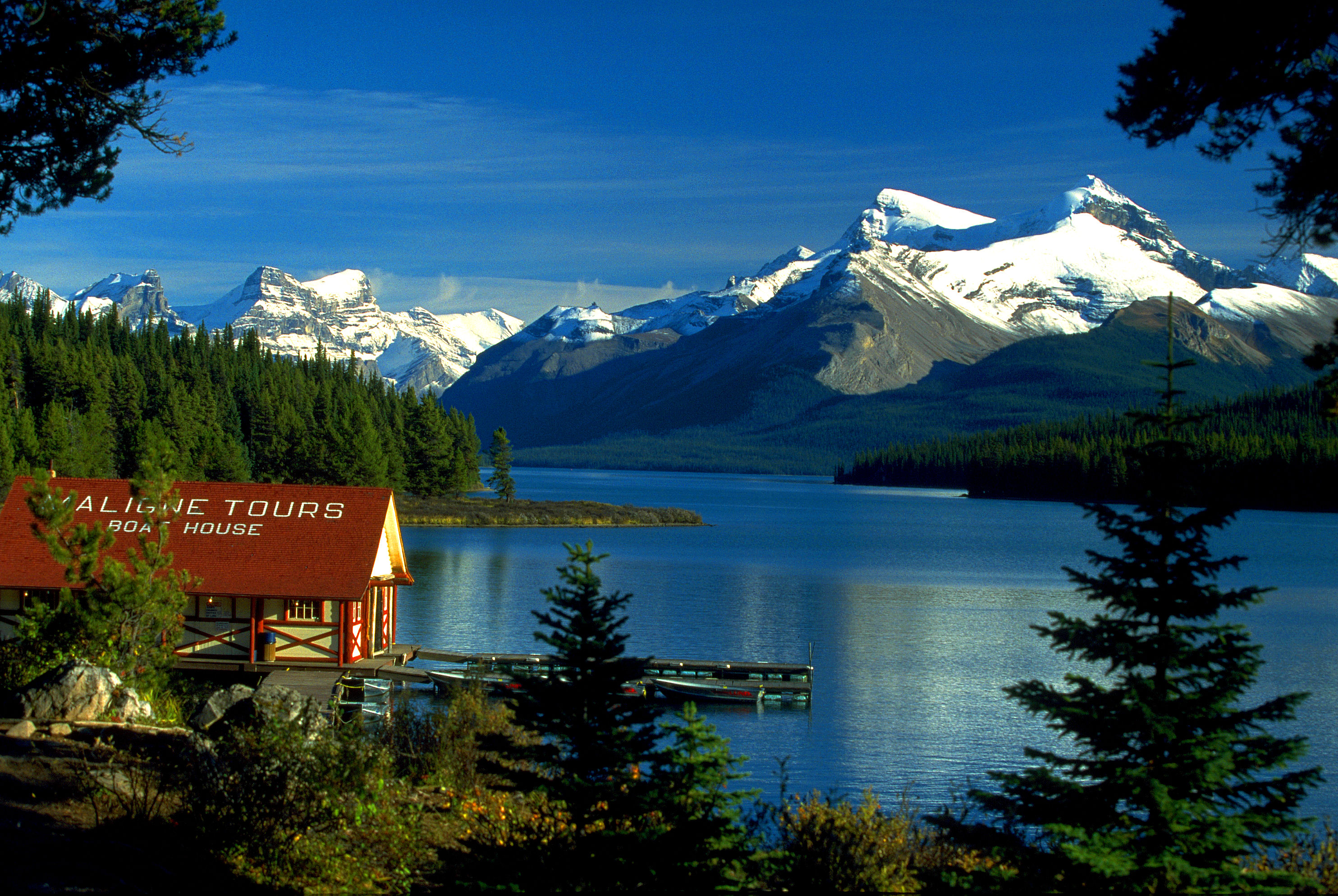
Maligne Lake with Mount Charlton and Mount Unwin to the right

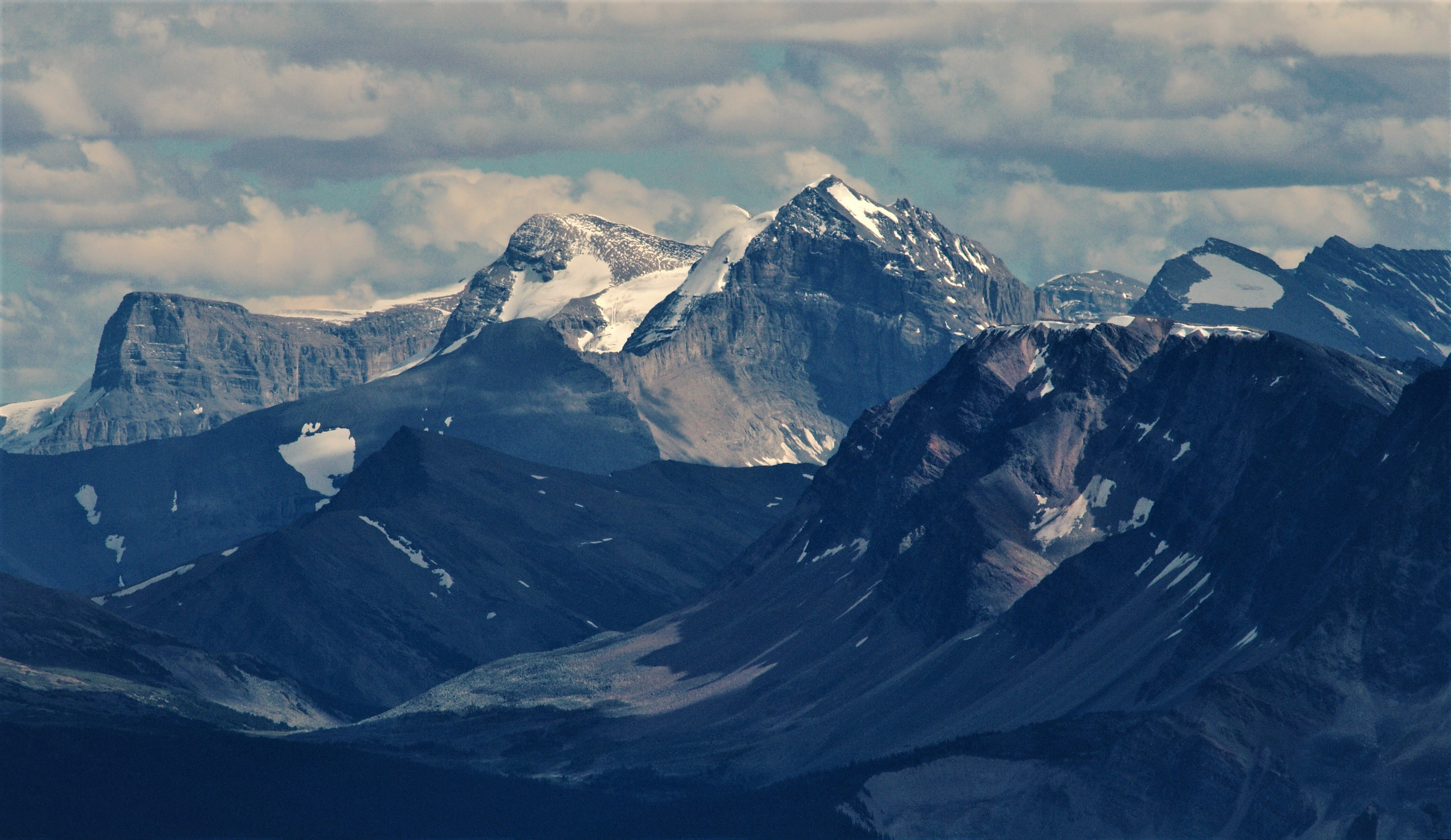
Monkhead, Mt. Charlton, Mt. Unwin from The Whistlers
