= Opal Peak =

Mountain in Alberta, Canada

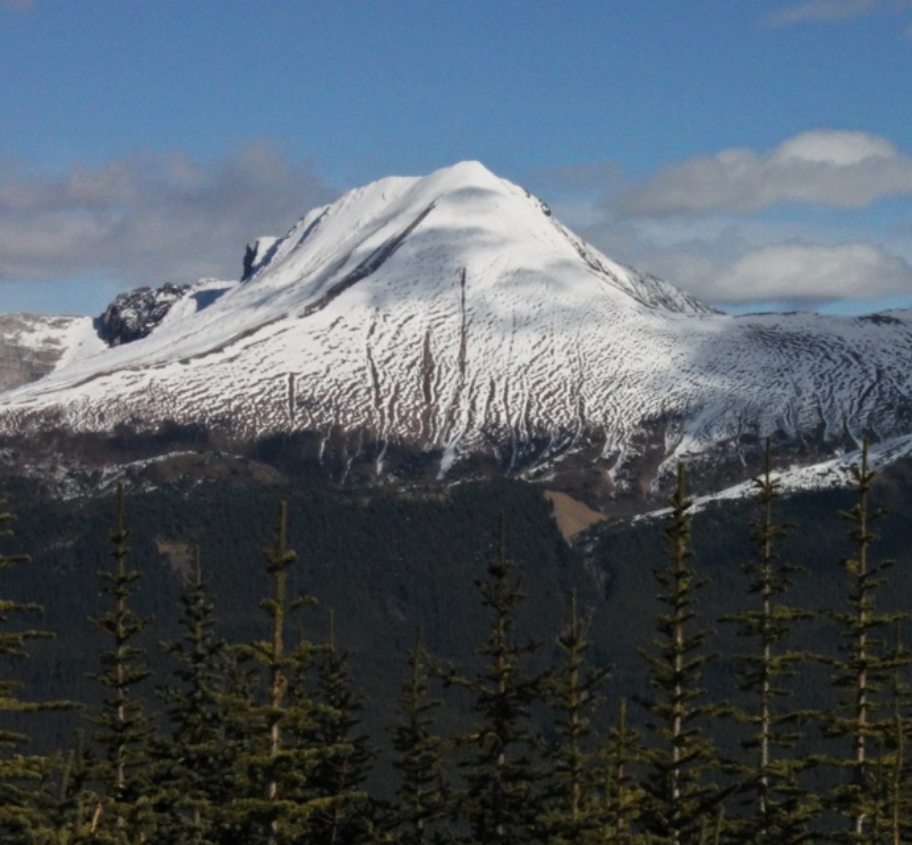
- Opal Peak seen from Bald Hills

Highest point
- Elevation: 2,840 m (9,320 ft)
- Prominence: 385 m (1,263 ft)
- Listing: Mountains of Alberta
- Coordinates: 52°45′10″N 117°35′40″W

Geography
- Location within Alberta Location within Canada
- Location: Jasper National Park; Alberta, Canada
- Parent range: Queen Elizabeth Ranges; Canadian Rockies
- Topo map: NTS 83C13 Medicine Lake

Geology
- Rock type: Sedimentary rock

Climbing
- Easiest route: trail and scrambling

Opal Peak is a 2,840-metre (9,320-foot) mountain summit located northeast of the northern end of Maligne Lake in Jasper National Park, in the Canadian Rockies of Alberta, Canada. It is situated in the Opal Hills, west of Opal Lake and 5.44 km (3.38 mi) northwest of Leah Peak.

== Climate ==
Based on the Köppen climate classification, Opal Peak is located in a subarctic climate zone with cold, snowy winters, and mild summers. Temperatures can drop below -20 °C, with wind chill factors below -30 °C. Precipitation runoff from Opal Peak drains west into the Maligne River, which is a tributary of the Athabasca River.

== Gallery ==
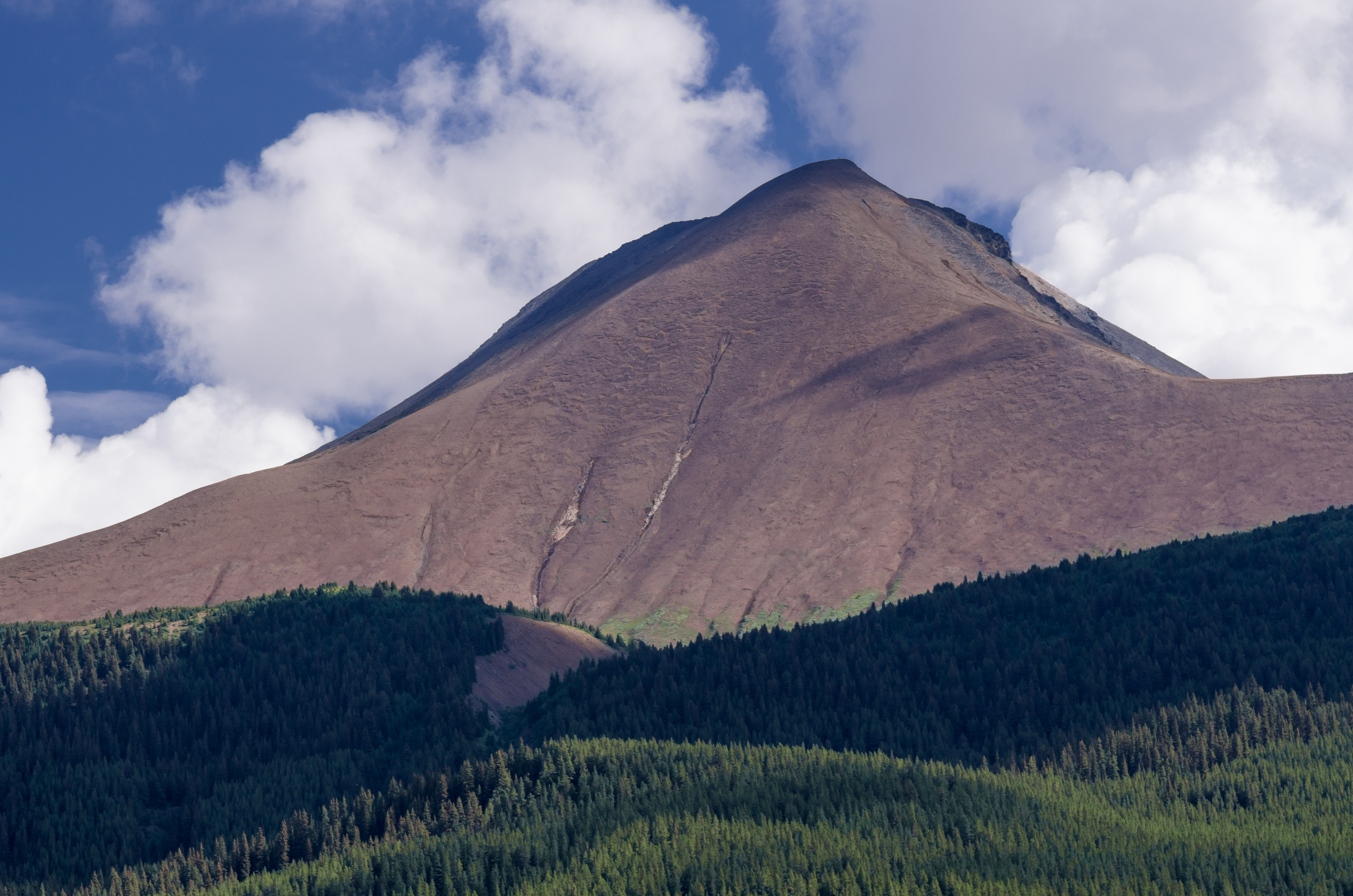
Southwest aspect

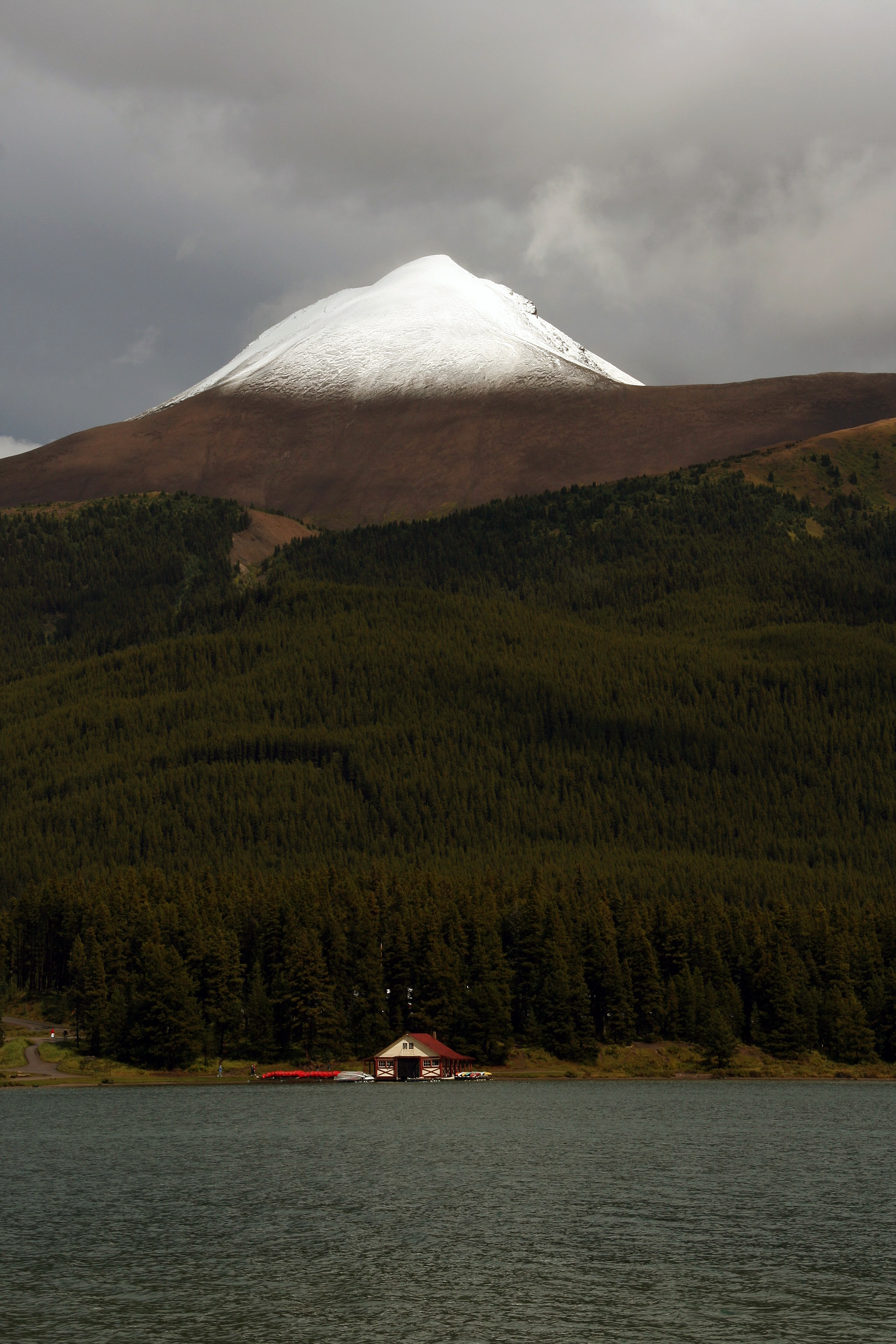
Opal Peak from Maligne Lake

== See also ==
- List of mountains of Canada
- Geology of the Rocky Mountains
