= Mount Charlton =

Mount Charlton may refer to:

- Mount Charlton (Canada), a summit in Alberta
- Mount Charlton, Queensland, a locality in the Mackay Region, Queensland, Australia
