= Spirit Island =

Spirit Island may refer to:

- Spirit Island (Alberta)
- Spirit Island (Minnesota), an island in Lake Minnetonka
- Spirit Island (board game)
