= Queen Elizabeth Range =

Queen Elizabeth Range may refer to:

- Queen Elizabeth Range (Antarctica)
- Queen Elizabeth Ranges in Canada
