= Charles Schäffer =

American physician and botanist (1838–1903)

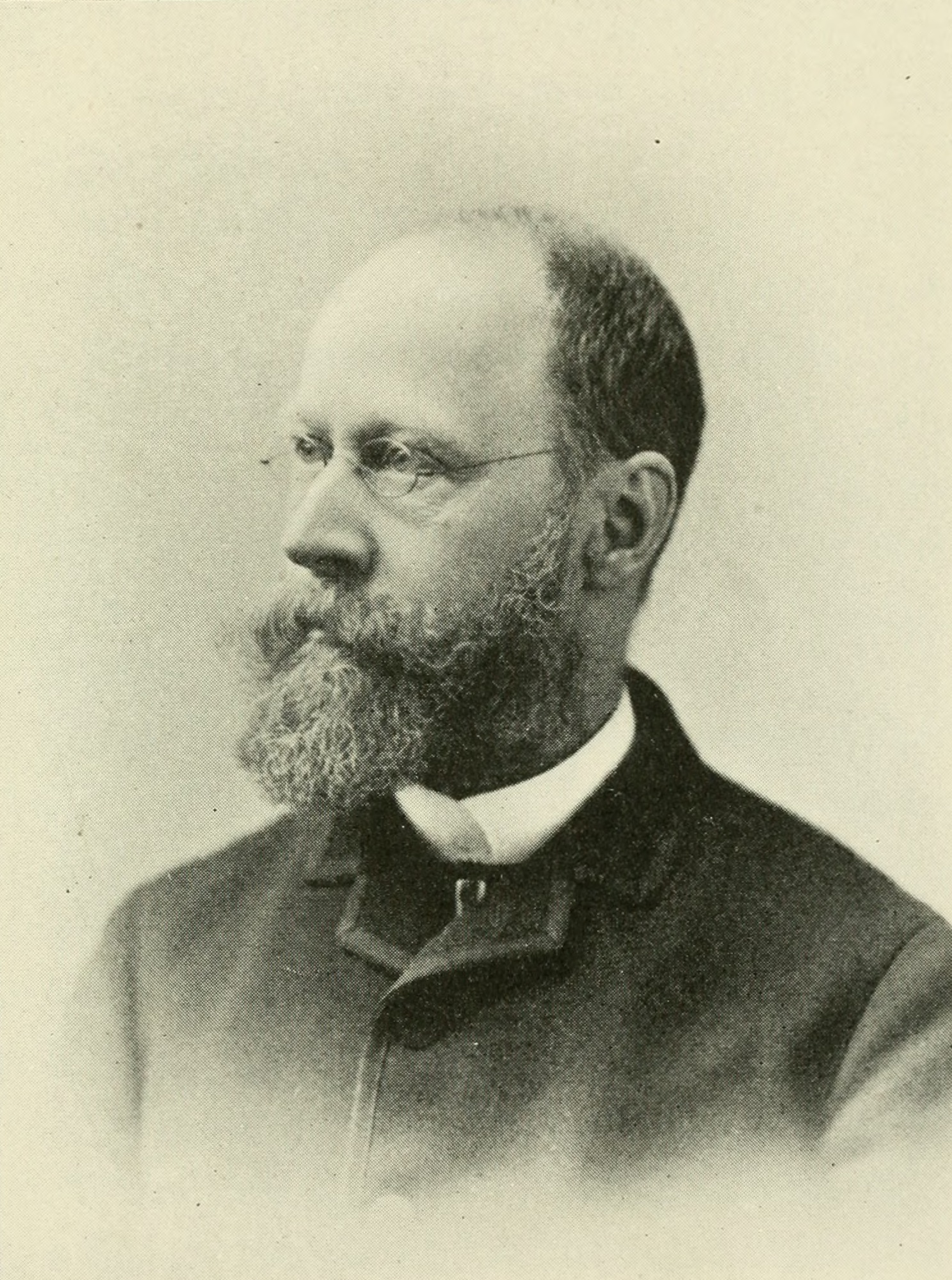
Charles Schäffer (1838–1903)

Charles Schäffer (February 4, 1838 – November 23, 1903) was an American physician and botanist from Philadelphia, Pennsylvania. His father, Charles Schäffer, was a wholesale druggist and his mother was Priscilla Morgan, daughter of Stacey K. Potts, an old Philadelphia merchant. His early education was received from a private tutor, who prepared him for the University of Pennsylvania where he graduated in medicine in 1859. He served in the Chester Military Hospital in 1863 and was attending physician at the Mission Hospital and Dispensary from 1874 until its close in 1880. He became interested in the flora of Philadelphia and vicinity and later extended his collecting trips to the Selkirk Mountains of British Columbia amassing a collection of photographs and plants of that region.

In 1862, Schäffer married Martha Potts; she died in 1878. In 1882, he married Ellen Zook; she died in 1884. In 1890, he married Mary Townsend Sharples, who was his companion on his explorations and was deeply interested in his scientific work. Under his guidance, Sharples reproduced the rarer plants in watercolor and photography; these were published after Schäffer's death, the illustrations being Mrs. Schäffer's and the letter-press that of the botanist Stewardson Brown under the title Alpine Flora of the Canadian Rocky Mountains (1907), published by G. P. Putnam's Sons, New York. Schäffer was a Fellow of the College of Physicians of Philadelphia, and of the Geological Society of America, and was a member of the Philadelphia Academy of Natural Sciences, the Historical Society of Pennsylvania, the American Association for the Advancement of Science, the American Philosophical Society, and the Pennsylvania Horticultural Society.
