= Monkhead =

Mountain in Alberta, Canada

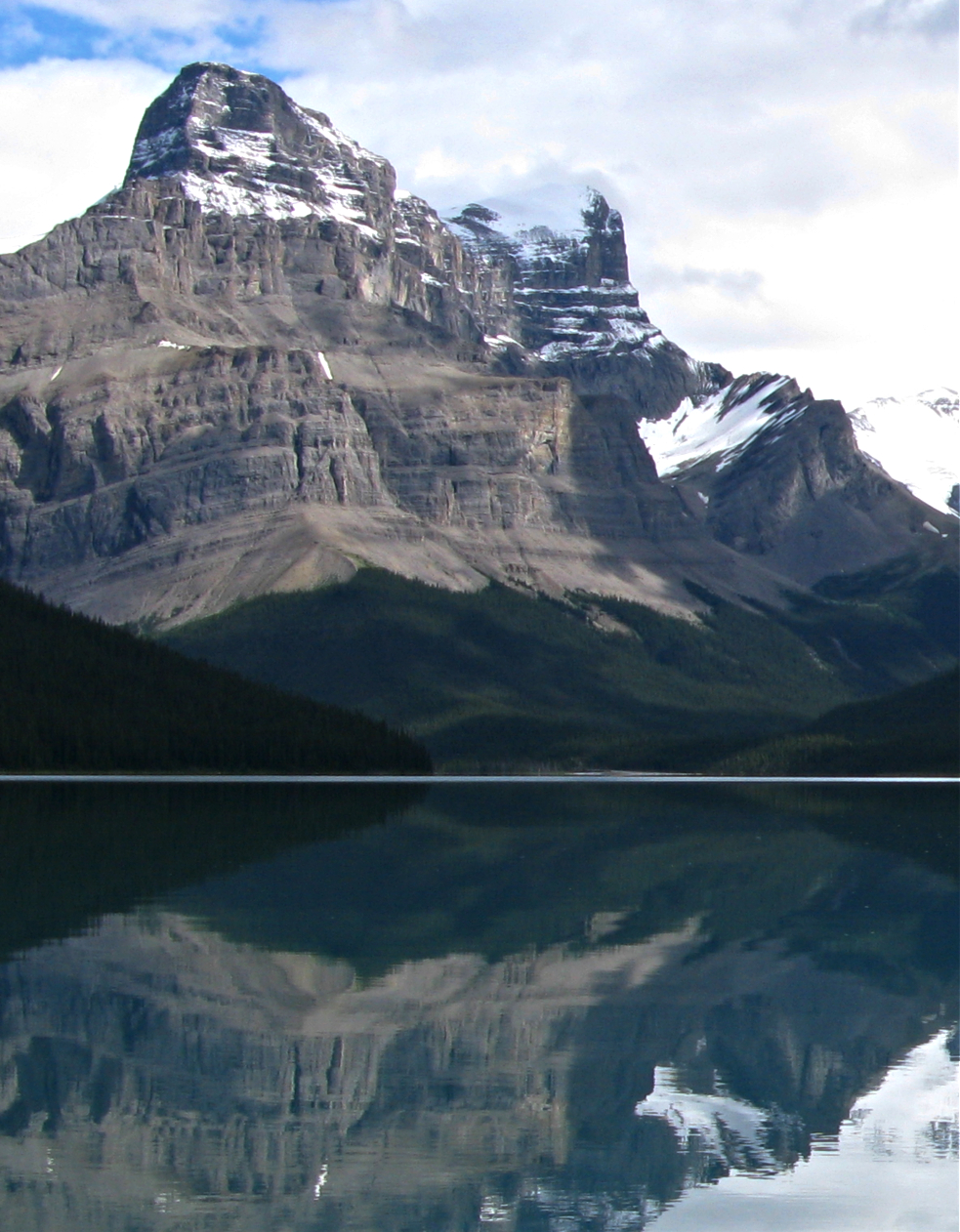
- Monkhead (left) reflected in Maligne Lake

Highest point
- Elevation: 3,250 m (10,660 ft)
- Prominence: 60 m (200 ft)
- Parent peak: Mount Warren (3362 m)
- Listing: Mountains of Alberta
- Coordinates: 52°34′46″N 117°23′21″W

Geography
- Location within Alberta Location within Canada
- Country: Canada
- Province: Alberta
- Protected area: Jasper National Park
- Parent range: Le Grand Brazeau Range; Canadian Rockies
- Topo map: NTS 83C11 Southesk Lake

Geology
- Rock age: Cambrian / Ordovician
- Rock type: Limestone

Climbing
- First ascent: 1950 by Mr. and Mrs. Rex Gibson, D. LaChapelle, E. LaChapelle

Monkhead is a 3,250-metre (10,660-foot) mountain summit located at the south end of Maligne Lake in Jasper National Park, in the Canadian Rockies of Alberta, Canada. Monkhead was named by the Alpine Club of Canada for its hood-like appearance similar to a monk. Its nearest higher peak is Mount Warren, 2.3 kilometres (1.4 miles) to the south-southeast.

Monkhead is situated at the far northwest extreme of the Brazeau Icefield. Monkhead abruptly rises 1,500 metres (4,900 ft) in less than 2 kilometres (1.2 mi) from the lake giving it dramatic local relief. Monkhead is often seen in the background of iconic calendar photos of Spirit Island with Maligne Lake.

== History ==
The mountain's name was officially adopted in 1946 by the Geographical Names Board of Canada. The first ascent of Monkhead was made in 1950 by Mr. and Mrs. Rex Gibson, D. LaChapelle, and E. LaChapelle.

== Climate ==
Based on the Köppen climate classification, Monkhead is located in a subarctic climate with cold, snowy winters, and mild summers. Temperatures can drop below −20 degrees Celsius (−4 degrees Fahrenheit) with wind chill factors below −30 °C (−22 °F). Precipitation runoff from Monkhead drains into the Maligne River, which is a tributary of the Athabasca River.

== Gallery ==
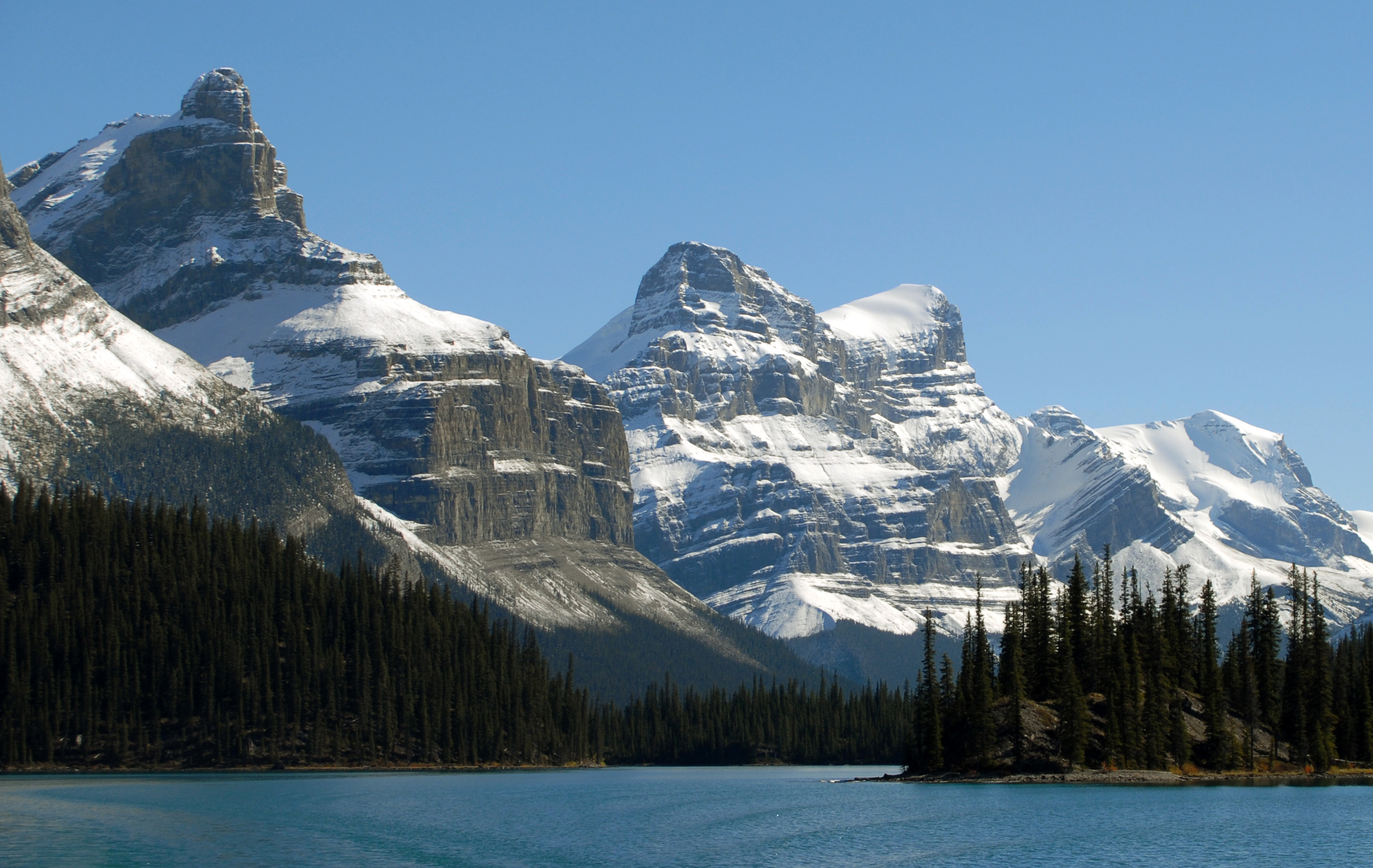
Monkhead centered, Mount Paul in upper left

== See also ==
- List of mountains in the Canadian Rockies
- Geography of the Rocky Mountains
- Geography of Alberta
