= Opal Hills =

Hill group in Alberta, Canada

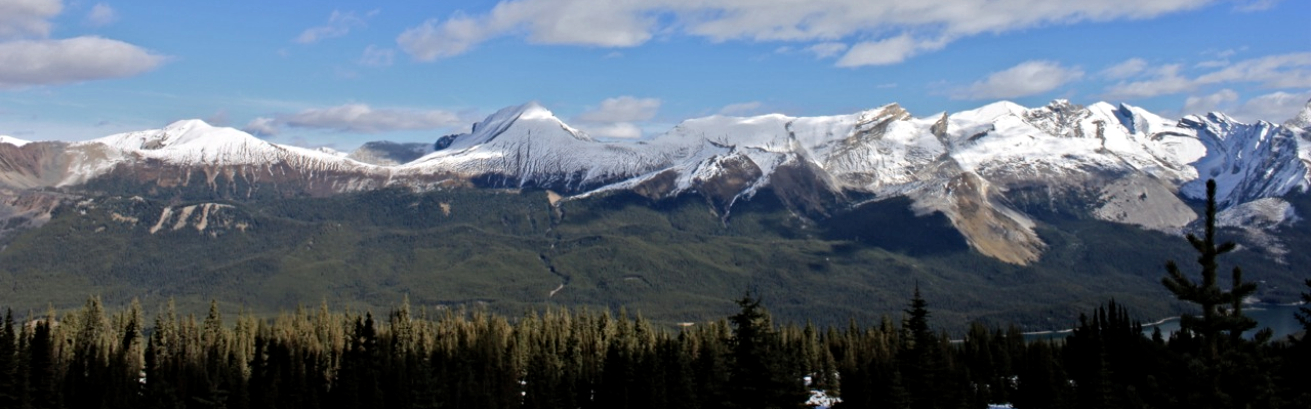
- Opal Hills seen from Bald Hills

Highest point
- Peak: Opal Peak
- Elevation: 2,840 m (9,320 ft)
- Coordinates: 52°45′18″N 117°35′51″W

Geography
- Location within Alberta
- Country: Canada
- Province: Alberta
- Parent range: Queen Elizabeth Ranges; Canadian Rockies

Opal Hills is a sub-range of the Queen Elizabeth Ranges in Jasper National Park, Alberta, Canada. There is an 8.2 km (5.1 mi) hiking trail.

== Climate ==
Based on the Köppen climate classification, the Opal Hills are located in a subarctic climate with cold, snowy winters, and mild summers. Temperatures can drop below -20 °C with wind chill factors below -30 °C.
