= Maligne Canyon =

- Slot canyon
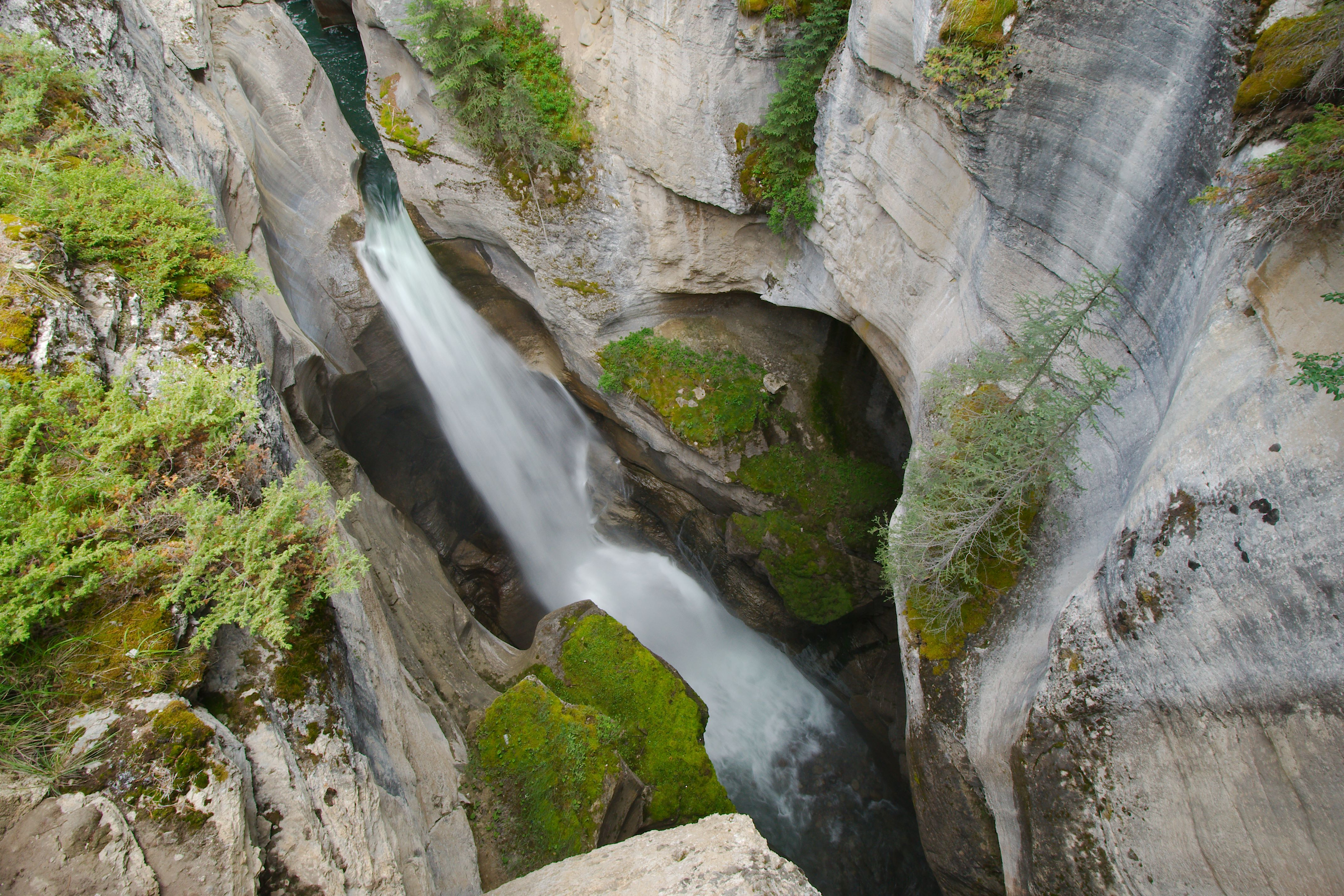
- Looking down into Maligne Canyon

- Location within Alberta
- Coordinates: 52°55′13″N 118°0′39″W
- Location: Jasper National Park, Alberta
- Formed by: Maligne River
- Geology: Palliser Formation

Dimensions
  - Width: 2 metres (6.6 ft)
  - Depth: 50 metres (160 ft)

Maligne Canyon is a slot canyon located in the Jasper National Park near Jasper, Alberta, Canada. Eroded out of the Palliser Formation, the canyon measures over 50 metres (160 ft) deep. Popular for sightseeing and exploration, the area contains waterfalls, underground stream outlets, birds and plant life.

== Geology ==
While visually striking and unusual, slot canyons are a common occurrence within the northern Rocky Mountains. These canyons show the characteristics of karst topography and are common in this region due to the easily soluble nature of the limestone. Flowing out of Medicine Lake, the Maligne River flows about 15 kilometers upstream as a full size river, but as a losing stream, quickly disappears into seeps in the ground and completely vanishes from the surface not far from the lake for most of the year. The smaller streams that feed the valley below that point rebuild the river by the time it reaches the top of the canyon. The river drops down the canyon and intersects the bedrock layers where the underground river flows. Also at this point numerous large underground streams join and greatly amplify the flow. The canyon is constantly being eroded by the churning and swirling of the water. The effect of this has made the width 2 metres (6.6 ft) across at some points and a depth of 50 metres (160 ft). Limestone is one of the most dominant minerals within the canyon. It was deposited in a shallow tropical sea by plankton which secrete limestone.

== See also ==
- List of waterfalls
- List of waterfalls of Canada
