= Mount Charlton (Canada) =

Mountain in Canada

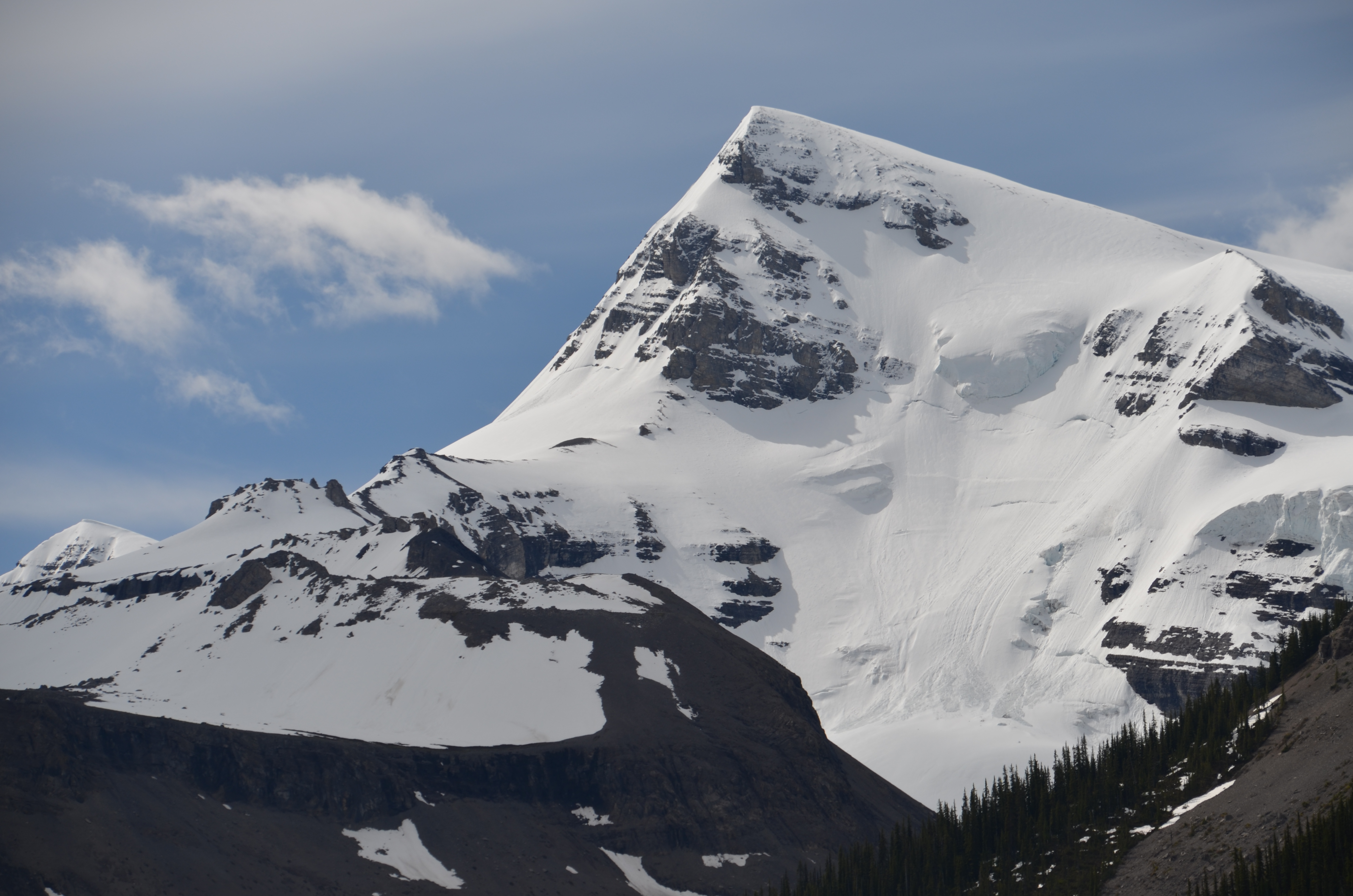

Highest point
- Elevation: 3,217 m (10,554 ft)
- Prominence: 197 m (646 ft)
- Parent peak: Mount Brazeau (3470 m)
- Listing: Mountains of Alberta
- Coordinates: 52°36′41″N 117°30′40″W

Geography
- Location within Alberta Location within Canada
- Country: Canada
- Province: Alberta
- Parent range: Queen Elizabeth Ranges; Canadian Rockies
- Topo map: NTS 83C12 Athabasca Falls

Climbing
- First ascent: 1921 W.R. Hainsworth, M.M. Strumia

Mount Charlton is a 3,217-metre (10,554-foot) mountain summit located on the west side of Maligne Lake in Jasper National Park, in the Canadian Rockies of Alberta, Canada. Its nearest higher peak is Mount Unwin, 1.2 km (0.75 mi) to the west.

== History ==
The peak was named in 1911 by Mary Schäffer for H. R. Charlton, a railroad official who served with the Grand Trunk Pacific Railway as the General Advertising Agent.

The first ascent was made in 1921 by W.R. Hainsworth and M.M. Strumia.

The mountain's name was made official in 1947 by the Geographical Names Board of Canada.

== Climate ==
Based on the Köppen climate classification, Mount Charlton is located in a subarctic climate with cold, snowy winters, and mild summers. Temperatures can drop below −20 degrees Celsius (−4 degrees Fahrenheit) with wind chill factors below −30 °C (−22 °F). Precipitation runoff from Mount Charlton drains into the Maligne River, which is a tributary of the Athabasca River.

== Gallery ==
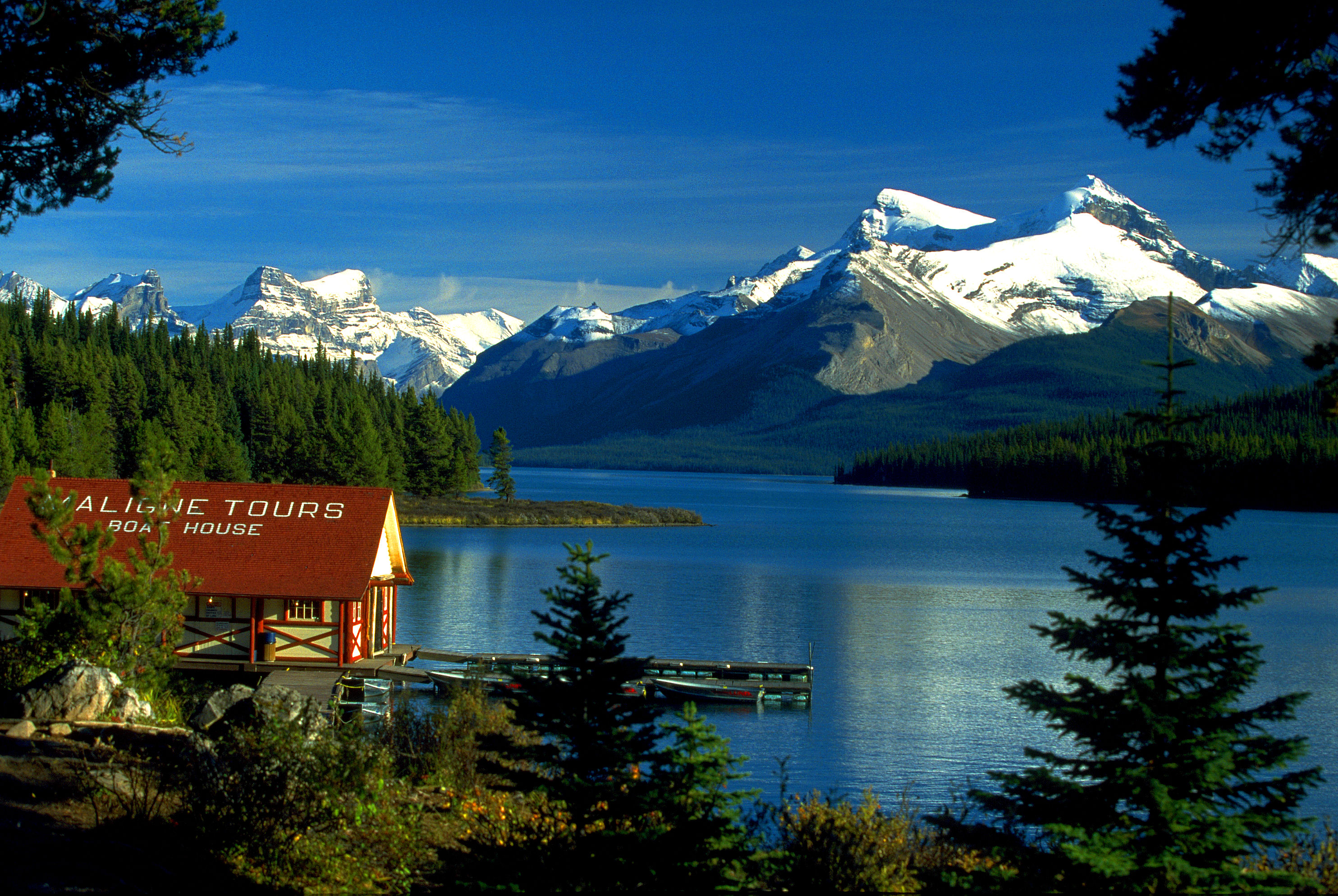
Maligne Lake with Mount Charlton right of center with Mount Unwin

== See also ==
- List of mountains in the Canadian Rockies
- List of mountains of Canada
