= Spirit Island (Alberta) =

Island in Alberta, Canada

Native name: Githni-mi-Makoche
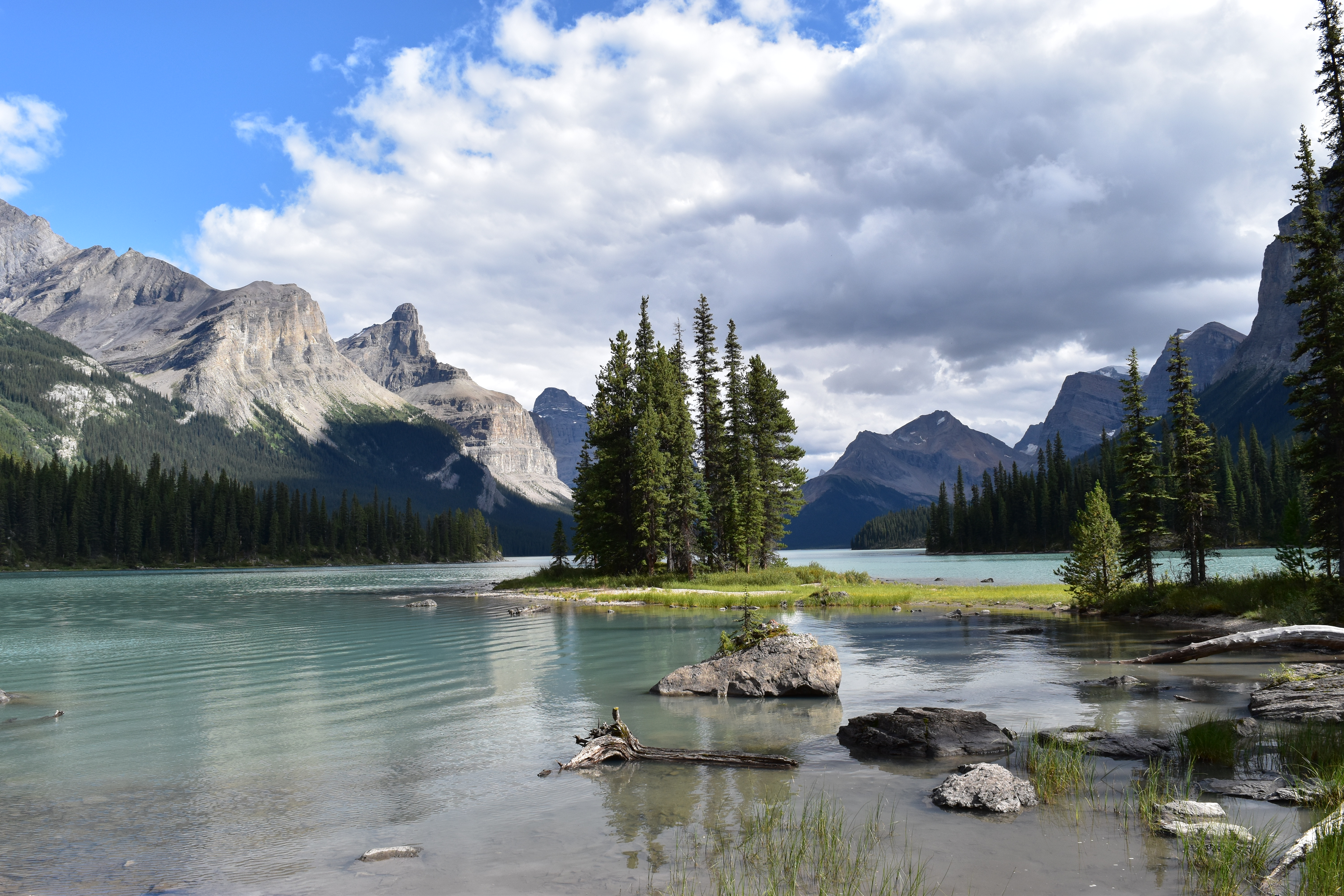

- Location within Alberta

Geography
- Location: Jasper National Park, Canada
- Coordinates: 52°38′35″N 117°29′31″W

Administration
- Canada

Demographics
- Population: 0

Spirit Island (Stoney: Githni-mi-Makoche 'Healing Island') is a tiny tied island in Maligne Lake in Jasper National Park. This landmark is the destination of boat trips across Maligne Lake, a view many people associate with the Canadian Rockies. Spirit Island enjoys worldwide reputation, and is one of the most photographed views of the Canadian Rockies. Maligne Lake boat cruises offer close views of the island.

The island is 1.2 hectares (3 acres) large and is 14 kilometres (8.7 miles) up lake. It is a famous destination for tourists, and is a centerpiece of Maligne Lake.

Spirit Island is not always a true island, as during most of the year, it is connected to the mainland by a very narrow grassy isthmus, making it a tied island.

To protect the island's natural beauty and cultural significance, tourists are not allowed on the island, and the only people allowed to step foot on it are members of the Stoney First Nation, who consider it sacred. Instead, a viewing area on the mainland allows for panoramic vistas.
