= Queen Elizabeth Ranges =

Mountain range in Alberta, Canada

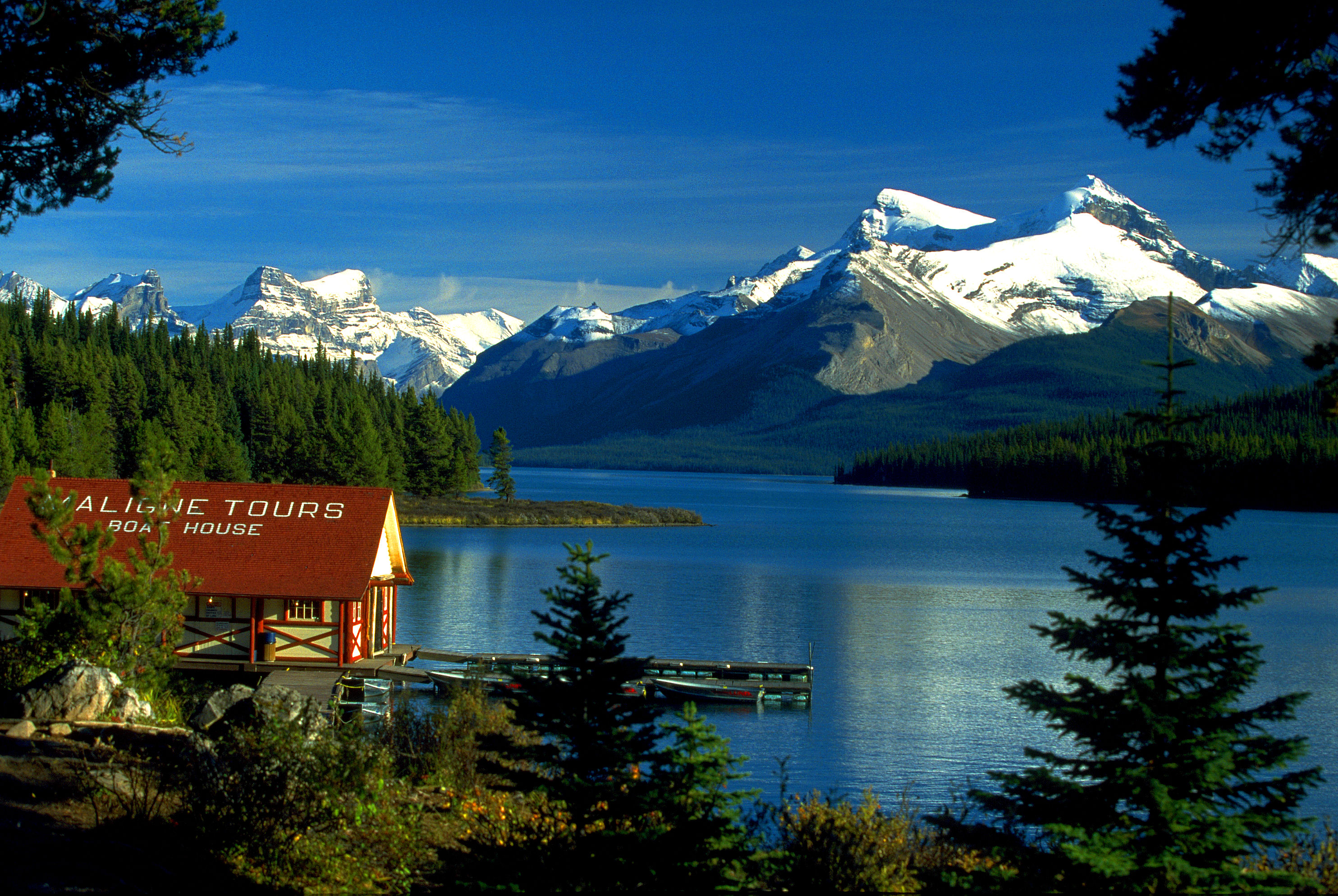
- Seen from Maligne Lake

Highest point
- Peak: Mount Unwin
- Elevation: 3,268 m (10,722 ft)
- Coordinates: 52°36′39″N 117°31′42″W

Geography
- Location within Alberta
- Country: Canada
- Province: Alberta
- Protected area: Jasper National Park
- Range coordinates: 52°45′N 117°37′W
- Parent range: Canadian Rockies
- Topo map: NTS 83C12 Athabasca Falls

The Queen Elizabeth Ranges is a group of mountain ranges in the Canadian Rockies on the southeastern side of Jasper National Park, Canada. The northern end of the ranges begins east of Medicine Lake and extends in a southeasterly direction past the southern shore of Maligne Lake. The group was named in 1953 to celebrate the coronation of Elizabeth II as Canada's sovereign.

These ranges include the following mountains and peaks:

Mountain/Peak	Elevation		Coordinates
Mountain/Peak	m	ft	Coordinates
Mount Unwin	3,268	10,722	52°36'39"N, 117°31'42"W
Mount Charlton	3,217	10,554	52°36'41"N, 117°30'40"W
Mount Mary Vaux	3,201	10,502	
Maligne Mountain	3,200	10,500	52°39'6"N, 117°23'59"W
Coronet Mountain	3,152	10,341	
Llysfran Peak	3,141	10,305	
Mount Moffat	3,090	10,140	
Samson Peak	3,081	10,108	52°40'49"N, 117°30'38"W
Mount Paul	2,805	9,203	52°36'55"N, 117°25'40"W
Leah Peak	2,801	9,190	52°42'44"N, 117°33'14"W
Opal Peak	2,800	9,200	52°45'10"N, 117°35'40"W
Mount Julian	2,760	9,060	52°34'20"N, 117°26'30"W
Helmet Mountain	2,612	8,570	

== See also ==
- Ranges of the Canadian Rockies
- Royal eponyms in Canada
