= Mount Brazeau =

Mountain in Alberta, Canada

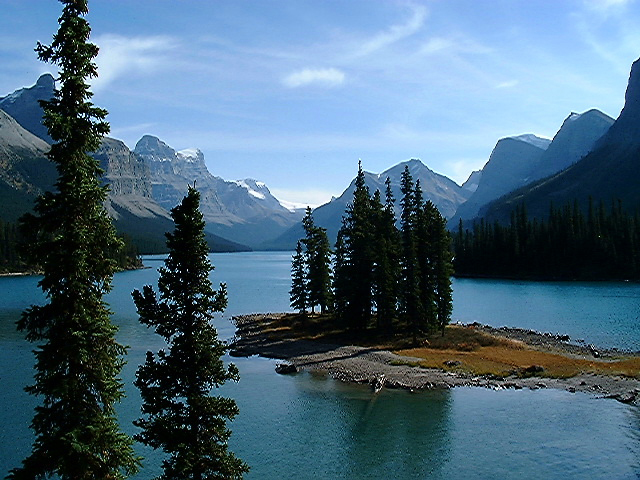
- One of the most famous views in Canada. Spirit Island, Maligne Lake

Highest point
- Elevation: 3,470 m (11,380 ft)
- Prominence: 1,443 m (4,734 ft)
- Parent peak: Mount Athabasca
- Listing: Mountains of Alberta; Canada highest major peaks 38th
- Coordinates: 52°33′04″N 117°21′17″W

Geography
- Location within Alberta
- Country: Canada
- Province: Alberta
- Protected area: Jasper National Park
- Parent range: Brazeau Range
- Topo map: NTS 83C11 Southesk Lake

Climbing
- First ascent: 1923 by A. Carpe, W.D. Harris, Howard Palmer
- Easiest route: rock/snow climb

Mount Brazeau is a mountain in Alberta, Canada.

The mountain is located in the upper Coronet Creek Valley of Jasper National Park, and stands west of the Coronet Glacier and south of Maligne Lake. The mountain was named in 1902 by Arthur P. Coleman after Joseph Edward Brazeau, who had provided his translation skills to the Palliser expedition.

== See also ==
- Mountain peaks of Canada
- List of mountain peaks of North America
- List of mountain peaks of the Rocky Mountains
- Rocky Mountains
