= Maligne Lake =

Lake in Alberta, Canada

- Chaba Imne (Stoney)
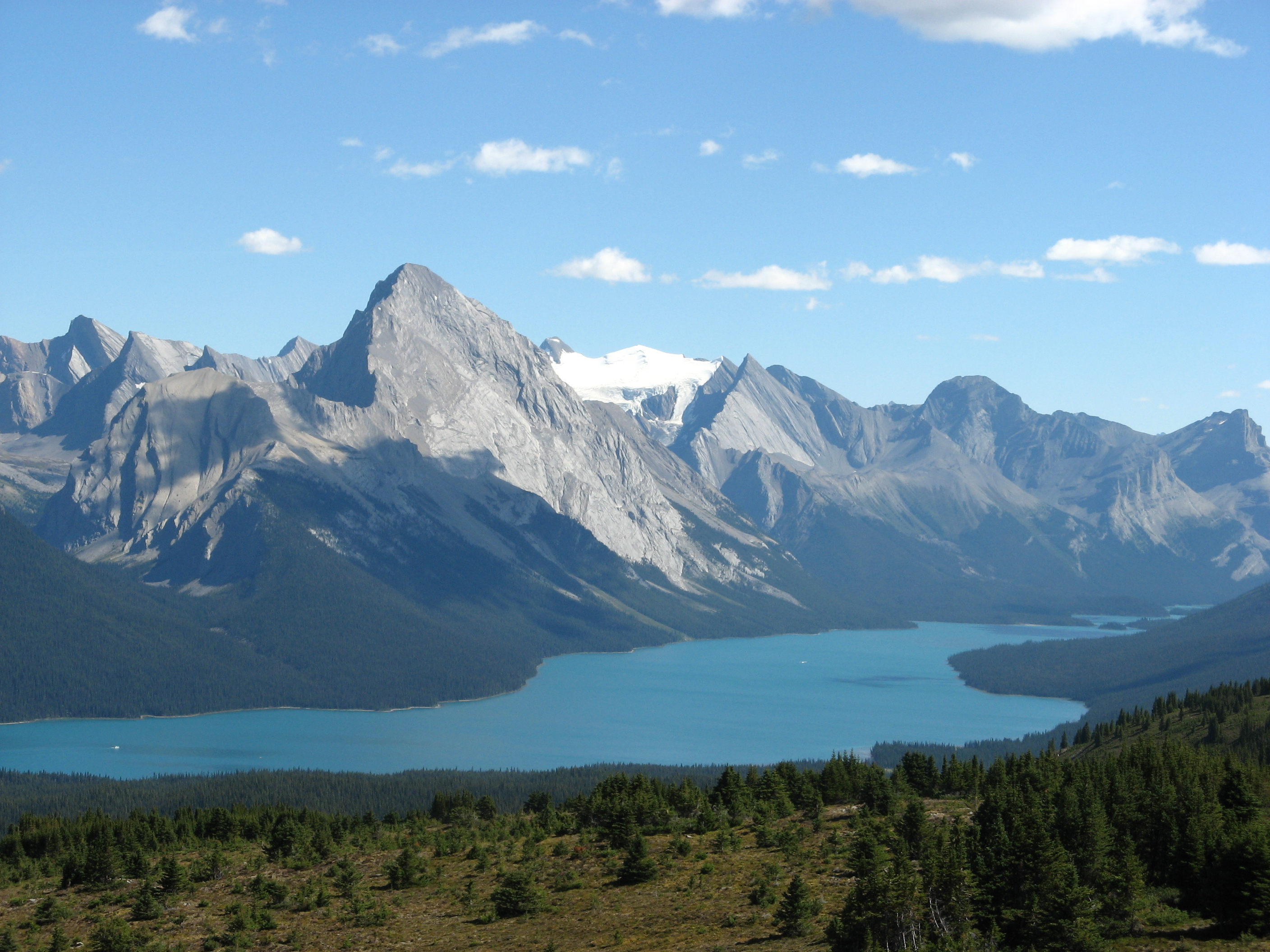
- Maligne Lake and Samson Peak

- Location within Alberta
- Location: Jasper National Park, Alberta
- Coordinates: 52°39′52″N 117°32′01″W
- Lake type: oligotrophic
- Basin countries: Canada
- Max. length: 22.5 km (14.0 mi)
- Max. width: 1.5 km (0.93 mi)
- Surface area: 19.71 km^{2} (7.61 sq mi)
- Average depth: 35 m (115 ft)
- Max. depth: 97 m (318 ft)
- Shore length^{1}: 45 km (28 mi)
- Surface elevation: 1,670 m (5,480 ft)
- Settlements: Jasper
- ^{1} Shore length is not a well-defined measure.

Maligne Lake (/məˈliːn/ mə-LEEN) is a lake in Jasper National Park, Alberta, Canada. The lake is famed for the colour of its azure water, the surrounding peaks, the three glaciers visible from the lake, and Spirit Island, a frequently and very famously photographed islet. The lake is located 44 km (27 mi) south of Jasper town, and is accessible by motor vehicle, including shuttle buses from Jasper. Boat tours run to Spirit Island in the spring to autumn season. The 44 km Skyline Trail, Jasper's most popular, highest and above treeline, multi-day hike, begins at Maligne Lake and finishes near the town of Jasper. Other popular day hikes include the Opal Hills and Bald Hills loops. Winter activities include cross-country skiing and snowboarding.

Maligne Lake is approximately 22.5 km (14.0 mi) long and is 97 m (318 ft) at its deepest point, in the south end of the lake. It averages 35 m (115 ft) in depth. It sits at approximately 1,670 m (5,480 ft) asl. Easily visible from the Maligne Lake Day Lodge are Leah and Samson Peaks and Mount Paul to the east, and Mounts Charlton, Unwin, Mary Vaux and Llysfran Peak to the south and west. The Charlton-Unwin, Maligne, and Coronet glaciers are visible from the lake, which boasts a self-sustaining population of introduced rainbow trout and brook trout. It is a popular spot for sport fishing, kayaking and canoeing. Parks Canada maintains three camping sites, accessible only by canoe, at Hidden Cove, Fisherman's Bay and Coronet Creek.

Maligne Lake is fed and drained by the Maligne River, which enters the lake on its south side, near Mount Unwin and drains the lake to the north. Maligne Lake, as well as Maligne River, Maligne Mountain, and Maligne Pass, takes its name from the French word for malignant or wicked. The name was used by Father Pierre-Jean De Smet (1801–1873) to describe the turbulent river that flows from the lake (in the spring), and soon spread to the lake, canyon, pass, mountain and range. It is also possible that early French traders applied the name to the river for its treacherous confluence with the Athabasca River.

== History ==
The lake was well known to First Nations of the area, including Samson Beaver, who knew it as Chaba Imne ("Beaver Lake"). He drew the first map of the lake and the route to it for Mary Schäffer in 1907. Schäffer was an explorer and artist of the Rocky Mountains area who, being the first non-native to visit Chabna Imne, was credited with the discovery; she attached the name Maligne Lake. The first European to actually see the lake was Henry McLeod, scouting routes for the CPR in 1875. When he sighted it, he was high in the mountain range and did not actually go into the lake area or identify the route to the lake. June 8, 1908, with the help of Samson Beaver's map, Schäffer, her travelling companion Mary (Mollie) Adams and the guides Billy Warren and Sid Unwin, set out from Lake Louise to reach the lake. When they arrived at the lake, they explored it with the means of a raft, nicknamed HMS Chaba. At the request of the Canadian government, Schäffer returned in 1911 to survey the lake in more detail. She also named several of the mountains and peaks. Mary Schäffer's books of the area attracted tourists from all over the United States.

Maligne Lake is the location of two Alberta registered historic buildings, the Maligne Lake Chalet and accompanying guest house, washhouse, and cache, all built in 1927 by Colonel Fred Brewster as a part of his "Rocky Mountain Camps". For a time, the Maligne Lake Chalet was the largest, most luxurious accommodation in Jasper National Park. The other historic building is the boathouse, built by Donald "Curly" Phillips in 1928 to accommodate his wilderness guiding and fishing business. In the same year, he finished construction of the first Maligne Lake tour boat, Leah (named for Leah Samson, wife of Samson Beaver). Philips resided in his boathouse until his death in an avalanche (1936, aged 52). The historic buildings are maintained by Maligne Lake Tours, a company that dates back to Brewster's and Philips' early entrepreneurial endeavours.

Curly Philips is credited with stocking Maligne Lake with brook trout, packed overland in barrels. Then in the 1970 Parks Canada decided to introduce rainbow trout to make sport fishing in the lake more difficult. The largest rainbow trout in Alberta was subsequently caught in this lake (20 pounds 4 ounces or 9.2 kilograms) by the means of sport fishing. The record fish was mounted and is currently owned by Currie's Guiding and Tackle, Jasper. Jasper National Park staff later introduced brook trout. The third largest brook trout in the world was also sport fished from this lake and is owned by David Robson of Hinton, Alberta.

== Ecology ==
Wildlife is surprisingly abundant along this high altitude oligotrophic lake. Grizzly bear, black bear, mule deer, caribou, wolves, moose, and mountain sheep are some of the larger mammals that frequent the lake area during the summer season. Bald eagles, golden eagles and osprey also frequent the area and live off the fish populations.

== In popular culture ==
Maligne Lake is the subject of a major painting by Group of Seven artist Lawren Harris. Harris and fellow Group of Seven painter A. Y. Jackson spent August and early September 1924 sketching in Jasper National Park, camping at the south end of the lake. Harris completed the painting "Maligne Lake, Jasper Park" later that year, a turning point in his career as the first of many paintings inspired by his expeditions to the Rocky Mountains. The painting was purchased by the National Gallery of Canada in 1928, where it is on display as part of the gallery's permanent collection.

== Gallery ==
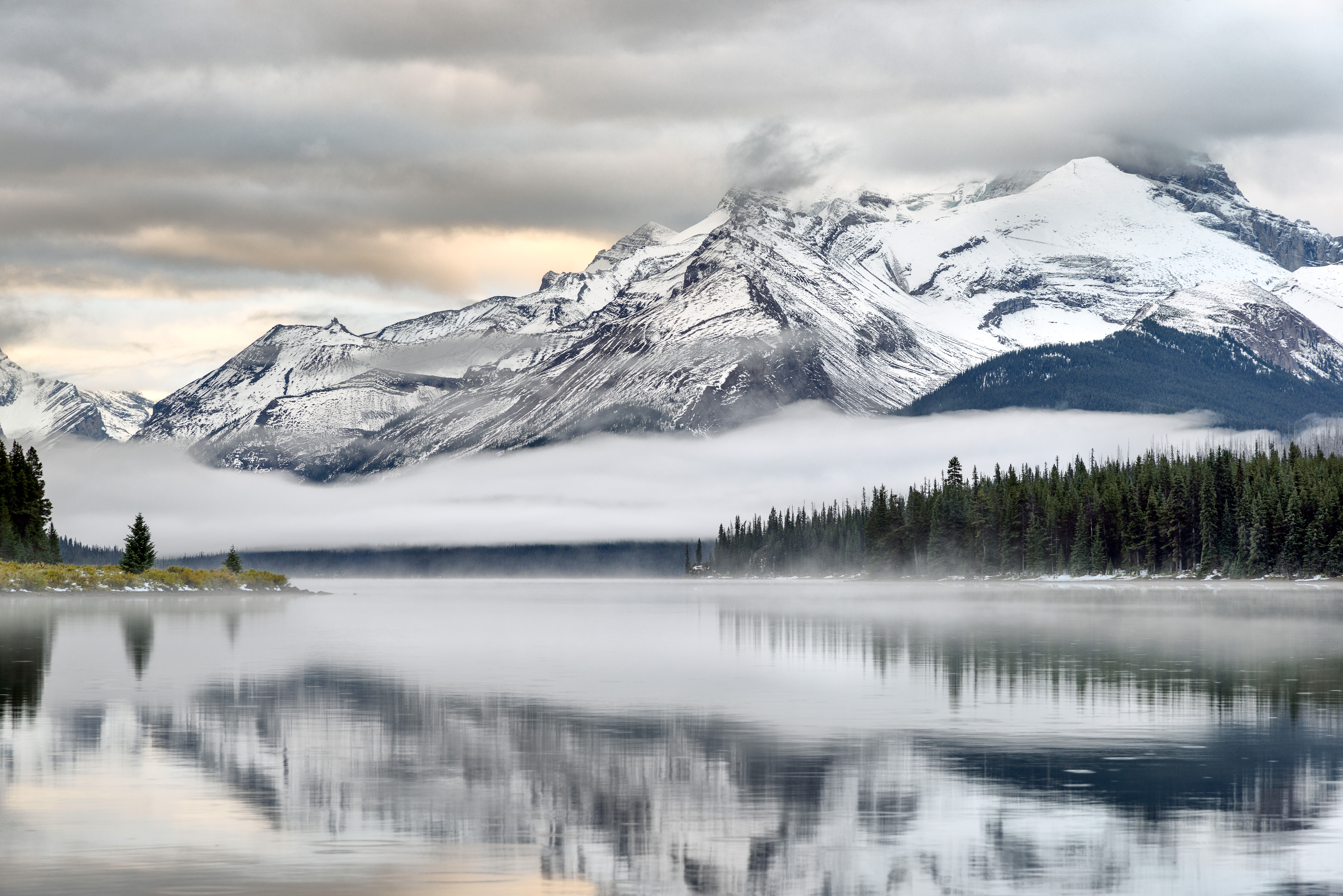
Sunrise in winter at the lake

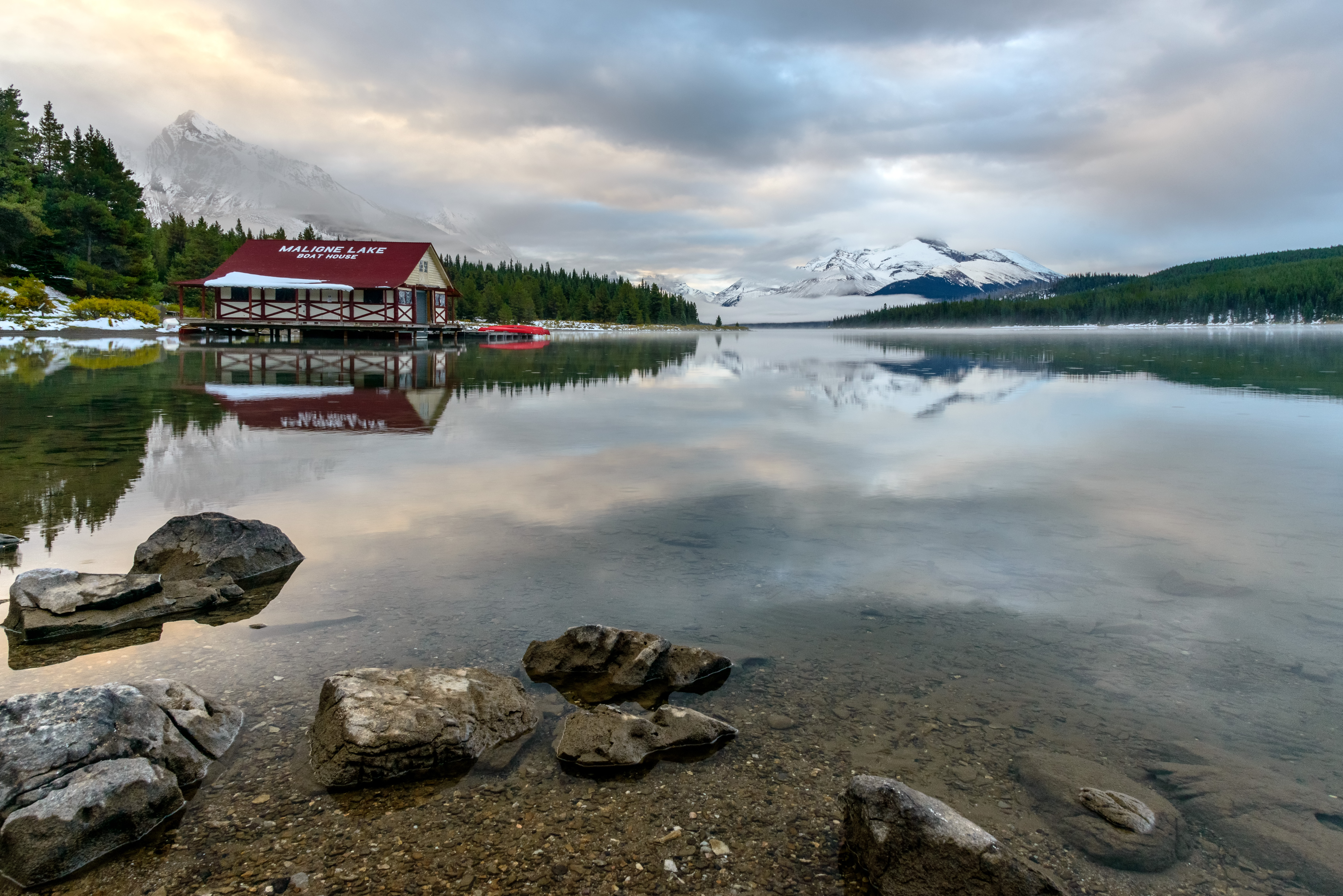
Lake panorama and boathouse

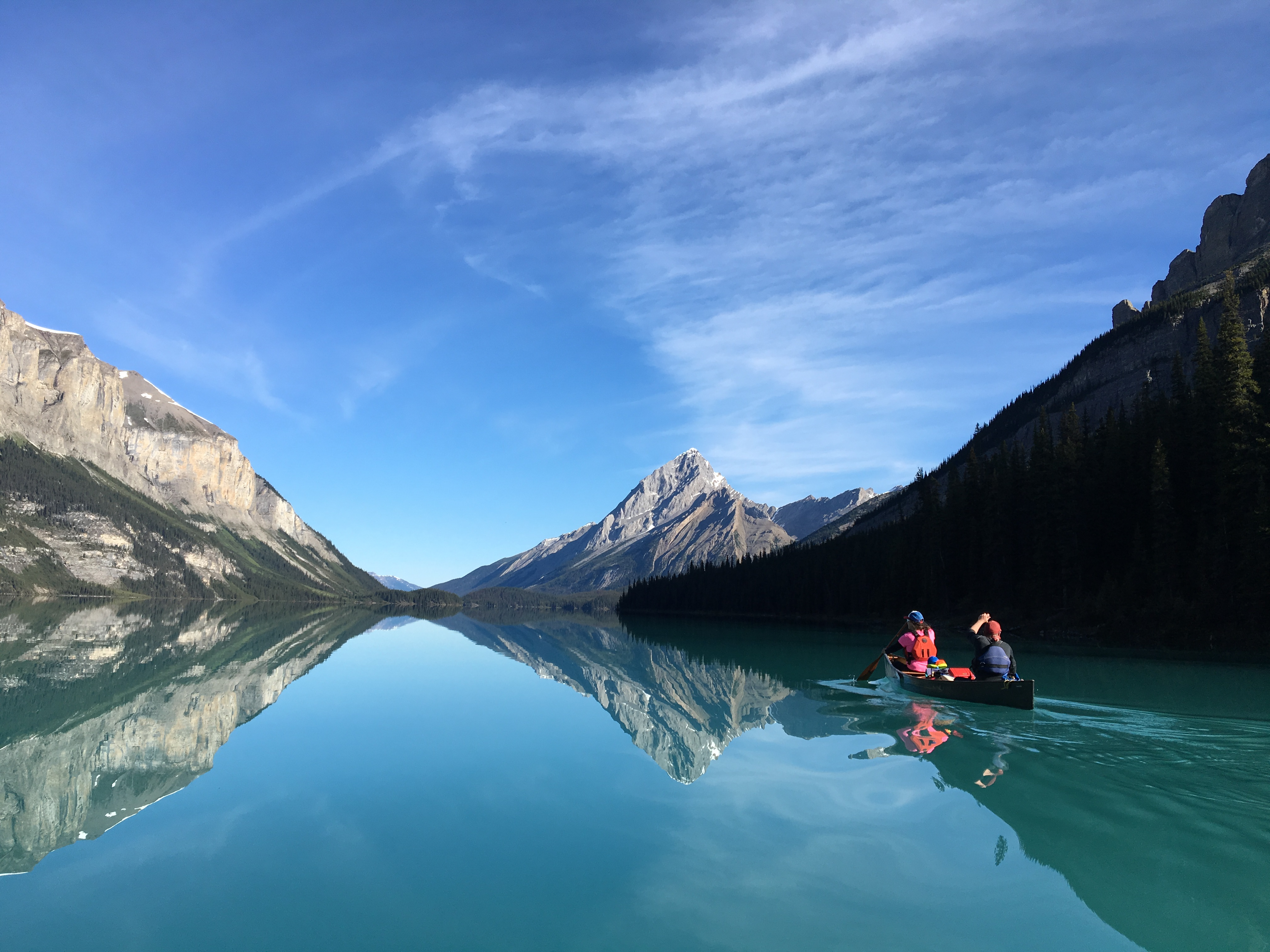
Backcountry canoe trip on the lake

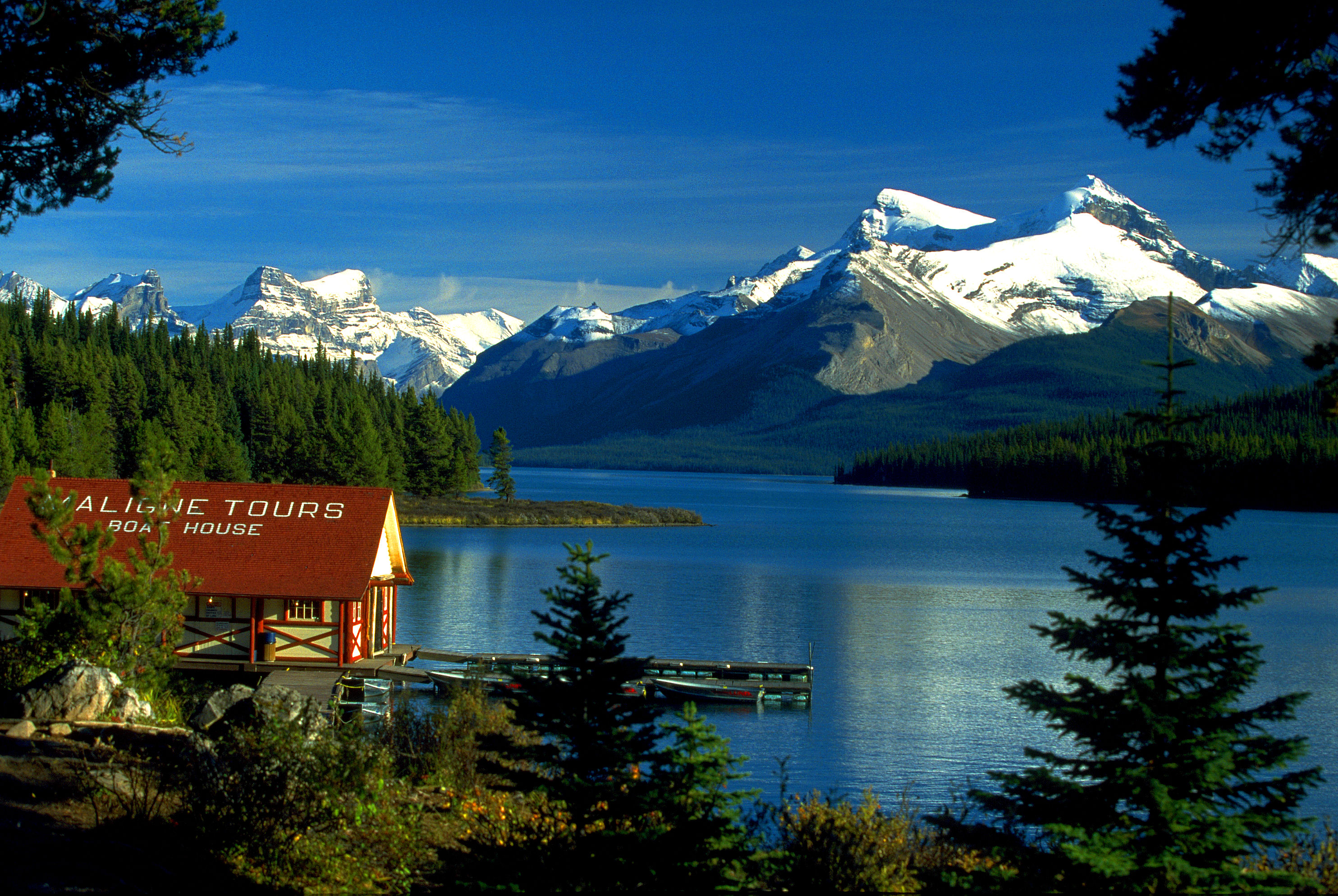
Lake and boathouse

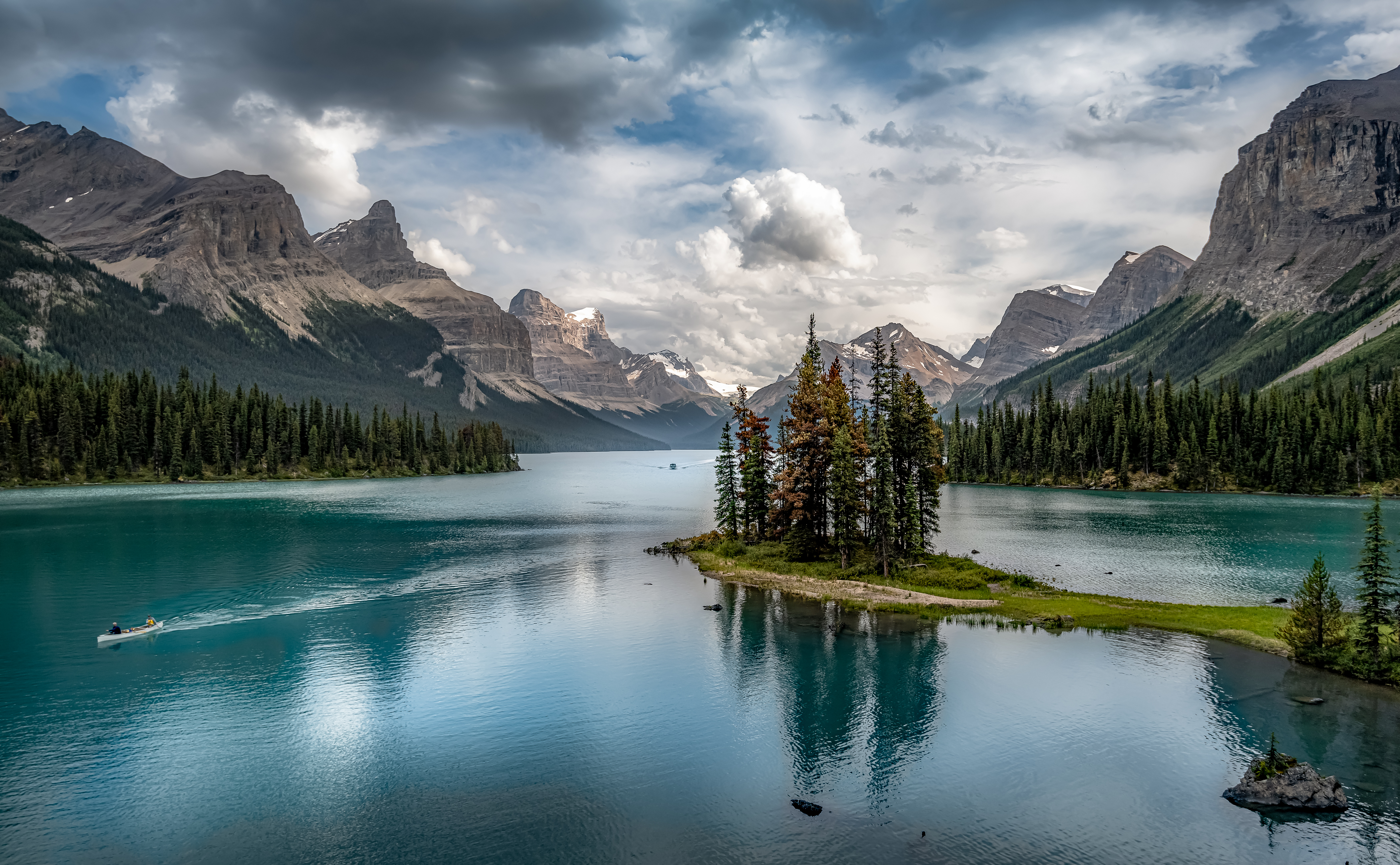
Spirit Island
