= Maligne River =

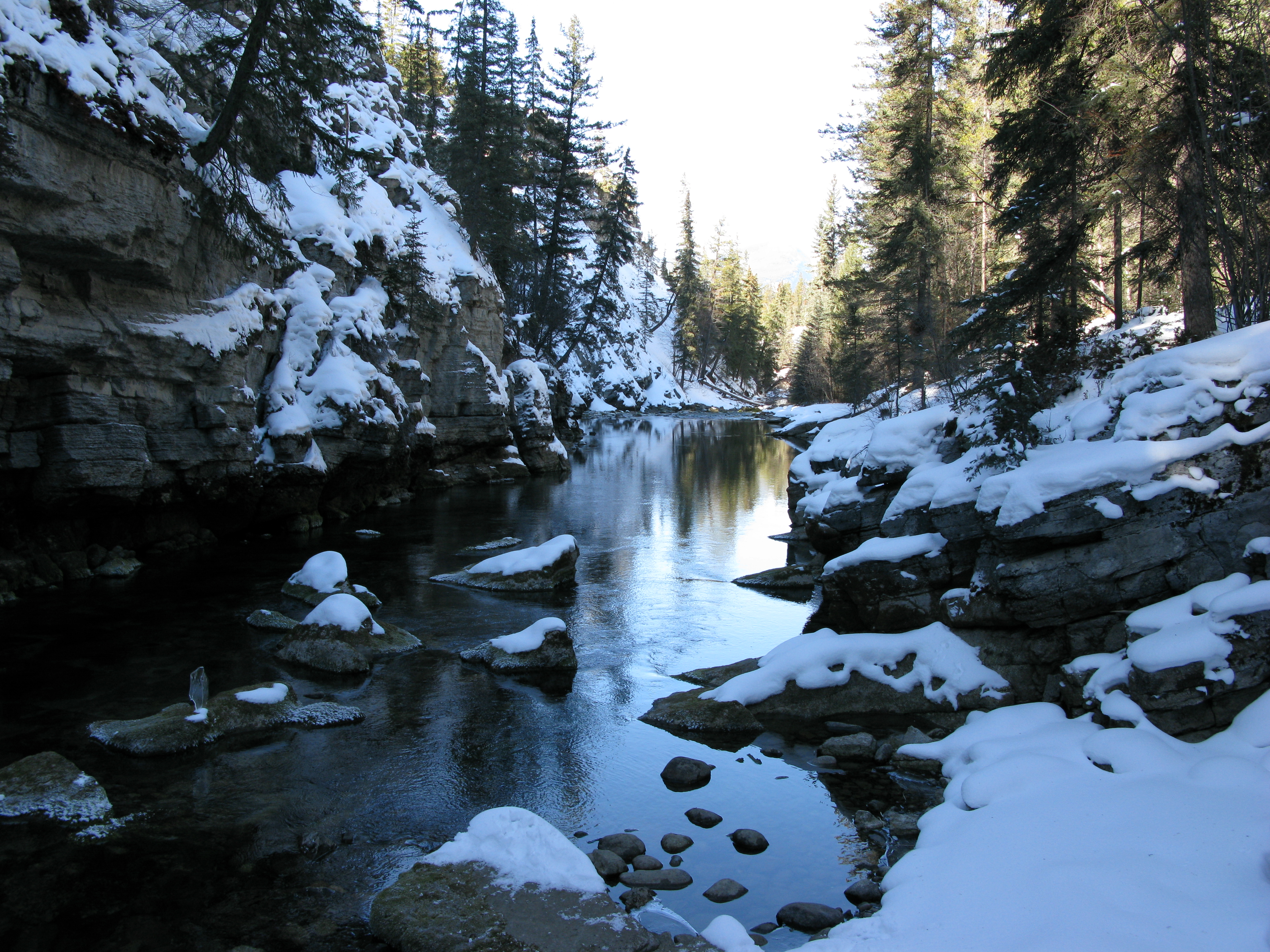
- The Maligne River River north of Maligne Lake

Location
- Country: Canada
- Province: Alberta

Physical characteristics
- Source
  - location: Replica Peak
  - coordinates: 52°32′01″N 117°28′30″W
  - elevation: 2,048 m (6,719 ft)
- Mouth
  - location: Athabasca River
  - coordinates: 52°56′02″N 118°01′59″W
  - elevation: 1,019 m (3,343 ft)

The Maligne River (/məˈliːn/ mə-LEEN) is a medium-sized river in the Canadian Rockies. It runs through parts of Jasper National Park in Alberta, Canada. The Maligne is a major tributary of the Athabasca River.

== Etymology ==
The river takes its name from the French maligne, meaning "malignant" or "wicked". Pierre-Jean De Smet created this name in reference to the current of the river near its confluence with the Athabasca River.

== Geography ==
The Maligne River begins south of Maligne Lake. Forming from the meltwater of Replica Peak, the river heads north, passing under Mount Mary Vaux, Lysfran Peak, Mount Unwin, and Mount Charleton before emptying into Maligne Lake. The Maligne River drains the north end of Maligne Lake and heads northwest to Medicine Lake. It then flows west, entering the Athabasca River. Below Maligne Lake, it is a losing stream; its flow mostly disappears underground at Medicine Lake, only to reappear downstream in Maligne Canyon.

== Gallery ==
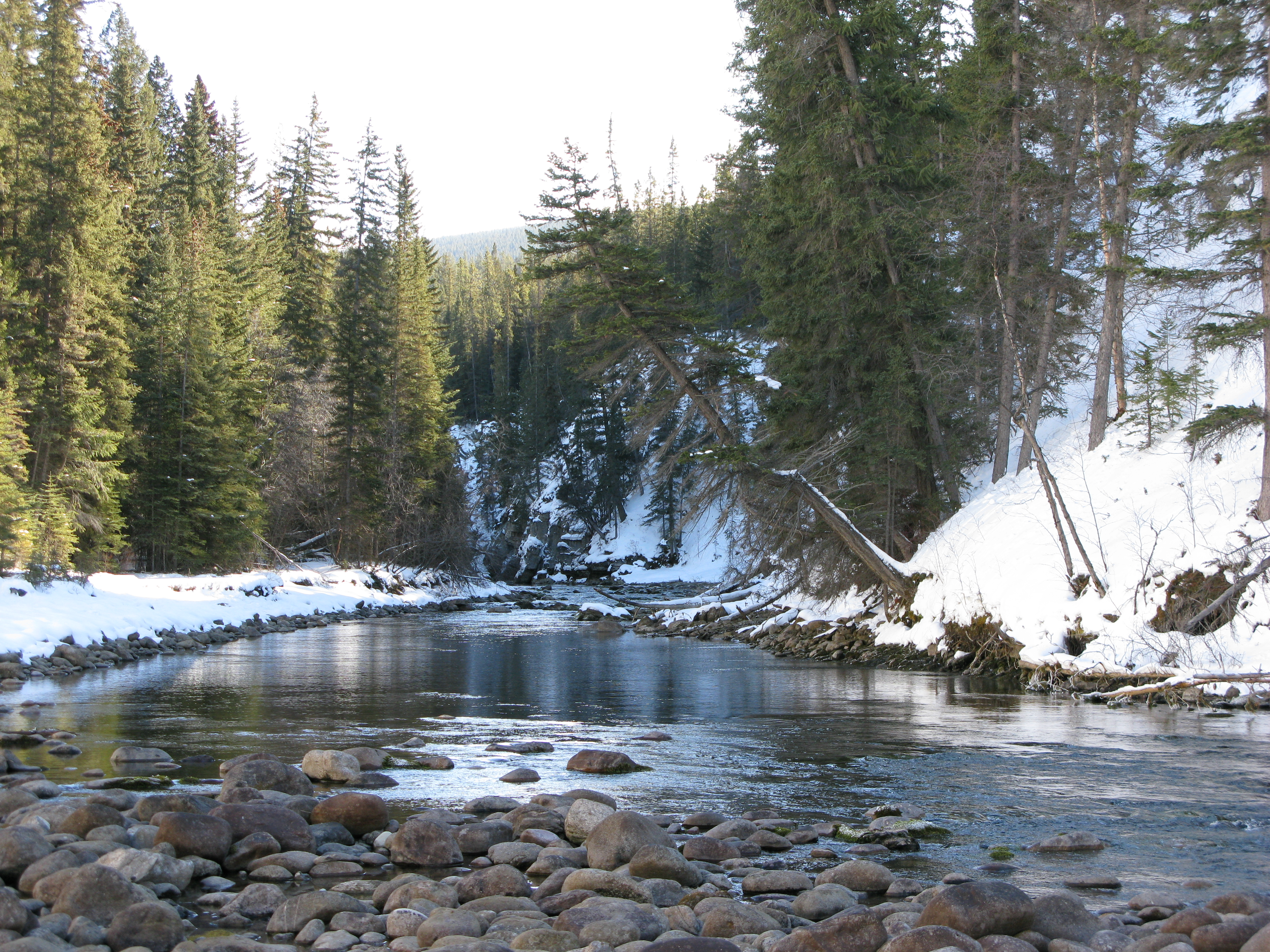
The Maligne River downstream of Maligne Lake

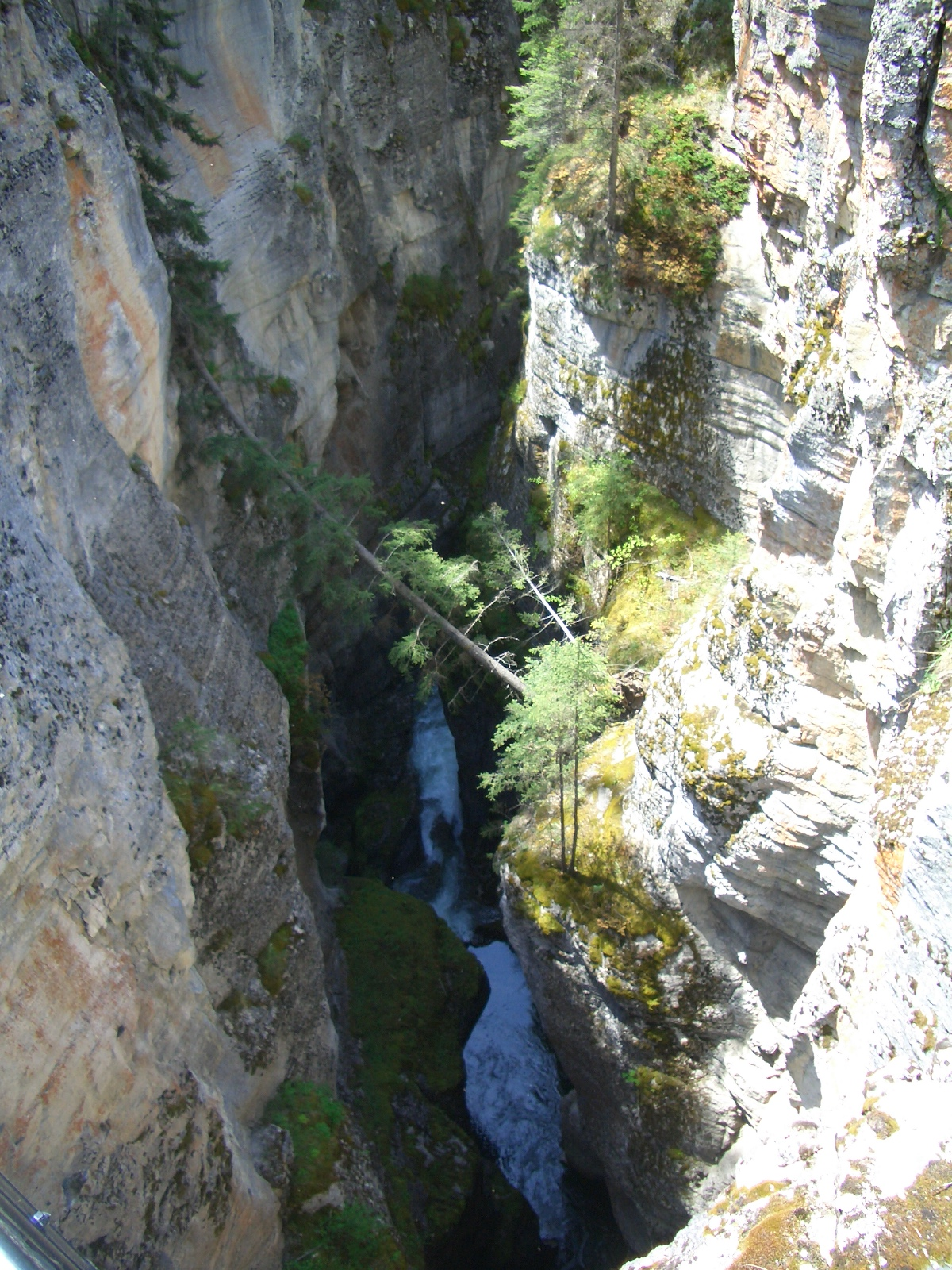
Maligne Canyon

== See also ==
- List of Alberta rivers
- Maligne Range
