= Mary Schäffer Warren =

American-Canadian naturalist (1861–1939)

Mary T. S. Schäffer Warren
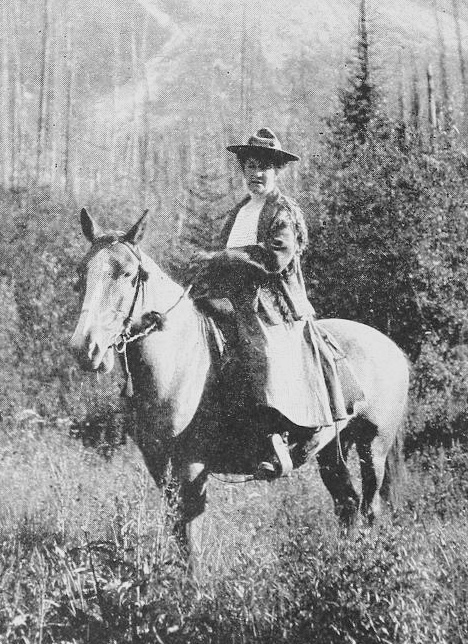
- Warren in 1911
- Born: Mary Townsend Sharples; 1861; West Chester, Pennsylvania
- Died: 1939 (aged 77–78); Banff, Alberta
- Known for: Painter, photographer, writer
- Spouses: Charles Schäffer (m. 1890–1903) Billy Warren (m. 1915)

Mary Schäffer Warren (1861–1939) was an American-Canadian naturalist, illustrator, photographer, and writer. She was known for her experiences in the Canadian Rockies in the early 20th century.

== Biography ==
Warren was born Mary Townsend Sharples in 1861 in West Chester, Pennsylvania. She studied flower painting with George Cochran Lambdin.

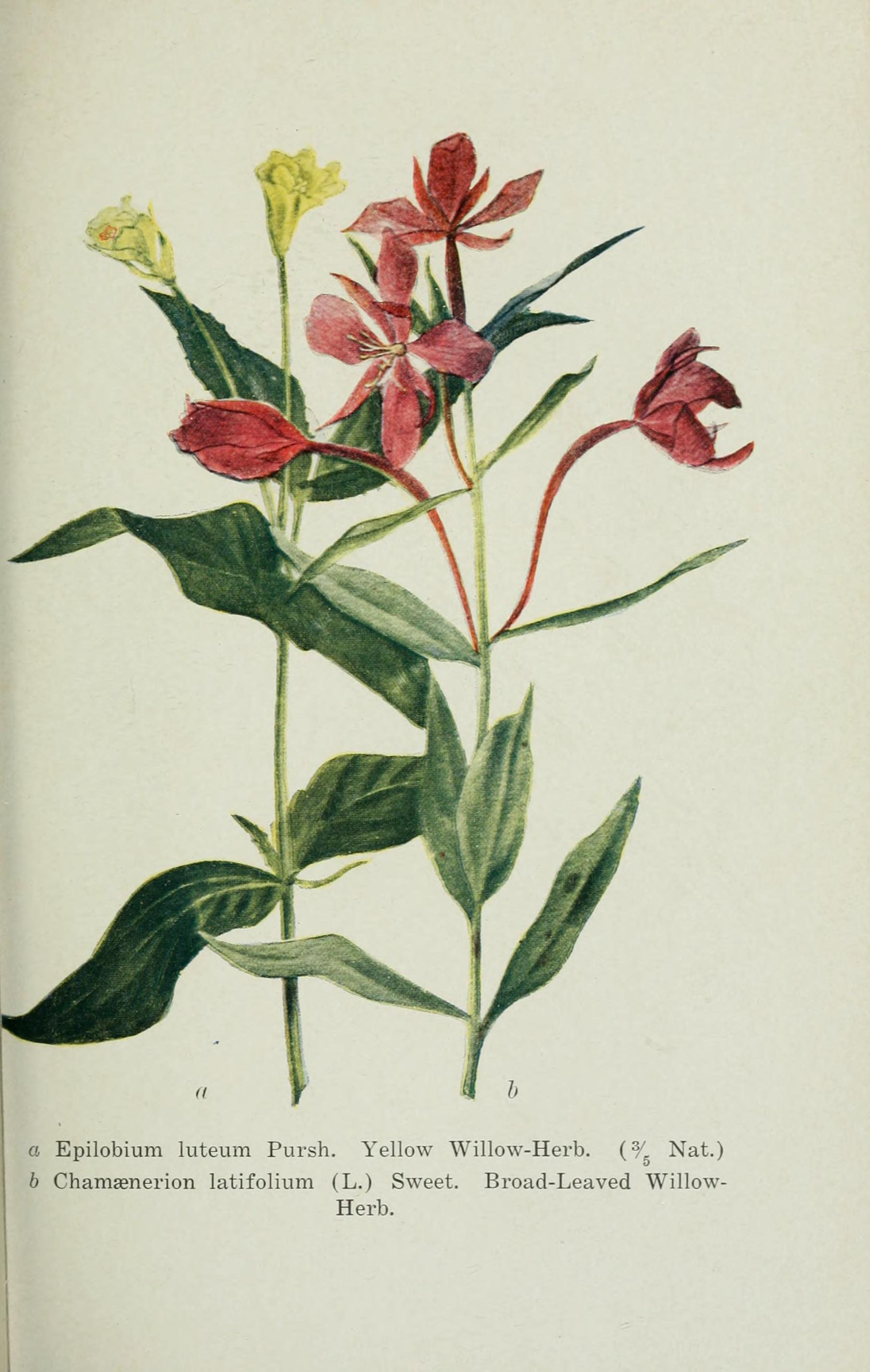
Illustration from "Alpine flora of the Canadian Rocky Mountains"

In 1889 Sharples embarked on her first visit to the Canadian Rockies, accompanied by her fellow art student, Mary Vaux. In 1890 she married Dr. Charles Schäffer, an amateur botanist, whom she had met the previous year at Glacier House, the Canadian Pacific Railway's hotel in the Selkirk Mountains. The couple would spend summers and autumns traveling in the Canadian Rockies. Their winters were spent in Philadelphia. Charles Schäffer died in 1903, as did Mary's father and mother.

Schäffer exhibited her photographs independently at the 1900 Paris Exposition. In 1904, Schäffer returned to the Canadian Rockies with her friend Mary "Mollie" Adams determined to complete a botanical guide that her husband had started. To complete this project Schäffer collected botanical specimens and learned photography. That year, she collected specimens for the University of Pennsylvania. In 1907 Alpine Flora of the Canadian Rocky Mountains was published, with text by Stewardson Brown and drawings and photographs by Schäffer. 1907 also saw Schäffer transition from using a folding camera and glass plate negatives for her work to using celluloid film.

Upon completion of her botanical work, Schäffer and Adams decided that they wanted to explore further into the mountains. They convinced, a mountain guide named William "Billy" Warren and fellow guide Sidney Unwin to provide the outfit and knowledge necessary to try finding "Chaba Imne," a lake in an unexplored mountain valley that they had heard of from the Stoney First Nations people. As recorded in Mary's book, Old Indian Trails of the Canadian Rockies, a map drawn by Samson Beaver led to the first recorded visit to Jasper's Maligne Lake in 1908, which Mary describes as “an entire string of pearls.” Throughout her travels she continued to take photographs that she would hand-colour upon her return home and use to encourage others to travel in the Canadian Rockies.

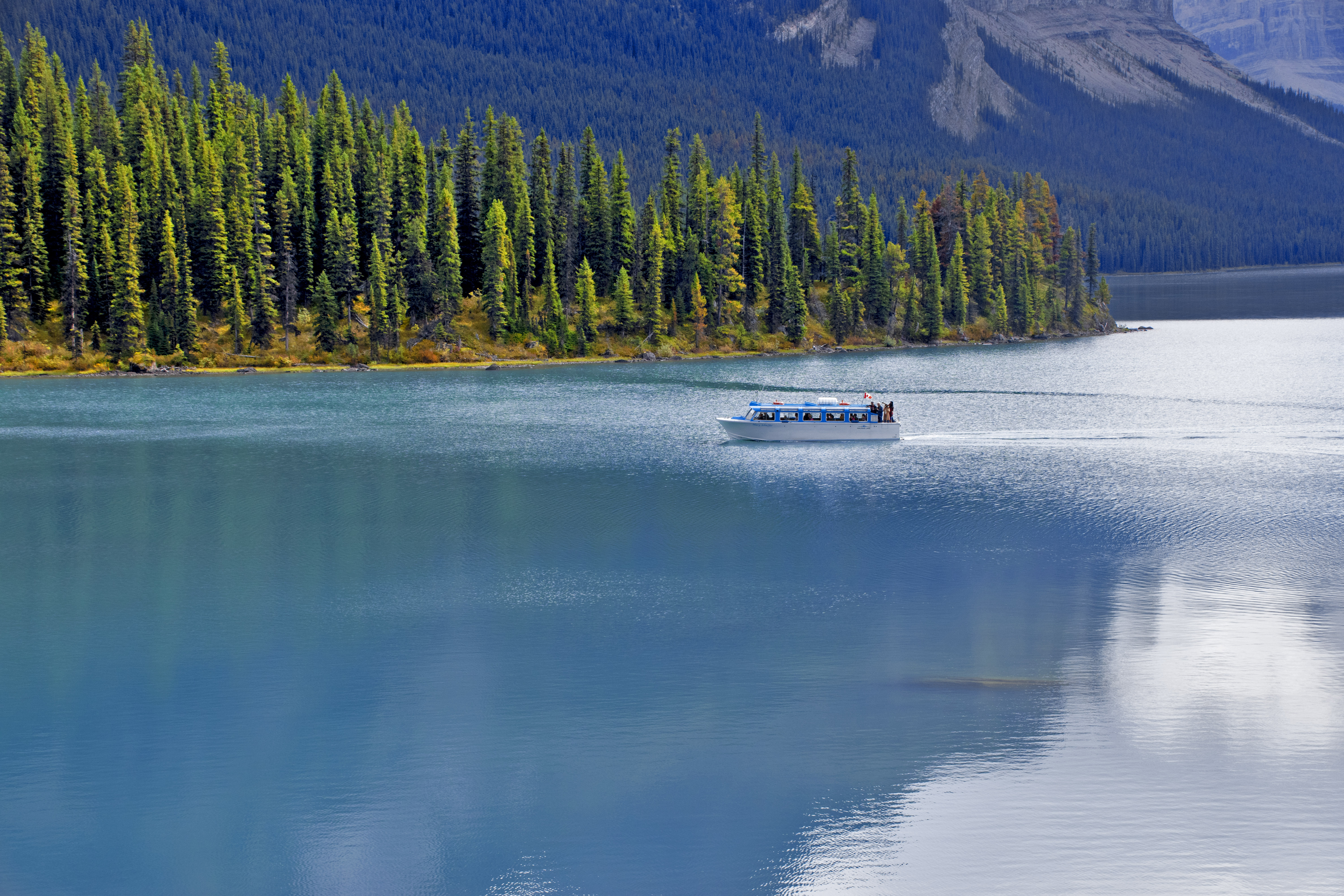
Tour Boat named the "Mary Schaffer" on the lake that she first recorded, Maligne Lake.

Schäffer's inexperience at surveying took its toll. Knowing full well that media attention awaited her return to Edmonton, she struggled through an initial false start followed by a loss of the surveying spool overboard. After nearly a month's wait for a new spool to be sent from Toronto, she was finally able to complete an accurate survey. Dr. Dowling encouraged her to send her measurements and map, complete with the names she had given various features around the lake, to the Geographical Board in Ottawa. Despite some opposition, Mary’s names were retained.

Schäffer's work was in part responsible for the incorporation of Maligne Lake in Jasper National Park. Had it not been for her, Maligne Lake may not have been preserved for the benefit of future generations.

In 1912 Schäffer moved permanently to Banff, Alberta. In 1915 she married her longtime friend and mountain guide William "Billy" Warren.

Mary Schäffer Warren published articles and books about her explorations of the Rockies. Many have been collected in This Wild Spirit: Women in the Rocky Mountains of Canada.

She died in 1939 in Banff.

== Written work ==
Mary Schäffer Warren published many articles and books describing her time exploring the Rockies:

In 1907 Schäffer published a book titled Old Indian Trails of the Canadian Rockies which she wrote throughout her expedition through, what is now, Banff and Jasper National Park.

In 1908 she wrote a book titled Among the sources of the Saskatchewan and Athabasca rivers.

== Legacy ==
In 1909, a mountain in Yoho National Park was named Mount Schaffer in her honor. In 2003, the University of Alberta named their newest student residence Schäffer Hall as a tribute to Schäffer Warren.

Janice Sanford Beck is the author of “No Ordinary Woman: The Story of Mary Schäffer Warren” (Rocky Mountain Books, 2001). Her latest works, “Life of the Trail 1” and “Life of the Trail 2”, are collaborations with Emerson Sanford that retrace the footsteps of early travelers (including David Thompson, Sir James Hector, and Mary Schäffer) in and around eastern Banff National Park and northern Yoho National Park.
