= Jasper Park Lodge =

Hotel in Alberta, Canada

Fairmont Jasper Park Lodge
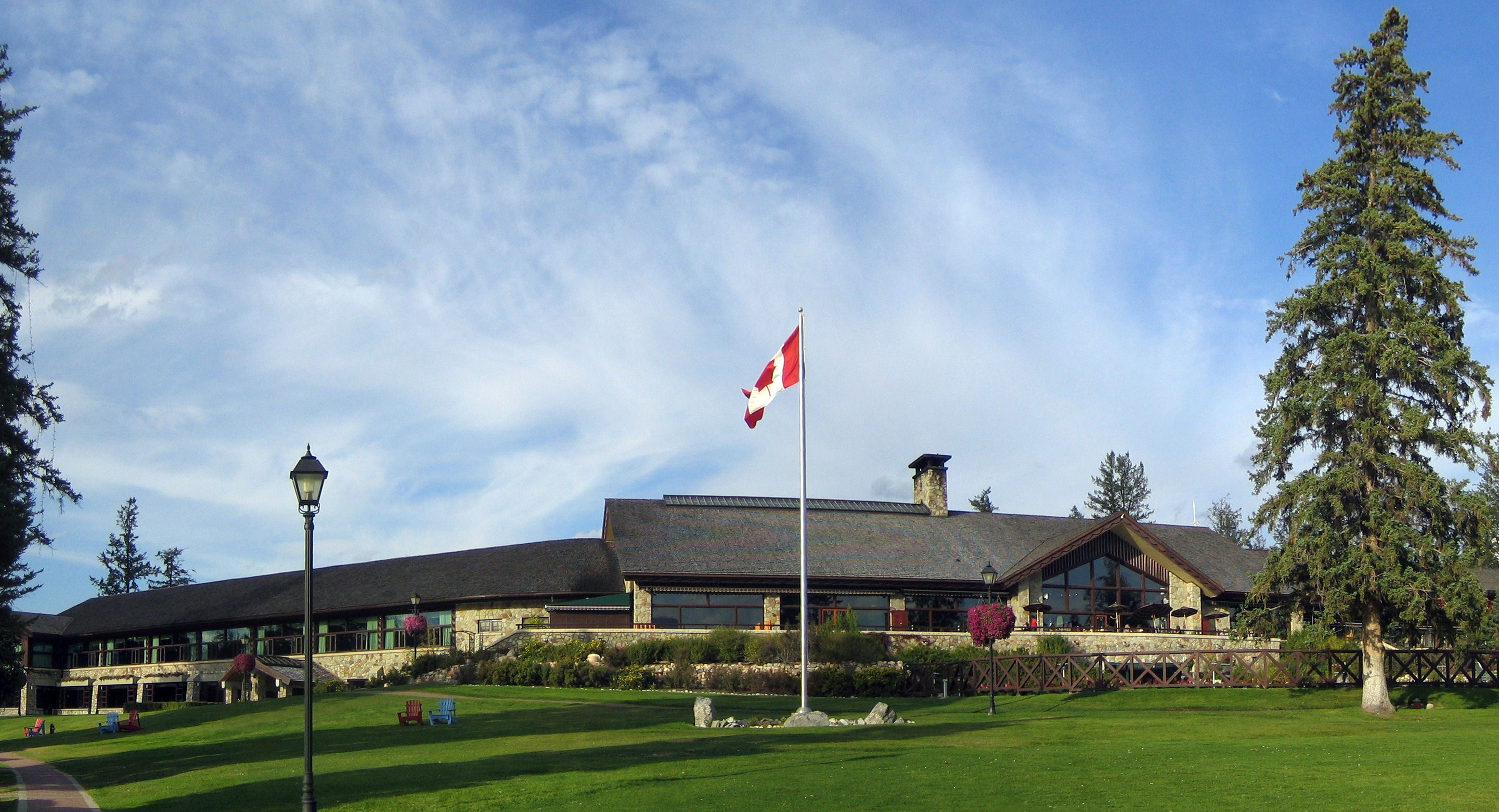
- Jasper Park Lodge, Alberta, Canada
- Interactive map of the Fairmont Jasper Park Lodge area
- Alternative names: Jasper Park Lodge

General information
- Architectural style: Rustic architecture
- Location: Jasper, Alberta, Canada
- Coordinates: 52°53′10″N 118°03′25″W
- Opened: June 1922
- Owner: Oxford Properties
- Management: Fairmont Hotels and Resorts / Accor

Other information
- Number of rooms: 442
- Number of restaurants: 5

Website
- fairmont.com/jasper

The Fairmont Jasper Park Lodge, formerly and commonly known as Jasper Park Lodge, is a 442-room hotel on a 2.8 km^{2} (700-acre) site along Lac Beauvert in Jasper National Park, Alberta, Canada. The hotel was established in 1921 by Canadian National Railway and is one of Canada's grand railway hotels.

== Hotel history ==
=== Grand Trunk Pacific Railway ===
In the early 1900s, the Government of Canada envisioned a new northern transcontinental railway to complement Canada's first transcontinental railway which ran closer to the Canada–US border. The Grand Trunk Railway under the subsidiary Grand Trunk Pacific Railway was contracted to construct and operate the Western Canadian portion of the new line after legislation was passed by Parliament in 1903. The Grand Trunk Pacific Railway followed the original Sandford Fleming "Canadian Pacific Survey" route from Jasper, Alberta through the Yellowhead Pass, which reached the Alberta/British Columbia border in November 1911. The Grand Trunk Pacific Railway's lines largely through the Yellowhead Pass were largely duplicated by Canadian Northern Railway shortly after construction. In March 1911, Grand Trunk Pacific Railway president Charles Melville Hays wrote Minister of the Interior Frank Oliver seeking land and the exclusive privilege to build and operate hotels in the Jasper Forest Park. Hays was eager to emulate the success of the Canadian Pacific Railway's grand hotels in Banff, Lake Louise, and Rogers Pass. Hays sought to build the Chateau Miette hotel near the Miette Hot Springs, and gain an exclusive lease for a rail line to the springs. The proposed location was identified later in 1911 by Arthur Oliver Wheeler whom the Grand Trunk Pacific Railway commissioned to map the Jasper Park and Mount Robson region to identify sites for hotels, chalets, and trails. The Government of Canada was not interested in providing an exclusive rights, and instead sought to offer land through a lease system.

The Grand Trunk Pacific Railway and local government officials were prepared to come to an agreement in 1912, with a design completed by the company, a proposed lease for 42 years, and suggested rent of $500 per year. However, the agreement was delayed by questions concerning school lands, and which department had jurisdiction over the waterways in the park. While the delay continued, the Grand Trunk Pacific Railway developed plans for two additional hotels, one near the Jasper townsite on Snape's Hill with an attached golf course allegedly designed with the assistance of Arthur Conan Doyle, and a second hotel on the south shore of Pyramid Lake. These plans came to a halt in 1914 when the Grand Trunk Pacific Railway ran low on funds and was nationalized in 1919 to form the Canadian National Railway. The failure of the railway came when the Government of Canada was finally prepared to approve the Miette lease, and later in February 1915, the Canadian government desperate for any form of accommodation in the area, asked the railways to construct cheap log cabins on the three sites.

=== Tent City, 1915 ===
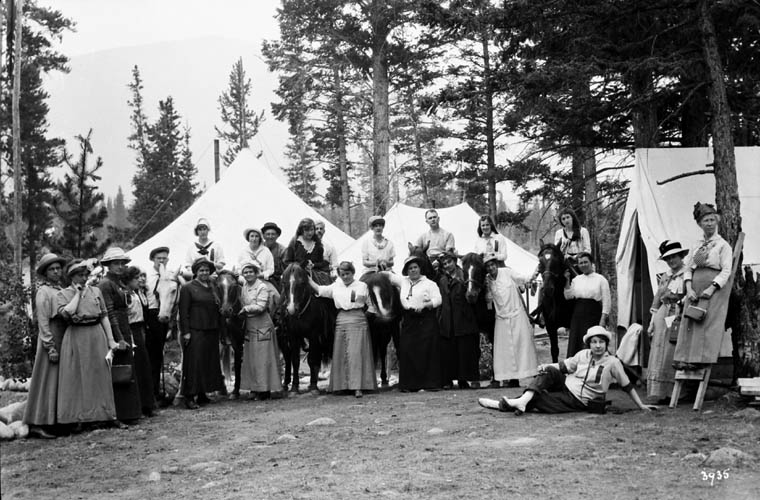
Press excursion at Tent City July 1915

Jasper in the early 1900s had a few hotels established during the construction of the railway, with eight listed as established in 1911. The earlies form of tourist accommodation along Lac Beauvert came in 1915 when Robert Kenneth of Edmonton, along with the pioneer outfitters Fred and Jack Brewster established "Tent City". Tent City was established with ten large sleeping tents with wooden walls and floors, and a cooking tent constructed along the lake front. Accommodation at Tent City was set at $2.50 or $3.00 per day, and a weekly rate of $15 or $18 was available and over 260 visitors stayed at the accommodation over the summer. The camp which officially opened on July 15, 1915, with regular attendees and a group from The Canadian Press, was successful in the summer of 1915, but failed to reopen after the end of the 1915 season due to the First World War.

On June 5, 1919, Jack and Fred Brewster returned from the war and purchased Tent City from Robert Kenneth and reopened the site. The 1919 season proved to be a success and the Brewsters expanded the camp in 1920 with a log kitchen, dining room, and dance pavilion.

=== Early years, 1921–1939 ===
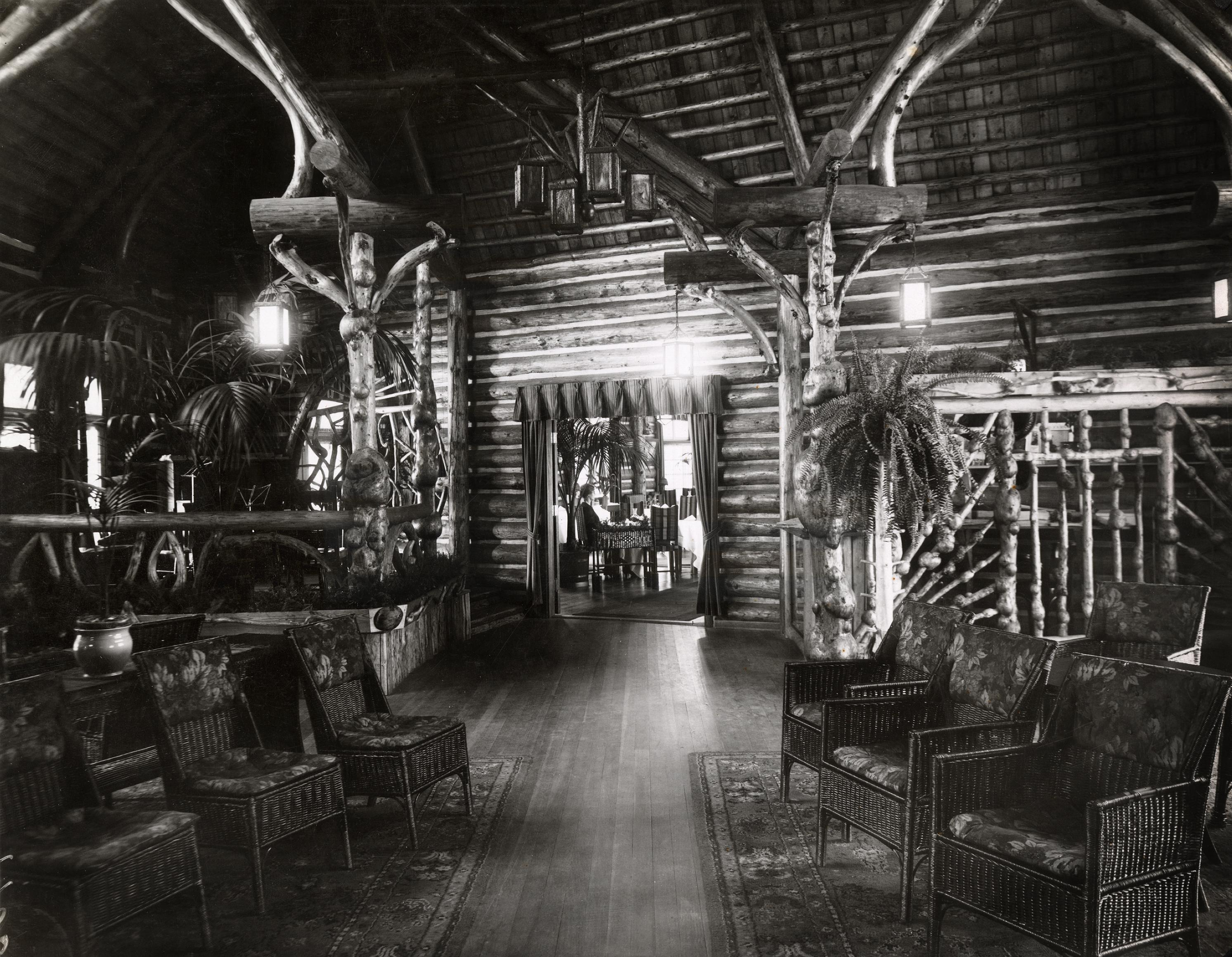
Interior of the Central Lodge in 1923

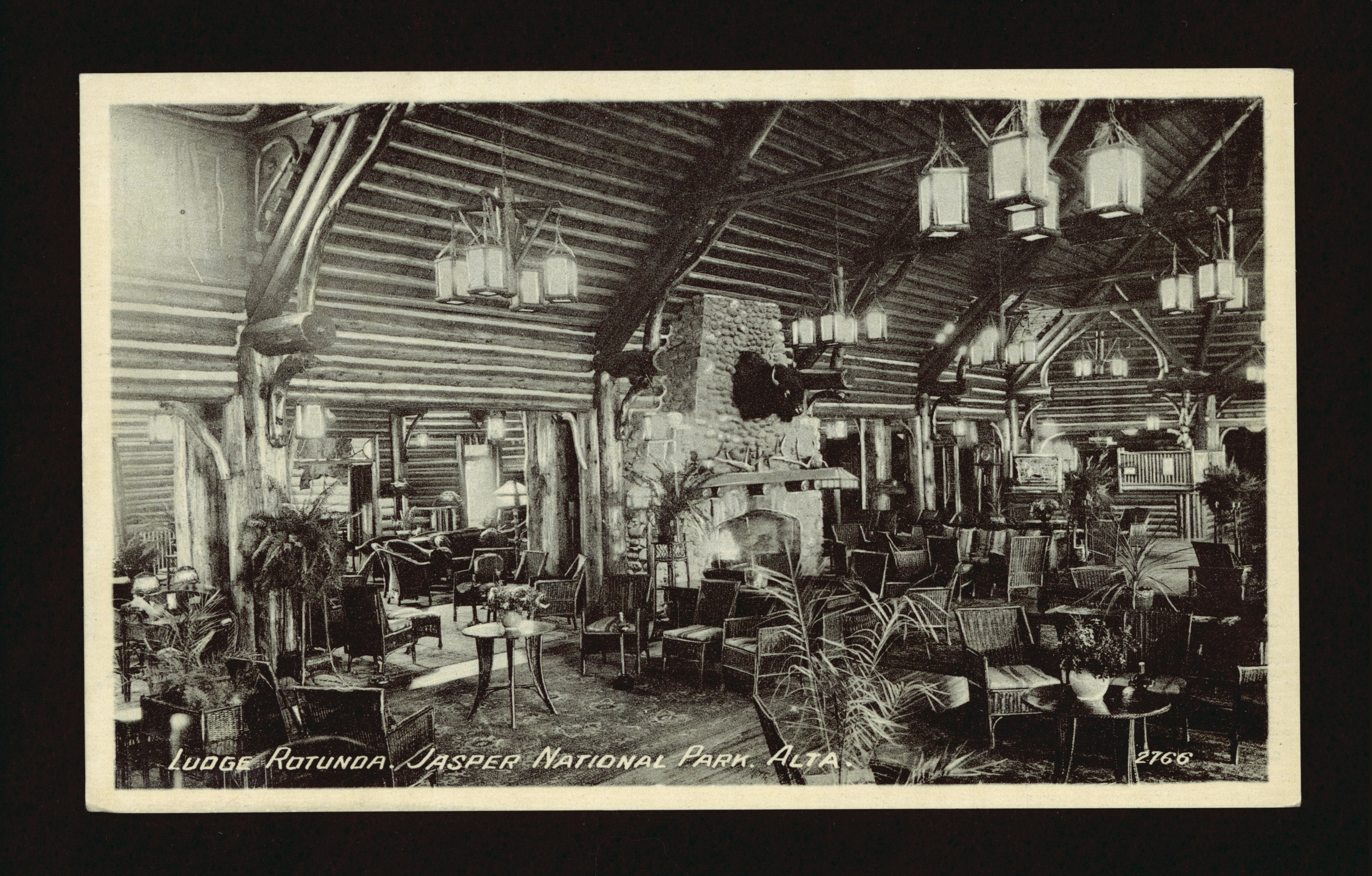
Interior of the Lodge Lounge around 1930

In 1921, the newly nationalized Canadian National Railways purchased "Tent City" and began plans for a hotel on the site, with the first bungalow opening in June 1922 under the name "Jasper Park Lodge".

The Canadian National Railway's chief architect, John Schofield, envisioned a hotel that altered the Athabasca Valley's view as little as possible, and blended seamlessly into the natural surroundings. Schofield planned for a number of small cabins made of rustic logs and fieldstone sprawling across the landscape, rather than the traditional large resort hotel.

Henry Worth Thornton, the new president of Canadian National Railways, visited Jasper in January 1923, and viewed the development favourably, as he sought to expand tourist developments along the rail line. During the winter of 1922–23, construction began on the new $461,000 Central Lodge and a number of new outlying bungalows designed by English architect Godfrey Milnes. The design of the Central Lodge used peeled logs on a fieldstone foundation, included lounges, dining room, snack room, kitchen, administrative offices, a large stone fireplace mounted animal heads, and was touted as the largest single-storey log building in the world. The Central Lodge was built using logs from the construction site and others cut from the nearby Maligne Canyon, with planed lumber hardwood floors brought from out of the area by train, and western red cedar from British Columbia for upright pillars. By 1925, Jasper Park Lodge consisted of over 50 log structures, and by 1927 there was accommodation for 425 guests.

In 1927 and 1928, the central lodge was expanded more than doubling the size of the building, and more cabins were built around Lac Beauvert. Additional new cabins were built between 1928 and 1931, including the luxury cabins Point, Outlook and Viewpoint, and other small cabins lifting the hotel's capacity to 550 guests. King George VI and his wife Queen Elizabeth visited Jasper during the 1939 royal tour of Canada, staying in the Outlook Cabin.

=== 1940s and the Second World War ===
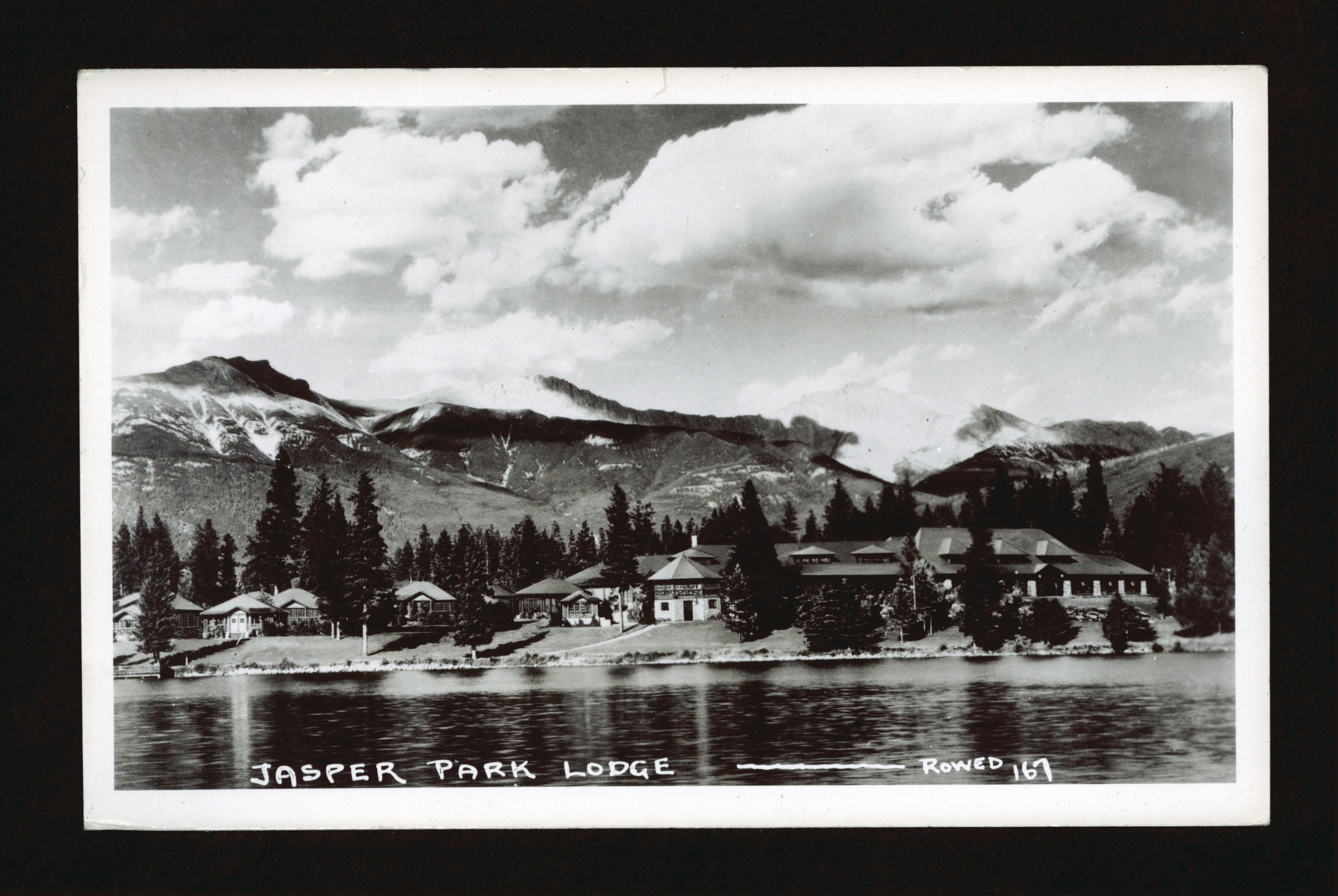
A view of Jasper Park Lodge from the lake taken in 1947.

Tourism in Jasper National Park grew significantly in 1940 as the Icefields Parkway connecting the park to Banff was completed. In 1939, 3,100 automobiles and 21,000 people were recorded entering Jasper National Park, which jumped to 19,000 automobiles and 83,000 people in 1940. The growth in tourism was short lived as Canada entered the Second World War, and Jasper Park Lodge closed to the public in fall of 1942 until spring of 1946 to contribute to the war effort. In the winter of 1943–44, Jasper Park Lodge was used as a winter training base for the Scottish Lovat Scouts special mountain troops.

Many of the original log bungalows were replaced in the late-1940s through to the 1960s in a modernization program.

=== 1950s and 1952 fire ===
On July 15, 1952, a fire broke out at the Central Lodge, destroying the entire building. One employee who marshalled guests out of the building died as a result of burns. The fire believed to be started due to defective wiring, was discovered around 9 p.m. by an employee in the cloakroom, and attempts by the staff to contain the blaze with a fire extinguisher were not successful as the fire spread into the main part of the building. The guests evacuated the lodge, while the on-site band continued to play Pittsburgh, Pennsylvania to calm the evacuating guests, and then left shortly afterwards. The town fire department was delayed as the telephone lines from the lodge were burnt before a call for assistance could be made, and the fire was reported from a forest fire lookout who initially believed the blaze was a controlled brush burn. Staff members, guests, RCMP, Jasper volunteer fire fighters, Canadian army personnel and pipeline workers assembled to fight the fire and prevent the spread to other cabins in the park. After the fire 26 guests chose to leave Jasper Park Lodge, and the remaining guests stayed while operations at the hotel returned.

At the time of the fire, Jasper Park Lodge had a rough plan for a new Central Lodge underway, and construction of the new design began within weeks of the fire. The new $3-million, 7,000-square-metre design included fire-proof steel, concrete, fieldstone and a cedar roof, with a four wing design that blended with the original bungalows and natural environment. The new concrete foundation was poured in late-September, and the steel-frame structure and roof were completed before winter weather came to Jasper. The new Central Lodge was completed on June 9, 1953.

=== Later history ===
Jasper Park Lodge was sold to Canadian Pacific Hotels in 1988 with a commitment to become a year-round resort destination. A five-year restoration and development was completed in 1994 to the 442 guest rooms and public amenities. Canadian Pacific Hotels was reorganized in 2001 and formed into Fairmont Hotels and Resorts. In 2006, the Jasper Park Lodge was purchased by Oxford Properties, the real estate investment arm of Ontario Municipal Employees Retirement System (OMERS), but it is operated by Fairmont Hotels and Resorts.

A $6.7 million Fairmont spa was added to the Lodge in fall 2010. In 2015–16, a $16 million renovation to all rooms (Fairmont, Deluxe, Junior Suites and Lakefront Suites) was completed to modernize the décor. Orso Trattoria, the hotel's first Italian restaurant, was also added to the dining options, which includes the Nook Chophouse, Emerald Lounge & Patio, Thompson's Terrace and Oka Sushi.

In 2015, the French hospitality company Accor paid $2.9 billion to acquire FRHI Hotels & Resorts including several historic Canadian hotels including Jasper Park Lodge, Hotel Macdonald, Banff Springs Hotel, Chateau Lake Louise, Château Frontenac, Château Laurier, Fairmont Royal York and Montreal's Queen Elizabeth Hotel.

In 2024, the Jasper wildfire destroyed or damaged a number of structures, but the main lodge was spared.

== Jasper Park Lodge Golf Club history ==
The wide-open valley along Lac Beauvert made the prospect of a golf course in the area feasible, and in 1922 the Dominion Parks Branch decided to build a golf course for use by visitors and Jasper residents. A simple nine-hole course was designed by Charlie Duncan, a golf professional from Banff, and work began on clearing boulders and bush. After slow construction in 1922 and 1923, the Canadian National Railway approached the Canadian government with an offer to take over the construction of the golf course. The Canadian National Railway commissioned Canadian golf course architect Stanley Thompson to design the 18-hole course. The 35-hectare (86-acre) site was cleared in the summer of 1923 by a team of 250 men, which found the topsoil insufficient for growing thick grass necessary for the course. The Canadian National Railway bought a quarter-section of farm land near Edmonton, stripped the topsoil and loaded it into trains to Jasper at great expense to complete the golf course. A 190,000-litre concrete dam was built along the mountainside to hold water for the course. The Jasper Park Lodge Golf Club opened on July 17, 1925, with Douglas Haig, 1st Earl Haig, the commander in chief of British Forces in the First World War, hitting the first ball. The course was renovated in 1928–29 in preparation for the Canadian Amateur Championship. In 1930, a clubhouse was constructed for the course, as well as a 23-bedroom building for golfers. The Jasper Park Lodge Golf Club held an annual "Totem Pole Tournament" from the 1920s to the 1950s, which was won by actor Bing Crosby in 1947.

The original design had the ninth hole situated far from the clubhouse, so three additional holes were constructed in 1950 to allow golfers to play nine holes and finish at the clubhouse. A new clubhouse was constructed in 1968 with a pro shop included.

== In popular culture ==
The Jasper Park Lodge has been featured and used in various films, TV shows and other forms of media. The first feature film at the lodge was the 1926 Fox Film Corporation The Country Beyond, three years later Fox returned with Under Suspicion, and director W. S. Van Dyke's Rose Marie in 1936. The Jasper Park Lodge hosted the filming for the Bing Crosby film The Emperor Waltz in 1946, with the location becoming a favorite of Crosby, returning multiple times over the years to compete in the Jasper Park Lodge's annual golf tournament.

In the 1950s the Jasper Park Lodge hosted Marilyn Monroe's River of No Return, and James Stewart's The Far Country. Monroe was evicted from the Jasper Park Lodge during the film shoot for repeatedly dressing inappropriately for dinner.
