= Snake Indian River =

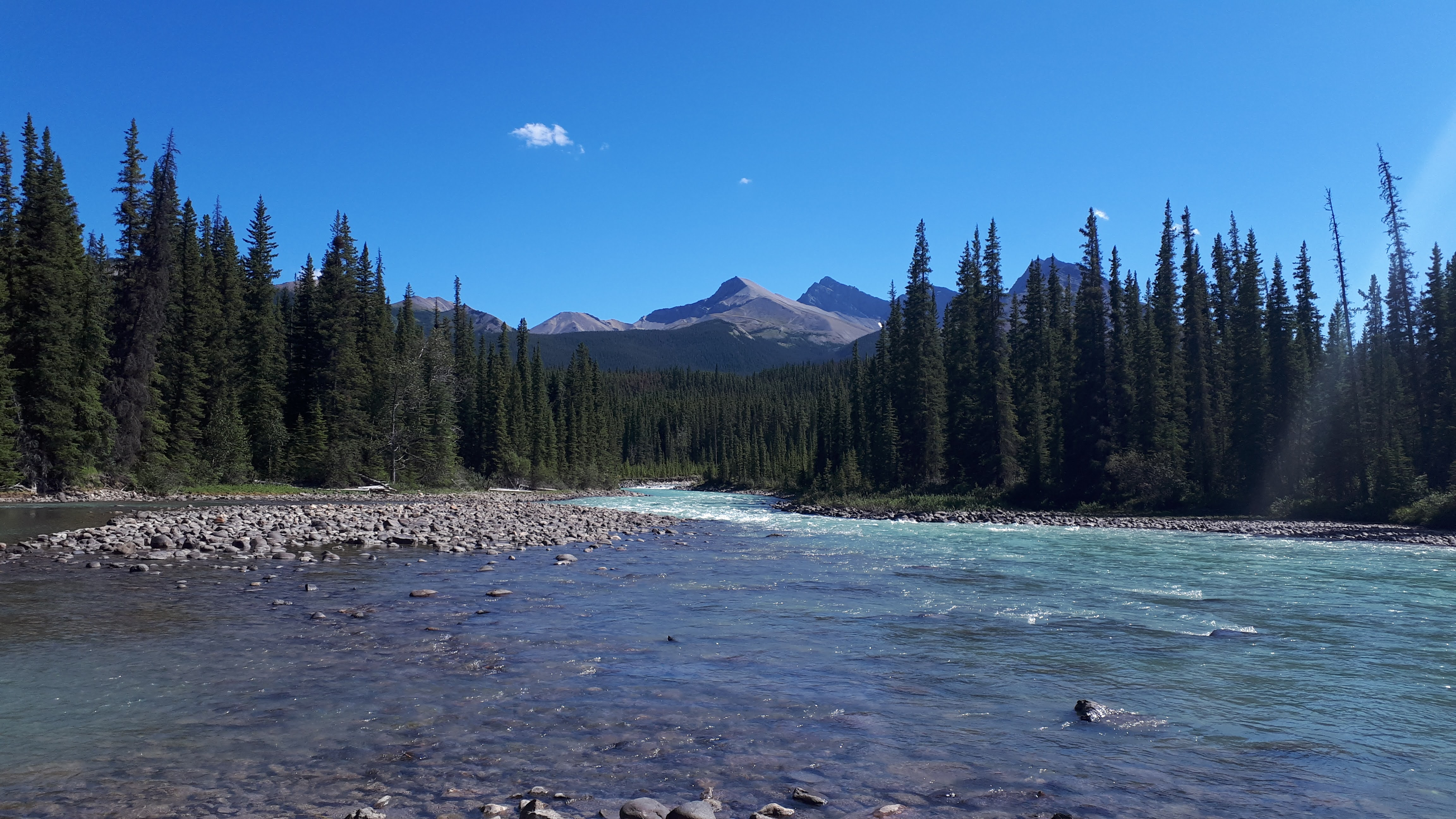
- The Snake Indian River in Jasper National Park

Location
- Country: Canada
- Province: Alberta

Physical characteristics
- Source
  - location: Snake Indian Pass
  - coordinates: 53°19′03″N 118°57′06″W
  - elevation: 2,128 m (6,982 ft)
- Mouth
  - location: Athabasca River
  - coordinates: 53°11′04″N 117°59′12″W
  - elevation: 1,039 m (3,409 ft)
- Length: 115 km (71 mi)

The Snake Indian River is a large tributary of the Athabasca River, exiting entirely within Jasper National Park. The Snake Indian forms at Snake Indian Pass, south of Monte Christo Mountain and Snake Indian Mountain, north of Calumet Peak. The river travels in a general northwest direction before turning sharply south. The river plummets over the massive Snake Indian Falls before joining the Athabasca River downstream of Jasper Lake, near the east gate of Jasper National Park.

The Snake Indian River, along with Snake Indian Mountain and Snake Indian Pass, were named after a small tribe of Indians, the Snakes, which resided around Jasper House in the 19th century. In Indigenous cultures, the term snake is a generic pejorative used to describe other tribes, regardless of their actual ancestry, hence the many locations in Alberta where a number of different tribes lived, all of whom, although unrelated, were called 'Snakes'. The Snakes who lived just north of Jasper were massacred by a band of Assiniboines at a peace feast between the two tribes.

== Tributaries ==
- Blue Creek
- Deer Creek
- Willow Creek

== See also ==
- List of Alberta rivers
