= Jasper Palisade =

The Jasper Palisade is a geologic formation of Jasper National Park, Alberta, Canada. It is so named because it has a sheer cliff face and vertical markings, reminiscent of palisade walls used as a protective enclosure around forts. The Palisade can be seen along Alberta Highway 16 (the Yellowhead Highway) in the west as the highway first crosses the Athabasca River approximately 19 km (12 mi) east of Jasper townsite.

The Palisade was once home to a forest fire lookout station, as it afforded a clear view of much of the Athabasca River Valley. The fire lookout has since been abandoned as more modern techniques of fire detection have become available. However, the clear view of the Athabasca River Valley remains, and one can hike to the crest of the Palisade from Pyramid Lake. This hike is approximately 10 km (6.2 mi) from the lake to the crest and the elevation gain is approximately 800 m (2,600 ft).
