= 2024 Jasper wildfire =

Wildfire in Alberta, Canada

- Part of the 2024 Canada wildfires
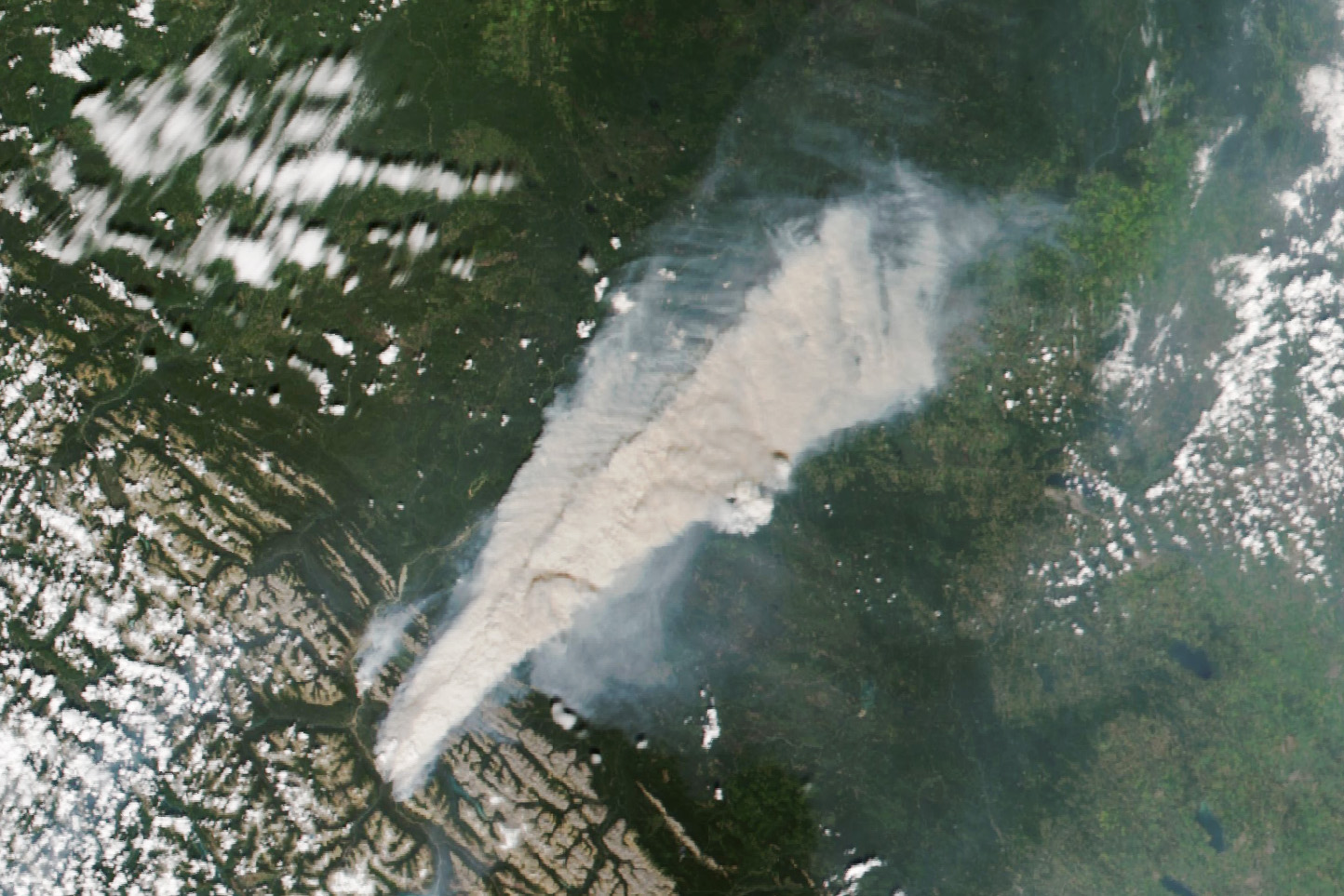
- Satellite image of smoke from the fire on July 23, 2024
- Date: July 22, 2024 – April 1, 2025
- Location: Jasper, Alberta, Canada

Statistics
- Total area: 39,000 hectares (96,000 acres)

Impacts
- Deaths: 1 firefighter
- Evacuated: 25,000+
- Structures destroyed: 358 (townsite)

Ignition
- Cause: Lightning, wind and dry conditions

Map

The 2024 Jasper wildfire was a wildfire complex that burned in July 2024 in Jasper National Park in Alberta, Canada. Fires started north and south of the resort town of Jasper and grew out of control, and on July 22 they forced a mass evacuation of 25,000 residents, workers, and visitors. The fires merged and swept through the town, destroying 358 of its 1,113 structures. The evacuation order lasted until August 17, but fires to the south continued to burn out of control. On September 7 Parks Canada announced that the wildfire was under control with the fire estimated to be 32,722 hectares (80,860 acres) in size, and was declared extinguished on April 1, 2025. One firefighter was killed in efforts to contain the blaze, and insurance companies paid $880 million in claims, making it one of the most expensive natural disasters in Canadian history. The Jasper fire topped the list of Canada's 10 most impactful weather stories of 2024.

== Progression ==
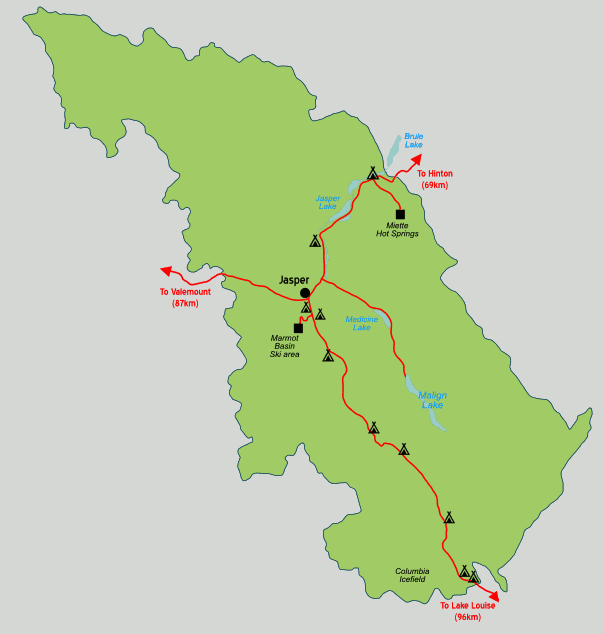
Map of Jasper National Park

On July 22, 2024, at 7:00 pm MDT, Parks Canada reported a wildfire northeast of the town of Jasper. Shortly after, a second wildfire was reported south of the townsite. At 8:35 pm, the Municipality of Jasper and Jasper National Park issued 'preventive' evacuation alerts. By 10:00 pm, an evacuation order was issued for the entire park, and the park was closed indefinitely. On July 23, it was reported that the south fire was 12 km (7.5 mi) from the townsite with an estimated size of 6,750 hectares, while the north fire was estimated to be 270 hectares in size.

On July 23, service on the CN Rail main transcontinental line through Jasper was suspended, with CN sending one of its firefighting trains to the town that same day.

By the morning of July 24, the south fire grew to 10,800 hectares in size and was 8 km (5.0 mi) from Jasper, while the north fire remained the same size and was 5 km (3.1 mi) away. At 6:40 pm on July 24, powerful winds pushed the south fire, causing it to reach the townsite. At 8:00 pm, wildland firefighters and other personnel without self-contained breathing apparatuses began evacuating to Hinton due to deteriorating air quality, while structural firefighters remained to protect critical infrastructure and save as many structures as possible. At 10:00 pm, Parks Canada reported that significant loss had occurred within the townsite.

By July 25, roughly 25,000 people had been evacuated, and videos surfaced showing various buildings and structures destroyed by the fire in the southern part of the town. Later that day, park officials reported that the north and south fires had merged. Including an earlier wildfire near Miette Hot Springs, the Jasper wildfire complex was estimated to be 36,000 hectares in size, which was later lowered to 32,000 hectares following an aerial survey. On July 26, Parks Canada revealed that 358 of the 1,113 structures within the Jasper townsite were damaged by the wildfire while all critical infrastructure such as the hospital, schools, and wastewater treatment plant were saved. On July 27, the Municipality of Jasper released a map and list of addresses of the structures damaged by the fire.

A Parks Canada official explained the wildfire was the largest the park had recorded in the last 100 years and could continue to burn for months. Experts determined that a fire tornado may have formed, burning hundreds of homes. According to a report conducted by the Canadian Forest Service, fire-induced winds caused tree damage and ground scouring comparable to an EF-4 to EF-5 tornado.

An update from Parks Canada on August 1 indicated the wildfire had grown substantially and was now 39,000 hectares (96,000 acres), with more growth expected.

On August 17, Parks Canada and the Municipality of Jasper lifted the evacuation alert for Jasper after the wildfire was classified as being held. On September 7, Parks Canada announced that the wildfire was under control with the fire estimated to be 32,722 hectares (80,860 acres) in size. On April 1, 2025, the wildfire was declared as extinguished.

=== Fatality ===
On August 3, 2024, a wildland firefighter was killed after he was hit by a falling tree while fighting the wildfire northeast of Jasper. The man was subsequently identified as 24-year-old Morgan Kitchen, who was a resident of Calgary and based out of the Rocky Mountain House firebase. On July 29, 2026, six charges were laid against the Ministry of Forestry and Parks under the province's OHS Act for alleged workplace safety violations in connection to Kitchen's death such as failing to keep workers safe by not adequately identifying and managing hazards, and inadequate training.

== Evacuation efforts ==
Due to the north and south wildfires converging, Highway 16 and Highway 93 within the park were closed. Anyone travelling towards Jasper was told to turn around. Evacuees travelling from Jasper were ordered by emergency personnel to continue to travel westbound on Highway 16. A welcome centre was established in Valemount, British Columbia as a place for evacuees to rest, although reception centres were quickly overwhelmed, and hotels and lodges were also at breaking capacity. Evacuees seeking government support were directed to go to emergency reception centres in Calgary and Grande Prairie. Buses were brought in to Valemount and Prince George to transport evacuees to the reception centres in Calgary and Grande Prairie, respectively, while one bus was arranged to transport people in Jasper to Edmonton, Alberta.

== Disaster response and aftermath ==
Parks Canada said in a statement on July 25 that a disaster response team had been formed to support affected communities. More than 250 wildland–urban interface personnel from across Alberta arrived on July 27 and hundreds of firefighters from Canada, Australia, and South Africa arrived the following day to help battle the wildfire.

The federal government provided $2 million for local businesses in the aftermath. The Alberta government provided a one-time payment of $1,250 per adult and $500 per children under 18 for Jasper residents to cover expenses. In addition, the Canadian Red Cross provided a payment of $750 per household that has registered with the organization. The provincial and federal government also committed to match donations made to the Canadian Red Cross with a deadline set for August 24.

Re-entry for Jasper residents opened on August 16. Areas outside of the townsite gradually reopened to the public beginning with Miette Hot Springs on August 18. By December 2024, areas and trails that were assessed for fire danger such as Pyramid Bench, Old Fort Point, Lake Edith, Maligne Lake and Skyline Trail reopened.

Landmarks in Jasper such as the Athabasca Hotel, Jasper Skytram, Jasper station, Jasper the Bear statue, Jasper-Yellowhead Museum & Archives, and Marmot Basin were undamaged by the wildfire. Jasper Park Lodge experienced property damage but the main lodge and some structures were spared while the HI Jasper and Athabasca Falls hostels were destroyed. Two churches, St. Mary & St. George Anglican Church and the Jasper United Church, were destroyed. The Maligne Canyon Wilderness Kitchen and all structures at the Maligne Wilderness Hostel were destroyed while the Maligne Lake area was spared. Campgrounds and commercial accommodations outside of the townsite experienced varying degrees of damage with 16 of the 72 structures at Whistlers Campground destroyed while all 23 structures at Jasper House Bungalows were destroyed. The Palisades Center also sustained significant damage in the north fire, with 8 of the 14 structures destroyed, including several federally recognized heritage buildings.

The fires cost $880 million in insurance claims, making it the ninth most expensive natural disaster for insurance companies in Canadian history.

In July 2025, a report commissioned by the Municipality of Jasper found that the UCP provincial government, which was not jurisdictionally responsible for the area, created extra work for emergency response leaders with inquiries and attempts to exercise authority outside of the existing Parks Canada-Municipality of Jasper integrated command structure.

== See also ==
- List of fires in Canada
- 2024 Western megafires
- Lytton wildfire
