= Jasper National Park =

National park in Alberta, Canada

- Parc national Jasper
- IUCN category II (national park)
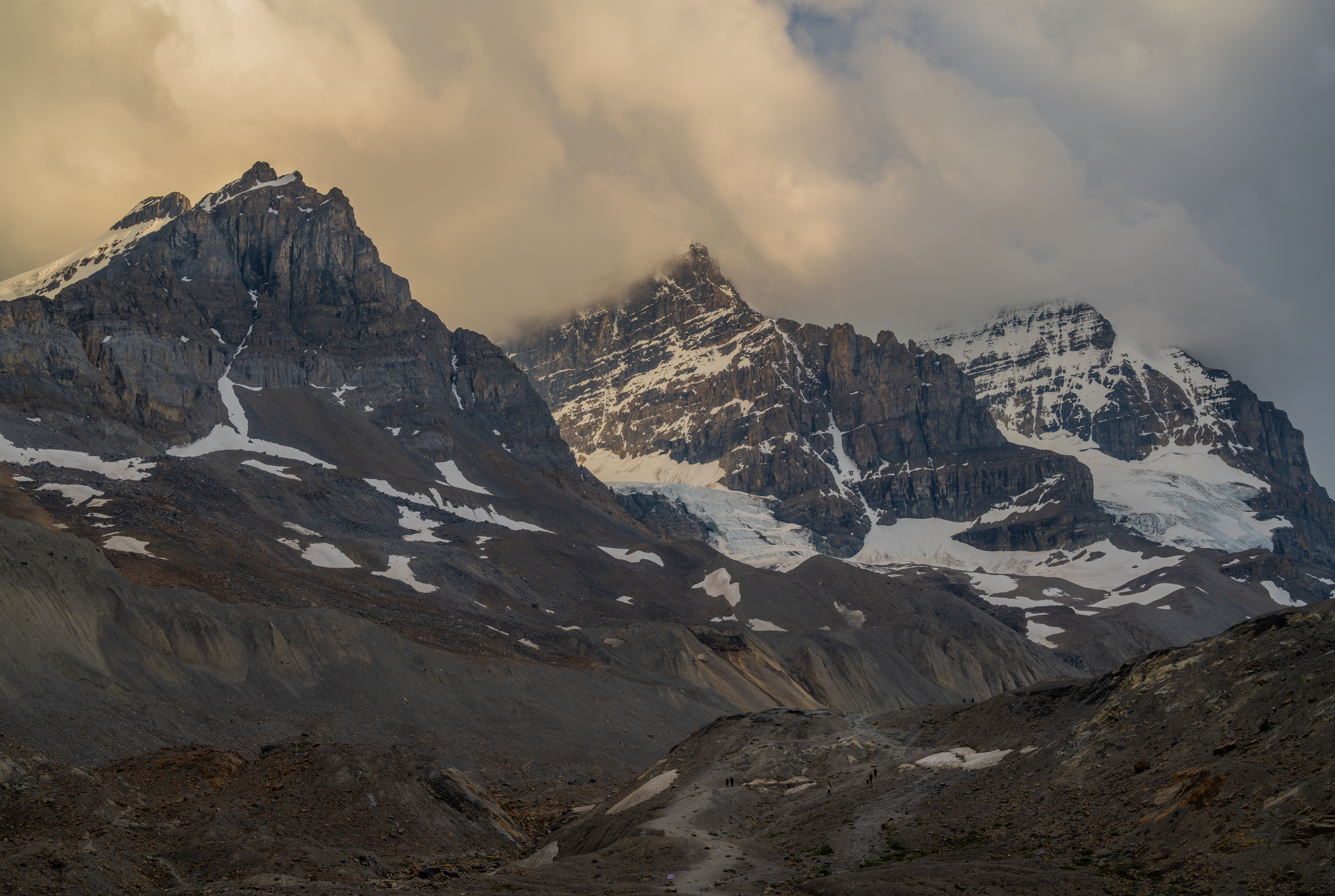
- Mount Andromeda in Jasper National Park

- Location within Canada Location within Alberta
- Interactive map of Jasper National Park
- Location: Alberta, Canada
- Nearest town: Jasper
- Coordinates: 52.8°N 117.9°W
- Area: 10,878 km^{2} (4,200 sq mi)
- Established: 14 September 1907
- Visitors: 2,415,463 (in 2022–23)
- Governing body: Parks Canada
- Website: parks.canada.ca/pn-np/ab/jasper

UNESCO World Heritage Site
- Part of: Canadian Rocky Mountain Parks
- Criteria: Natural: (vii), (viii)
- Reference: 304
- Inscription: 1984 (8th Session)

Jasper National Park, in Alberta, Canada, is the largest national park within Alberta's Rocky Mountains, spanning 11,000 km^{2} (4,200 sq mi). It was established as Jasper Forest Park in 1907, renamed as a national park in 1930, and declared a UNESCO World Heritage Site in 1984. Its location is north of Banff National Park and west of Edmonton. The park contains the glaciers of the Columbia Icefield, springs, lakes, waterfalls and mountains.

== History ==
=== First Nations ===
The territory encompassed by what is now Jasper National Park has been inhabited since time immemorial by Nakoda, Cree, Secwépemc, and Dane-zaa peoples. Plainview projectile points have been found at the head of Jasper Lake, dating back to between 8000 and 7000 BCE. In the centuries between then and the establishment of the park, First Nations land use has fluctuated according to climatic variations over the long term, and according to cyclical patterns of ungulate population numbers, particularly elk, moose, mule deer, and occasionally caribou. Starting in the 1790s, Haudenosaunee and Nipissing hunters and trappers moved in large numbers to the eastern side of the Rocky Mountains, around the headwaters of the Athabasca and Smoky Rivers in particular, most of them employed by the North West Company. By the early 19th century, there were hundreds of Haudenosaunee and Anishinaabe people living in the region.

=== Fur trade ===
Searching for a new route to the Columbia River, David Thompson's brigade reached the upper Athabasca in December 1810, led by a Haudenosaunee guide named Thomas. After some weeks hunting and making preparations for the trip over Athabasca Pass, the group left William Henry with their supply cache, building a hut and shed. Henry's House is presumed to have been just north of present-day Old Fort Point across the Athabasca River from the town of Jasper. Thompson's brigade crossed Athabasca Pass in January 1811 and returned in May 1812 after which the old fort was abandoned.

In 1813, François Decoigne built a new supply depot for the North West Company on Brûlé Lake. Jasper National Park's name originates from Jasper Haws, a Maryland-born fur trader who in 1817 took command of the post, which subsequently became known as Jasper's House. The route over Athabasca Pass was too labourious for freighting large volumes of fur. Called the York Factory Express, it linked Hudson Bay with the Pacific and was primarily used to move correspondence and people over the continental divide.

In the early 1820s, the British government forcibly merged the Hudson's Bay Company with the North West Company. The new governor George Simpson visited the area to inspect posts and decide on operational changes. Simpson instructed Chief Trader J. F. Larocque to build a post on Cranberry or Moose Lake, in Yellowhead Pass in 1824. Larocque instead built 8 huts at the present-day location of the town of Jasper. The next year, Simpson visited Larocque's House and promptly ordered it closed.

Especially from 1826 through 1829, Yellowhead Pass was also used to get critical goods—leather in particular—to the New Caledonia posts. Jasper House's role was to facilitate trips over these passes, by providing horses (or snowshoes) and other supplies to westbound brigades. Around 1829, during the management of Michel Klyne, Jasper House was relocated further up the Athabasca River, just north of Jasper Lake. Until the mid 1840s, the post also periodically traded for furs with Haudenosaunee and Métis groups who stayed nearby regularly, and Secwépemc from west of Yellowhead Pass. These residents of the upper Athabasca, Snake Indian, and Smoky Rivers supplied significant numbers of beaver, marten, and lynx furs. The Company would later estimate that in 1836, there was a local Indigenous population of approximately 200.

At the end of this period of activity, in 1846, Jasper House hosted several notable travelers. In April, the priest Pierre-Jean De Smet arrived, accompanied by Louis Kwarakwante's extended family, numbering 36. Kwarakwante, also called Calahoo and Sun Traveller, had resided with his family in the area since 1801, and had married and traded with neighbouring Haudenosaunee, Cree, and Dane-zaa. De Smet remained performing rites and hunting with Kwarakwante's and the postmaster Colin Fraser's family before continuing up the Athabasca on April 25 and crossing the pass by showshoe on May 6. Roche De Smet, the mountain immediately west of Jasper House, was named in his honour.

Shortly before reaching the pass, De Smet met Lieutenants Henry James Warre and Mervin Vavasour who had been spying for the British in the Oregon Country and were returning east with a Hudson's Bay Company brigade and 15 Indigenous porters. Now over the pass, Warre and company traded their snowshoes for horses and continued down to Jasper House. Warre sketched the Whirlpool River Valley and Jasper House; the latter showing the post's log buildings and many tipis of Indigenous families.

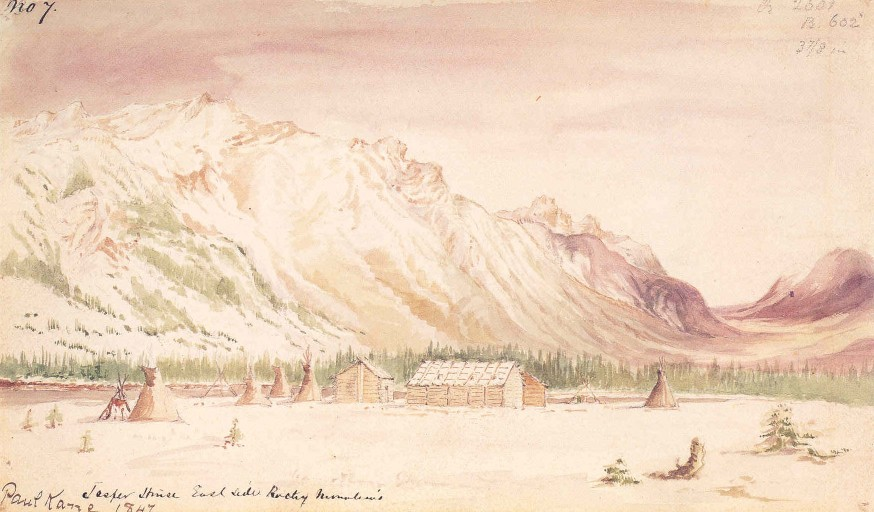
Paul Kane's sketch of Jasper House in November 1846.

That November, artist Paul Kane arrived, sketching the Athabasca and Whirlpool valleys from vantage points including Brûlé Lake, Jasper House, and Old Fort Point. These illustrations show easily recognizable features such as Roche Miette (which he called "Meayets Rock"), Pyramid Mountain ("the Cascades"), and Pyramid Bench. Compared to the modern landscape condition, there is far less vegetation in Kane's sketches, emphasizing the effects of nearly a century of fire suppression after the government began managing the area in 1907. Prior to Kane's visit, there had been fires in the Athabasca Valley in 1795, 1808, 1830, and 1840. Kane's notes describe Jasper House itself as, "three miserable log huts".

Beginning in 1847, the post was inactive until the company reopened it in 1858 with Henry John Moberly as chief factor. Moberly traded with, and was guided by, Louis Kwarakwante. Moberly had two sons with Kwarakwante's daughter Suzanne (b. 1824 at Jasper House): Ewan in 1859 and John in 1861. Moberly resigned from the Company in June 1861 and in October traveled with Suzanne to Lac St. Anne to be married. They split shortly after, with Moberly heading east and Suzanne returning to the Jasper area to raise her children.

The Hudson's Bay Company continued sending employees to Jasper House twice per year to collect a steady supply of furs from the local Indigenous population until finally closing the post for good in 1874. Indigenous peoples in the area continued to supply furs. Still, they were collected at less remote posts such as Edmonton, Lac La Biche and Lesser Slave Lake. In 1910, the remains of Jasper House were destroyed. It was designated a national historic site in 1924.

=== Jasper Park established ===
Year	Area	Notes
1907	12,950 square kilometres (5,000 sq mi)	Park created.
1911	2,590 square kilometres (1,000 sq mi)	Reduced to a strip on either side of the railroad.
1914	11,396 square kilometres (4,400 sq mi)	Restored to nearly its original size.
1927	13,934 square kilometres (5,380 sq mi)	Parts of Rocky Mountain (Banff) National Park temporarily assigned to Jasper.
1929	11,709 square kilometres (4,521 sq mi)	The north boundary changed to the heights of land rather than a straight line.
1930	10,878 square kilometres (4,200 sq mi)	The National Parks Act prohibited resource extraction; coal-bearing areas in the east were divested to the province of Alberta.

Jasper Forest Park was established by a federal Order in Council on September 14, 1907. The approximately 12,950 square kilometres (5,000 sq mi) were carved out of the Rocky Mountain Forest Reserve, and covered an area bounded on the west by the continental divide, on the south by the divide between the Athabasca and North Saskatchewan watersheds, on the north by a straight line at 53°35′ north, and on the east by "the base of the foothills". The boundary was somewhat clarified by another order in council in 1909, but because the area was unsurveyed, the southeastern portion remained vague for years.

The park's establishment was spurred by plans for the construction of additional Canadian transcontinental railways built through Edmonton, the Canadian Northern Railway and Grand Trunk Pacific Railway, which were to cross the Rocky Mountains at Yellowhead Pass. Jasper Park was intended to be developed into an alpine resort similar to Banff National Park, at the time known as Rocky Mountains Park, with a train station, tourist hotels, and a service town. Jasper Park was intended to occupy the same position to the railways that Banff National Park already had to the Canadian Pacific Railway. Collectively, the mountain parks were intended as a sort of wilderness playground for middle-class workers, an antidote to the malaise of modern life.

However, the vision of wilderness on which Jasper Park's development plan depended was at odds with the presence of long-established Métis homesteads within the park, many of whom were descended from the white and Haudenosaunee fur traders and trappers employed by the North West Company and the Hudson's Bay Company in the 19th century. In 1909, six Métis families living in Jasper Park were declared squatters, paid compensation for improvements made to the land, including buildings, ditches, and fences, and ordered to leave the park. The American Lewis Swift had also settled in the area in the 1890s to farm, raise livestock, and trade. Expecting to be able to sell his land at a premium to the railroad, and later the government, he refused to leave. Swift was made Jasper's first game warden and was granted title for his homestead in 1911.

With the passing of The Dominion Forest Reserves and Parks Act, 1911, Jasper Forest Park came under the administration of the newly established Dominion Parks Branch of the Department of the Interior under Parks Commissioner James Harkin, at which time the name was changed to simply Jasper Park. Minister of the Interior Frank Oliver expanded the overall size of the Forest Reserve but dramatically reduced the parks within. Jasper was reduced to a strip 16 kilometres (10 mi) north and south of the railway, which had reached the park that year. Now just 2,600 km^{2} (1,000 sq mi), the tourist destination was shorn of many of its biggest attractions, such as Maligne Lake, Mount Edith Cavell, and the Columbia Icefields. Due to the protests of the railways and Jasper's commercial guides, this reduction was rescinded in 1914. The boundaries would change repeatedly until being finally established by the National Parks Act in 1930.

Under Harkin, Canada's national parks were to fulfill a dual mandate of wilderness protection and economic development—primarily as tourist destinations. In particular, the Parks Branch expressly forbade hunting in Jasper and the other mountain parks, deprecating First Nations' centuries-long history of subsistence hunting in the region as indiscriminate slaughter of the local game wildlife. Despite the prohibition on hunting, the park and its tourist facilities became a base of operations for wealthy Canadian and American sport hunters for hunting trips further into the Rockies, beyond the prohibitions in place in the mountain parks and the Rocky Mountains Forest Reserve.

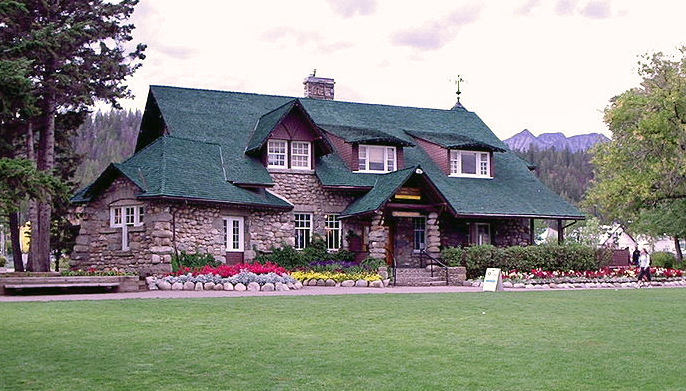
The Jasper Park Information Centre, originally constructed in 1914 as an administration building and as the park superintendent's residence

=== Early tourism and sport ===
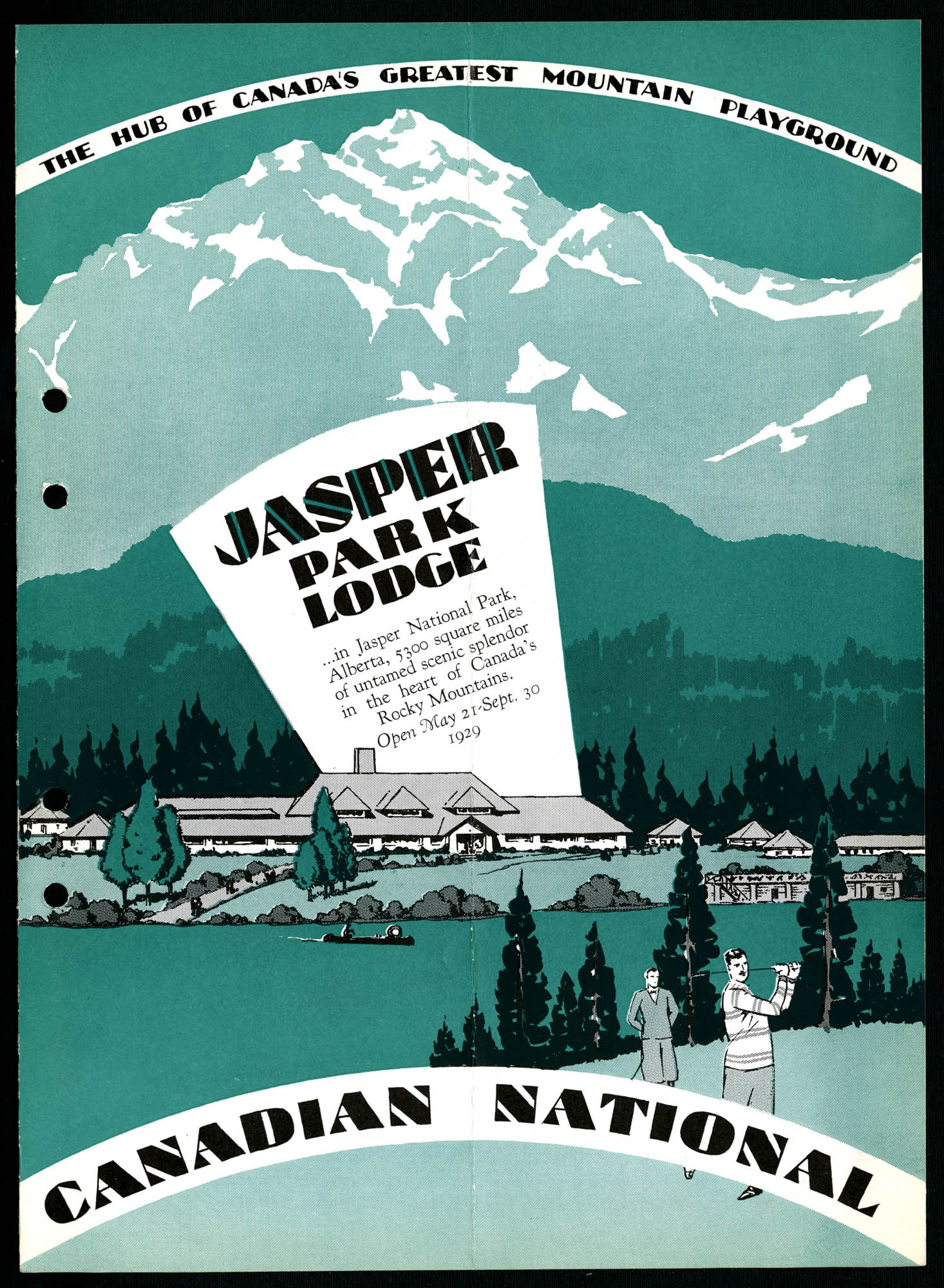
CNR advertisement, 1929

When Mary Schäffer Warren visited Maligne Lake—known by the Nakoda as Chaba Imne—in 1908, she did so by following a map given to her by Samson Beaver, a Nakoda guide and hunter.

In 1911, the Grand Trunk Pacific (GTP) laid track through the park and over Yellowhead Pass. That same year, the GTP founded the town of Fitzhugh around the company's railway station; the town was renamed Jasper in 1913. The GTP's route across the pass was followed in 1913 by the Canadian Northern (CNoR). Both having fallen into financial difficulty, the two railways were nationalized—the CNoR in 1919 and the GTP in 1923—and eventually merged into the Canadian National Railway (CNR) by an order in council. The railway was later followed by a road built between Edmonton and Jasper. The section between the town of Jasper and the eastern gate of the park was completed in 1928; however, it took another three years for the province of Alberta to complete the remaining stretch of the road from Edmonton.

By the time the GTP's railway track cleared Yellowhead Pass in 1911, there were already eight hotels established in Jasper, but they were rudimentary. They did not meet the expectations of the well-heeled clientele to which the GTP advertised. Jasper Park Lodge, the focal point of the GTP's Jasper advertising campaign, did not open until 1922, three years after the company's bankruptcy and only a year before the railway was merged into the nationally owned CNR. Like the GTP before it, Canadian National featured both Jasper Park and the lodge prominently in its advertising literature.

From its founding, the town of Jasper, and later the Jasper Park Lodge, served as a hub for a variety of outdoor sporting activities. Outfitters sprang up in the park to rent out equipment and guide sightseers, skiers, and alpinists. The Alpine Club of Canada, formed in 1906 and sponsored through the 1920s in part by the CNR, held seven of its annual alpine camps in Jasper between 1926 and 1950. And while hunting was forbidden within park grounds, the park's facilities served as a base of operations for outfitters and guides who led wealthy hunters on hunting trips into the forest reserves outside Jasper's boundaries.

=== Internment camps ===
In 1916, following the precedent set at Rocky Mountains Park, the Government of Canada opened an internment camp for individuals deemed enemy aliens, primarily immigrants from the German Empire, the Austro-Hungarian Empire, including Ukrainians, who made up the largest affected population, and the Ottoman Empire. The interned men were primarily employed in the construction of a road from the town of Jasper, along the Maligne River first to Medicine Lake, and later on to Maligne Lake.

In 1931, in response to the Great Depression, the government of Prime Minister R. B. Bennett enacted the Unemployment and Farm Relief Act, which allocated funds for public works projects in the national parks. Labourers, many of them laid-off Canadian National Railway workers, were employed on road and bridge projects within the park, for which they were paid 25 to 30 cents per hour, working eight hours a day up to six days per week. In October 1931, under the auspices of the relief project, construction started on a road between Jasper and Banff, which ultimately formed the basis for the Icefields Parkway.

Internment camps were established again during World War II, when three hundred Japanese Canadians were forcibly sent to three road camps in Jasper. Additionally, 160 conscientious objectors, many of them Mennonites from the Prairie provinces, were interned at Jasper and put to work upgrading the Maligne Lake and Medicine Lake roads, as well as building a road from Geikie to the British Columbia border.

=== Conservation and recent history ===
In 1930, Jasper Forest Park officially became Jasper National Park with the passing of the National Parks Act. Section 4 of the act further underlined the park's wilderness preservation function, with Canada's National Parks "dedicated to the people of Canada for their benefit, education and enjoyment" and "maintained and made use of so as to leave them unimpaired for the enjoyment of future generations". Ironically, given its mandate to preserve natural spaces, the act also redefined Jasper Park's boundaries, removing 518 square kilometres (200 sq mi) of land from the park—including Brûlé Lake and Rock Lake—opening the excised area to coal mining and hydroelectric development.

In 1984, Jasper and the six other Canadian Rocky Mountain Parks – Banff, Kootenay, Yoho, Hamber, Mount Robson, and Mount Assiniboine – were collectively declared a UNESCO World Heritage Site for their, "rugged mountain peaks, ice fields, and glaciers, alpine meadows, lakes, waterfalls, extensive karst cave systems, thermal springs and deeply incised canyons".

Since 1999, the arrival of the mountain pine beetle has impacted the park with 93,000 hectares of the park's forest infested with the beetle by 2017. In 2016, Parks Canada released the Mountain Pine Beetle Management Plan which includes prescribed burns and removal of infected trees to reduce the fire risk and to prevent the beetles from spreading into provincial land.

In 2011, the Royal Astronomical Society of Canada designated Jasper National Park as a dark-sky preserve due to its minimal light pollution and ideal conditions for dark sky viewing.

In 2024, a wildfire destroyed a significant part of the town of Jasper and its surrounding area.

== Wildlife ==
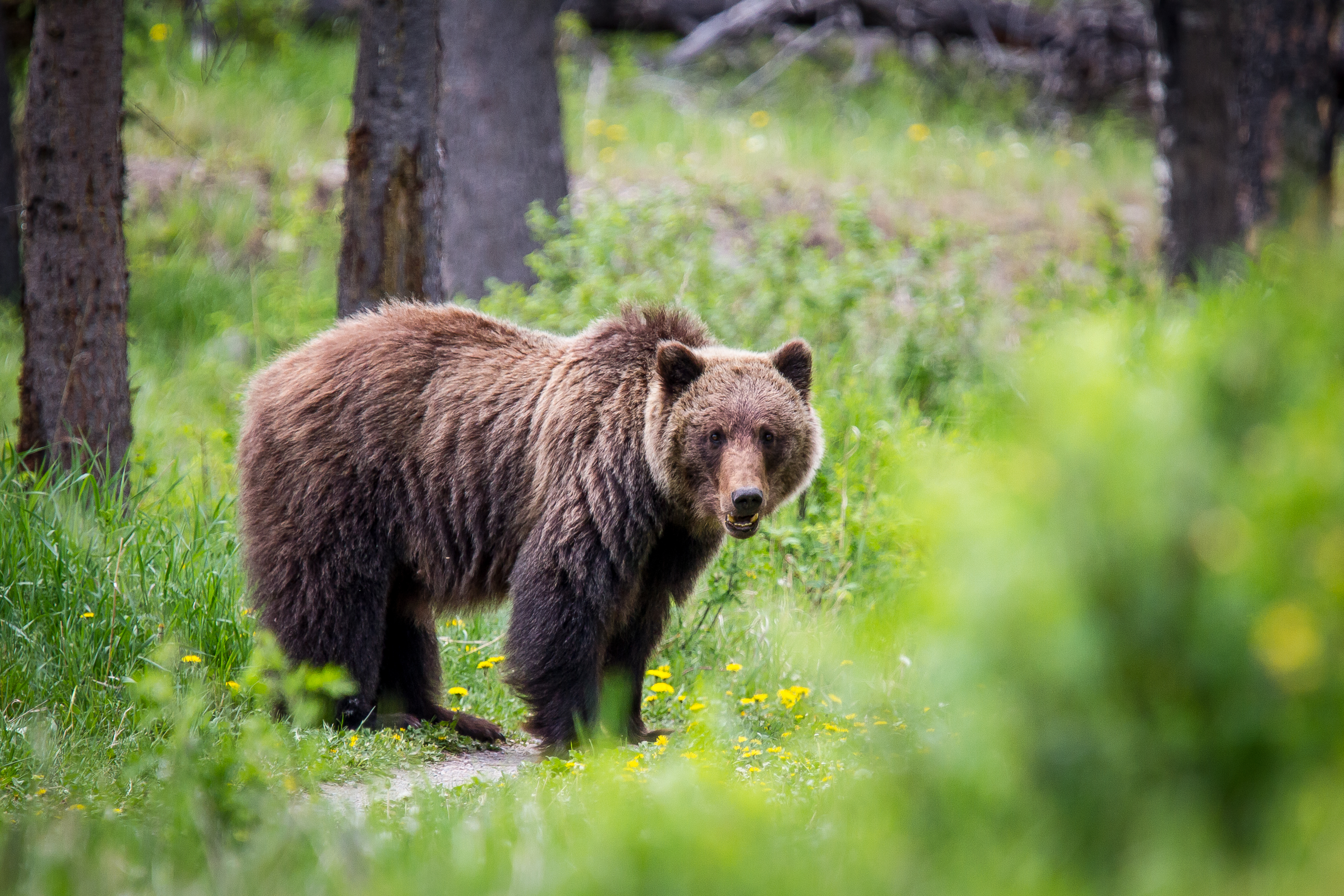
A grizzly bear in a wooded area near Jasper Townsite

There are at least 50 mammal species in the park.

== Geography ==
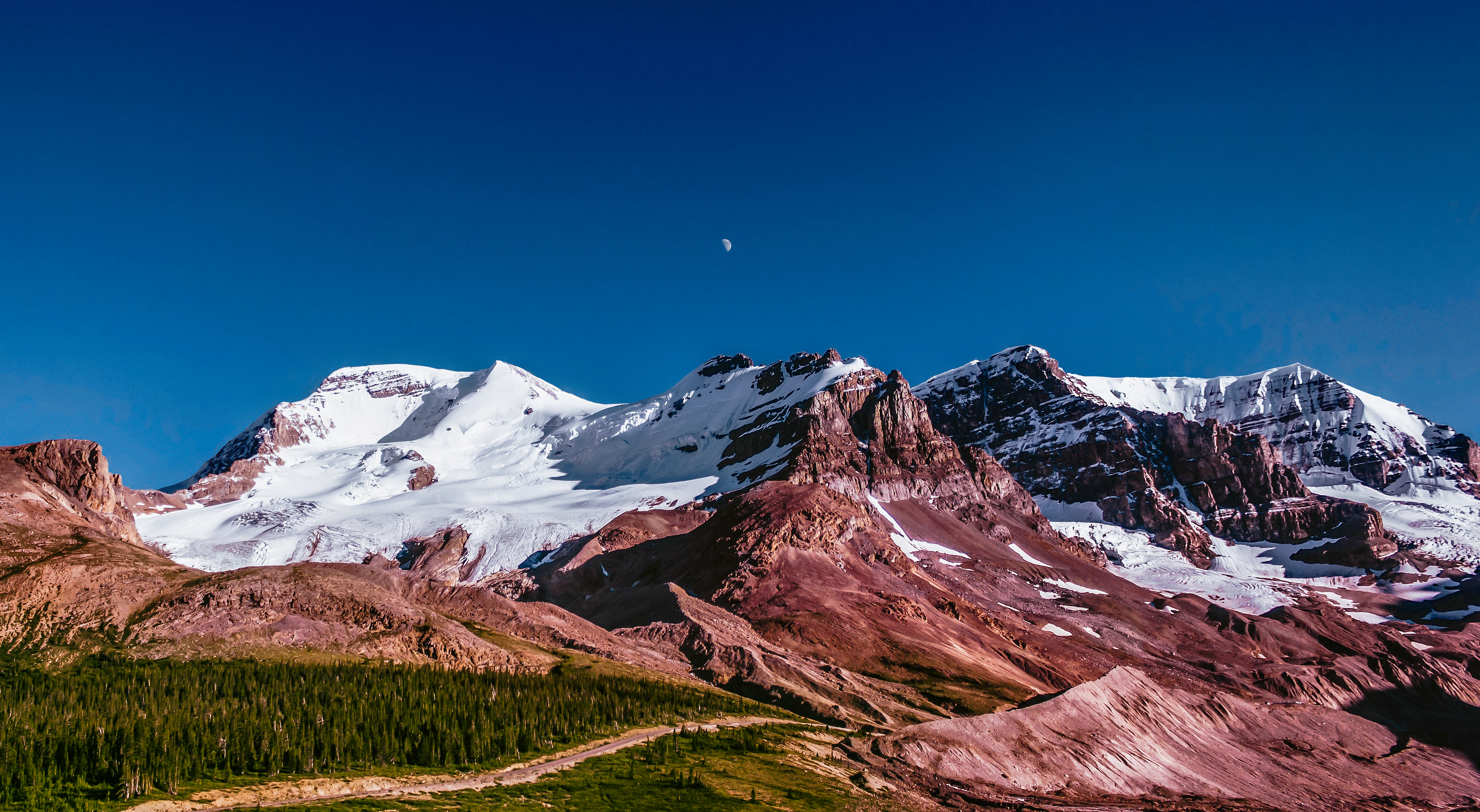
Mount Athabasca in the park

=== Hydrology ===
Most of the park's area forms the headwaters of the Athabasca River, which originates in the park's extreme southernmost point at an unnamed lake unofficially known as Columbia Lake due to it being fed by one of the Columbia Icefield's many outlet glaciers. Despite its misleading name, the well-known Athabasca Glacier is actually the source of the Sunwapta River, a tributary of the Athabasca, not the main river itself. Other major tributaries of the Athabasca River that drain large areas of the park include the Maligne River, the Snake Indian River, Rocky River and the Miette River. The northernmost area of the park is drained separately by the Smoky River. Both the Smoky and Athabasca Rivers form part of the Mackenzie River drainage, the largest river system in Canada, which itself is part of the Arctic Ocean basin. The southeast section of the park is drained by the Brazeau River which is part of the Saskatchewan/Nelson River system which ultimately flows into Hudson Bay.

The park is coextensive with the province of Alberta's Improvement District No. 12.

=== Road network ===
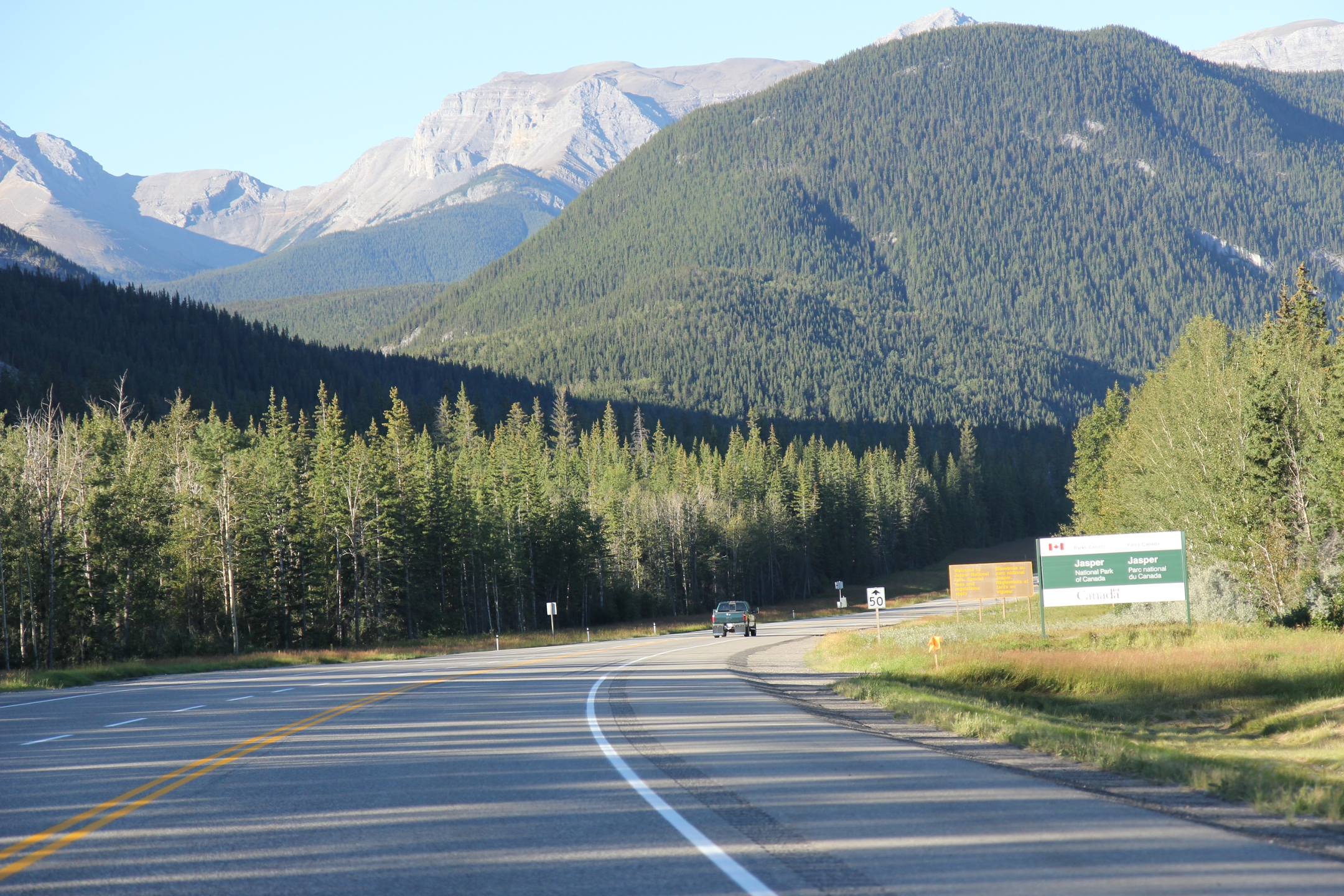
Entering the park on Yellowhead Highway

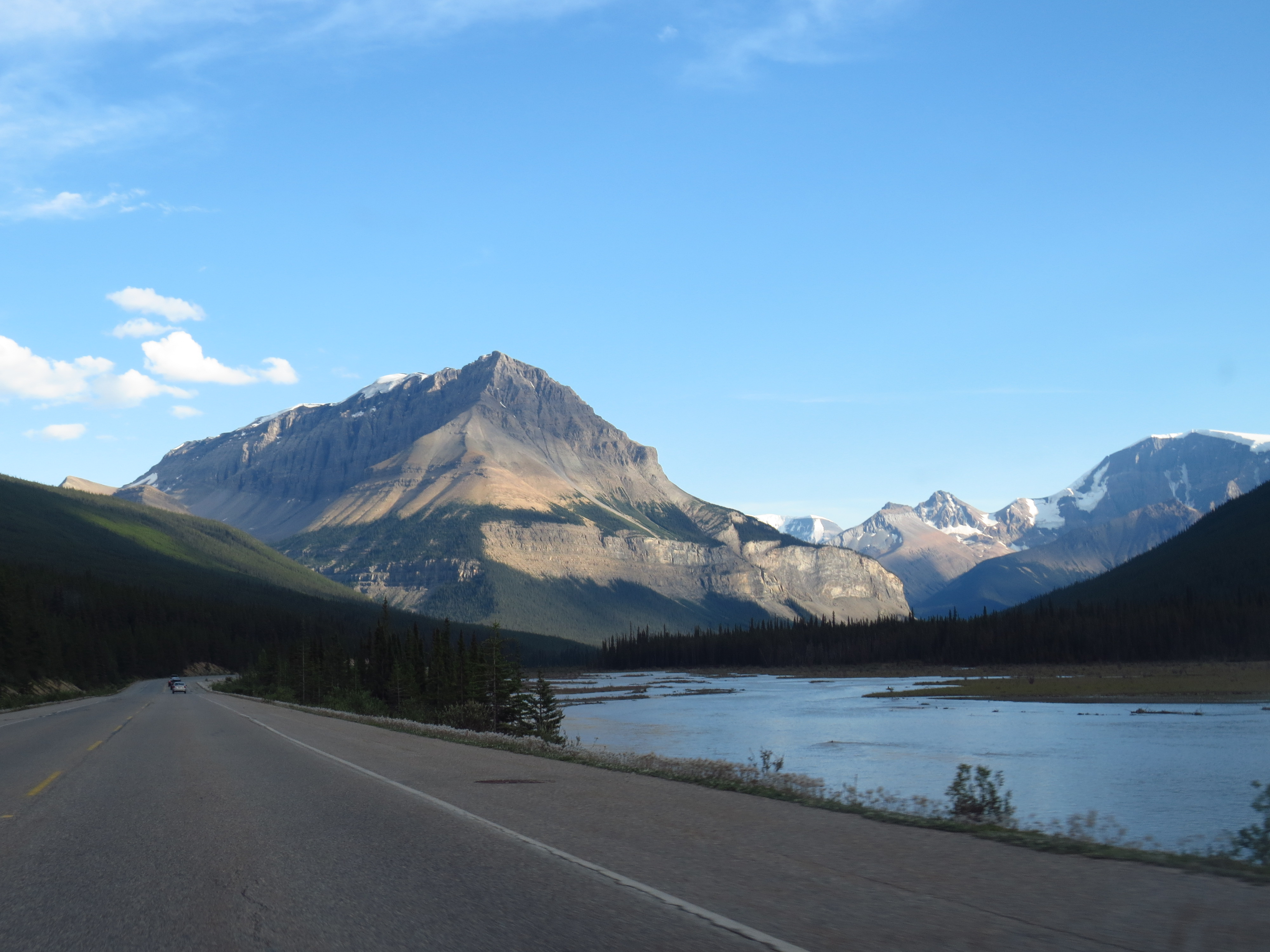
Icefields Parkway, looking southeast at Tangle Ridge above the Sunwapta River.

The park contains several major roads, most of which are intended to be scenic routes that provide access to all of the park's front-country attractions. Since a good sample of the park's scenery and wildlife can be viewed from the roads themselves, driving them is considered a core part of the park experience.

Highway 16 (part of the Trans-Canada Highway and Yellowhead Highway systems) is the main route through the park and is the only major east–west corridor crossing the mountains in that area. It serves as both an important trade and travel corridor for through traffic and a tourist route allowing visitors to access and view many of the park's attractions.

Highway 93, also known as the Icefields Parkway, is a scenic highway 230 km (140 mi) in length running from Lake Louise, Alberta, in Banff National Park, to Jasper, Alberta, where it meets Highway 16. Along its length, the parkway has many viewpoints, tourist attractions, hikes and campgrounds. Unlike Highway 16, the Icefields Parkway is strictly a tourist route, and all freight traffic is prohibited from using the road. All users must have a parks pass.

Alberta Highway 93A is a 24 km (15 mi) parallel road to the Icefields Parkway that provides access to several hikes, campgrounds, and the Marmot Basin Ski Resort. Marmot Basin Road provides access to the Marmot Basin Ski Area and several trailheads from Highway 93A. Edith Cavell Road is a 14 km (8.7 mi) scenic park road that provides access to the Edith Cavell meadow area from the Icefields Parkway. This road is open only between May and October, and RVs are prohibited due to its tight switchback corners.

Maligne Lake Road is a scenic park road that is 44 km (27 mi) in length and runs from Highway 16 near Jasper to Maligne Lake roughly following the course of the Maligne River. It is the park's other major tourist road (besides the Icefields Parkway). It is not as well known as the Icefields Parkway, but provides several viewpoints and access to hiking routes such as the Maligne Canyon trails.

Pyramid Lake Road is a short road that provides tourists access to several lakes and resorts just north of Jasper.

Celestine Lake Road is a long gravel road that runs along the north bank of the Athabasca River, providing access to several remote trailheads.

Miette Hot Springs Road is a 17 km (11 mi) scenic park road that runs from Highway 16 to the Miette Hot Springs, one of the parks core attractions.

== Attractions ==
Most developed attractions in Jasper National Park are located in five car-accessible regions. There is also an extensive network of back country trails with more than 80 campgrounds. Common summer recreational activities in the park include hiking, fishing, mountain biking (in select areas), wildlife viewing, rafting, kayaking and camping. Winter activities include Alpine skiing, cross-country skiing and snowshoeing. Some companies offer dog sled tours in the park.

=== Around town (Three Valley Confluence) ===
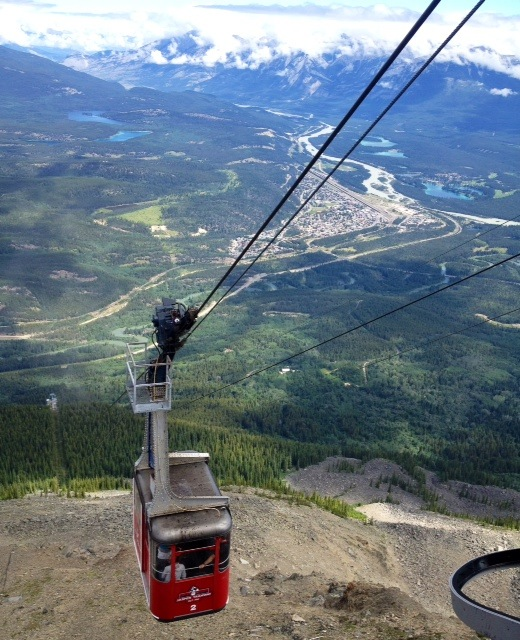
Jasper Skytram, with the town of Jasper in the valley below.

The town of Jasper contains the majority of the services in the park, including the Visitor Information Centre, which is one of the oldest buildings in the park and the former administrative centre and superintendent residence.

To the northwest, above the town, Pyramid Bench has a large trail network with access to Patricia and Pyramid Lakes. There are also commercial operators offering horseback rides, boat rentals, and accommodations.

Jasper Park Lodge is situated east of the town, across the Athabasca River on Lac Beauvert. This was one of the earliest tourist developments in the park, with the main lodge built in 1921. It has amenities such as private cabins, an 18-hole golf course, a spa, and restaurants. In 2024, the Jasper Wildfire damaged some of the property, but most visitor offerings reopened that fall.

South of town, the Jasper Skytram (purchased by Pursuit in 2025) is an aerial tramway running from the valley floor to the shoulder of Whistlers Peak.

=== Maligne Valley ===
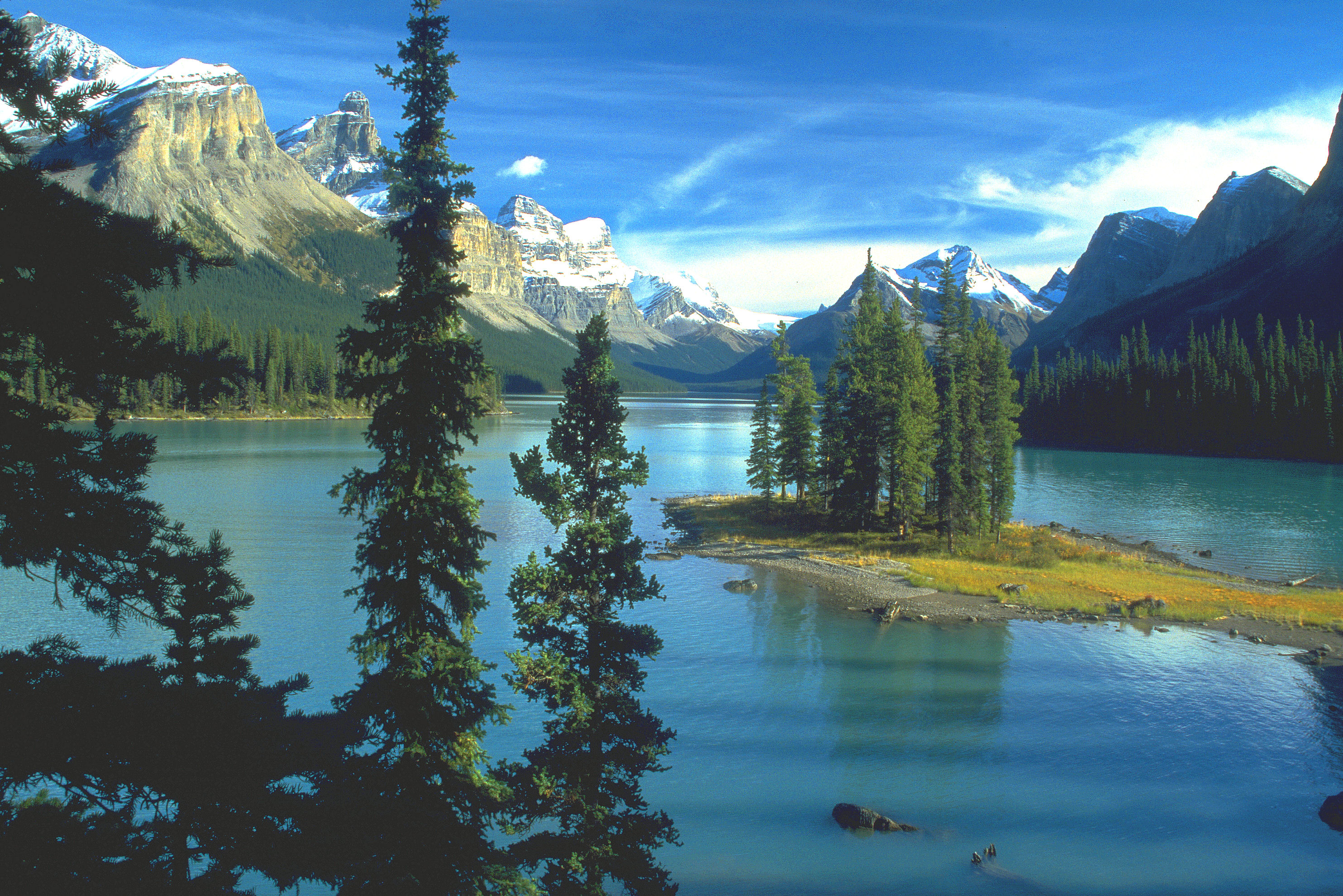
Spirit Island in Maligne Lake

Maligne Canyon, just upstream of the mouth of the Maligne River, is an example of a karst system; slightly acidic surface water dissolved the limestone, forming a slot canyon with waterfalls, potholes, and caves. In places it is 55 metres (180 ft) deep and just a couple metres wide. There is a trail with four bridges over the gorge. During winter, walking along the frozen river at the bottom of the canyon is a popular activity.

Most of the water of the Maligne River reaches the canyon through underground passages from Medicine Lake, 16 kilometres (9.9 mi) further up the valley. Medicine Lake is a losing lake that primarily drains through sinkholes in the lake bottom.

At the head of the valley, Maligne Lake is the longest natural lake in the Canadian Rockies, at 22.3 kilometres (13.9 mi). Maligne Lake Road ends at the northern tip of the lake, from which visitors can continue on foot or by boat to backcountry campgrounds. There are commercial operators that offer boat rentals and tours, including to Spirit Island, a tied island near the lake's midpoint.

=== Jasper East ===
Miette Hot Springs is an aquatic complex featuring warm and cold plunge outdoor pools. The water is sourced from three thermal springs above Sulphur Creek in the Fiddle River valley.

The former site of Jasper House, the namesake of the park, is commemorated by a plaque and viewpoint across the Athabasca River, just off Highway 16. Almost nothing can be seen of the former fur trading post, but it can also be visited on foot from Celestine Road.

=== Highway 93A ===
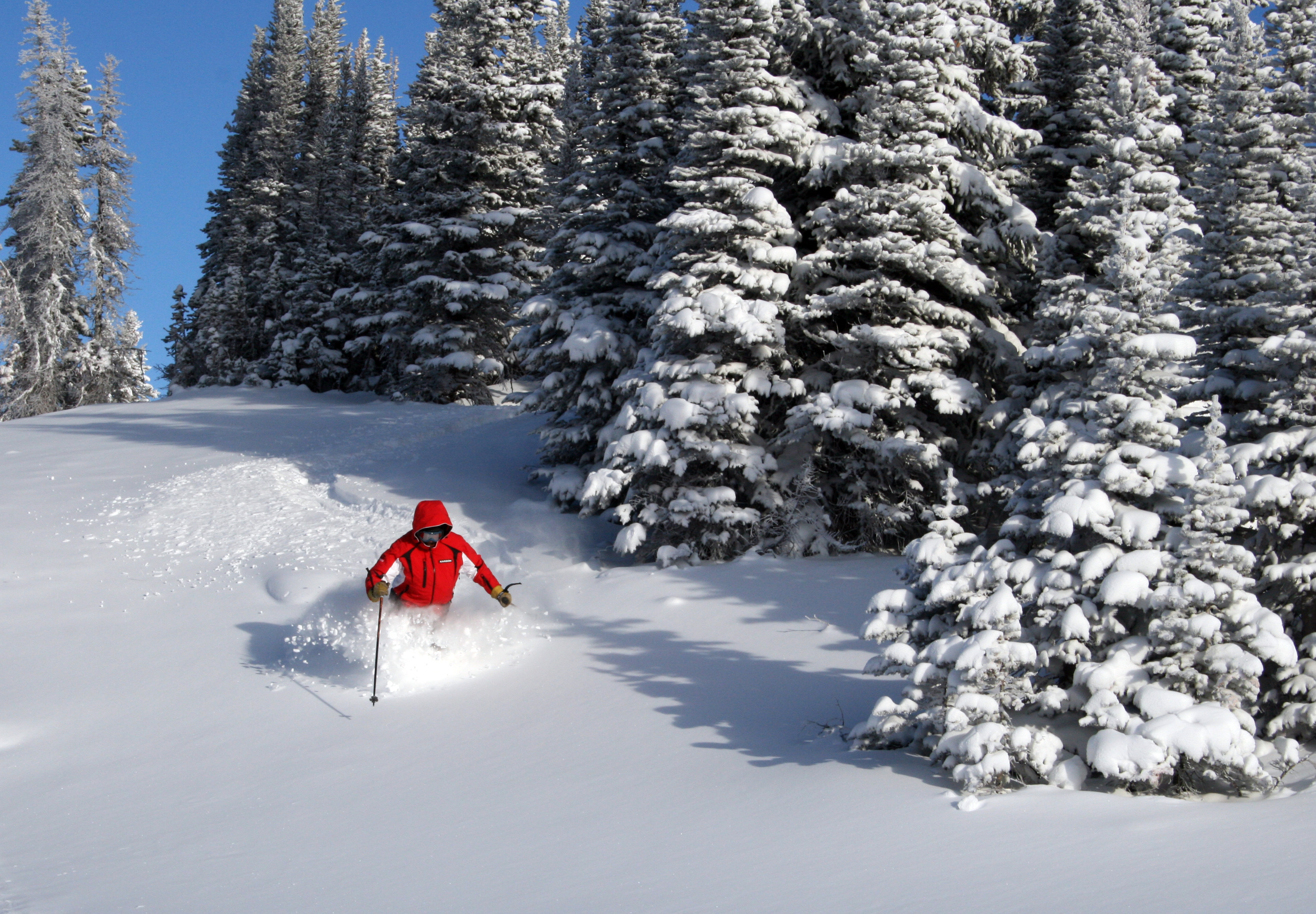
A skier at Marmot Basin

Also called the Wabasso Road, Highway 93A was the original Banff-Jasper Highway and runs west of the Athabasca River. It provides access to several popular areas southwest of the town of Jasper.

Mount Edith Cavell is visited by tens of thousands of sightseers from June through October. Visitors gain a viewpoint of the Angel Glacier and can hike in the Cavell Meadows, famous for its wildflowers in July.

Marmot Basin ski area has steadily opened new runs, lifts, and facilities since 1964. In 2023, Marmot opened a new chair lift to 2,518 metres (8,261 ft), giving easier access to a cirque just below Marmot Peak. In 2025, the area has 7 lifts, 91 runs with a vertical drop of 914 metres (2,999 ft). A major part of Jasper's winter economy, it was aiming for 200,000 visitors in the 2024–2025 season, in line with historical numbers.

At the south end of the road, near its junction with Highway 93, there is a parking lot with access to Athabasca Falls. The falls are 23 metres (75 ft) tall. The powerful, high volume of water pouring over a ledge of hard quartzite is continually deepening the falls by eroding the softer limestone below.

=== Icefields Parkway (Highway 93) ===
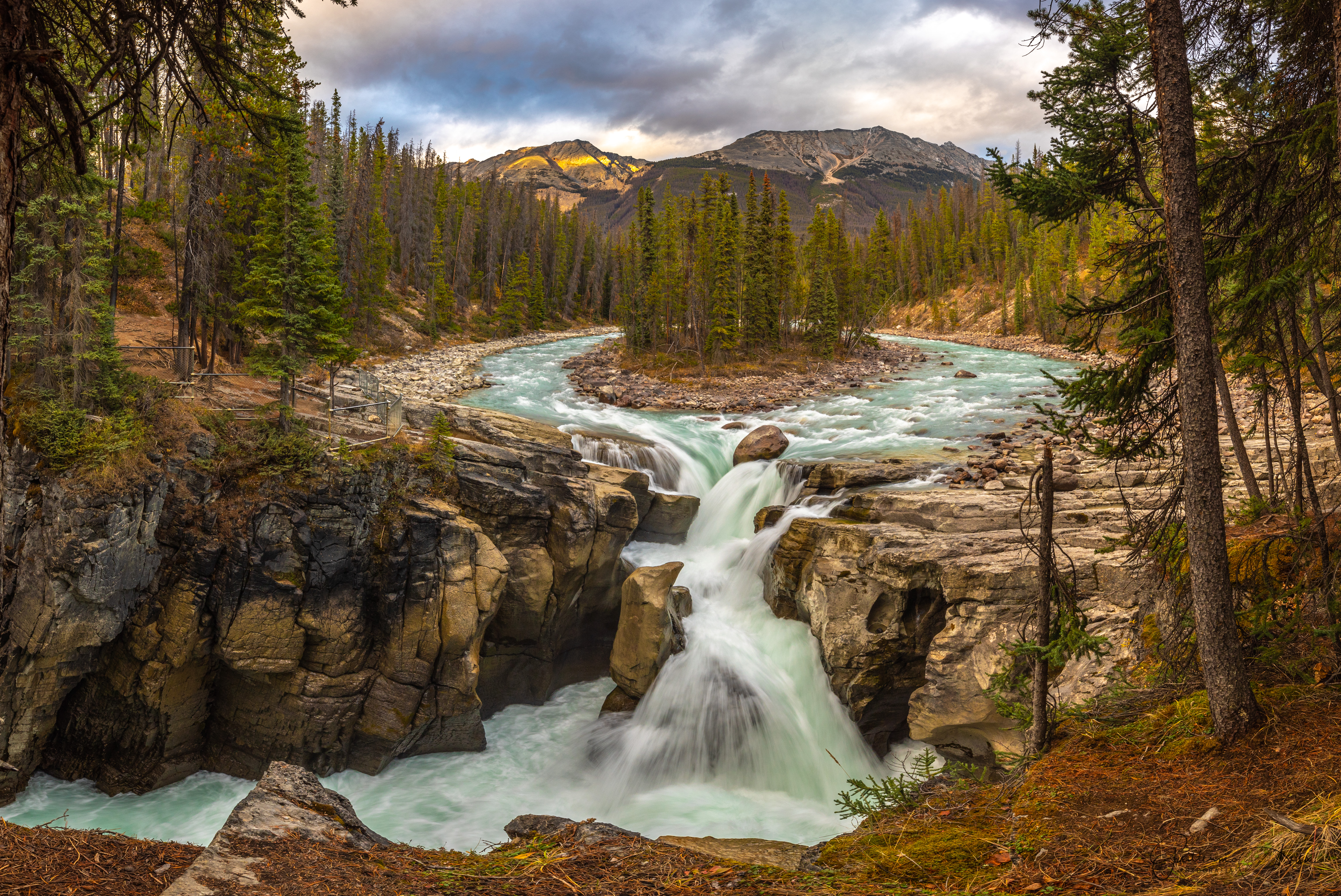
Upper Sunwapta Falls, Jasper National Park

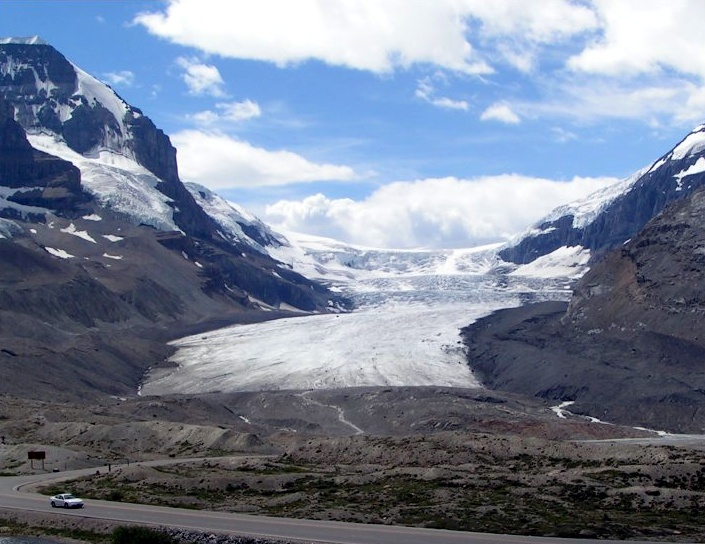
Athabasca Glacier and the rim of the Columbia Icefield with the Icefields Parkway in the foreground.

In Jasper National Park, the Icefields Parkway runs parallel to the continental divide on the east side of the Athabasca and Sunwapta rivers until Sunwapta Pass, where it continues through Banff National Park. In addition to providing motor and cycle access to the heart of the Canadian Rockies, the road itself is considered one of the park's main attractions.

A pullout provides an interpretive bronze plaque and a viewpoint towards Athabasca Pass, which was made a National Historic Site of Canada in 1971 for its importance to the fur trade.

Sunwapta Falls is a short distance from the highway, just upstream from where the Sunwapta enters the Athabasca River. It is formed by the difference in elevation between the hanging valley and the larger and deeper Athabasca valley.

Commercial operator Brewster Travel Canada, now owned by Pursuit, began construction of a glass-bottomed walkway in 2013 over opposition from the public and environmental groups. In May 2014, tickets to the $21 million Glacier Sky Walk opened for purchase. The platform is 280 metres (920 ft) above the Sunwapta valley floor.

The Athabasca Glacier is a toe of the Columbia Icefield near the border with Banff National Park. It extends to within a few kilometres of the parkway, making it one of the most accessible and visited glaciers in the world. It has been receding since at least the 19th century. A 1.8-kilometre (1.1 mi) interpretive hiking trail leads visitors right up to the glacier with markers showing the past extent of the glacier. Visitors can hire guides to take them up the ice on foot, and Pursuit sells tickets for tours in specialized vehicles that drive on the glacier: the 56-passenger Ice Explorer and 10-passenger Ice Odyssey all-terrain vehicles.

On July 18, 2020, an Ice Explorer bus with 27 passengers lost control and tumbled 50 metres (160 ft) down a steep moraine. 3 died on scene and 14 had life-threatening head and pelvis injuries. In 2021, while an RCMP-led investigation was still underway, Pursuit resumed the tour having added seat belts to the vehicles. The company pleaded guilty to two of the eight charges under the Occupational Health and Safety Act and paid $475,000 in fines. Victims have also filed civil lawsuits, and a fatality inquiry is set for 2025.

=== Backcountry ===
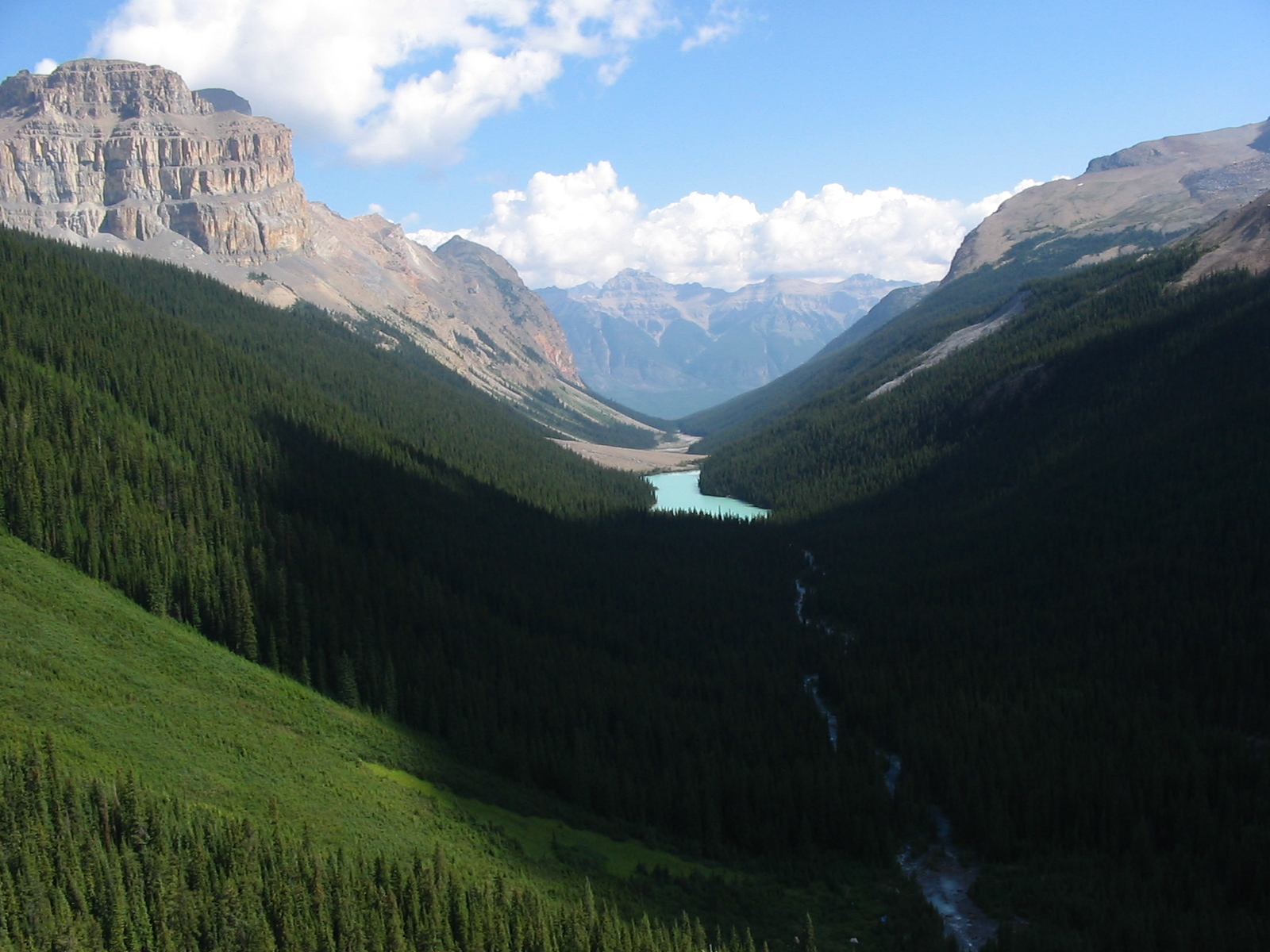
Fryatt Valley from the top of the head wall

Only a small fraction of Jasper National Park is road-accessible; as of April 2022, over 97% of the park is zoned as wilderness. Since 1978, there have been between 13,000 and 34,000 back country users per year, less than 1% of all visitors to Jasper National Park. Although there are 1,100 kilometres (680 mi) of trails throughout the park, many areas remain undeveloped and do not have access trails.

Existing trails receive varying levels of maintenance, with the most popular areas, including the Tonquin Valley, Skyline Trail, Maligne Lake, and Brazeau, designated as a high priority for immediate repairs. Low priorities, such as Athabasca Pass, the North Boundary Trail, and the South Boundary Trail, may not be cleared regularly, and lost bridges may not be replaced.

Backcountry Trips Recommended by Jasper National Park
Trail	Maintenance Priority	Recommended Duration	Distance (Note: One-way unless otherwise specified)	Accommodations
Chaba: Big Bend & Athabasca Crossing	High	2–3 days	14.8 km (9.2 mi)	2 campgrounds
Maligne Lake (Note: Boat access only)	High	2+ days	21.3 km (13.2 mi)	3 campgrounds, 4 picnic areas
Fryatt	High	2–3 days	22 km (14 mi)	2 campgrounds, 1 ACC hut
Tonquin Valley	High	2–3 days	43.1 km (26.8 mi)	7 campgrounds, 1 ACC hut
Skyline	High	2–3 days	44.1 km (27.4 mi)	6 campgrounds, 1 backcountry lodge
The Brazeau Loop	High	5 days	81 km (50 mi) loop	6 campgrounds
Athabasca Island	Medium	2 days	7.5 km (4.7 mi)	1 campground
Saturday Night Lake	Medium	2–3 days	24.6 km (15.3 mi)	2 campgrounds
Celestine Lake to Rock Lake	Medium	3–4 days	52.8 km (32.8 mi)	5 campgrounds
Geraldine Lakes	Low	1–2 days	6.2 km (3.9 mi)	1 campground
Jacques Lake	Low	1–2 days	12.2 km (7.6 mi)	1 campground, 1 ACC hut (winter only)
Fiddle River	Low	2–3 days	37.8 km (23.5 mi)	3 campgrounds, 1 Alberta Parks campground
Maligne Pass	Low	2–3 days	48 km (30 mi)	4 campgrounds
Athabasca Pass	Low	4–5 days	48.5 km (30.1 mi)	6 campgrounds
Jonas Pass - Poboktan Creek	Low	3–4 days	54 km (34 mi)	5 campgrounds
Little Heaven - Upper Blue Creek	Low	7–10 days	64 km (40 mi)	6 campgrounds
South Boundary	Low	7–10 days	121 km (75 mi)	11 campgrounds
North Boundary	Low	7–10 days	159 km (99 mi)	11 campgrounds, 7 BC Parks campgrounds

== Climate ==
Climate data for Jasper, Alberta (1991–2020 normals, extremes 1926–present)
Month	Jan	Feb	Mar	Apr	May	Jun	Jul	Aug	Sep	Oct	Nov	Dec	Year
Record high humidex	10.7	15.9	20.5	26.1	30.0	40.2	38.3	36.8	32.1	26.1	19.6	12.3	40.2
Record high °C (°F)	13.3 (55.9)	16.5 (61.7)	20.8 (69.4)	26.5 (79.7)	30.4 (86.7)	41.2 (106.2)	39.4 (102.9)	35.0 (95.0)	32.8 (91.0)	27.2 (81.0)	19.9 (67.8)	15.0 (59.0)	41.2 (106.2)
Mean daily maximum °C (°F)	−3.2 (26.2)	0.5 (32.9)	4.7 (40.5)	10.9 (51.6)	16.4 (61.5)	20.0 (68.0)	23.4 (74.1)	23.0 (73.4)	17.9 (64.2)	9.9 (49.8)	1.5 (34.7)	−3.5 (25.7)	10.1 (50.2)
Daily mean °C (°F)	−8.8 (16.2)	−6.1 (21.0)	−1.8 (28.8)	3.7 (38.7)	8.7 (47.7)	12.6 (54.7)	15.4 (59.7)	14.6 (58.3)	10.2 (50.4)	3.9 (39.0)	−3.3 (26.1)	−8.8 (16.2)	3.4 (38.1)
Mean daily minimum °C (°F)	−14.4 (6.1)	−12.7 (9.1)	−8.2 (17.2)	−3.6 (25.5)	0.9 (33.6)	5.2 (41.4)	7.4 (45.3)	6.1 (43.0)	2.5 (36.5)	−2.4 (27.7)	−8.1 (17.4)	−14.1 (6.6)	−3.4 (25.8)
Record low °C (°F)	−46.7 (−52.1)	−43.3 (−45.9)	−36.7 (−34.1)	−28.9 (−20.0)	−15.8 (3.6)	−6.7 (19.9)	−3.4 (25.9)	−3.0 (26.6)	−11.1 (12.0)	−28.7 (−19.7)	−38.8 (−37.8)	−42.2 (−44.0)	−46.7 (−52.1)
Record low wind chill	−53.6	−50.5	−43.8	−30.2	−14.1	−6.3	−5.3	−4.8	−15.6	−34.4	−51.6	−51.1	−53.6
Average precipitation mm (inches)	20.2 (0.80)	15.2 (0.60)	19.6 (0.77)	19.6 (0.77)	36.5 (1.44)	57.6 (2.27)	52.2 (2.06)	50.8 (2.00)	36.2 (1.43)	26.0 (1.02)	24.4 (0.96)	17.9 (0.70)	376.2 (14.82)
Average rainfall mm (inches)	2.0 (0.08)	2.4 (0.09)	3.8 (0.15)	11.9 (0.47)	32.5 (1.28)	52.7 (2.07)	51.5 (2.03)	58.8 (2.31)	32.7 (1.29)	20.2 (0.80)	5.5 (0.22)	2.9 (0.11)	276.9 (10.9)
Average snowfall cm (inches)	21.2 (8.3)	11.8 (4.6)	17.0 (6.7)	7.9 (3.1)	4.7 (1.9)	0.0 (0.0)	0.0 (0.0)	0.0 (0.0)	2.1 (0.8)	8.3 (3.3)	20.8 (8.2)	17.9 (7.0)	111.7 (43.9)
Average precipitation days (≥ 0.2 mm)	11.2	9.2	10.4	9.3	12.5	14.7	15.3	14.4	12.9	12.0	11.7	11.0	144.6
Average rainy days (≥ 0.2 mm)	0.76	1.3	2.6	6.1	11.6	14.4	14.1	14.1	11.5	8.0	2.6	1.3	88.4
Average snowy days (≥ 0.2 cm)	10.1	6.2	8.1	3.3	2.3	0.0	0.0	0.0	0.41	3.6	8.9	8.0	50.9
Average relative humidity (%) (at 15:00 LST)	63.1	47.6	42.1	35.5	36.7	40.5	39.2	39.1	42.5	49.6	62.0	66.3	47.0
Source: Environment Canada

== General management ==
Jasper National Park is managed by Parks Canada under the National Parks Act. On a provincial level, the park area outside of the Municipality of Jasper is administered by Alberta Municipal Affairs as Improvement District No. 12 (Jasper National Park). The Municipality of Jasper was formed by the Government of Alberta in 2001 and has its own local government.

== In popular culture ==
Jasper National Park is featured in the 2010 3D animated comedy-drama film Alpha and Omega as the location the two wolf protagonists are taken from and struggle to return to.

A KLM Boeing 777-300 is named after Jasper National Park.

== See also ==
- Dark-sky preserve
- Ecology of the Rocky Mountains
- Jasper Palisade
- List of national parks of Canada
- List of historic places in Alberta's Rockies
- List of trails in Alberta
- List of mountains of Alberta
- List of waterfalls of Alberta
- Wildlife of Canada
- SS Jasper Park
