= 2024 Western megafires =

The Jasper wildfire is one of three record-breaking megafires in North America—along with the 2024 California wildfires and the 2024 Oregon wildfires — where blazes intensified at an alarming rate. According to a July 2024 Inside Climate News, these three wildfires in Western North America are fueled by climate change, creating a "unique...cocktail of conditions". Concerns have been raised about the potential for megafires—also referred to as mega-fires and mega fires—by firefighters since at least 2018, raising questions about wildfire management.

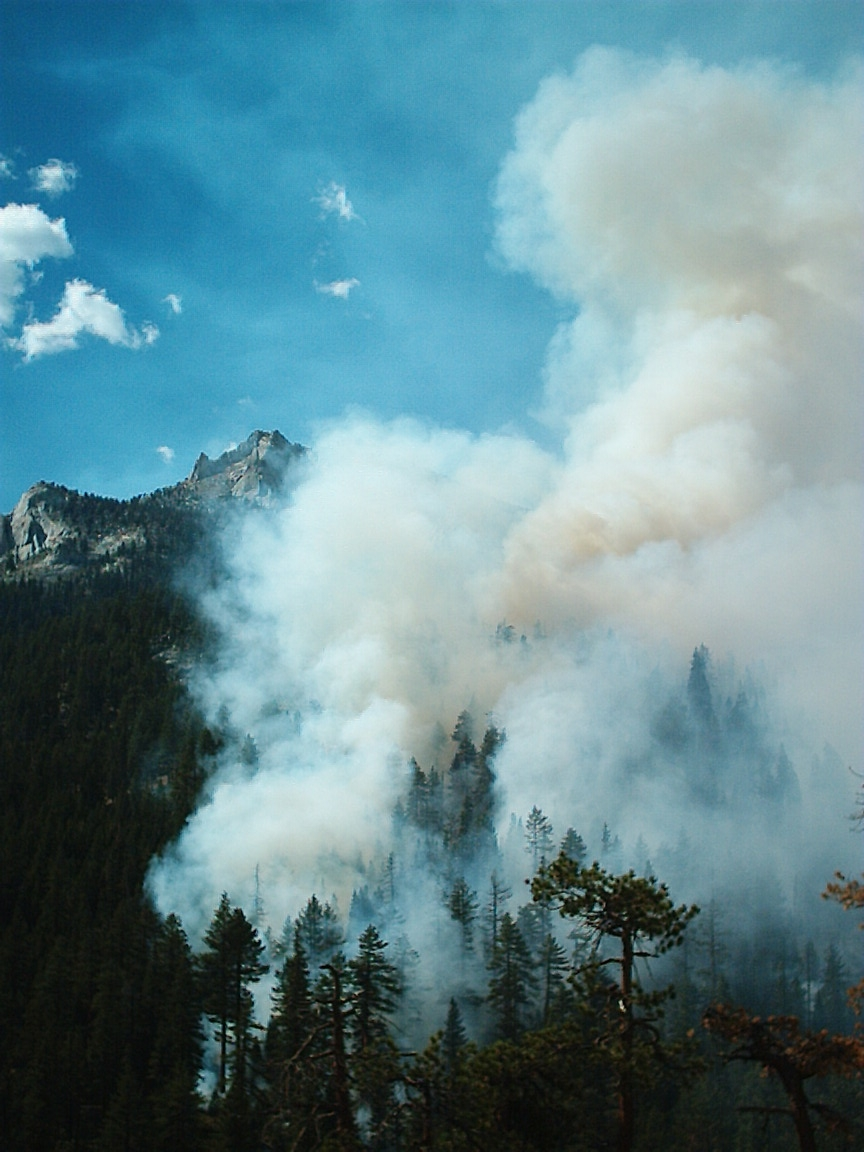

== Background of the disaster ==
The Western Megafires of 2024 refers to a collective of large scale wildfires spanning from Western Canada to the Southwestern United States (US) during the aforementioned calendar year. While universally undefined at present, the term ‘Megafire’ has historically been used to describe fires of an increasingly unprecedented size and destructive nature. With one recently proposed and conservative definition, being those fires of >10,000 ha in size, encompassing single, or multiple yet related ignition events. Using even this conservative definition, many of the 2024 wildfires in the west may still be classified as megafires. Several of the most remarkable, by way of overall destruction, loss of life, or otherwise unique devastation include:

=== Jasper Wildfire (Jasper, Alberta, Canada) – July 22, 2024 ===
Following a night of lightning strikes and fueled by strong winds, the Jasper Wildfire quickly grew to an estimated 32,722 ha in size. Quickly prompting the total evacuation of the city of Jasper (pop. 4,817 (2023)). During its subsequent progression, approximately 30% of the total structures of the town were destroyed, and one death of a firefighter was recorded while fighting the blaze. To help rebuild, the government of Alberta has approved initial disaster recovery funding of 149 million CAD.

=== Park Fire (Butte & Tehama, California) – July 24, 2024 ===
The largest of 7,473 California wildland fires in 2024, and a cumulative 173,854 ha burned across multiple counties. With arson credited as the initial precipitant, the blaze went on to destroy 709 structures, and rank as the fourth largest wildfire in US history. Fire suppression costs alone are estimated at US$310 million. The total financial toll being, as of yet, unquantified.

=== Durkee Fire (Baker & Malheur, Oregon) – July 17, 2024 ===
Amidst the largest wildfire season in the state's history emerged the Durkee Wildfire. Ignited by a lightning strike, the Durkee fire ravaged an estimated 119,084 ha before eventual containment. The fire destroyed two buildings, but remained largely restricted to less densely populated areas. However, extensive smoke produced by the blaze prompted the American Lung Association to release public service announcements warning of “extreme harm” due to air quality in the region.

A recently published analysis of over 60,000 wildfires from 2001 to 2020 in the continuous US revealed that average peak daily growth rates of fires has more than doubled in the Western US over the past two decades. This data suggests that moving forward, larger and more aggressive wildfires, including mega-fires, will become ever more the norm. Leading US experts in environmental research advise this increase is driven by climate change, and has led to concern over implications for public health, socioeconomics, and environmental protections. Specifically, the defense of ecosystems, health and social stability, and air quality.
