= Lac Beauvert =

Lake in Alberta, Canada

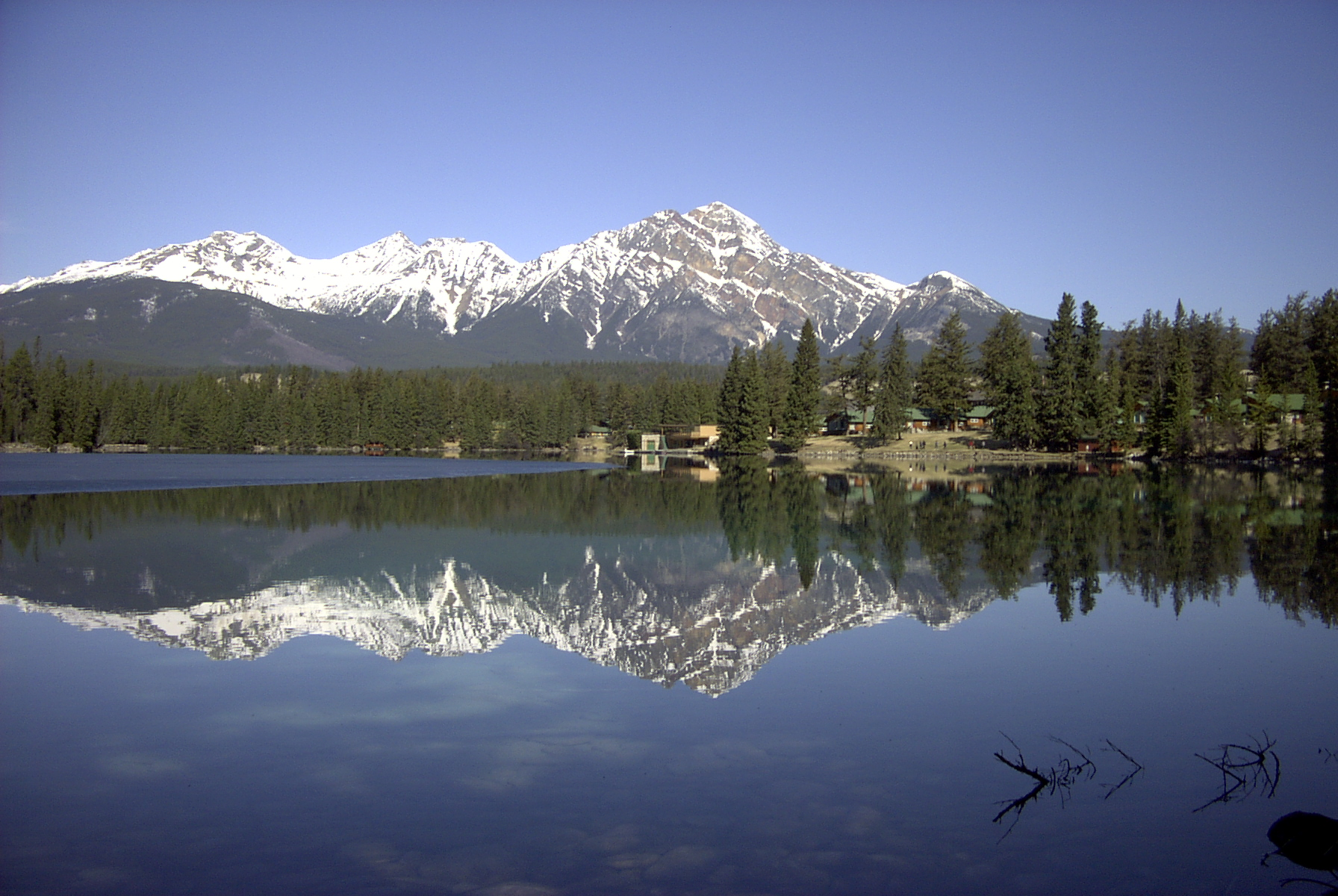
- With the Jasper Park Lodge on the north shore

- Location within Alberta
- Location: Jasper National Park, Alberta
- Coordinates: 52°52′56″N 118°03′39″W
- Primary outflows: Athabasca River
- Basin countries: Canada
- Max. length: 900 m (3,000 ft)
- Max. width: 750 m (2,460 ft)
- Surface area: 0.4 km^{2} (0.15 sq mi)
- Surface elevation: 1,040 m (3,410 ft)
- Settlements: Jasper

Lac Beauvert, or Beauvert Lake (/boʊˈvɛər/) is a small lake (0.4 km^{2}) in Jasper National Park, Alberta, Canada.

It is next to the Jasper Park Lodge, a Fairmont Hotels and Resorts property. The lake is 3 kilometres northeast of the town of Jasper. Lac Beauvert is a remanent of what was once a much larger lake that covered the entire Jasper valley, also encompassing the modern day nearby lakes of Patricia Lake, Pyramid Lake, Lake Edith and Lake Annette.
