= List of provincial parks in Alberta =

This is a list of provincial parks in Alberta, Canada. They are maintained by Alberta Parks.

== Provincial parks ==
Provincial parks are established under the Provincial Parks Act to "support outdoor recreation, heritage tourism and natural heritage appreciation activities that depend on and are compatible with the natural environment". Provincial parks differ from wildland provincial parks in that the former have better road access and allow a greater range of activities for users. Provincial parks have a focus on a variety of outdoor recreational uses and enjoyment of the natural environment.

Name	Sub-region	Established	Image	Coordinates
Antelope Hill Provincial Park	Special Area No. 2	2014-12-04		51°43′31″N 111°55′48″W
Aspen Beach Provincial Park	Lacombe County	1932-11-21		52°27′44″N 113°58′36″W
Beauvais Lake Provincial Park	Pincher Creek No. 9	1954-02-01		49°24′51″N 114°6′54″W
Big Hill Springs Provincial Park	Rocky View County	1957		51°15′6″N 114°23′13″W
Big Island Provincial Park	Edmonton	2023		53°26′26″N 113°38′45″W
Big Knife Provincial Park	County of Paintearth No. 18	1962-10-02		52°29′23″N 112°12′38″W
Bow Valley Provincial Park	Kananaskis Improvement District; Municipal District of Bighorn No. 8	1959-07-27		51°4′19″N 115°4′31″W
Bragg Creek Provincial Park	Rocky View County	1960-01-19		50°56′21″N 114°35′0″W
Brown-Lowery Provincial Park	Foothills No. 31	1992-10-29		50°48′50″N 114°25′50″W
Calling Lake Provincial Park	Municipal District of Opportunity No. 17	1991		55°10′47″N 113°16′21″W
Canmore Nordic Centre Provincial Park	Kananaskis Improvement District	1998-12-09		51°5′33″N 115°23′24″W
Carson-Pegasus Provincial Park	Woodlands County	1982-05-19		54°18′8″N 115°38′24″W
Castle Provincial Park	Pincher Creek No. 9	2017-01-20		49°25′53″N 114°23′36″W
Chain Lakes Provincial Park	Ranchland No. 66	1969-12-23		50°12′0″N 114°11′0″W
Cold Lake Provincial Park	Bonnyville No. 87	1976-08-18		54°28′0″N 110°7′0″W
Crimson Lake Provincial Park	Clearwater County	1955-11-22		52°27′57″N 115°2′44″W
Cross Lake Provincial Park	Lesser Slave River No. 124	1955-11-22		54°39′11″N 113°47′40″W
Crow Lake Provincial Park	Lac La Biche County	2000-11-04		55°47′57″N 112°8′45″W
Cypress Hills Provincial Park	Cypress County	1951		49°38′0″N 110°12′30″W
Dillberry Lake Provincial Park	Wainwright No. 61	1957-01-08		52°34′0″N 110°2′0″W
Dinosaur Provincial Park	County of Newell; Special Area No. 2	1955		50°47′0″N 111°30′0″W
Dry Island Buffalo Jump Provincial Park	Kneehill County; Starland County; County of Stettler No. 6	1970-12-15		51°56′38″N 112°57′49″W
Dunvegan Provincial Park	Fairview No. 136	1992-07-11		55°55′25″N 118°35′40″W
Eagle Point Provincial Park	Brazeau County	2007-08-29		53°15′8″N 114°51′57″W
Fish Creek Provincial Park	Calgary	1975-06-10		50°55′18″N 114°3′30″W
Garner Lake Provincial Park	Smoky Lake County			54°10′57″N 111°44′41″W
Glenbow Ranch Provincial Park	Rocky View County			51°9′42″N 114°21′40″W
Gooseberry Lake Provincial Park	Special Area No. 4	1966		52°7′1″N 110°45′33″W
Greene Valley Provincial Park	Northern Sunrise County	2000-06-06		56°8′17″N 117°13′23″W
Gregoire Lake Provincial Park	Regional Municipality of Wood Buffalo			56°29′6″N 111°10′58″W
Hilliard's Bay Provincial Park	Big Lakes County			55°30′13″N 115°58′46″W
Jarvis Bay Provincial Park	Lacombe County	1965-07-08		52°20′43″N 114°5′11″W
Kinbrook Island Provincial Park	County of Newell			50°26′4″N 111°56′30″W
Lakeland Provincial Park and Recreation Area	Lac La Biche County			54°45′10″N 111°32′50″W
Lesser Slave Lake Provincial Park	Lesser Slave River No. 124			55°24′44″N 114°48′49″W
Little Bow Provincial Park	Vulcan County			50°13′49″N 112°55′47″W
Little Fish Lake Provincial Park	Special Area No. 2			51°22′22″N 112°11′47″W
Lois Hole Centennial Provincial Park	Sturgeon County	2005-04-19		53°35′44″N 113°43′51″W
Long Lake Provincial Park	Thorhild County	1957-03-25		54.4430556°N 112.7711111°W
Midland Provincial Park	Drumheller; Starland County	1979-06-05		51°28′41″N 112°46′20″W
Miquelon Lake Provincial Park	Camrose County	1958-05-20		53°15′3″N 112°52′52″W
Moonshine Lake Provincial Park	Saddle Hills County	1959-04-09		55.8797223°N 119.2155556°W
Moose Lake Provincial Park	Bonnyville No. 87	1967-04-19		54°16′17″N 110°55′48″W
Notikewin Provincial Park	County of Northern Lights	1979-11-20		57.2205555°N 117.1402778°W
O'Brien Provincial Park	Greenview No. 16			55.0661111°N 118.8213889°W
Obed Lake Provincial Park	Yellowhead County	2000-12-20		53°33′47″N 117°5′32″W
Park Lake Provincial Park	Lethbridge County			49°48′46″N 112°55′12″W
Pembina River Provincial Park	Yellowhead County	1953		53°36′28″N 114°59′50″W
Peter Lougheed Provincial Park	Kananaskis Improvement District	1977		50°41′58″N 115°11′16″W
Pierre Grey's Lakes Provincial Park	Greenview No. 16			53°54′11″N 118°35′25″W
Pigeon Lake Provincial Park	County of Wetaskiwin No. 10	1962		53.0352777°N 114.1611111°W
Police Outpost Provincial Park	Cardston County	1970-04-21		49°0′22″N 113°27′44″W
Queen Elizabeth Provincial Park	Peace No. 135			56.218611°N 117.6938889°W
Ram Falls Provincial Park	Clearwater County			52.0969444°N 115.8391667°W
Red Lodge Provincial Park	Red Deer County			51.9444445°N 114.2441667°W
Rochon Sands Provincial Park	County of Stettler No. 6			52.4608333°N 112.8875°W
Rock Lake Provincial Park	Yellowhead County			53°28′59″N 118°13′35″W
Saskatoon Island Provincial Park	Grande Prairie County No. 1	1973		55.2038889°N 119.0855556°W
Sheep River Provincial Park	Kananaskis Improvement District	2001-07-24		50.6519444°N 114.6241666°W
Sir Winston Churchill Provincial Park	Lac La Biche County	2010		54.8319445°N 111.9727778°W
Spray Valley Provincial Park	Kananaskis Improvement District	2000-09-20		50.8938888°N 115.285°W
Strathcona Science Provincial Park	Strathcona County	1979		53.5608°N 113.384°W
Sundance Provincial Park	Yellowhead County	1999-04-28		53°40′13″N 116°52′1″W
Thunder Lake Provincial Park	County of Barrhead No. 11	1958-01-28		54°7′47″N 114°43′41″W
Tillebrook Provincial Park	County of Newell	1965-07-20		50°32′13″N 111°48′52″W
Two Lakes Provincial Park	Greenview No. 16	1952		54°22′0″N 119°46′2″W
Vermilion Provincial Park	County of Vermilion River	1953-05-29		53°22′7″N 110°54′34″W
Wabamun Lake Provincial Park	Parkland County	1993		53°33′46″N 114°29′9″W
Whitney Lakes Provincial Park	County of St. Paul No. 19	1982-06-23		53°51′0″N 110°32′0″W
William A. Switzer Provincial Park	Yellowhead County	1958-12-22		53°30′0″N 117°48′0″W
Williamson Provincial Park	Greenview No. 16	1971-08-03		55°4′57″N 117°33′35″W
Willow Creek Provincial Park	Willow Creek No. 26	1957-12-10		50°7′2″N 113°46′9″W
Winagami Lake Provincial Park	Smoky River No. 130	2000-11-15		55°38′36″N 116°40′47″W
Woolford Provincial Park	Cardston County	1967		49.1780556°N 113.1911111°W
Writing-on-Stone Provincial Park	Warner County No. 5	2011		49.0833334°N 111.6333333°W
Wyndham-Carseland Provincial Park	Wheatland County; Vulcan County	1979		50.8316667°N 113.4297222°W
Young's Point Provincial Park	Greenview No. 16	1998-08-26		55.1436111°N 117.5672222°W

== Wildland parks ==
Wildland provincial parks are established under the Provincial Parks Act to "preserve and protect natural heritage and provide opportunities for backcountry recreation". "Wildland provincial parks are large, undeveloped natural landscapes that retain their primeval character." Wildland parks are more remote and offer more difficult access than provincial parks. In addition, recreational activities are more limited to minimize visitor impacts on the natural environment.

Name	Sub-region	Established	Image	Coordinates
Birch Mountains Wildland Provincial Park	Regional Municipality of Wood Buffalo	2000-12-20		57°30′N 113°0′W
Birch River Wildland Provincial Park	Regional Municipality of Wood Buffalo	2018-05-14		57°49′N 113°28′W
Bluerock Wildland Provincial Park	Kananaskis Improvement District	2001-07-24		50°38′33″N 114°39′15″W
Bob Creek Wildland Provincial Park	Ranchland No. 66	1999-05-12		50°0′N 114°20′W
Bow Valley Wildland Provincial Park	Kananaskis Improvement District; Canmore; Municipal District of Bighorn No. 8	1998-12-09		51°0′N 115°15′W
Brazeau Canyon Wildland Provincial Park	Yellowhead County	2000-12-20		52°48′36″N 116°46′25″W
Caribou Mountains Wildland Provincial Park	Mackenzie County	2001-07-24		59.3167°N 114.967°W
Castle Wildland Provincial Park	Pincher Creek No. 9	2017-01-20		49.241°N 114.244°W
Chinchaga Wildland Provincial Park	Clear Hills County	1999-12-15		57.1331°N 119.55°W
Dillon River Wildland Provincial Park	Regional Municipality of Wood Buffalo	2018-05-14		56.1351°N 110.1700°W
Don Getty Wildland Provincial Park	Ranchland No. 66; Kananaskis Improvement District; Municipal District of Bighorn No. 8	2001-07-24		50.89°N 114.9892°W
Dunvegan West Wildland Provincial Park	Saddle Hills County	2000-12-20		56.1678°N 119.5452°W
Elbow-Sheep Wildland Provincial Park	Kananaskis Improvement District	1995		50.635°N 115.016°W
Fidler-Greywillow Wildland Provincial Park	Regional Municipality of Wood Buffalo	1998-03		58.9364°N 110.6189°W
Fort Assiniboine Sandhills Wildland Provincial Park	Woodlands County	1997		54°24′N 114°36′W
Gipsy Lake Wildland Provincial Park	Regional Municipality of Wood Buffalo	2000-12-20		56.4953°N 110.388°W
Grand Rapids Wildland Provincial Park	Regional Municipality of Wood Buffalo; Municipal District of Opportunity No. 17	2000-12-20		56.4837°N 112.3402°W
Grizzly Ridge Wildland Provincial Park	Lesser Slave River No. 124; Big Lakes County	1999-04-14		55.1412°N 115.0503°W
Hay-Zama Lakes Wildland Provincial Park	Mackenzie County	1999-05-05		58.7759°N 119.0150°W
Hubert Lake Wildland Provincial Park	Lesser Slave River No. 124; Westlock County	2000-10-04		54°33′N 114°14′W
Kakwa Wildland Provincial Park	Greenview No. 16	1996		54.0345°N 119.811°W
Kazan Wildland Provincial Park	Regional Municipality of Wood Buffalo	2018-05-14		59.3221°N 110.6543°W
Kitaskino Nuwenëné Wildland Provincial Park	Regional Municipality of Wood Buffalo	2019-03-08		57.9115°N 111.6767°W
La Biche River Wildland Provincial Park	Athabasca County	2000-06-06		54.9883°N 112.6246°W
Lesser Slave Lake Wildland Provincial Park	Big Lakes County	2001-02-07		55°30′0″N 115°30′0″W
Marguerite River Wildland Provincial Park	Regional Municipality of Wood Buffalo	1998		57.6373°N 110.2654°W
Otter-Orloff Lakes Wildland Provincial Park	Lesser Slave River No. 124; Municipal District of Opportunity No. 17	2000-11-15		55°22′N 113°33′W
Peace River Wildland Provincial Park	Birch Hills County; Smoky River No. 130	2001-07-24		55.9881°N 117.768°W
Richardson Wildland Provincial Park	Regional Municipality of Wood Buffalo	2018-05-14		58.0943°N 111.1813°W
Rock Lake - Solomon Creek Wildland Provincial Park	Yellowhead County	2000-12-20		53.412°N 118.1169°W
Stony Mountain Wildland Provincial Park	Regional Municipality of Wood Buffalo	2000-12-20		56.2154°N 111.2444°W
Whitehorse Wildland Provincial Park	Yellowhead County	1998-08-26		52.9581°N 117.3955°W
Whitemud Falls Wildland Provincial Park	Regional Municipality of Wood Buffalo	2000-11-15		56°41′50″N 110°5′11″W
Winagami Wildland Provincial Park	Big Lakes County; Smoky River No. 130	2000-11-15		55°36′57″N 116°38′11″W

== Willmore Wilderness Park ==
Willmore Wilderness Park was established in 1959 and is managed under the Willmore Wilderness Park Act. The intent of Willmore Wilderness Park is the preservation of the natural environment, similar to the more recent wildland parks.

Name	Sub-region	Established	Image	Coordinates
Willmore Wilderness Park	Improvement District No. 25	1959		53°42′5″N 119°3′21″W

== Former provincial parks ==
Alberta Parks has closed multiple parks throughout its history, with four parks being closed during the 1930s and a number of them being given to municipalities.

Name	Sub-region	Established	Disestablished	Notes	Image
Sylvan Lake Provincial Park	Red Deer County	1980	2018	Given to the Town of Sylvan Lake and ran as a municipal park.	
Taber Provincial Park	Municipal District of Taber	1936	1999	Given to the Municipal District of Taber and ran as a municipal park	
Elkwater Lake Provincial Park	Cypress County	1932	1951	Became part of the newly created Cypress Hills Provincial Park, which later became Cypress Hills Interprovincial Park.	
Ghost River Provincial Park	Municipal District of Bighorn No. 8	1932	1950s		
Hasse Lake Provincial Park	Parkland County	1970s	2000s	Given to the county	
Lundbreck Falls Provincial Park	Municipal District of Pincher Creek No. 9	1930s	1950s	Made a Provincial Recreation Area	
Assineau River Crossing Provincial Park	Municipal District of Lesser Slave River No. 124	1930s	1950s	Turned into a campground, then the campground closed	
Gaetz Lake Provincial Park	Red Deer County	1960s	1980s-90s	Given to the city and turned into Kerry Wood Nature Sanctuary	
Ma-Me-O Beach Provincial Park	County of Wetaskiwin No. 10	1950s-60s	1980s-90s	Given to the Summer Village of Ma-Me-O Beach	
Hommey Provincial Park	County of Grande Prairie No. 1	1930s	1980s-90s	Given to the county	
Saskatoon Mountain Provincial Park	County of Grande Prairie No. 1	1930s	1950s	Given to the county	
Blue Bridge Provincial Park	Municipal District of Smoky River No. 130	1930s	1940s-50s	Given to the county	

== See also ==
- List of protected areas of Alberta
