= Lesser Slave Lake Wildland Provincial Park =

Protected area in central Alberta, Canada

- IUCN category II (national park)
- Location within Alberta Location within Canada Location within Big Lakes County
- Interactive map of Lesser Slave Lake Wildland Provincial Park
- Location: Big Lakes County, Alberta
- Nearest town: Grouard, Alberta
- Coordinates: 55°30′N 115°30′W
- Area: 3,581.450 ha (13.82806 sq mi)
- Established: 7 February 2001
- Governing body: Alberta Parks

Lesser Slave Lake Wildland Provincial Park is a wildland provincial park in central Alberta, Canada. The park was established on 7 February 2001 and has an area of 3,581.450 hectares (8,849.96 acres). The park is included in the Upper Athabasca Region Land Use Framework.

== Location ==
The park is in Big Lakes County in central Alberta, approximately 35 kilometres (22 mi) east of Grouard on township road 752A. It is on the north shore of Lesser Slave Lake from Grouard Indian Reserve 231, now Kapawe'no 231, in the east to Hilliard's Bay Provincial Park in the west. The park is accessed via township road 752A.

== Ecology ==
The park protects an example of the Central Mixedwood subregion of the Boreal Forest natural region of Alberta. In the National Ecological Framework for Canada used by Environment and Climate Change Canada, the park is in the McLennan Plain ecodistrict of the Peace Lowland ecoregion in the Central Boreal Plains ecoprovince of the Boreal Plains Ecozone. Under the OneEarth classification (previously World Wildlife Fund), the park is in the Mid-Canada Boreal Plains Forests ecoregion of the Mid-Canada Boreal Plains & Foothill Forests bioregion.

=== Geography ===
The park is long and thin; just 3.5 kilometres (2.2 mi) from north to south at its widest by 27 kilometres (17 mi) long from east to west. The park is flat in the east with an elevation of approximately 580 metres (1,900 ft). Most of this area of the park is wetlands. The western park of the park is on the slope of a hill with elevations ranging from 575 metres (1,886 ft) at the shoreline of Lesser Slave Lake to 620 metres (2,030 ft) on the hill sides.

=== Climate ===
The Köppen climate classification of the park is Continental, Subarctic (Dfc) characterized by long, cold winters, and short, warm to cool summers. Using the data from nearby weather stations (Salt Prairie Auto), average daily temperatures exceed 10 °C (50 °F) only for June, July, and August while average daily temperatures are less than 0 °C (32 °F) for November through March. The long-run average precipitation for the wettest months, June and July, is 90 to 100 millimetres (3.5 to 3.9 in) per month; conversely, it is less than 40 millimetres (1.6 in) per month from October through April.

=== Natural history themes ===
The park and adjacent lake contain habitat for fish spawning and rearing as well as areas for waterfowl staging and production. The park is also a critical moose wintering range. Bald eagles and osprey nest in the park.

== Activities ==
The park allows off-highway vehicle use. Backcountry hiking is allowed. Hunting and fishing are permitted when licensed.

== See also ==
- List of provincial parks in Alberta
- List of Canadian provincial parks
