= Otter-Orloff Lakes Wildland Provincial Park =

Protected area in central Alberta, Canada

- IUCN category II (national park)
- Location within Alberta Location within Canada
- Interactive map of Otter-Orloff Lakes Wildland Provincial Park
- Location: MD of Lesser Slave River and MD of Opportunity
- Nearest town: Calling Lake, Alberta
- Coordinates: 55°22′N 113°33′W
- Area: 6,948.00 ha (26.8264 sq mi)
- Established: 15 December 2000
- Governing body: Alberta Parks

Otter-Orloff Lakes Wildland Provincial Park is a wildland provincial park in northern Alberta, Canada. The park was established on 15 December 2000 and has an area of 6,948 hectares (17,168.88 acres; 26.83 sq mi). The park is included in the Upper Athabasca Region Land Use Framework. The park surrounds Orloff Lake and Otter Lake is named for the two lakes contained within the park.

== Location ==
The park is equally split between the Municipal Districts of Lesser Slave River and Opportunity in northern Alberta, approximately 30 kilometres (19 mi) north of Calling Lake, Alberta on Alberta Highway 813. There is no direct road access to the park. Access is north of Athabasca on Highway 813 for 50 kilometres (31 mi) and then east on a forestry road for 20 kilometres (12 mi) near Rock Island Lake fire lookout tower. Then the park is 4 kilometres (2.5 mi) by off-road vehicle, snowmobile or on foot.

== Ecology ==
The park protects an example of the Central Mixedwood subregion of the Boreal Forest natural region of Alberta. In the National Ecological Framework for Canada used by Environment and Climate Change Canada, the park is in the Cross Lake Upland ecodistrict of the Mid-Boreal Uplands ecoregion in the Central Boreal Plains ecoprovince of the Boreal Plains Ecozone. Under the OneEarth classification (previously World Wildlife Fund), the park is in the Mid-Canada Boreal Plains Forests ecoregion of the Mid-Canada Boreal Plains & Foothill Forests bioregion.

=== Geography ===
The park is flat except for the fringes where it climbs the slopes on nearby hills. The elevation of Orloff Lake is 632 metres (2,073 ft) and Otter Lake is 625 metres (2,051 ft). The slopes of the hills rises to about 680 metres (2,230 ft).

=== Climate ===
The Köppen climate classification of the park is Continental, Subarctic (Dfc) characterized by long, cold winters, and short, warm to cool summers. Using the data from nearby weather stations (Rock Island Lake Auto), average daily temperatures for the period 1991-2020 exceed 10 °C (50 °F) only for June, July, and August while average daily temperatures are less than 0 °C (32 °F) for November through April. Over the same period, the long-run average precipitation for the wettest months, June and July, is 90 to 105 millimetres (3.5 to 4.1 in) per month; conversely, it is less than 40 millimetres (1.6 in) per month from September through April.

=== Natural history themes ===
Old growth forests in the park are dominated by white spruce and balsam fir. The mature forests contain birch and balsam poplar. The younger forests in the park contain white spruce and aspen. Wetlands contain black spruce and larch. The lakes contain perch, Northern pike, walleye, and lake whitefish. They also provide habitat for beaver, muskrat and waterfowl. There is a great blue heron colony on Orloff Lake.

== Activities ==
There are no developed facilities in the park, so only random backcountry camping is permitted. Wildlife viewing and backcountry hiking are also available. On the lakes, power boating, canoeing, and kayaking can be enjoyed in the park. All-terrain vehicles in the summer and snowmobiles in the winter are permitted. Hunting and fishing are permitted when licensed.

== See also ==
- List of provincial parks in Alberta
- List of Canadian provincial parks
