= Winagami Wildland Provincial Park =

Protected area in west central Alberta, Canada

- IUCN category II (national park)
- Location within Alberta Location within Canada Location within Big Lakes County
- Location: Big Lakes County and MD of Smoky River, Alberta
- Nearest town: High Prairie, Alberta
- Coordinates: 55°38′36″N 116°40′47″W
- Area: 12,666.628 ha (48.90612 sq mi)
- Established: 15 November 2000
- Governing body: Alberta Parks

Winagami Wildland Provincial Park is a wildland provincial park in northern Alberta, Canada. The park was established on 26 August 1998 and has an area of 17,439.886 hectares (43,094.90 acres; 67.34 sq mi). The park is included in the Upper Athabasca Region Land Use Framework. The park is named for Winagami Lake which is adjacent to the park.

== Location ==
The park is in Big Lakes County and the Municipal District of Smoky River No. 130 in northern Alberta approximately 10 kilometres (6.2 mi) north of High Prairie, Alberta. The park is in two segments. The southern segment is adjacent to the southern border of Winagami Lake Provincial Park and includes a stretch of the South Heart River valley. The northern portion is adjacent to the northern border of Winagami Lake Provincial Park and consists of the area around the dammed South Heart River. Together, the two parks forms a sideways horseshoe or "C" shape with Winagami Lake at the center. Winagami Wildland and Winagami Lake Provincial Parks protect the entire shoreline and water of Winagami Lake.

== Ecology ==
The park protects a sample of the Central Mixedwood and Dry Mixedwood subregion of the Boreal Forest region of Alberta. In the National Ecological Framework for Canada used by Environment and Climate Change Canada, the park is in the McLennan Plain ecodistrict of the Peace Lowland ecoregion in the Central Boreal Plains ecoprovince of the Boreal Plains ecozone. Under the OneEarth classification (previously World Wildlife Fund), the park is in the Mid-Canada Boreal Plains Forests ecoregion of the Mid-Canada Boreal Plains & Foothill Forests bioregion.

=== Geography ===
The park is generally flat with an average elevation of 620 to 630 metres (2,030 to 2,070 ft). The lowest point is the valley of the South Heart River where it exits the park on the southern border at 588 metres (1,929 ft). The South Heart River flows into Lesser Slave Lake.

=== Climate ===
The Köppen climate classification of the park is Continental, Hemiboreal (Dfb) characterized by cold winters, and warm summers. Using the data from a nearby weather stations, High Prairie AGDM, average daily temperature from 1991 to 2020 exceeds 10 °C (50 °F) for May through September while average daily temperatures are less than 0 °C (32 °F) for November through March. At High Prairie AGDM, the long-run average precipitation from 1991 to 2020 for the wettest months, June and July, is 80 to 90 millimetres (3.1 to 3.5 in) per month; conversely, the station receive less than 30 millimetres (1.2 in) per month from October through April.

=== Natural history themes ===
The park's northern portion consists of lands around the dams of the South Heart River. This portion abuts the Heart River Dam Provincial Recreation Area. An example of the McLennan sloping fen is located within the park. This non-patterned fen is composed mainly of sphagnum peat and is covered by vegetation. Small circular mounds of Glaciolacustrine deposits are scattered throughout the wetlands, a feature not common to fens. The southern portion of the park includes the river valley of the South Heart River. The valley acts as a wildlife corridor. This portion contains a jack pine-dominated sand dunes.

The park is popular with bird watchers as more than 200 bird species have been recorded in the park. These include great blue herons and bald eagles nesting in large shoreline trees. Also American white pelican, ducks, grebes, gulls, and sandpipers are found here on bodies of water. Merlins and northern goshawks may also be seen. There is a garter snake hibernacula in the river valley.

== Activities ==
Front country camping is available at the adjacent Winagami Lake Provincial Park and Heart River Dam Provincial Recreation Area. Winagami Wildland has random backcountry camping. A trail system allows for front country hiking. Backcountry hiking and geocaching are also found here. Hunting is permitted when licensed.

== Expansion ==
Suncor Energy and the Alberta Conservation Association are working together to purchase land surrounding Winagami Lake to add it to either Winagami Lake Provincial Park or to the Wildland Park. The purchase is to offset the area impacted by Suncor’s Oil Sands Operations in Fort McMurray, Alberta. As of 2005, 190 hectares (470 acres) have been acquired to be added to the two parks.

== See also ==
- List of provincial parks in Alberta
- List of Canadian provincial parks
