= Dillon River Wildland Provincial Park =

Protected area in northern Alberta, Canada

- Dillon River Wildland Provincial Park
- IUCN category Ib (wilderness area)
- Location within Alberta Location within Canada Location within Regional Municipality of Wood Buffalo
- Location: Regional Municipality of Wood Buffalo, Alberta, Canada
- Nearest city: Fort McMurray
- Coordinates: 55°50′45″N 110°2′00″W
- Area: 191,545 ha (739.56 sq mi)
- Established: 14 May 2018
- Governing body: Alberta Tourism, Parks and Recreation

Dillon River Wildland Provincial Park is a wildland provincial park in northern Alberta, Canada. It was established on 14 May 2018 and has an area of 191,545 hectares (473,320 acres). The Government of Alberta announced the park's creation through its approval of the Lower Athabasca Regional Plan Land Use Framework in August 2012.

== Location ==
The park is located in the northeast portion of the province within the southern portion of the Regional Municipality of Wood Buffalo. It is immediately west of the Saskatchewan boundary and north of the Cold Lake Air Weapons Range. It is south of Gipsy-Gordon Wildland Provincial Park.

== Ecology ==
The park protects a segment of the Athabasca Plain subregion of the Boreal Forest region in the Natural Regions Framework for Alberta. In the National Ecological Framework for Canada used by Environment and Climate Change Canada, the park is in the Garson Lake, Christina Plain, and Mostoos Upland ecodistricts of the Mid-Boreal Uplands ecoregion of the Central Boreal Plains ecoprovince of the Boreal Plains ecozone. Under the OneEarth classification (previously World Wildlife Fund), the park is in the Mid-Canada Boreal Plains Forests ecoregion of the Mid-Canada Boreal Plains & Foothill Forests bioregion.

=== Climate ===

The Köppen climate classification of the park is Continental, Subarctic (Dfc) characterized by long, cold, dry winters, and short, cool, summers. Using the data from nearby weather stations (Kirby Lake Auto, Cowpar Lake Auto, and Christina Lake near Winefred Lake) for 1991 to 2020, the average daily temperature exceeds 10 °C (50 °F) only for June, July and August while average daily temperatures are less than 0 °C (32 °F) for November through March. At the weather stations, the long-run average precipitation from 1991 to 2020 is less than 20 mm (0.79 in) per month in the winter months of November through March. Precipitation then peaks in June and July at 90 to 100 mm (3.5 to 3.9 in) per month.

== Activities ==
Only hiking and random backcountry camping is permitted as there are no developed facilities in the park. There are ample opportunities for Wildlife observation. Hunting and fishing are allowed with the proper permits. Snowmobile and all-terrain vehicle riding are allowed on existing trails only. Off trail use is prohibited.

== See also ==
- List of provincial parks in Alberta
- List of Canadian provincial parks
- List of National Parks of Canada
