= La Biche River Wildland Provincial Park =

Protected area in central Alberta, Canada

- IUCN category II (national park)
- Location within Alberta Location within Canada Location within Athabasca County
- Interactive map of La Biche River Wildland Provincial Park
- Location: Athabasca County, Alberta
- Nearest town: Atmore, Alberta
- Coordinates: 55°0′0″N 112°36′30″W
- Area: 17,313.849 ha (66.84914 sq mi)
- Established: 6 June 2000
- Governing body: Alberta Forestry, Parks and Tourism

La Biche River Wildland Provincial Park is a wildland provincial park in northern Alberta, Canada. The park was established on 6 June 2000 and had an area of 16,843.975 hectares (41,622.37 acres; 65.03 sq mi). It was expanded on 8 August 2001 to an area of 17,545.251 hectares (43,355.26 acres; 67.74 sq mi). The park is included in the Upper Athabasca Region Land Use Framework.

== Location ==
The park is in Athabasca County in northern Alberta, approximately 75 kilometres (47 mi) northeast of Athabasca. It is west of Alberta Highway 63 between Township Road 685 in the south and Amesbury in the north. The La Biche River forms the eastern boundary of the park. The river then takes a sharp left turn and forms the northern boundary. The Athabasca River forms the western boundary. The southern boundary is Pine Creek. Other borders are completed by the Dominion Land Survey system. The park is approximately 18.5 kilometres (11.5 mi) east-to-west and the same north-to-south. There is no road access to the park. There is access through Poachers Landing Provincial Recreation Area (PRA) which is approximately 55 kilometres (34 mi) east and then north of Athabasca on public roads. Poachers Landing PRA is adjacent to La Biche WPP on the west. Once inside Poachers Landing, trails for off highway vehicles, snowmobiles, and horseback riding allow access to the Wildland Provincial Park. The PRA also allows access to the Athabasca River which connects to the park in summer and winter.

== Ecology ==
The park protects an example of the Central Mixedwood subregion of the Boreal Forest natural region of Alberta. In the National Ecological Framework for Canada used by Environment and Climate Change Canada, the park is in the Athabasca Plain ecodistrict of the Boreal Transition ecoregion in the Central Boreal Plains ecoprovince of the Boreal Plains Ecozone. Under the OneEarth classification (previously World Wildlife Fund), the park is in the Mid-Canada Boreal Plains Forests ecoregion of the Mid-Canada Boreal Plains & Foothill Forests bioregion.

=== Geography ===
The park is largely flat except for the valley where it meets the Athabasca. The elevation of the park is approximately 550 metres (1,800 ft). There are two low ridges in the northeastern part of the park reaching up to 596 metres (1,955 ft). The elevation drops to 495 metres (1,624 ft) at the Athabasca. There are several small lakes in the center of the park each about 1.6 kilometres (1 mi) long.

=== Climate ===
The Köppen climate classification of the park is Continental, Subarctic (Dfc) characterized by long, cold winters, and short, warm to cool summers. Using the data from nearby weather stations (Atmore AGCM and Wandering River Auto), average daily temperatures exceed 10 °C (50 °F) only for June, July, and August while average daily temperatures are less than 0 °C (32 °F) for November through March. The long-run average precipitation for the wettest months, June and July, is 90 to 100 millimetres (3.5 to 3.9 in) per month; conversely, it is less than 40 millimetres (1.6 in) per month from September through April.

=== Natural history themes ===
The low ridges are covered by dense forests while the land between the ridges is covered in marsh. The park protects an undisturbed boreal forest of aspen, birch, black poplar, fir, and black spruce. Carnivores found in the park include American black bear, wolverine, and lynx. Ungulates in the park include moose, and boreal woodland caribou. Beavers are found in the marsh.

== Activities ==
The park has a significant trail system allowing off-highway vehicle and horseback riding in summer and snowmobiling and dogsledding in winter but only on existing trails; off-trail use is prohibited. There are backcountry campgrounds on the western side of the park. On the waterways, Powerboating, canoeing, and kayaking are permitted. Wildlife viewing and backcountry hiking are allowed. Hunting and fishing are permitted when licensed.

== See also ==
- List of provincial parks in Alberta
- List of Canadian provincial parks
