= Hubert Lake Wildland Provincial Park =

Protected area in central Alberta, Canada

- IUCN category II (national park)
- Location within Alberta Location within Canada Location within Westlock County
- Interactive map of Hubert Lake Wildland Provincial Park
- Location: Westlock County, Alberta
- Nearest town: Fawcett, Alberta
- Coordinates: 54°33′N 114°14′W
- Area: 9,665.46 ha (37.3185 sq mi)
- Established: 4 October 2000
- Governing body: Alberta Forestry, Parks and Tourism

Hubert Lake Wildland Provincial Park is a wildland provincial park in central Alberta, Canada. The park was established on 4 October 2000 and has an area of 9,665.46 hectares (23,883.87 acres; 37.32 sq mi). The park is included in the Upper Athabasca Region Land Use Framework.

== Location ==
The park is located mostly in Westlock County in central Alberta, approximately 65 kilometres (40 mi) north-northeast of Westlock. The northern sixth of the park is in Municipal District of Lesser Slave River. The park is roughly a square shape with dimensions of 36 by 36 miles (58 by 58 km). The western boundary is the Athabasca River and the eastern boundary is the Pembina River. The northern and southern boundaries are determined by the Dominion Land Survey system. The northern boundary is the northern extent of sections 2 through 6 of township 65, range 2 west of the fourth meridian (2-65-2W5). The southern boundary is the southern extent of sections 7 through 12 of township 64, range 2 west of the fourth meridian (7-64-2W5). The park is only four kilometres (2.5 mi) west of the hamlet of Fawcett in a direct line but is over 17 kilometres (11 mi) via road because the park and the hamlet are on opposite sides of the Pembina River and a bridge must be crossed. The park is accessed via Range Road 20A which cuts north/south near the eastern border. There is a staging area midway along this road. The park has been the site of petroleum exploration and production in the past and there are still active oil and gas wells in the park. The activities for petroleum exploration and production have left behind networks of oil lease access roads, pipelines and their cutline, and seismic access lines.

== Ecology ==
The park protects a sample of the Central Mixedwood and Dry Mixedwood subregions of the Boreal Forest natural region of Alberta. In the National Ecological Framework for Canada used by Environment and Climate Change Canada, the park is in the Hondo Plain ecodistrict of the Mid-Boreal Uplands ecoregion in the Central Boreal Plains ecoprovince of the Boreal Plains Ecozone. Under the OneEarth classification (previously World Wildlife Fund), the park is in the Mid-Canada Boreal Plains Forests ecoregion of the Mid-Canada Boreal Plains & Foothill Forests bioregion.

=== Geography ===
The park is largely flat except for the valleys where it meets the two rivers. The elevation of the plateau is approximately 620 metres (2,030 ft) on the east to 635 metres (2,083 ft) on the west. The elevation drops to 600 metres (2,000 ft) at the Pembina River and to 580 metres (1,900 ft) at the Athabasca. There are several small lakes on the east side of the park: Lakes Beyette, Birston, Reid, Crane, Emslie, Hubert, King, Nelson, Norman, Samual and Ward.

=== Climate ===
The Köppen climate classification of the park is Continental, Subarctic (Dfc) characterized by long, cold winters, and short, warm to cool summers. Using the data from a nearby weather station (Duck Lake AGCM), average daily temperatures exceed 10 °C (50 °F) only for June, July, and August while average daily temperatures are less than 0 °C (32 °F) for November through March. The long-run average precipitation on the plateaus for the wettest months, June and July, is 90 to 100 millimetres (3.5 to 3.9 in) per month; conversely, it is less than 40 millimetres (1.6 in) per month from September through April.

=== Natural history themes ===
During the Last Glacial Period, the Laurentide Ice Sheet covered most of Alberta. When the ice retreated, meltwater rivers deposited sand over the area containing the park. Aeolian processes, the prevailing winds pushed the sand into dunes and created a dune complex within the present-day park which is part of larger dune field along the Athabasca River extending from Holmes Crossing Sandhills Ecological Reserve and Fort Assiniboine Sandhills Wildland Provincial Park in the southwest. Between the sand dunes are depressions containing numerous wetlands. The dominant vegetation on the sand is Jack pine. Vegetation in the wetlands is black spruce, tamarack, and patterned fens. The park contains birds such as eagles, sandhill cranes, and great blue heron. Ungulates Mule and white-tailed deer, elk, and moose. Small mammals such as beaver, fisher, and marten. Carnivores American black bear, coyote, fox, lynx, wolverine, and wolves. The lakes and wetland are excellent habitat for amphibians. The park is part of the southern range for the Slave Lake Caribou Herd and is some of the least disturbed of the caribou range.

== Activities ==
The park has a significant trail system allowing Off-highway vehicle riding in summer and snowmobiling in winter but only on existing trails; off-trail use is prohibited. There are backcountry campgrounds on the western side of the park. Wildlife viewing and backcountry hiking are allowed.

== See also ==
- List of provincial parks in Alberta
- List of Canadian provincial parks
