= Richardson Wildland Provincial Park =

Wildland provincial park in northeast Alberta, Canada

Richardson Wildland Park
- IUCN category Ib (wilderness area)
- Location within Alberta Location within Canada Location within Regional Municipality of Wood Buffalo
- Location: Regional Municipality of Wood Buffalo, Alberta, Canada
- Nearest city: Fort Chipewyan
- Coordinates: 58°15′N 111°0′W
- Area: 312,068 ha (1,204.90 sq mi)
- Established: 14 May 2018
- Governing body: Alberta Tourism, Parks and Recreation

Richardson Wildland Park is a wildland provincial park in the Regional Municipality of Wood Buffalo, northern Alberta, Canada. It was established 14 May 2018 and has an area of 312,068 hectares (1,204.90 sq mi). Two previous parks, Maybelle River Wildland Provincial Park and Richardson River Dunes Wildland Provincial Park, established in 1998, were disestablished on 14 May 2018 and the area was incorporated into Richardson Wildland Park. The park is within the Lower Athabasca Region Land Use Framework and managed within the Lower Athabasca Regional Plan.

== Location ==
The park is located near the far northeast corner of the province. It is south of Lake Athabasca and east of the Athabasca River which forms the border with Wood Buffalo National Park. To the southwest and south, the park abuts Kitaskino Nuwenëné Wildland Provincial Park and to the southeast is Marguerite River Wildland Provincial Park. The park surrounds the Athabasca Dunes Ecological Reserve. Road access is available north of Fort McMurray on Highway 63, which turns into a backcountry access road, for 170 kilometres (110 mi). Four-wheel drive vehicles are recommended year-round as road conditions may be poor.

== Ecology ==
The park contains the Athabasca Plain and Peace Athabasca Delta Subregions of the Boreal Forest Natural Region in the Natural Regions Framework for Alberta. The Boreal Forest Natural Region is characterized by short summers and long, cold winters. In the National Ecological Framework for Canada used by Environment and Climate Change Canada, the park is in the Athabasca Delta and Embarras Plain ecodistricts of the Slave River Lowland ecoregion of the Central Boreal Plains ecoprovince of the Boreal Plains ecozone. The park is also in the Carswell Plain ecodistrict, Athabasca Plain ecoregion, Western Boreal Shield ecoprovince, Boreal Shield ecozone. Under the OneEarth classification system (previously World Wildlife Fund), the park is in the Mid-Canada Boreal Plains Forests ecoregion of the Mid-Canada Boreal Plains & Foothill Forests bioregion.

The park contains vast deciduous, mixedwood, and coniferous forests interspersed with extensive Wetlands. The Athabasca Plain Natural Subregion is dominated by extensive jack pine forests. It is made up of dry, sandy plains, dune fields, and gravel-cored hills. The largest active dune system in Alberta is found in this subregion. The Peace-Athabasca Delta is the largest boreal delta in the world. It is one of the most important nesting and staging areas for waterfowl in North America and is recognized under the Ramsar Convention as an internationally important wetland.

== Activities ==
As there are no developed facilities in the park, only wildlife viewing, random backcountry camping, and backcountry hiking are available. Snowmobiles and off highway vehicles are permitted in the park. Hunting and fishing are allowed with permits.

== See also ==
- List of provincial parks in Alberta
- List of Canadian provincial parks
