= Rock Lake–Solomon Creek Wildland Provincial Park =

Protected area in central Alberta, Canada

- IUCN category Ib (wilderness area)
- Location within Alberta Location within Canada Location within Yellowhead County
- Interactive map of Rock Lake–Solomon Creek Wildland Provincial Park
- Location: Yellowhead County, Alberta
- Nearest town: Hinton, Alberta
- Coordinates: 53°27′N 118°9′W
- Area: 34,682.9 ha (133.911 sq mi)
- Established: 20 December 2000
- Governing body: Alberta Parks

Rock Lake–Solomon Creek Wildland Provincial Park is a wildland provincial park in west-central Alberta, Canada. The park was established on 20 December 2000 and has an area of 34,682.9 hectares (85,703.31 acres; 133.91 sq mi). The park is included in the Upper Athabasca Region Land Use Framework. The park is named for the local lake and creek within the boundaries of the park.

== Location ==
The park is in Yellowhead County in western Alberta, approximately 70 kilometres (43 mi) northwest of Hinton, Alberta. The park borders the Athabasca River on the south and Willmore Wilderness Park on the north. To the west is Jasper National Park. Rock Lake–Solomon Creek surrounds Rock Lake Provincial Park.

== Ecology ==
The park protects an example of the Upper Foothills subregion of the Foothills natural region of Alberta. In the National Ecological Framework for Canada used by Environment and Climate Change Canada, part of the park is in the Willmore Foothills ecodistrict of the Eastern Continental Ranges ecoregion in the Columbia Montane Cordillera ecoprovince of the Montane Cordillera ecozone. Other parts of the park are in the Berland Upland ecodistrict, Western Alberta Upland ecoregion, Boreal Foothills ecoprovince of the Boreal Plains ecoregion. Under the OneEarth classification (previously World Wildlife Fund), the park is in the Northern Rockies Conifer Forests ecoregion of the Greater Rockies & Mountain Forests bioregion.

=== Geography ===
When created, the park filled in a gap that existed between Jasper National Park and Willmore Wilderness Park. Rock Lake–Solomon Creek is typical Alberta foothills with ridges running northwest to southeast and valleys between. Four named upper foothills ranges enter the park. The Broule Range is on the south; the park cuts into the Bosche Range in the middle. The Berland and Hoff Ranges enter the northern end of the park. The park covers a diverse elevation from about 1,000 metres (3,300 ft) where Solomon Creek exits the park before meeting the Athabasca River to the peak of Broule Roche at 2,325 metres (7,628 ft). The Wildhay River and a major unnamed tributary of it run through the park. There is an extensive trail network of the park. Some of these are abandoned resource roads, some were constructed as recreation trails, while others follow old pack trails, fur trade routes and prehistoric routes used by aboriginal peoples.

=== Climate ===
The Köppen climate classification of the park is Continental, Subarctic (Dfc) characterized by long, cold winters, and short, warm to cool summers. Using the data from nearby weather stations (Willow Creek 1 and Moberly Auto), average daily temperatures for 1991 to 2020 exceed 10 °C (50 °F) only for June, July, and August while average daily temperatures are less than 0 °C (32 °F) for November through March. The long-run average precipitation for 1991 to 2020 for the wettest months, June and July, is variable between the two measuring stations. Moberly Auto gets 95 to 105 millimetres (3.7 to 4.1 in) per month while Willow Creek 1 gets only 75 to 95 millimetres (3.0 to 3.7 in); conversely, both stations receive less than 35 millimetres (1.4 in) per month from October through April.

=== Natural history themes ===
The park has one of the most diverse Upper Foothills natural history themes in Alberta. The vegetation ranges from coniferous forests of lodgepole pine and white spruce to mixedwoods and aspen. Underneath is tall shrub communities, grassy slopes, meadows, and wetlands. The park is a significant wildlife movement corridor. The valleys of Rock Creek and the Wildhay River create a low valley that allows wildlife to move with ease across the mountains and between Willmore Wilderness and Jasper National Parks. The grassy slopes provide wintering range for bighorn sheep, deer, and elk. The wetlands provide habitat for moose and a variety of birds. Carnivores include grizzly bear, American black bear, cougar, and wolf frequent the park. The park is a popular fishery for bull and rainbow trout, mountain whitefish, burbot, and northern pike. It is one of three known locations for Pygmy whitefish in Alberta.

== Activities ==
There are no developed facilities in the park but backcountry camping is permitted. Hiking, trail riding, and cross-country skiing are permitted on the extensive trails. Also found are geocaching and wildlife viewing. Hunting and fishing are permitted when licensed. As of March 2023, off-highway vehicles are not permitted.

== See also ==
- List of provincial parks in Alberta
- List of Canadian provincial parks
