= Lesser Slave Lake Provincial Park =

Provincial park in Alberta, Canada

- IUCN category IV (habitat/species management area)
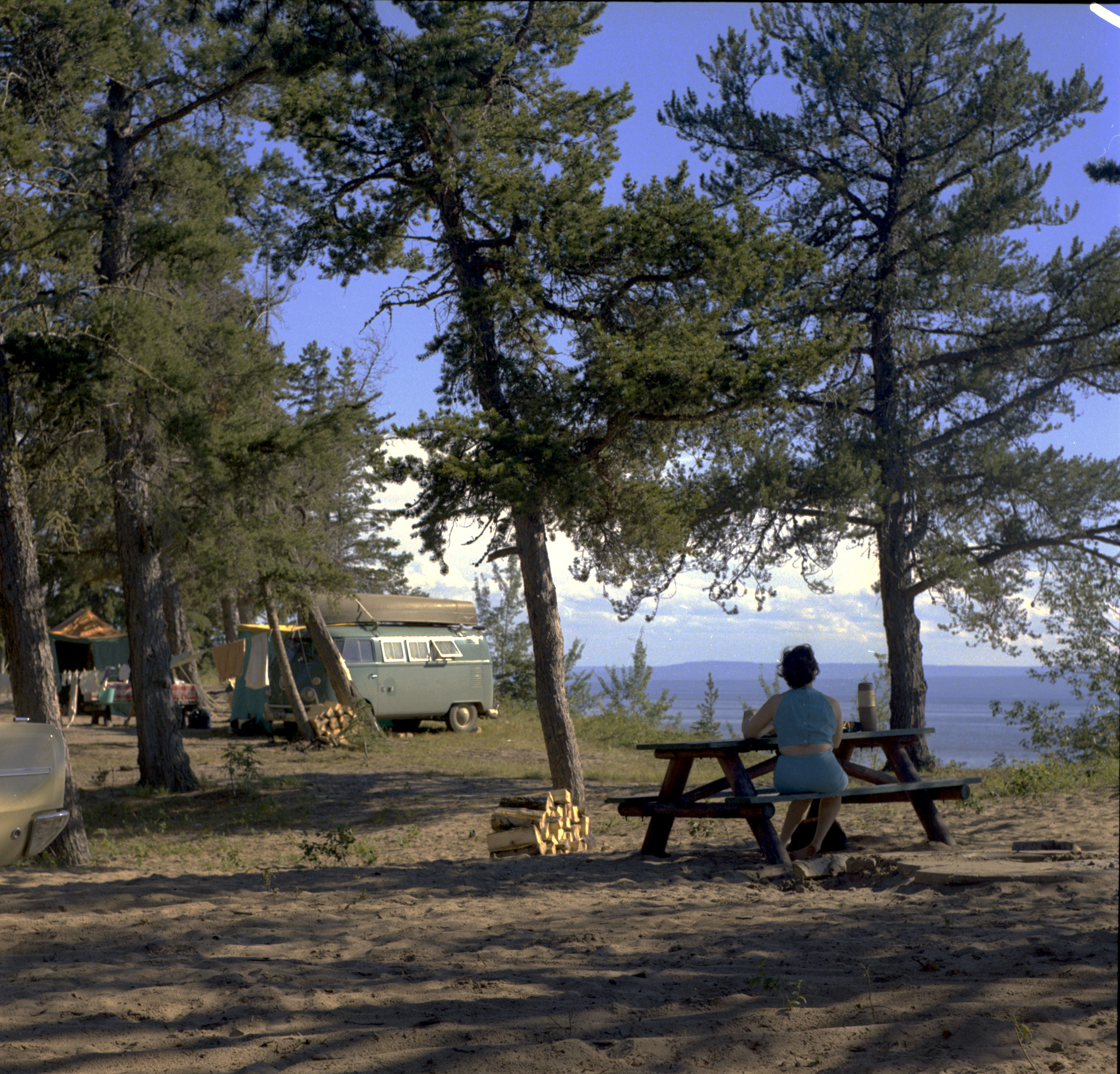
- Marten River campground, 1970

- Location within Alberta
- Interactive map of Lesser Slave Lake Provincial Park
- Location: Municipal District of Lesser Slave River No. 124, Alberta, Canada
- Nearest city: Slave Lake
- Coordinates: 55°24′44″N 114°48′49″W
- Area: 77 km^{2} (30 sq mi)
- Established: June 29, 1966
- Governing body: Alberta Tourism, Parks and Recreation

Lesser Slave Lake Provincial Park is a provincial park and birdwatching area located in north-central Alberta, Canada.

The park is located on the northeastern shore of the Lesser Slave Lake (while Hilliard's Bay Provincial Park, Lesser Slave Lake Wildland and Grouard Trail Park Reserve stand on the northwestern shore), 12 kilometres (7.5 mi) north from the town of Slave Lake on Highway 88.

Marten Mountain Viewpoint overlooks the lake at an elevation of 983 metres (3,225 ft). The Boreal Centre for Bird Conservation, an education and research centre, is also located in the park. The centre is a transit place for more than 246 bird species (including 23 species of wood warblers).

== See also ==
- List of provincial parks in Alberta
- List of Canadian provincial parks
- List of National Parks of Canada
