= Obed Lake Provincial Park =

Provincial park in Alberta, Canada

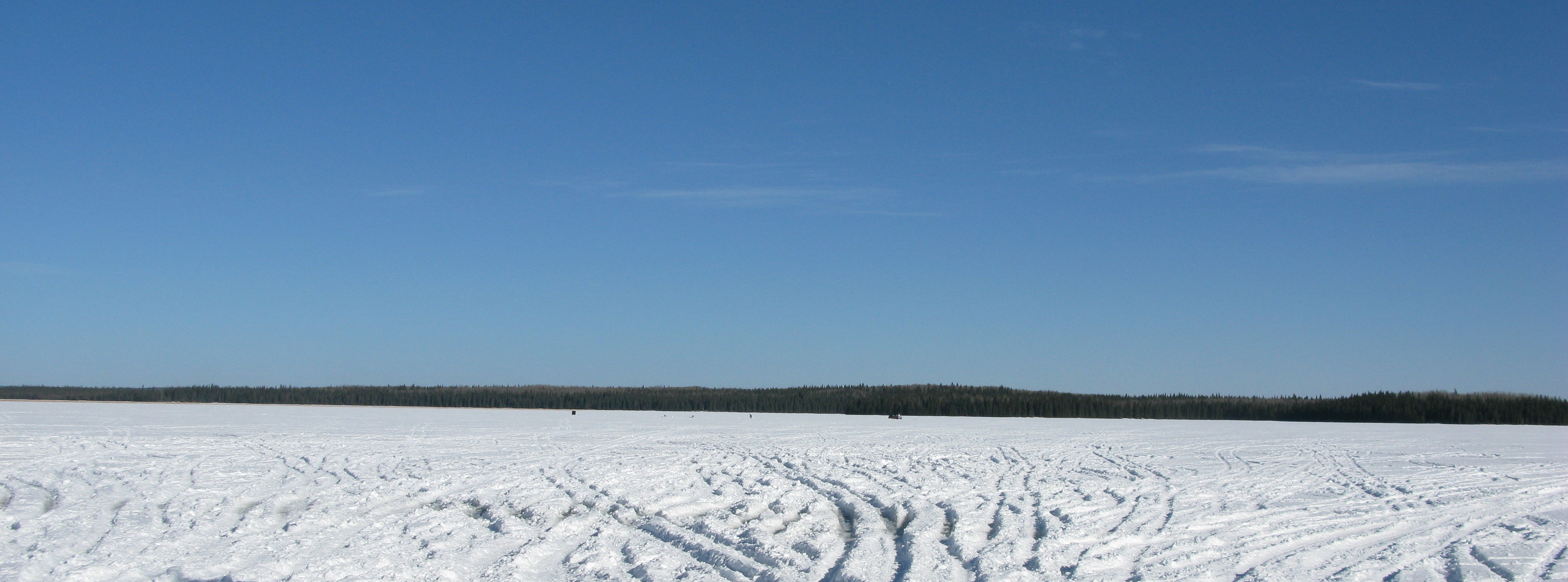
- Ice fishing on Obed Lake

- Location within Alberta
- Interactive map of Obed Lake Provincial Park
- Location: Yellowhead County, Alberta, Canada
- Nearest city: Hinton
- Coordinates: 53°33′47″N 117°05′52″W
- Area: 34 km^{2} (13 sq mi)
- Governing body: Alberta Tourism, Parks and Recreation

Obed Lake Provincial Park is a provincial park in Alberta, Canada, located 49 kilometres (30 mi) west of Edson and 37 kilometres (23 mi) east of Hinton, on the north side of the Yellowhead Highway.

The park surrounds the Obed Lakes. It is situated in a wetland system in the central foothills, between the McLeod River and Athabasca River, at an elevation of 1,065 m (3,494 ft) and has a surface area of 34 km^{2} (13 sq mi). Sundance Provincial Park is located 27 kilometres (17 mi) east of this park.

== Activities ==
The following activities are available in the park:

- Camping
- Canoeing and kayaking
- Fishing (yellow perch, brown trout, sucker)
- Power boating

== See also ==
- List of provincial parks in Alberta
- List of Canadian provincial parks
- List of National Parks of Canada
