= Brazeau Canyon Wildland Provincial Park =

Wildland provincial park in central Alberta, Canada

- IUCN category Ib (wilderness area)
- Location within Alberta Location within Canada Location within Yellowhead County
- Location: Yellowhead County, Alberta, Canada
- Nearest city: Nordegg
- Coordinates: 52°50′00″N 116°50′00″W
- Area: 5,039.32 hectares (12,452.4 acres)
- Established: 20 December 2000
- Governing body: Alberta Tourism, Parks and Recreation

Brazeau Canyon Wildland Provincial Park is a wildland provincial park in Yellowhead County, central Alberta, Canada. The park has an area of 5,039.32 hectares (12,452.43 acres; 19.46 mi^{2}) and was created on 20 December 2000. The park is named for the valley in which flows the Brazeau River. The park is contained in the Upper Athabasca Land Use Framework.

== Location ==
Brazeau Canyon is in the foothills on the eastern slopes of the Rocky Mountains. The park is approximately 40 kilometres (25 mi) northwest of Nordegg. The park surrounds the Brazeau River and is largely south of the Cardinal River Road (Gravel Flats Road), approximately 25 kilometres (16 mi) west of the Forestry Trunk Road. The south end of the park adjoins Jasper National Park where the river exits the national park. A separate section of the park is a 260-hectare (640-acre) area encompassing Muskiki Lake and is a few kilometers north of the main section of the park.

== Ecology ==
The park contains Upper Foothills subregion of the Foothills region and the Alpine and Sub-alpine subregions of the Rocky Mountain Natural Region in the Alberta classification system. In the National Ecological Framework for Canada used by Environment and Climate Change Canada, the park is in the Luscar Foothills and the Ram River Foothills ecodistricts of the Western Alberta Upland ecoregion of the Boreal Foothills ecoprovince of the Boreal Plains ecozone.

The Brazeau River flows through steep-walled canyons approximately 60 metres (200 ft) deep and often less than 200 metres (660 ft) from rim to rim. The park protects the valley and adjacent uplands and includes the former Muskiki Lake Natural Area and the western part of Marshybank Ecological Reserve. It specifically protects the "bed and shore" of the Brazeau River. There are mineral springs that contain sodium, calcium, potassium, magnesium, and other trace elements. The springs are used as mineral licks by elk, deer, and moose as well as providing mineral-rich soils for a variety of plants.

== Activities ==
Backcountry camping and hiking are permitted within the park; there are no developed campsites. The park is focused on protecting the river; however, canoeing and kayaking are permitted. Hunting and fishing are allowed with authorization. Although there are no developed trails, old roads and seismic lines are used for hiking and horseback riding.

== See also ==
- List of Alberta provincial parks
- List of Canadian provincial parks
- Ecology of the Rocky Mountains
