= Tillebrook Provincial Park =

Provincial park in Alberta, Canada

- Location within Alberta
- Interactive map of Tillebrook Provincial Park
- Location: County of Newell, Alberta Canada
- Nearest city: Brooks, Tilley
- Coordinates: 50°32′16″N 111°48′30″W
- Area: 1.5 km^{2} (370 acres)
- Established: July 20, 1965
- Governing body: Alberta Tourism, Parks and Recreation

Tillebrook Provincial Park is a provincial park located in Alberta, Canada. It is situated on the south side of the Trans-Canada Highway, 8 km (5.0 mi) east of the city of Brooks and 16 km (9.9 mi) west of the village of Tilley (hence the name), within the County of Newell in southern Alberta.

The park has an elevation of 760 m (2,490 ft) and has a surface of 1.5 km^{2} (0.58 sq mi). It was established on July 20, 1965, and is maintained by Alberta Tourism, Parks and Recreation. A camping site is maintained within the grounds.

== See also ==
- List of provincial parks in Alberta
- List of Canadian provincial parks
- List of National Parks of Canada
