= Pierre Grey's Lakes Provincial Park =

Provincial park in Alberta, Canada

- Location within Alberta
- Interactive map of Pierre Grey's Lakes Provincial Park
- Location: Municipal District of Greenview No. 16, Alberta, Canada
- Nearest city: Grande Cache
- Coordinates: 53°54′11″N 118°35′25″W
- Governing body: Alberta Tourism, Parks and Recreation

Pierre Grey's Lakes Provincial Park is a provincial park in Alberta, Canada, located 37 km (23 mi) south of Grande Cache, on the north side of the Bighorn Highway.

The park is situated around the five Pierre Grey Lakes, at an elevation of 1,250 m (4,100 ft). A historic trading post is located in the park, adding to the attraction offered by the rainbow trout and brook trout stocked lakes. It is maintained by Ministry of Forestry and Parks.

== Activities ==
Activities available in the park include:

- Camping
- Canoeing and kayaking
- Cross-country skiing
- Fishing and ice fishing
- Hiking
- Power boating

== See also ==
- List of provincial parks in Alberta
- List of Canadian provincial parks
- List of National Parks of Canada
