= Strathcona Science Provincial Park =

Provincial park in Alberta, Canada

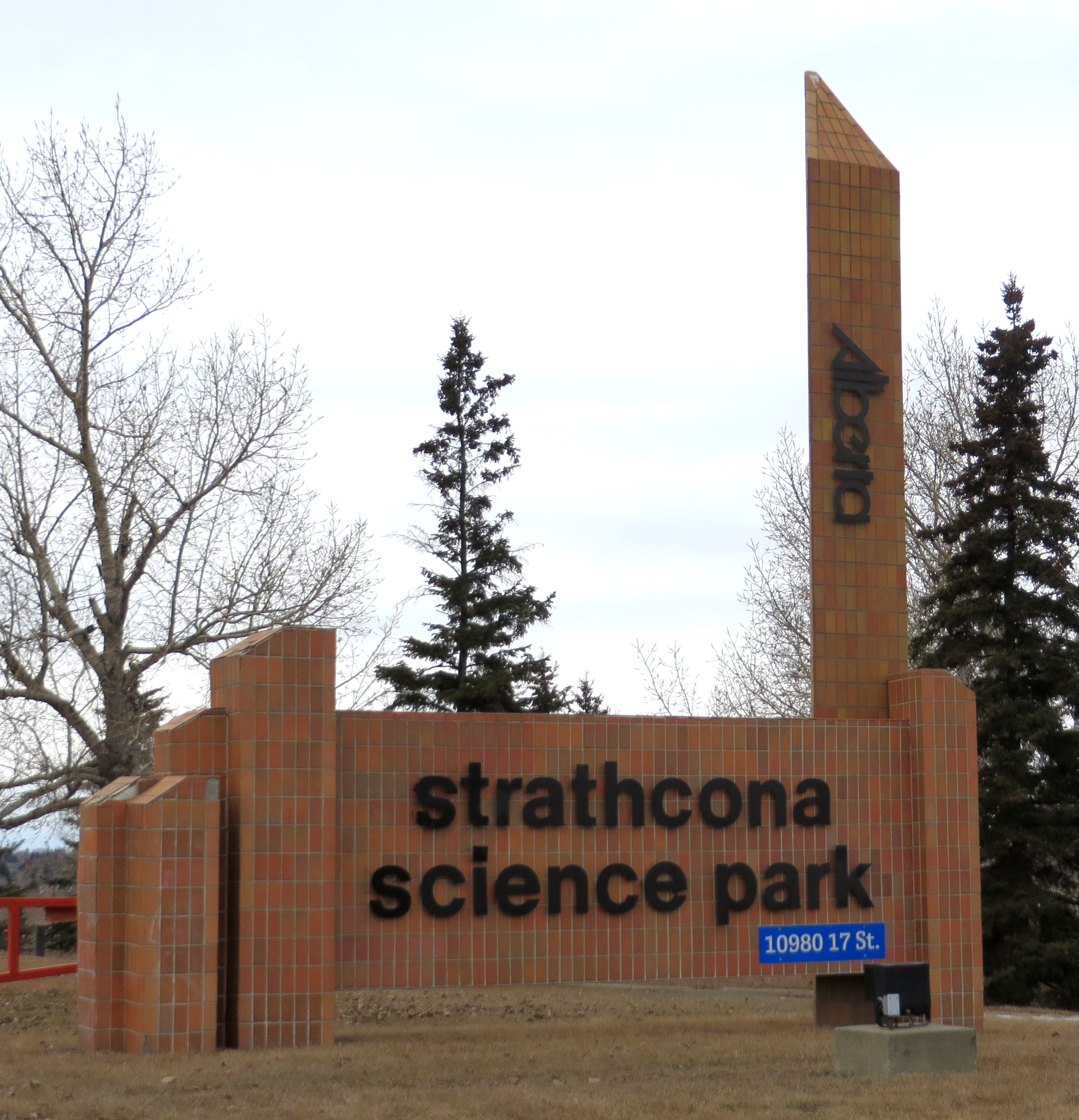

- Location within Alberta
- Interactive map of Strathcona Science Provincial Park
- Location: Edmonton / Sherwood Park, Alberta, Canada
- Nearest city: Edmonton
- Coordinates: 53°33′46″N 113°22′17″W
- Area: 2.9 km^{2} (1.1 sq mi)
- Established: December 12, 1979
- Governing body: Alberta Tourism, Parks and Recreation

Strathcona Science Provincial Park is a provincial park in Alberta, Canada, located between Edmonton and Sherwood Park, south of the Yellowhead Highway and west of Anthony Henday Drive.

The park is situated in the North Saskatchewan River valley, on both banks of the river, at an elevation of 625 m (2,051 ft) and has a surface of 2.9 km^{2} (1.1 sq mi). It was established on December 12, 1979 and is maintained by Alberta Tourism, Parks and Recreation.

This site was for thousands of years the site of an annual aboriginal camp, as it was located close enough to the river for transportation and trade and the bluffs of the river valley provided excellent bison-hunting opportunities. The park was established to preserve the site from encroaching industrial development. It was the site of archeological excavations in 1978 to 1980.

The park contained several abandoned interpretive buildings opened by the Alberta government in 1980 but now demolished. Remnants of the park's history as a public science center include tiled triangular obelisks, a boardwalk through the archaeological area, and a few interpretive plaques. The area is safe but overgrown.

== Activities ==
The following activities are available in the park:

- Cross-country skiing (5 km (3.1 mi) trails)
- Downhill skiing (in the Sunridge Ski Hill)
- Front country hiking
- Mountain biking (8 km (5.0 mi) of paths along North Saskatchewan River)
- Tobogganing
- Radio-controlled aircraft flying range

== See also ==
- List of provincial parks in Alberta
- List of Canadian provincial parks
- List of National Parks of Canada
- List of science centers
