= Cold Lake Provincial Park =

Provincial park in Alberta, Canada

- IUCN category II (national park)
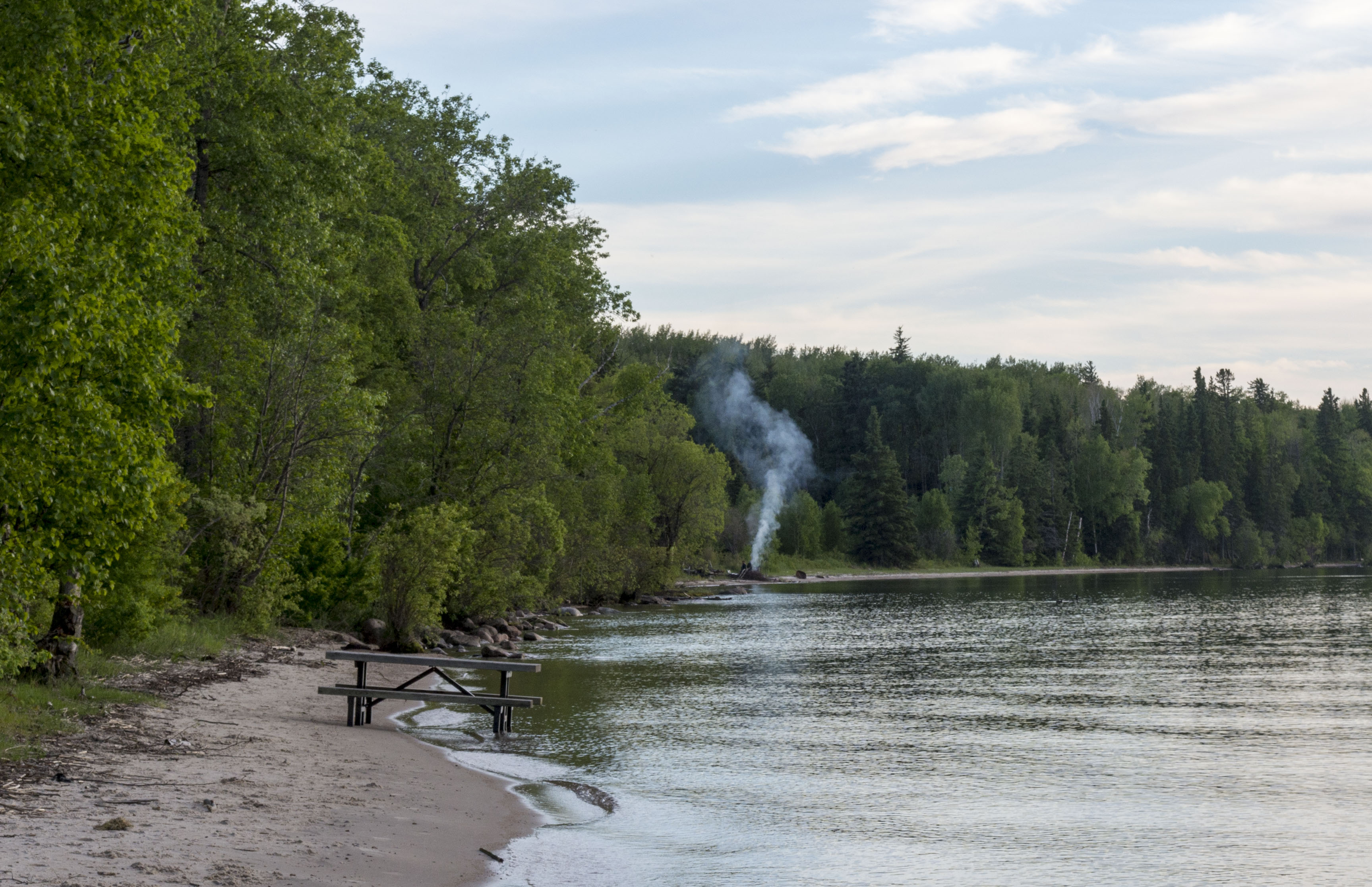

- Location within Alberta
- Interactive map of Cold Lake Provincial Park
- Location: Municipal District of Bonnyville No. 87, Alberta, Canada
- Nearest city: Cold Lake
- Coordinates: 54°28′16″N 110°06′34″W
- Area: 62 km^{2} (24 sq mi)
- Established: August 18, 1976
- Governing body: Alberta Tourism, Parks and Recreation

Cold Lake Provincial Park is a provincial park in northeastern Alberta, Canada.

It is located 3 kilometres (1.9 mi) east of the city of Cold Lake, on Highway 28, and extends to the Saskatchewan border.

The park protects the boreal forest in a number of designated areas on the southern and northern shores of Cold Lake, one of the largest lakes in Alberta. These shores are important nesting grounds for waterfowl.

The forest contains poplar, birch, spruce, and other types of wood.

The protected area is continued into Saskatchewan with the Meadow Lake Provincial Park.

== Activities ==
Recreational facilities are located in the park including campground and day use areas. Camping, canoeing, fishing (and ice fishing), sailing, power boating and other water sports are popular activities. 11.5 km of trails are maintained in the park, and are used for hiking, mountain biking, cross-country skiing and show walking.

Sport fishing is allowed in Cold Lake (brook stickleback, burbot, emerald shiner, fathead minnow, finescale dace, Iowa darter, lake trout, lake whitefish, logperch, longnose sucker, ninespine stickleback, northern pike, northern redbelly dace, slimy sculpin, spoonhead sculpin, spottail shiner, tullibee (cisco), walleye, white sucker, yellow perch) and Medley River (brook stickleback, burbot, emerald shiner, fathead minnow, finescale dace, lake chub, logperch, longnose sucker, northern redbelly dace, northern pearl dace, rainbow trout, spoonhead sculpin, spottail shiner, white sucker).

== See also ==
- List of provincial parks in Alberta
- List of Canadian provincial parks
