= Woolford Provincial Park =

Provincial park in Alberta, Canada

- Location within Alberta
- Interactive map of Woolford Provincial Park
- Location: Cardston County, Alberta Canada
- Nearest city: Cardston
- Coordinates: 49°10′41″N 113°11′28″W
- Area: 0.4 km^{2} (0.15 sq mi)
- Governing body: Alberta Tourism, Parks and Recreation

Woolford Provincial Park is a provincial park in Alberta, Canada, located 17.5 km (10.9 mi) east of Cardston, west of Highway 503. This provincial park is situated along St. Mary River at an elevation of 1,130 m (3,710 ft) and has a surface of 0.4 km^{2} (0.15 sq mi). It lies to the northeast from Waterton Lakes National Park.

== Activities ==
The following activities are available in the park:

- Canoeing and kayaking
- Fishing for westslope cutthroat trout, rainbow trout, pike and walleye in the St. Mary River
- Front country hiking on trails maintained in the St. Mary River valley
- Wildlife viewing (wolverines, bighorn sheep, bald eagles, white-tailed deer, mule deer, mountain goats, Rocky Mountain elk, grizzly bear, western moose, American pika, red foxes, North American beaver, Canada lynx, river otter, bobcat, black bear, northern Rocky Mountain wolf, plains bison, coyote, cougar, snowshoe hare and hoary marmot)

== See also ==
- List of provincial parks in Alberta
- List of Canadian provincial parks
- List of National Parks of Canada
