= Fort Assiniboine Sandhills Wildland Provincial Park =

Protected area in central Alberta, Canada

- IUCN category II (national park)
- Location within Alberta Location within Canada Location within Woodlands County
- Interactive map of Fort Assiniboine Sandhills Wildland Provincial Park
- Location: Woodlands County, Alberta
- Nearest town: Fort Assiniboine
- Coordinates: 54°24′0″N 114°36′0″W
- Area: 7,903 ha (30.51 sq mi)
- Established: 1997
- Governing body: Alberta Forestry, Parks and Tourism

Fort Assiniboine Sandhills Wildland Provincial Park is a wildland provincial park in Woodlands County, Alberta, Canada. The park is 7,903 hectares (19,530 acres) in area and was established in 1997. The park is contained in the Upper Athabasca Land Use Framework. The park is managed through the Fort Assiniboine Sandhills Wildland Provincial Park Management Plan. The Klondike Trail passes through the western section of the park for about five kilometres (3 mi). This trail was first established in 1824–1825 as a portage between Fort Edmonton on the North Saskatchewan River and Fort Assiniboine on the Athabasca River. The portage was part of the York Factory Express, a 19th-century fur brigade route of the Hudson's Bay Company from Fort Vancouver on the Columbia River (today's Vancouver, Washington) to York Factory on Hudson Bay. The trail was revived again during the Klondike Gold Rush in 1897–1899 as part of the overland route to the Klondike gold fields near Dawson City, Yukon. Today, the section of the Klondike Trail within the park extends north of the Klondike Trail Staging Area and includes the ruins of a trapper's cabin and the gravesite of a child who died during trek.

== Location ==
The park is located in central Alberta about 15 kilometres (9.3 mi) northeast of Fort Assiniboine and about fifty kilometres (31 mi) northwest of Barrhead. The Athabasca River forms the eastern boundary of the park and Highway 661 forms the northern. In addition to the main parcel of land, the park also includes Pemmican Island and other islands within the Athabasca River lying generally south of the main parcel. Access to the north and central part of the park is via Highway 661; Fort Assiniboine from the west and the Vega ferry crossing from the east. Access is also available from the south via Township Road 621A.

== Ecology ==
The park protects part of the Central Mixedwood subregion of the Boreal Forest Natural Region. The climate is subhumid, continental with short, cool summers and long, cold winters. The climate classification is Continental, Subarctic (or Boreal) (Köppen classification Dfc). It is almost warm enough to be classified as Humid Continental (Dfb) but the May and September average temperatures are just below 10 °C (50 °F).

Geographically, the park is a broad plain with an average elevation of 650 metres (2,130 ft) that has been cut by the Athabasca River leaving behind the valley at an elevation of 575 metres (1,886 ft). The geomorphological difference has created two distinct environments: Inland dunes and Riparian forests. During the Last Glacial Period, the Laurentide Ice Sheet covered most of Alberta. When the ice retreated, meltwater rivers deposited sand over the area containing the park. Aeolian processes, the prevailing winds pushed the sand into dunes and created a dune complex within the present-day park which is part of larger dune field extending along the Athabasca River. The Holmes Crossing Sandhills Ecological Reserve, approximately twenty kilometres (12 mi) upstream from Fort Assiniboine Sandhills WPP and Hubert Lake Wildland Provincial Park, 25 kilometres (16 mi) downstream are part of this dune field. These dunes cover the eastern two-thirds of the park. Growing on the dunes are jack pine lichen forests. The valleys and troughs between the dunes are filled with fens (peat-accumulating, mineral-rich wetlands); including fens with open water, fens in varying stages of sedge succession, and fens dominated by larch. Many fens are dominantly treed on their west sides and gradually changing to dominantly sedges on their east sides. The western third of the park (west of the Klondike Trail) is wetlands with organic soils. Sand dunes and dry Savannas are not found in this portion of the park. These wetlands contain black spruce, larch, bog cranberry, Labrador tea plus a variety of sedges and mosses.

The geology and ecology of the Athabasca River valley are significantly different than the rest of the park. The river valley geology and geomorphology is typical of a river crossing the prairies: fluvial processes have left a wide floodplain with many meanders; fluvial terraces; meander scars and oxbow lakes; and current and abandoned channels. The river splits and converges in the park creating river islands. The valley walls may be steeply inclined or eroded. Limited areas of Colluvium (areas of mass slumping) create unique Habitats. The riparian zone has a variety of plants including old growth and mixedwood forests consisting of Jack pine, white spruce, green alder, big red stem moss, balsam poplar, Alaska birch, and aspen.

The old growth forests contain many mosses (Brachythecium albicans, campestre, and rutabulum; Campylium polygamun, radicale; Entodon schleicheri; and Zygodon viridissmus) and lichen (Peltigera collina, evansiana, horizontalis; Physcia dimidiata; Physconia enteroxantha; and Heterodermia speciosa) that are rare in Alberta. Other rare plants in the park include: Low milkweed (Asclepias ovalifolia), Rock little clubmoss (Seloginella rupesths), MacCalla's aster (Aster x maccallae), Lakeshore sedge (Carex lacustris), Lichen (Melanelia olivacea), and Prairie wedge grass (Spenopholis obtusata).

Sandhill cranes nest in the fens. Mule deer, white-tailed deer, moose, beaver, mink, muskrat, and river otter are commonly seen in the park. The old growth forests provide habitat for such species as the great gray owl, Cooper's hawk, and pileated woodpecker.

== Activities ==
Except for three small staging areas (day use only), there are no developed facilities in the park so camping is random backcountry. Wildlife viewing, birding, and geocaching are available within the park. Hiking, trail running, cross country skiing, snowshoeing, and equestrian trail riding are also available on extensive trails within the park. Hunting and fishing are permitted with proper authorization (licensed and in-season).

== See also ==
- List of provincial parks in Alberta
- List of Canadian provincial parks
