= Dunvegan West Wildland Provincial Park =

Provincial park in Alberta, Canada

- IUCN category Ib (wilderness area)
- Location within Alberta Location within Canada
- Location: [[Saddle Hills County] Alberta]], Canada
- Nearest city: Grande Prairie
- Coordinates: 56°10′00″N 119°33′00″W
- Area: 20,967.8 ha (51,813 acres)
- Established: 20 December 2000
- Governing body: Alberta Tourism, Parks and Recreation

Dunvegan West Wildland Provincial Park is a wildland provincial park in Saddle Hills County, Alberta, Canada. The park was created on 20 December 2000 and has an area of 20,967.8 hectares (210 km^{2}; 81 mi^{2}). The park consists of several separated parcels of land along the south bank of the Peace River from Dunvegan west to the British Columbia border.

== Ecology ==
The park protects part of the Peace River parkland ecological subregion which is the smallest subregion in Alberta, accounting for only 0.5 percent of the area of the province. The park also contains the dry mixedwood subregion of the Boreal Forest.

The river and creek valley cliffs are home to nesting bald eagles, golden eagles, and falcons. The valleys provide year-round habitat for deer and elk.

== Activities ==
The park is not developed with camping facilities so only backcountry camping and hiking is permitted. Hunting and fishing are allowed with proper permits. Canoeing and kayaking on the creeks running into the Peace River are permitted.

== See also ==
- Peace River Country
- List of Alberta provincial parks
- List of Canadian provincial parks
