= Park Lake Provincial Park =

Provincial park in Alberta, Canada

- Location within Alberta
- Interactive map of Park Lake Provincial Park
- Location: Lethbridge County, Alberta Canada
- Nearest city: Lethbridge
- Coordinates: 49°48′46″N 112°55′12″W
- Area: 2.5 km^{2} (0.97 sq mi)
- Established: November 21, 1932
- Governing body: Alberta Tourism, Parks and Recreation

Park Lake Provincial Park is a provincial park located in Alberta, Canada, 18 km (11 mi) north of Lethbridge.

The park surrounds Park Lake, and is situated at an elevation of 945 m (3,100 ft) and has a surface of 2.5 km^{2} (0.97 sq mi). It was established on November 21, 1932 and is maintained by Alberta Tourism, Parks and Recreation.

== Activities ==
The following activities are available in the park:

- Baseball
- Beach activities (sailing and swimming)
- Camping
- Canoeing and kayaking
- Fishing and ice fishing (fish species include burbot, fathead minnow, lake whitefish, longnose sucker, northern pike, spottail shiner, walleye, white sucker and yellow perch)
- Front country hiking
- Mountain biking

== See also ==
- List of provincial parks in Alberta
- List of Canadian provincial parks
- List of National Parks of Canada
