= Sundance Provincial Park =

Canadian Provincial Park

- IUCN category II (national park)
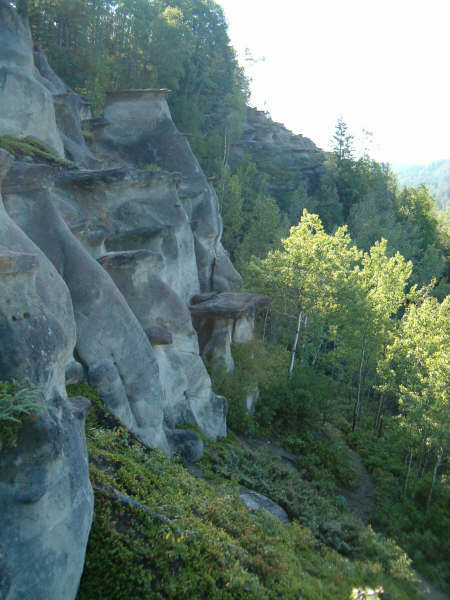
- Hoodoos in Sundance Provincial Park

- Location within Alberta
- Interactive map of Sundance Provincial Park
- Location: Yellowhead County, Alberta, Canada
- Nearest city: Slave Lake
- Coordinates: 53°38′18″N 116°52′37″W
- Area: 37 km^{2} (14 sq mi) (park); 79 km^{2} (31 mi^{2}) (total)
- Established: April 28, 1999
- Governing body: Alberta Tourism, Parks and Recreation

Sundance Provincial Park is a provincial park located in western Alberta, Canada, 100 km east of Jasper National Park. The park is accessed via Emerson Creek Road, running north of Edson and Hinton, roughly parallel to the Yellowhead Highway.

== The two parks ==
The park has two distinct parts. The first, surrounding the five Emerson lakes and bordering the Athabasca River, has camping, fishing, and a number of small trails circling the lakes. The second section, much larger, protects a series of hoodoos carved into the sandstone cliffs of the foothill valley, surrounding Sundance Creek and Sundance Lake. The "Wild Sculpture Trail" is located in this section of the park. The two parks have a total surface of 37 km^{2}, and an additional 42 km^{2} "Special Management Zone" buffer surrounds the two areas.

== See also ==
- List of provincial parks in Alberta
- List of Canadian provincial parks
- List of National Parks of Canada
