= Big Island Provincial Park =

Provincial park in Alberta, Canada

- Location within Alberta
- Interactive map of Big Island Provincial Park
- Location: Alberta, Canada
- Nearest city: Edmonton
- Coordinates: 53.440820°N 113.645997°W
- Area: 68 ha (170 acres)
- Established: February 16, 2023
- Governing body: Alberta Tourism, Parks and Recreation

Big Island Provincial Park is a 68-hectare provincial park in southwest Edmonton, Alberta, Canada.

== Description ==
The entire park is contained on Big Island in the North Saskatchewan River. As of 2024 there is no way for the public to legally access the park except by canoe; however, Alberta Parks is planning to make the park more accessible.

Across the river from the island to the east is the River Ridge Golf Club and the neighbourhood of Windermere. The shore to the west of the park is all private property, although there is a private road into the park. The park itself features a day-use area and some trails which are still being developed by Alberta Parks. The park also hosts a large amount of wetlands especially on the western side of the island, as well as some meadows though the island is mostly dominated by parkland forest.

== Activities ==
Activities currently allowed at the park include swimming, canoeing, kayaking, hiking and wildlife watching, including birdwatching.

== History ==
During the early years of Edmonton's development, the island was sometimes visited by steamships for day trips. Prior to being a provincial park the island was a natural area. In 2019 the Alberta government started working with the City of Edmonton and the Enoch Cree to develop the island into a park in hopes of creating more greenspace in Edmonton's North Saskatchewan River valley.

A proposal for the park was formally made in 2022. The park was established February 16, 2023. Shortly thereafter, the province committed $9.6 million in funding for the further development of the park. The island has been subject to flooding many times over the years including in 1929 when the entire island was split in two.

== Ecology ==
Birds in the park include American robin, bald eagle, mallard, red-winged blackbird, American wigeon, common nighthawk, and great blue heron. Mammals that have been observed in the park include moose, fisher, porcupine, coyote, and beaver.

== See also ==
- List of provincial parks in Alberta
