= ESRD =

ESRD may stand for:

- Kidney failure, or end-stage renal disease
- Alberta Environment and Sustainable Resource Development, in Canada
