= Stony Mountain Wildland Provincial Park =

Protected area in northern Alberta, Canada

- IUCN category Ib (wilderness area)
- Location within Alberta Location within Canada
- Location: Wood Buffalo, Alberta, Canada
- Nearest city: Fort McMurray
- Coordinates: 56°12′55″N 111°14′40″W
- Area: 13,974 ha (34,530 acres)
- Established: 20 December 2000
- Governing body: Alberta Forestry, Parks and Tourism

Stony Mountain Wildland Provincial Park is a wildland provincial park in Wood Buffalo, northern Alberta, Canada. The park was established on 20 December 2000 and has an area of 13,974 hectares (34,530 acres). The park is part of the Lower Athabasca Regional Plan.

== Location ==
The park is 53 kilometres (33 mi) south of Fort McMurray and equidistant between Highway 63 and Highway 881. The park is remote; access is east of Highway 63 on a forestry road for 10 kilometres (6.2 mi) to a dead-end staging area. The remaining trail into the park is approximately 8 kilometres (5.0 mi) and accessible by off-highway vehicle or snowmobile.

== Ecology ==
The park is in the Lower Boreal Highlands subregion of the Boreal Forest natural region of Alberta. The park preserves examples of patterned and non-patterned fens. Six provincially rare plants have been identified in the vicinity of Maqua Lake, which is located just north of the park. The park is part of the range of the East Side Athabasca River Boreal woodland caribou herd.

== Activities ==
The park has no developed facilities so only wildlife viewing, backcountry hiking, and random backcountry camping are available. Off-highway vehicles and snowmobiles are permitted on existing trails only. Aircraft access and landing in the park requires authorization. Hunting is allowed with proper permits.

== See also ==
- List of Alberta provincial parks
- List of Canadian provincial parks
