= Crow Lake Provincial Park =

Provincial park in Alberta, Canada

- Location within Alberta
- Interactive map of Crow Lake Provincial Park
- Location: Lac La Biche County, Alberta, Canada
- Nearest city: Fort McMurray
- Coordinates: 55°47′57″N 112°08′45″W
- Area: 7.7 km^{2} (3.0 sq mi)
- Governing body: Alberta Tourism, Parks and Recreation

Crow Lake Provincial Park is a provincial park in Alberta, Canada. It is located on the northern and western shore of Crow Lake, along Highway 63, 130 kilometres (81 mi) south of Fort McMurray and 154 kilometres (96 mi) north of Lac La Biche.

The park is situated at an elevation of 615 m (2,018 ft), and has a surface of 7.7 km^{2} (3.0 sq mi).

== Activities ==
Canoeing and kayaking are available activities in the park.

== See also ==
- List of Alberta provincial parks
- List of Canadian provincial parks
- List of National Parks of Canada
