= Whitney Lakes Provincial Park =

Provincial park in Alberta, Canada

Coordinates: 53°51′N 110°32′W

Whitney Lakes Provincial Park is a provincial park located in Alberta, Canada. It is located in the southeastern part of the County of St. Paul No. 19.

It was established on June 23, 1982.

== See also ==
- List of provincial parks in Alberta
- List of Canadian provincial parks
- List of National Parks of Canada
