= Beauvais Lake Provincial Park =

Provincial park in Alberta, Canada

- Location within Alberta
- Interactive map of Beauvais Lake Provincial Park
- Location: Municipal District of Pincher Creek No. 9, Alberta, Canada
- Nearest city: Pincher Creek, Lethbridge
- Coordinates: 49°24′51″N 114°06′54″W
- Area: 11.5 km^{2} (4.4 sq mi)
- Established: February 1, 1954
- Governing body: Alberta Tourism, Parks and Recreation

Beauvais Lake Provincial Park is a provincial park located west of Pincher Creek, Alberta, Canada. The park is popular with tourists for its mountain scenery and its rainbow trout fishing, and is open year round.

On the lake's western end, there is a campground that is open year-round. Due to popularity, it is suggested that reservations be made up to three months in advance.

== See also ==
- List of Alberta provincial parks
- List of Canadian provincial parks
- List of National Parks of Canada
