= Rock Lake Provincial Park =

Provincial park in Alberta, Canada

- Location within Alberta
- Interactive map of Rock Lake Provincial Park
- Location: Yellowhead County, Alberta, Canada
- Nearest city: Hinton
- Coordinates: 53°28′2″N 118°15′10″W
- Governing body: Alberta Tourism, Parks and Recreation; Operated by Hinton Wood Products

Rock Lake Provincial Park is a provincial park in Alberta, Canada, located on the shores of Rock Lake, 64 km (40 mi) north-west from Hinton, north on the Bighorn Highway and 39 km west on an access road.

The park is situated around Rock Lake, on the eastern slopes of the Canadian Rockies, immediately east of Jasper National Park and Willmore Wilderness Park, at an elevation of 1,440 m (4,720 ft). It is managed by Alberta Tourism, Parks and Recreation and operated by Hinton Wood Products company.

There is, or was a bombshelter located in the basement of the ranger station.

== Activities ==
The following activities are available in the park:

- Camping
- Canoeing and kayaking
- Fishing (Bull trout, Lake trout, Mountain whitefish, Northern pike)
- Backcountry and front country hiking
- Horseback riding (the park is a primary staging area for Willmore Wilderness Park's 750 km of equestrian and hiking trails)
- Mountain biking
- Power boating
- Swimming

== See also ==
- List of provincial parks in Alberta
- List of Canadian provincial parks
- List of National Parks of Canada
