= Gooseberry Lake Provincial Park =

Provincial park in Alberta, Canada

- Location within Alberta
- Interactive map of Gooseberry Lake Provincial Park
- Location: Special Area No. 4, Alberta, Canada
- Nearest city: Consort
- Coordinates: 52°07′01″N 110°45′33″W
- Area: 0.9 km^{2} (0.35 sq mi)
- Established: November 21, 1932
- Governing body: Alberta Tourism, Parks and Recreation

Gooseberry Lake Provincial Park is a provincial park in Alberta, Canada, located 13.5 km (8.4 mi) north from Consort and 51 km (32 mi) south from Czar, immediately east of Buffalo Trail.

The park is situated on the north-western shore of Gooseberry Lake, at an elevation of 700 metres (2,300 ft) and has a surface of .9 square kilometres (0.35 sq mi). It was established on November 21, 1932 and is maintained by Alberta Tourism, Parks and Recreation.

== Activities ==
The following activities are available in the park:

- Birdwatching (sanderlings, red-necked phalaropes, ducks, geese, swans, gulls, great blue herons, American white pelicans and a small population of the nationally endangered piping plover)
- Camping
- Fishing

== See also ==
- List of provincial parks in Alberta
- List of Canadian provincial parks
- List of National Parks of Canada
