= Whitemud Falls Wildland Provincial Park =

Protected area in northern Alberta, Canada

- IUCN category Ib (wilderness area)
- Location within Alberta Location within Canada
- Location: Wood Buffalo, Alberta, Canada
- Nearest city: Fort McMurray
- Coordinates: 56°41′50″N 110°5′11″W
- Area: 3,842.55 ha (9,495.1 acres)
- Established: 15 November 2000
- Governing body: Alberta Tourism, Parks and Recreation

Whitemud Falls Wildland Provincial Park is a wildland provincial park in Wood Buffalo, northern Alberta, Canada. The park was established on 15 November 2000 and has an area of 3,842.55 hectares (9,495.1 acres). The park is part of the Lower Athabasca Regional Plan.

== Location ==
The park surrounds the Whitemud Falls Ecological Reserve, which contains the Whitemud Falls, on the Clearwater River. The park's eastern limit is the Saskatchewan border, and the park extends west approximately 13 kilometres (8 mi). The maximum north-south extent of the park is approximately 7.2 kilometres (4.5 mi) at the Saskatchewan border reducing to 1.6 kilometres (1 mi) on the western edge. The Clearwater River from the Alberta-Saskatchewan border to Fort McMurray was designated a Canadian Heritage River in 2004.

== Ecology ==
The park is part of the boreal forest of Canada and is within the Central Mixedwood Natural Subregion. The region has characteristically short, warm summers and long, cold winters. The landscape is typically aspen, mixedwood and white spruce forests. The Wildland Park and the Ecological Reserve together cover both sides of the river valley where the Clearwater River has eroded into the underlying limestone and dolomite. Erosion has created karst features such as "stacks, gullies, fissures, and caves". Cold mineral springs supply water to wetlands east of the falls. Flora and fauna include more than 130 bird, 4 bat, 14 furbearer, 6 carnivore, 3 ungulate, 3 amphibian, and 1 snake species. Rare plants in the reserve include green spleenwort, purple cliff brake and Robert's fern.

== Activities ==
The park is very remote, and access is only via canoe, jetboat, and floatplane. Authorization is required to land in the park. The park has no developed facilities so only backcountry camping and hiking are available. Hunting is allowed with proper permits.

== See also ==
- List of Alberta provincial parks
- List of Canadian provincial parks
