= Brûlé Lake (Alberta) =

Lake in Alberta, Canada

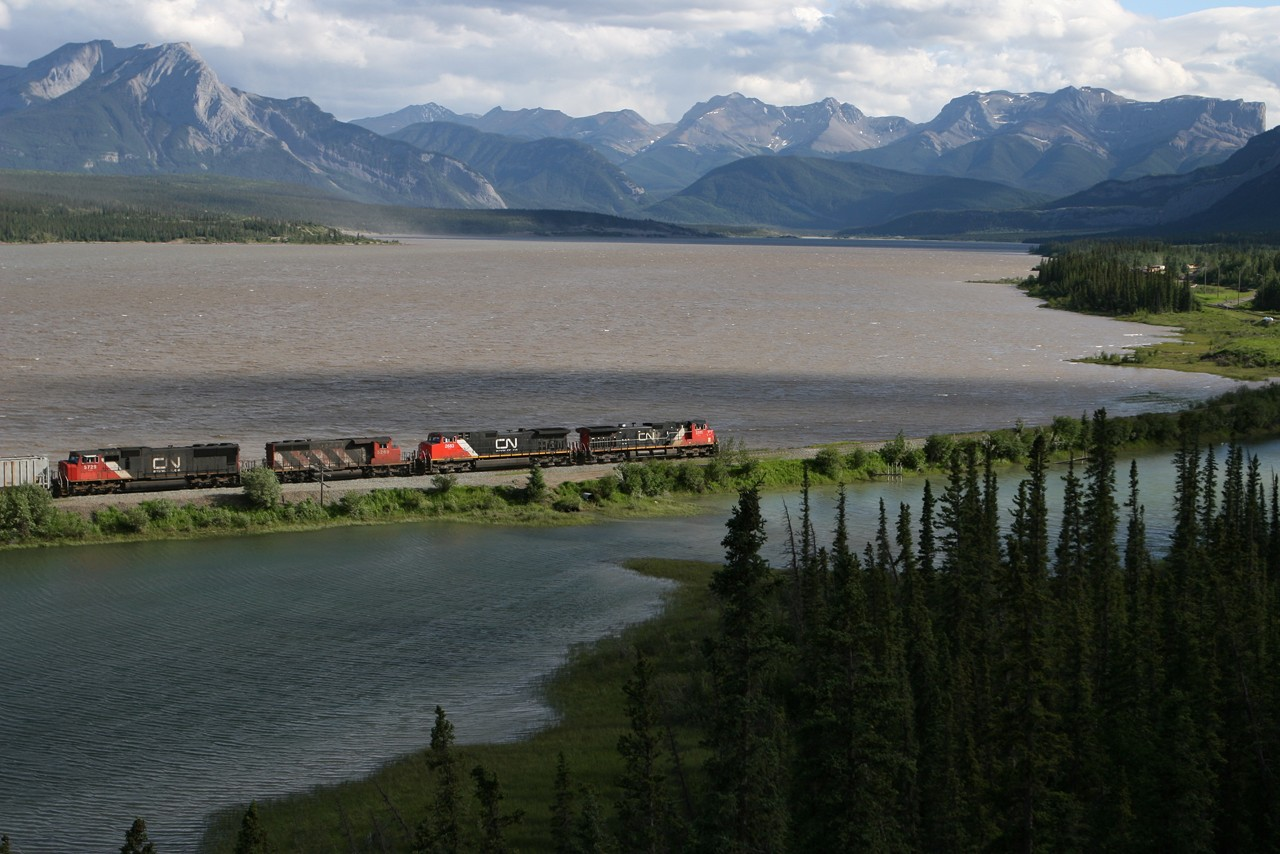
- West bound train at Brûlé Lake, Alberta

- Location within Alberta
- Location: Yellowhead County, Alberta
- Coordinates: 53°17′N 117°51′W
- Primary inflows: Athabasca River
- Primary outflows: Athabasca River
- Basin countries: Canada
- Max. length: 10 km (6.2 mi)
- Max. width: 2 km (1.2 mi)
- Surface area: 14.5 km^{2} (5.6 sq mi)
- Surface elevation: 984 m (3,228 ft)

Brûlé Lake (also given as Brule Lake) is a lake in western Alberta, Canada. It is formed along the Athabasca River, at the boundary of Jasper National Park and 30 km west of Hinton. According to one tradition, the lake was named for a burnt (French: brûlé) tract of woods near the site.

== Geography ==
The lake lies at an elevation of 984 m, is 10 km long, and has a maximum width of 2 km. The total water area is 14.5 km^{2}. Brûlé Lake is a widening of the Athabasca River at the foot of the Boule Range. Its inlet is at its southern tip, near where the Fiddle River enters. Solomon Creek joins the Athabasca River at the northern end, Brûlé Lake's mouth.

On the west side, Brown, Supply, Scovil, and Claywood creeks drain into the lake. The main line of the Canadian National Railway—which is also used by Via Rail's Canadian passenger train—follows the western side of the lake. Rock Lake-Solmon Creek Wildland Provincial Park meets the railway near the southwest lake shore. The hamlet of Brule is near the northwest shore.

The Grand Trunk Pacific Railway's abandoned grade is on the east shore, passing through the Brule Sand Dunes and the Brule Lake Public Land Use Zone. The Yellowhead Highway runs further east.

== History ==
In late 1810 on his first trip over Athabasca Pass, North West Company cartographer David Thompson's party found what they took to be Iroquois huts on the shore of a lake in the area, likely Brûlé. In 1813, François Decoigne built a supply depot on Brûlé Lake, from which a handful of North West Company employees traded for furs and kept horses to facilitate trips into present day British Columbia. It became known as Jasper's House after its 1817 manager, Jasper Hawse. The company moved it further upriver to the north end of Jasper Lake around 1830.

== Recreation ==
The Brûlé Lake sand dunes are a popular place for all-terrain vehicle driving.

== See also ==
- Lakes of Alberta
