= Antelope Hill Provincial Park =

Provincial park in Alberta, Canada

- Location within Alberta
- Interactive map of Antelope Hill Provincial Park
- Location: Alberta, Canada
- Nearest city: Hanna
- Coordinates: 51.722°N 111.937°W
- Area: 380 ha (940 acres)
- Established: December 4, 2014
- Governing body: Alberta Tourism, Parks and Recreation

Antelope Hill Provincial Park is a provincial park in central Alberta, Canada. It is located within Special Area No. 2 north of the Town of Hanna and east of Dowling Lake.

== History ==
Antelope Hill was officially designated as a provincial park by an order in council on December 4, 2014. The designation involved the protection of 380 ha (940 acres) of land that was donated to the Province of Alberta by Gottlob Schmidt.

== Fauna ==
The park is home to animals such as the thirteen-lined ground squirrel, deer, red fox, porcupine, and elk. Birds such as the white-faced ibis, the American white pelican, and the Sprague's pipit also live at Antelope Hill.
