= Hilliard's Bay Provincial Park =

Provincial park in Alberta, Canada

- Location within Alberta
- Interactive map of Hilliard's Bay Provincial Park
- Location: Big Lakes County, Alberta Canada
- Nearest city: High Prairie
- Coordinates: 55°30′13″N 115°58′46″W
- Area: 24.8 km^{2} (9.6 sq mi)
- Established: October 24, 1978
- Governing body: Alberta Tourism, Parks and Recreation

Hilliard's Bay Provincial Park is a provincial park in Alberta, Canada. It is located 40 km (25 mi) from High Prairie, on the north-western shore of Lesser Slave Lake in northern Alberta.

The park is situated at an elevation of 590 m (1,940 ft) and has a surface of 24.8 km^{2} (9.6 sq mi). It was established on October 24, 1978, and is maintained by Alberta Tourism, Parks and Recreation.

== Amenities ==
The park has an overnight camping ground at Hilliard's Bay, which includes a boat launch site and playgrounds, and three day use areas, all powered.

== Activities ==
The following activities are available in the park:

- Beach activities
- Camping
- Canoeing/kayaking
- Fishing
- Group camping
- Hiking - front country
- Horseshoes
- Ice fishing
- Power boating
- Sailing
- Swimming
- Water-skiing
- Windsurfing

== See also ==
- List of provincial parks in Alberta
- List of Canadian provincial parks
- List of Canadian national parks
