= Bighorn Wildland Provincial Park =

Provincial park in Alberta, Canada

Bighorn Wildland Provincial Park is a proposed provincial park that would be situated near Rocky Mountain House, Alberta, Canada. It would be part of the Alberta Provincial Parks system and governed by Alberta Tourism, Parks and Recreation under Alberta Environment and Parks. After the 2019 Alberta election, the new United Conservative government announced the plan would not go ahead.

== Proposed provincial park ==
Alberta's provincial government under Premier Rachel Notley is proposing the new park as one way among many of "diversifying Alberta's economy through tourism. The proposed area to be set aside near Rocky Mountain House is "about the size of Rhode Island" and is the largest of four proposals for "new or expanded" parks. (Note: According to a January 7, 2019 The Globe and Mail article, with the oil industry in the early stages of a recovery following x years of a deep downturn, the Alberta provincial deficit is "projected at $8.8-billion".) "In November, Alberta's NDP proposed four provincial parks, including the Bighorn Wildland Provincial Park, plus four provincial recreation areas and a new public-land-use zone in the area on the eastern slopes of the Rocky Mountains, west of Nordegg."

The proposed region, situated between Banff National Park and Jasper National Park, would provide a vast and critical wildlife corridor for numerous wildlife species, including sensitive species, such as bull trout—Alberta’s provincial fish, wolverine, and grizzly bears, that would extend from Yellowstone National Park in Wyoming in the south to the Yukon in Northern Canada. According to Lorne Fitch, who studied the bull trout for 50 years as a biologist with the fisheries, the bull trout is a "sentinel species" "whose abundance and distribution serve as an indicator of how well we have managed the landscape".

The headwaters of the North Saskatchewan River, the source of drinking water for the province's capital city, Edmonton, which is hundreds of kilometres to the east, is located in the proposed region.

The Canadian Parks and Wilderness Society (CPAWS) has indicated this region along with several others, as one that could "help Canada meet conservation targets under the United Nations Convention on Biological Diversity.

Consultations on the four proposed parks will end in February 2019. "In an open letter that Phillips posted on Facebook, she specifically expressed her disappointment at United Conservative Party MLA Jason Nixon's "inaccurate statements" and "misinformation."

"Two telephone town hall sessions will be scheduled so people in Drayton Valley and Red Deer can ask government officials questions about the proposal."

== Activities ==
The following activities may be available in the proposed park:Alberta Parks "Over five years, the province would spend $40 million on developing infrastructure for camping, hiking, paddling, snowmobile and off-highway vehicle use."

== Background ==
In 1974 former premier Peter Lougheed held the eastern slopes hearings, to begin a conversation with "ranchers, hunters and sportsmen" about protecting the Bighorn Backcountry. In the 1980s roadmaps were created then "quickly rescinded."

Since the 1990s, The Bighorn Heritage ATV Society, ATV riders, such as the Bighorn Heritage ATV Society and other recreational vehicles, have "fought restricted access to the area", which is "popular with quadders and snowmobilers".

In 1993 Harvey Locke began an essay entitled "Yellowstone to Yukon". It became the framework for one of Yellowstone to Yukon Conservation Initiative (Y2Y), a joint Canada–United States charitable organization that supports the creation of the wildlife corridor, one of "North Americas leading conservation partnerships".

Since 2002 with the creation of Alberta's Forests Act's "patchwork of land-use agreements", the area has been "protected by an access management plan."

In 2016, the Yellowstone to Yukon Conservation Initiative sponsored a survey that was contracted to NRG Research Group and the Praxis Group™ to poll Albertans' attitudes towards a new Bighorn Headwaters park. The report found that "There is strong support for establishing a park in the Bighorn. Over eighty percent (83%) of Edmonton residents and 68% of those living in communities and rural areas near the Bighorn support establishment of a park."

By 2017, the Y2Y project included "300 partner groups" and had "expanded its protected land into a 3,500-kilometre-long corridor that stretches from southern Wyoming to northern Yukon".

In January 2018, "Hops and Headwaters" in support of a campaign to protect the headwaters of the Bighorn Backcountry" was held in Edmonton. It was criticized for its alleged association with Y2Y and Canadian Parks and Wilderness Society (CPAWS), described by critics as a "foreign-funded" organizations meddling in the Alberta's affairs. (Note: Y2Y and CPAWS are non-profit organizations that "receive some of their funding from foundations located outside of Canada.")

In May 2018, the NDP government announced that Alberta was going to "create the largest protected area of boreal forest in the world by setting aside four new provincial parks and expanding another along its northeastern borders".

With the announcement of the potential creation of Bighorn Wildland Provincial Park, concerns were raised that the park would lead to "encouraging more tourism, development of more campsites, cabins, tourist spots, tourist accommodations..."

In September 2018 concerns were raised that, "existing mineral leases would be phased out, commercial development would be banned in the park, cattle grazing allotments would not be granted and motorized recreation vehicles would be prohibited in critical wildlife zones. Camping and trail access would also be restricted." According to the November 2018 Alberta Parks document, existing activities and agreements would be honoured and continue, such as such as petroleum and natural gas agreements, grazing allocations, hunting and trapping, and the use of motorized recreation vehicles (OHV) on designated trails. The "plan calls for areas with a variety of permitted activities, including off-highway vehicles and hunting".

According to a January 7, 2019 article in The Globe and Mail, some residents of Rocky Mountain House, a town of 7,000, led by United Conservative Party (UCP) Member of the Legislative Assembly of Alberta (MLA) for Rimbey-Rocky Mountain House-Sundre, Jason Nixon, oppose the creation of the park. Nixon said that the plan is a "foreign-funded plot to wall off the back country to Albertans who call the region home". "Alberta Environment and Parks Minister Shannon Phillips issued a statement Saturday announcing the cancellation of upcoming public information sessions in Drayton Valley, Edmonton, Red Deer and Sundre."

== See also ==
- List of Alberta Provincial Parks
- Wildlife of the Rocky Mountains
