= Jasper House =

National Historic Site in Alberta, Canada

Coordinates: 53.146807°N 117.984195°W

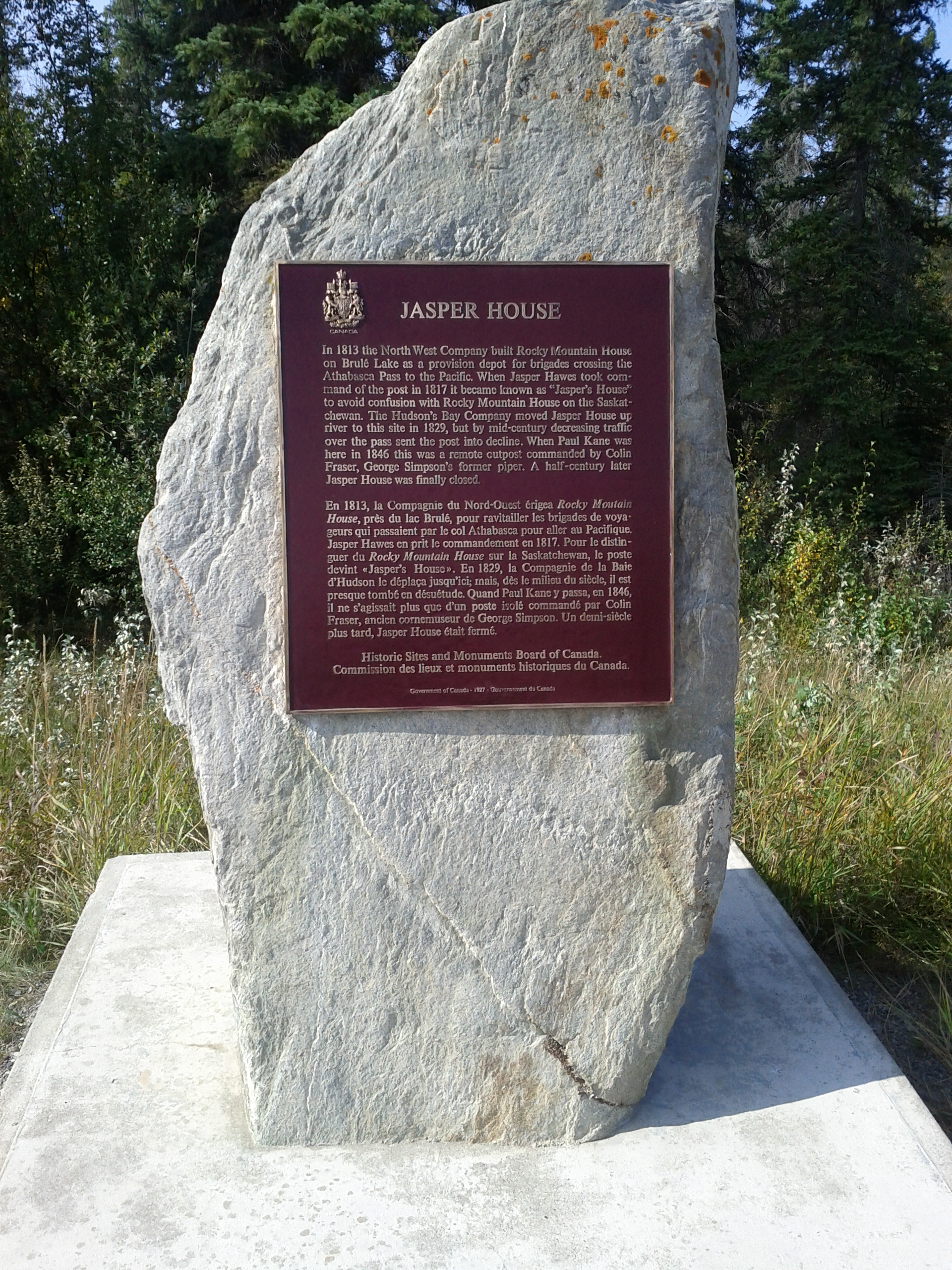
- Jasper House marker
- Location: Jasper, Alberta, Alberta, canada
- Built: 1830
- Governing body: Parks Canada
- Website: Parks Canada page

National Historic Site of Canada
- Designated: 1924

Jasper House National Historic Site, in Jasper National Park, Alberta, is the second site of a trading post on the Athabasca River that functioned from 1813 to 1884 as a major staging and supply post for travel through the Canadian Rockies.

The post was originally named Rocky Mountain House, but was renamed to avoid confusion with the Rocky Mountain House trading post on the North Saskatchewan River, becoming "Jasper's House" after the postmaster, Jasper Hawes, who operated the post from 1815 or 1817 to 1821. The first location was on the west shore of Brûlé Lake. The second Jasper House was established at the northern end of Jasper Lake in 1830, primarily serving travellers crossing Yellowhead Pass or Athabasca Pass.

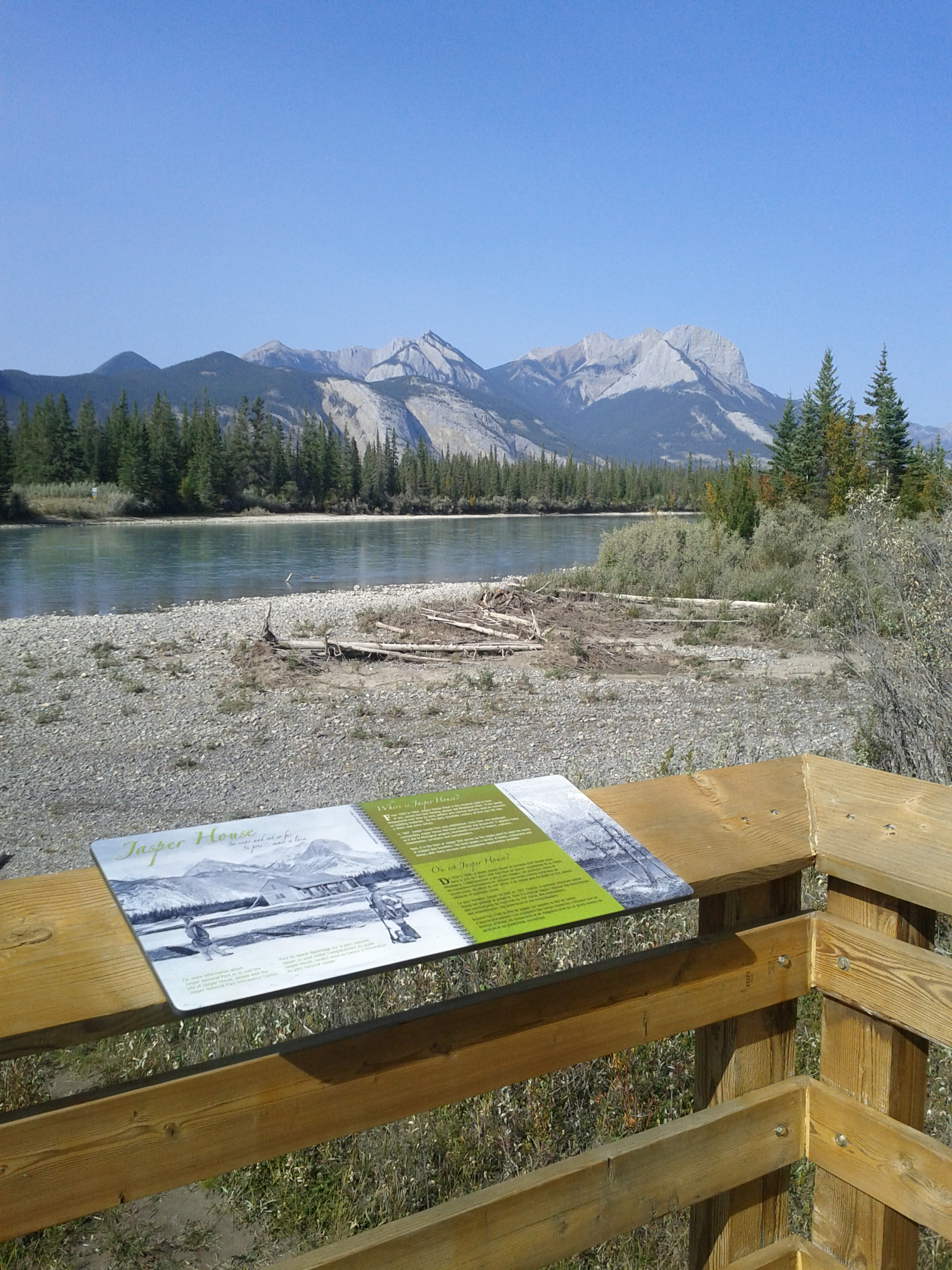
Jasper House overlook

The site operated until 1853, and was occasionally used until 1858 when it was reopened seasonally by Henry John Moberly, who operated it into the 1860s. The post was officially closed in 1884 after years of inactivity. From 1891 or 1892 to 1894 the house was used by miner Lewis Swift. The building was destroyed in 1909 when its lumber was used to make a raft by surveyors for the Grand Trunk Pacific Railway. Apart from a small cemetery, no significant ruins remain. It was designated a national historic site in 1924, and is marked by a commemorative stone and plaque.
