= Eagle Point Provincial Park =

Provincial park in Alberta, Canada

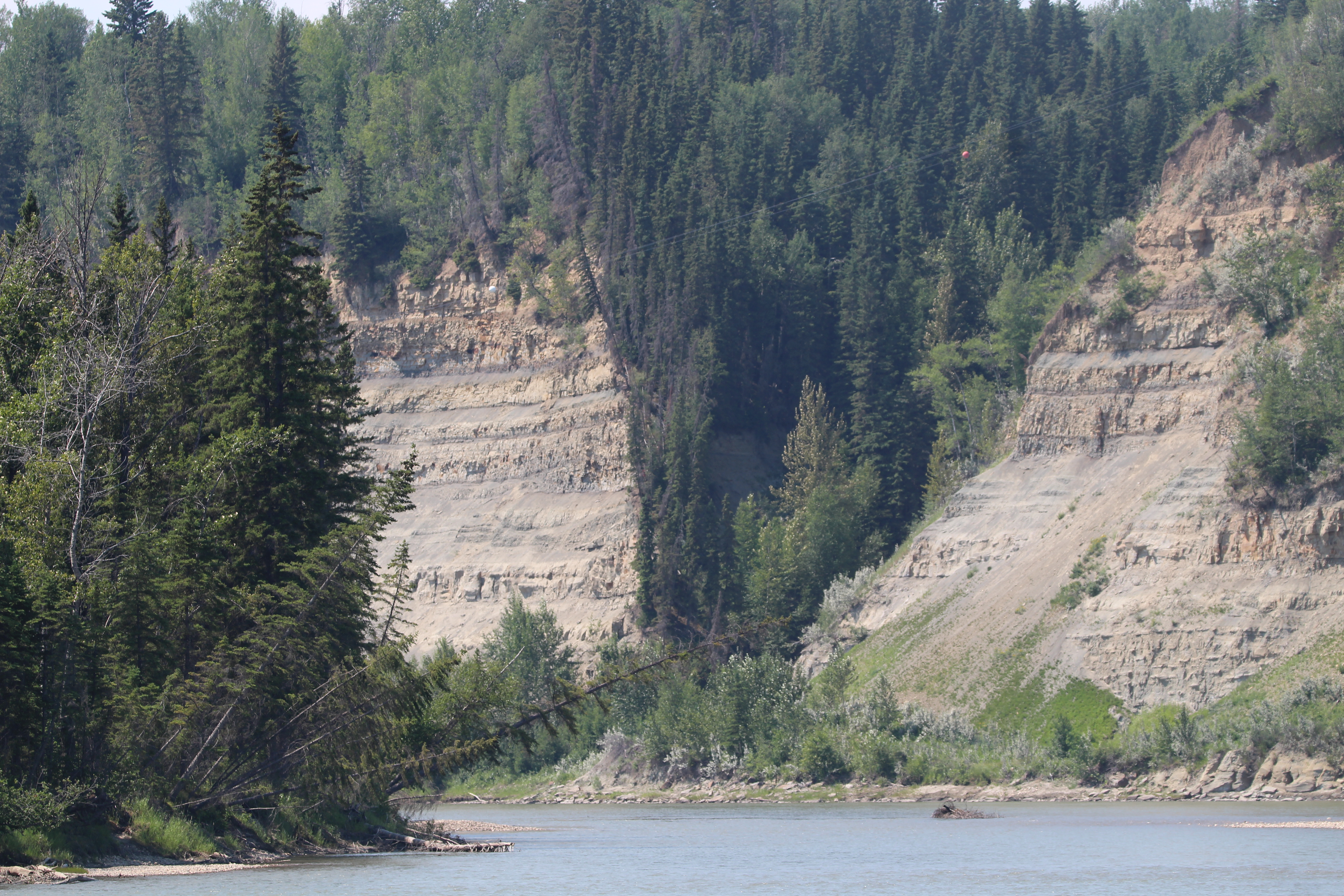
- North Saskatchewan River in Eagle Point Provincial Park

- Location within Alberta
- Interactive map of Eagle Point Provincial Park
- Location: Alberta Canada
- Nearest city: Drayton Valley
- Coordinates: 53.244547°N 114.874352°W
- Area: 1,962 ha (4,850 acres)
- Established: August 29, 2007
- Governing body: Alberta Tourism, Parks and Recreation

Eagle Point Provincial Park is a provincial park in central Alberta, Canada. It is located along the banks of the North Saskatchewan River within Brazeau County to the east and northeast of the Town of Drayton Valley. Recreation in Eagle Point Provincial Park include, Canoeing, Biking, Hiking, and Fishing. Animals within the park include Pine Martens, River Otters, North American beaver, American Black Bear, Belted Kingfisher, Osprey, Great Grey Owl, and Mule Deer.

Eagle Point was officially designated as a provincial park by an order in council on August 29, 2007. The designation involved the protection of 1,962 ha (4,850 acres) of land.
