= Alberta Parks =

Agency overview
- Formed: 1930; 96 years ago
- Jurisdiction: Alberta
- Headquarters: 9820 - 106 Street, Edmonton, Alberta T5K 2J6; 53°32′10″N 113°30′13″W
- Parent department: Alberta Forestry Parks and Tourism
- Website: albertaparks.ca

Map
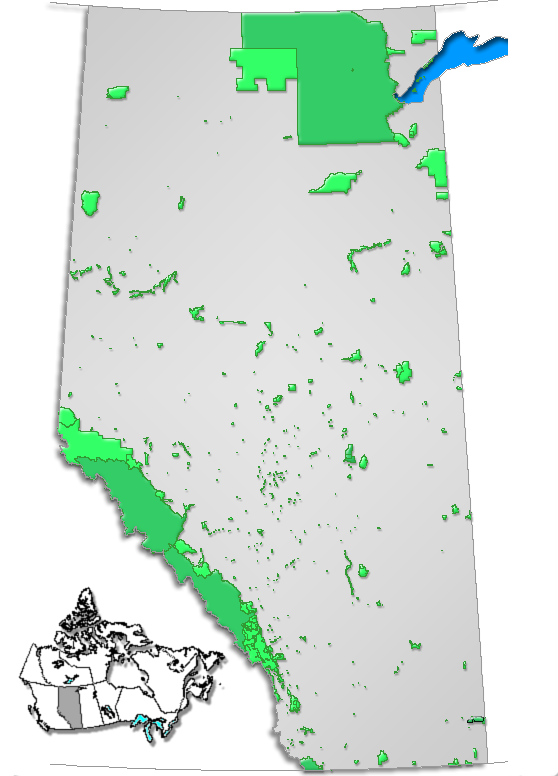
- Map of provincial parks and protected areas in Alberta

Alberta Parks is a division of the Ministry of Forestry and Parks of the Government of Alberta which is responsible for managing Alberta's provincial parks and protected areas.

== History ==
Alberta's system of provincial parks began with the striking of a committee on parks by then Premier J. E. Brownlee in 1929. This led to the passage of the Provincial Parks and Protected Areas Act in 1930 and the formation of the Provincial Board of Management to oversee the system. The first provincial parks were Aspen Beach Provincial Park, established in 1932, followed by Gooseberry Lake, Park Lake, Sylvan Lake and Saskatoon Island later that same year. However further development of the system was halted during the Great Depression and during the Second World War.

Major changes began in 1950 with the passage of a new Parks Act, the transferring of responsibilities for parks to the Department of Lands and Forests, and the creation of a new three-person Parks Board. A major budget increase in 1952-53 saw the hiring of the first full-time parks staff. The parks system expanded rapidly with 46 new parks established between 1951 and 1971, focused mostly on recreational campgrounds near lakes. As well in 1959 the Provincial Parks Branch was established, headed by a Provincial Parks Commissioner, who reported to the parks board. Also in 1950 the Parks Branch began to establish provincial historic sites.

In addition to new provincial parks proper, other park-like areas were established by other government departments: the Department of Highways and Transport had network of roadside campgrounds for the new wave of automotive tourists and the Alberta Forest Service had a network of recreation areas in forested regions to divert backcountry camping into fewer site, so they could be well monitored and regulated, and environmental impacts localized to just a few places. After the late 1950s the focus of Alberta's parks policy began to shift from recreation to wilderness preservation. Willmore Wilderness Park was created in 1959 outside of the parks system under separate legislation to preserve it as a hunting and trapping ground and protect it from industrial development. The Parks Act was amended in 1964 to allow for the creation of wilderness areas and natural areas as well as parks, and this was reinforced by the Wilderness Areas Act of 1971.

A major report on parks was tabled in the legislature in 1973 by the Honourable Allan Warrack, Minister of Lands and Forests, which concluded that the park system was inadequate, more park lands were needed, existing parks were badly in need of upgrading, there were serious resource development conflicts in some parks, and Albertans in metropolitan centres (in particular seniors and disadvantaged Albertans) lacked opportunities to visit parks. A major budget expansion followed and many new parks were created at this time. In 1975 when the Department of Lands and Forests was dissolved, responsibly for parks, was transferred to the new Department of Recreation, Parks, and Wildlife. In addition the Environment Department began creating campground and picnic areas on lakes and reservoirs to limit erosion and other environmental impacts of recreation. Finally, in the early 1990s all of Alberta's parks and protected areas were consolidated under the management of Alberta Parks.

== Statistics ==
As of 2014 the parks system included:

		Acres	Hectares
3	Wilderness Areas	249,550	101,000
15	Ecological Reserves	66,330	26,800
32	Wildland Provincial Parks	4,278,340	1,731,400
	Willmore Wilderness Park	1,135,870	459,700
75	Provincial Parks	546,050	221,000
208	Provincial Recreation Areas	217,180	87,900
2	Heritage Rangelands	29,680	12,000
139	Natural Areas	321,090	129,900
for a total of 475 sites covering		6,844,090	2,769,700

In addition 10 sites representing 3,584 acres (1,450 ha) are controlled by Alberta Parks but are not (yet) designated as part of a park or protected area.

== See also ==
- BC Parks
