= Mid-Canada Boreal Plains Forests =

Taiga ecoregion of western Canada

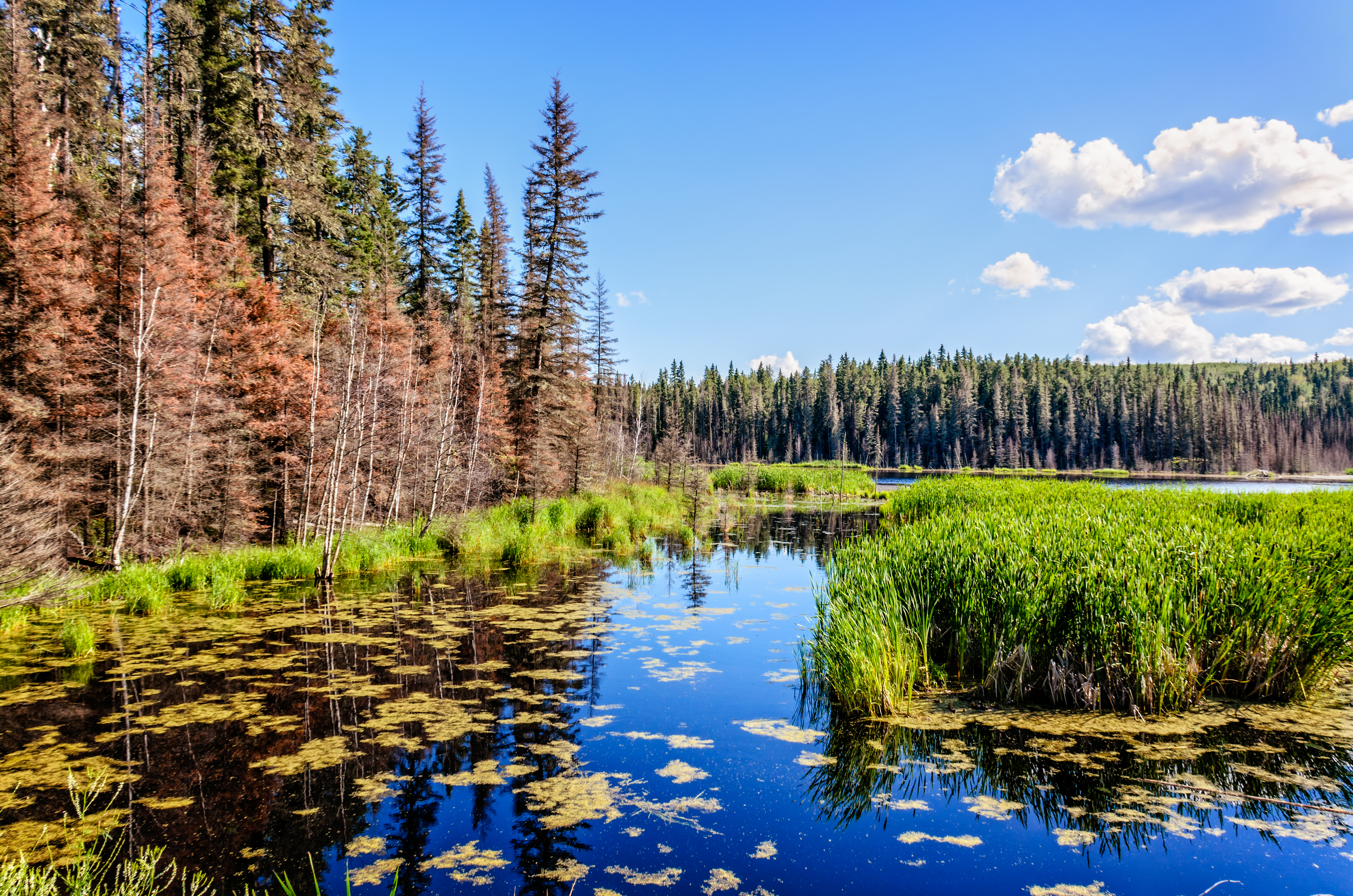
- Forests of the Prince Albert National Park, Saskatchewan

Ecology
- Realm: Nearctic
- Biome: Boreal forests/taiga
- Borders: List: Alberta-British Columbia foothills forests; Canadian aspen forests and parklands; Midwestern Canadian Shield forests; Muskwa-Slave Lake forests; Northern Canadian Shield taiga
- Bird species: 183
- Mammal species: 55

Geography
- Area: 568,470 km^{2} (219,490 mi^{2})
- Country: Canada
- Provinces: Alberta; Manitoba; Northwest Territories; Saskatchewan

Conservation
- Conservation status: Vulnerable
- Habitat loss: 0.4%
- Protected: 15.5%

The Mid-Canada Boreal Plains Forests is a taiga ecoregion of Western Canada, designated by One Earth. It was previously defined as the Mid-Continental Canadian Forests by the World Wildlife Fund (WWF) categorization system, before it was modified by One Earth, the successor to WWF.

== Setting ==
This ecoregion extends from south of the Great Slave Lake in the Northwest Territories through most of northeastern Alberta, central Saskatchewan and parts of west-central Manitoba and consists of three main areas: the Slave River basin in northeastern Alberta, the lowlands of the northern Manitoba plain, and the uplands south of the Canadian Shield from north-central Alberta to southwestern Manitoba. This is a mixed area of lowlands and mountains up to 800m high, including areas of wetland and peat bog and mountain lakes and ponds. The area has a subhumid mid-boreal ecoclimate with short summers (average temperature 14°C) and long, cold winters (ave. -15°C) and patches of permafrost in the lowlands.

== Flora ==
These forests, like so much of Canada at this latitude, are a mixture of conifers and deciduous trees including quaking aspen (Populus tremuloides), balsam poplar (Populus balsamifera), white spruce (Picea glauca), paper birch (Betula papyrifera), black spruce (Picea mariana), jack pine (Pinus banksiana) and balsam fir (Abies balsamea).

== Fauna ==
Wildlife of the area includes moose (Alces alces), American black bear (Ursus americanus), wolf (Canis lupus), Canada lynx (Lynx canadensis), white-tailed deer (Odocoileus virginianus), elk (Cervus canadensis), North American beaver (Castor canadensis), muskrat (Ondatra zibethicus), snowshoe hare (Lepus americanus). The plain to the south of the lake is home to moose, coyote (Canis latrans), and eastern cottontail (Sylvilagus floridanus) as well. Wood Buffalo National Park on the Slave River is the largest national park in Canada and home to the world's largest herd of American bison (Bison bison).

Birds include ducks, geese, American white pelican (Pelecanus erythrorhynchos), sandhill crane (Grus canadensis), ruffed grouse (Bonasa umbellus) and common loon (Gavia immer) The wetlands of the region, such as Cumberland Lake, are an important refuge for migratory birds and include the most important breeding populations of the endangered whooping crane in North America.

== Threats and preservation ==
Half of the natural forest remains intact, the other half having been removed by extensive logging, oil and gas exploration and mining. Blocks of intact forest include Wood Buffalo Park, the areas around Cold Lake/Primrose Lake and Doré Lake, Prince Albert National Park, to the north of Cumberland Lake, Riding Mountain National Park, Porcupine Hills, Duck Mountain Provincial Park (Manitoba), Duck Mountain Provincial Park (Saskatchewan) (near the town of Kamsack) and the Peace–Athabasca Delta on the Slave River. Other protected areas include Clearwater River (Saskatchewan), Meadow Lake Provincial Park (near Goodsoil, Saskatchewan) and Narrow Hills Provincial Park.

== See also ==
- List of ecoregions in Canada (WWF)
- Mid-Canada Boreal Plains Forests One Earth
