= Ecodistrict =

Environmental planning

An ecodistrict or eco-district (from "ecological" and "district") is a neighborhood, urban area, or region whose urban planning aims to integrate objectives of sustainable development and social equity, and to reduce the district's ecological footprint. The notion of an "ecodistrict" insists on the consideration of all environmental issues, and heavily emphasizes a collaborative process.

In order to design ecodistricts, one needs to completely redesign their energy system plans. The usage of photovoltaic panels and electric vehicles is common.

== Examples ==
Ecodistricts can be found in metropolises such as :

- Stockholm (Hammarby Sjöstad) (Sweden)
- Hanover (Germany)
- Marseille (Euroméditerranée) (France)
- Bordeaux (Ginko) (France)
- Freiburg im Breisgau (Vauban, Freiburg) (Germany)
- Malmö (BO01) (Sweden)
- London (BedZED) (United Kingdom)
- Grenoble (De Bonne and Blanche Monier) (France)
- Dongtan (China)
- EVA Lanxmeer (Netherlands)
- Amsterdam-Noord (Netherlands)
- Jono district low-carbon project (Kitakyushu, Japan)
- Frequel-Fontarabie (Paris, France)
- Atlanta (Midtown, Atlanta Georgia) (United States)
- Energy Hub Project – Tweewaters Leuven (Belgium)
- Etna, PA named first ever certified EcoDistrict in 2019 (Etna, Pennsylvania)
- Millvale, PA and Sharpsburg, PA were 2nd & 3rd certified EcoDistricts; have collaborated with Etna to form Triboro Ecodistrict
- Lloyd EcoDistrict, Portland, Oregon – operated as an ecodistrict since 2011
- ZAC de Bonne in Grenoble (France)

== See also ==
- Ecological footprint
- Ecological debt
- Ecovillage
- Green building
- Green retrofit
- Peri-urbanisation
- Sustainable city
- Sustainable design
- Sustainable transport
- Transition town
- Urban agriculture
- Urban ecology
- Urban forest
- Urban green space
- Urban vitality
- Vertical farming
