= Ecoprovince =

Biogeographic unit

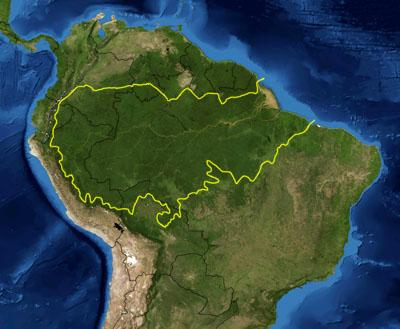
This is a map location of the Amazon Basin. The yellow line encloses Amazon Basin as delineated by the World Wide Fund for Nature. National boundaries are shown in black.

An ecoprovince is a biogeographic unit smaller than an ecozone that contains one or more ecoregions. According to Demarchi (1996), an ecoprovince encompasses areas of uniform climate, geological history and physiography (i.e. mountain ranges, large valleys, plateaus). Their size and broad internal uniformity make them ideal units for the implementation of natural resource policies.

== See also ==
- Bioregion
- Ecological land classification
- Ecology terminology
