= List of Canadian protected areas =

== Location map by province and territory ==
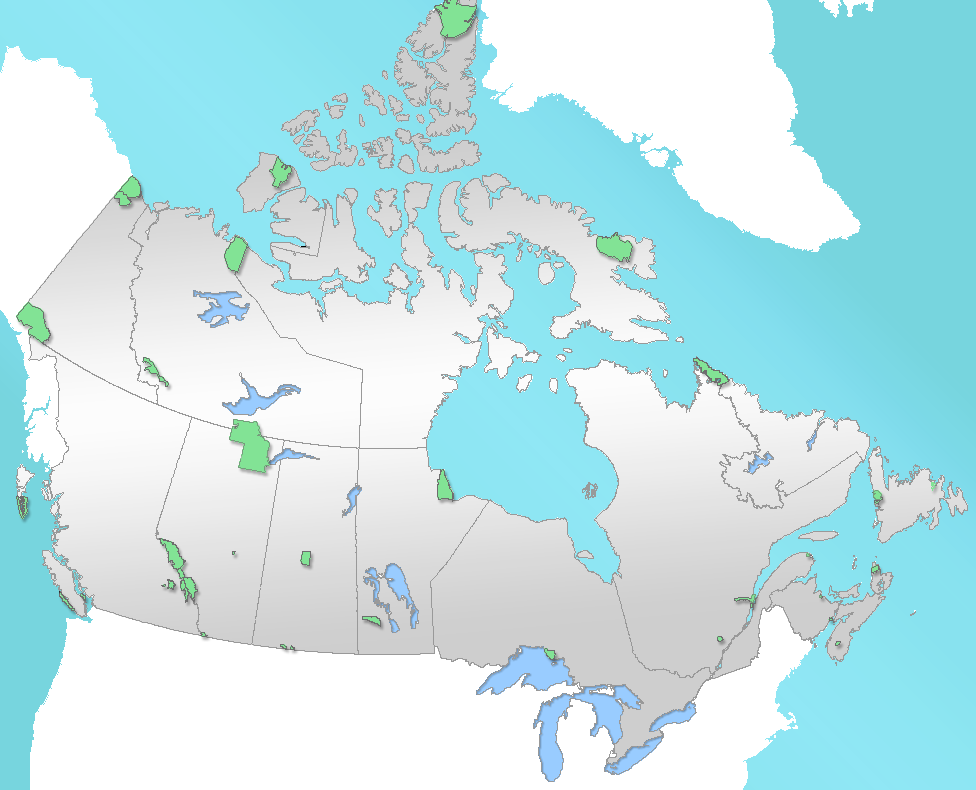
Protected areas by provinces and territories of Canada

== Alberta ==
Some protected areas are under the jurisdiction of the Ministry of Environment and Protected Areas. Provincial parks are administered by Alberta Parks, under the Ministry of Forestry and Parks.

== British Columbia ==
Protected areas in British Columbia are under the jurisdiction of the Ministry of Environment and Parks.

== Manitoba ==
Protected areas in Manitoba are under the jurisdiction of Environment and Climate Change.

== New Brunswick ==
Similar to Alberta, the province places protected natural areas under the jurisdiction of Forestry & Conservation (within the Natural Resources and Energy Development department). New Brunswick's provincial parks, specifically, are the responsibility of Tourism, Heritage and Culture.

== Newfoundland and Labrador ==
Protected areas in Newfoundland and Labrador are the responsibility of the Ministry of Environment, Conservation and Climate Change.

== Northwest Territories (NWT) ==
NWT organizes protected areas within a conservation network under Conservation, Assessment and Monitoring (part of Environment and Climate Change). The network includes established and pending Indigenous protected areas.

== Nova Scotia ==
Nova Scotia's protected areas are under the Protected Areas branch of Nova Scotia Environment and Labour. The provincial park system is under Natural Resources.

== Nunavut ==
Nunavut's protected areas are under Nunavut Ministry of Environment.

== Ontario ==
Ontario Parks is responsible for provincial parks and protected areas in Ontario.

== Prince Edward Island ==
Protected areas in Prince Edward Island are the responsibility of the Ministry of Tourism and Culture.

== Quebec ==
Provincial parks (referred to as national parks) and protected areas in Quebec are managed by the Société des établissements de plein air du Québec under the Ministry of Sustainable Development, Environment and Parks.

== Saskatchewan ==
Provincial parks and protected areas in Saskatchewan are under the responsibility of Saskatchewan Parks under the Ministry of Tourism, Parks, Culture and Sport.

== Yukon ==
Yukon's territorial parks and protected areas are maintained by the Parks Branch of the Yukon Territory Ministry of Environment

== See also ==
- List of National Parks of Canada
- Urban parks in Canada
- Protected areas of Canada
- National Wildlife Area
- Crown land
