= Alberta Environment and Protected Areas =

Ministry in Alberta, Canada

Environment and Parks
Agency overview
- Jurisdiction: Province of Alberta
- Agency executive: Grant Hunter (January 2, 2026), Minister
- Parent agency: Executive Council of Alberta
- Child agencies: Alberta Recycling Management Authority; Alberta Used Oil Management Association; Beverage Container Management Board; Climate Change and Emissions Management Fund; Environmental Appeals Board; Environmental Protection and Enhancement Fund; Land Compensation Board; Land Stewardship Fund; Land Use Secretariat; Natural Resources Conservation Board; Surface Rights Board
- Website: Official ESRD Website

The Ministry of Environment and Protected Areas of Alberta (also commonly called Alberta Environment and Protected Areas) is the Alberta provincial ministry of the Executive Council of Alberta responsible for environmental issues and policy as well as some, but not all, parks and protected areas in Alberta.

== Ministers ==
The first Minister of the Environment was Jim Henderson, appointed by Premier Harry Strom in 1971. He was succeeded by William Yurko from 1971 to 1977. Ian Reid was the minister in 1988 and 1989 Ralph Klein was the minister from 1989 to 1992. The ministry was renamed Environment and Parks on May 24, 2015. On June 28, 2022, Whitney Issik was appointed Environment and Parks Minister, replacing Jason Nixon. On June 9, 2023, Rebecca Schulz was sworn in as Minister of Environment and Protected Areas. When Schulz announced her plan to retire from the legislature, Grant Hunter took over the ministry on January 2, 2026.

== Acts ==
- Natural Resources Conservation Board Act (NRCBA)

"The purpose of this Act is to provide for an impartial process to review projects that will or may affect the natural resources of Alberta in order to determine whether, in the Board’s opinion, projects are in the public interest, having regard to the social and economic effects of the projects and the effect of the projects on the environment."

— Government of Alberta 2000, 2013

Natural resource refers to "the subsurface, land surface, water, fauna and flora resources of Alberta, but does not include an energy resource as defined in the Responsible Energy Development Act." Environmental impact assessment (EIS) reports are ordered under the Environmental Protection and Enhancement Act. Industrial mineral projects are defined in the Mines and Minerals Act.

- Alberta Land Stewardship Act
- Environmental Protection and Enhancement Act
- Public Lands Act: Land Stewardship and Fund Regulation

== Agencies ==
Environment and Parks as a ministry of the Government of Alberta, consists of Alberta Recycling Management Authority, Alberta Used Oil Management Association, Beverage Container Management Board, Climate Change and Emissions Management Fund, Environmental Appeals Board, [Environmental Protection and Enhancement Fund], Land Compensation Board, [Land Stewardship Fund], Land Use Secretariat, Natural Resources Conservation Board, Surface Rights Board.

=== Alberta Recycling Management Authority ===
The Alberta Recycling Management Authority, established in 1992, a not-for-profit association that manages Alberta's recycling program which includes recycling of tires, paints and electronics. Alberta Recycling Management Authority reports to the Minister of Alberta Environment.

=== Alberta Used Oil Management Association ===
Alberta Used Oil Management Association (AUOMA) manages the "Alberta province-wide Recycling Program for Used Oil, Used Oil Filters and Plastic Oil Containers."

=== Beverage Container Management Board ===
Beverage Container Management Board (BCMB), a not-for-profit association, was established in 1997 under the Beverage Container Recycling Regulation section of the Environmental Protection and Enhancement Act.

=== The Climate Change and Emissions Management Fund ===
Climate Change and Emissions Management Corporation (CCEMC) established in 2009 by the Province of Alberta, is an independent organization that establishes or participates in "funding initiatives that reduce GHG emissions or improve our ability to adapt to climate change."

In April 2007, Alberta became the first jurisdiction in North America to pass climate-change legislation requiring large emitters to reduce greenhouse gas (GHG) emissions. The Climate Change and Emissions Management Corporation (CCEMC) was created in 2009 to be a key part of Alberta’s climate change strategy and movement toward a stronger and more diverse lower-carbon economy.

— CCEMC

CCEMC is aligned with and builds on Alberta's 2008 Climate Change Strategy and Carbon Capture and Storage Development Council, and "seeks to complement decisions made on large carbon capture and storage (CCS) projects."

In December 2014 Environment Minister Kyle Fawcett attended the 2014 United Nations Climate Change Conference in Lima, Peru where conference delegates held negotiations towards a global climate agreement with the reduction of greenhouse gas emissions (GHGs) as the overarching goal. In line with this, Fawcett described how his key goal was to build networks with other "sub-national jurisdictions", Ontario, Quebec and British Columbia and California — to potentially work on new agreements on carbon offset — across provincial and national borders as part of the province's climate change framework.

=== Environmental Protection and Enhancement Fund ===
The Environmental Protection Security Fund operates under the Environment Protection and Enhancement Act. The Environmental Protection Security Fund collects for activities such as "coal and oil sands, mining operations, landfills, hazardous waste, recyclable projects, quarry activities, waste management facilities, sand and gravel operations and metal production plants", and holds security deposits to "assure satisfactory land reclamation will be carried out according to the Environment Protection and Enhancement Act." When reclamation is completed partial refunds or credits may be made. Alberta's Treasurer administers the Environmental Protection and Enhancement Fund as part of the Consolidated Cash Investment Trust Fund. By March 2012 Fund total cash deposits (with interest), bonds and guarantees were $1,314,392,292 and by March 2013 they were $1,503,038,440.

According to the Environment and Parks (then named Environment and Sustainable Resource Development) 2012-2013 report, by 31 March 2014, the only activities that had contributed only in guarantees with no cash or securities collected were those engaged in oil sands development. For example, the Fund had collected $11,647,586.67 in cash and $340,836,116 in guarantees from companies engaged in coal development activities and no cash but $967,585,501.63 in guarantees from companies engaged in oil sands development activities.

=== Land Compensation Board ===
Moved to Municipal Affairs in 2018.

=== Land Stewardship Fund ===
The Alberta Land Stewardship Fund, established in 2010 under the Alberta Land Stewardship Act, and the Alberta Land Trust Grant Program "focuses on conserving ecologically important areas to prevent habitat fragmentation, maintain biodiversity and preserve native landscapes."

=== Natural Resources Conservation Board ===
The Natural Resources Conservation Board (NRCB), an arms-length agency of the Government of Alberta that reports to Alberta Environment, was established in 1991 under the Natural Resources Conservation Board Act (NRCBA). The NRBC reviews "proposed non-energy natural resource projects."

=== Surface Rights Board ===
Moved to Municipal Affairs in 2018.

== Alberta Environment and Sustainable Resource Development (ESRD), AER and ERCB ==
In March 2014 the Alberta Energy Regulator (AER) became the single regulator for energy development in Alberta taking over enforcement of environmental laws and issues including environmental and water permits for energy developments, formerly responsibilities of Alberta Environment and Sustainable Resource Development. Prior to the establishment of the AER, an arms-length corporation, Alberta Environment and the now-defunct Energy Resources Conservation Board conducted investigations separately, but, with the creation of a single regulatory body for energy developments, the Alberta Energy Regulator now conducts investigations and inspections to ensure compliance with all regulatory, environmental, and safety requirements.

== Related agencies ==
Environment and Parks played a significant role in the development of Alberta Innovates-Technology Futures (AITF) which brings together academics, governments and industry to foster innovation. The AITF is a government research agency established in 2010 as a "Provincial Corporation operating under the authority of the Alberta Research and Innovation Act. AITF supports research and innovation activities targeting the development and growth of technology-based sectors in alignment with Government of Alberta priorities." The AITF, the Royal Alberta Museum, the University of Alberta, and the University of Calgary jointly run the Alberta Biodiversity Monitoring Institute (ABMI). ESRD consults ABMI reports in regards to enforcement of environmental laws. Data and information on air, water, biodiversity and toxicology used in Alberta Biodiversity Monitoring Institute (ABMI) report was "partially funded through the Joint Oil Sands Monitoring (JOSM) program, a joint federal-provincial environmental monitoring program established in 2012." The CEO is Stephen Lougheed.

=== Fish and Wildlife Division ===
Fish and Wildlife Division includes a number of departments, including Fish & Wildlife Fisheries Management. Fisheries Management alone had a budget of $6.4 million to be used over three years to "help restore flood-affected fisheries and aquatic habitats in southern Alberta." Alberta Fisheries Management Round Table, Alberta's Fish Conservation Strategy, Commercial fishing in Alberta, Fish management plans and Fish Management Zones and area fisheries management Fisheries Management operate under Fisheries Management.

== Boreal woodland caribou recovery ==
Environment and Parks works in collaboration with the Aseniwuche Nation, the Foothills Landscape Management Forum (FLMF), and the Aboriginal Fund for Species at Risk on projects such as caribou monitoring. Dave Hervieux, Regional Resource Manager, Peace Region, is the woodland caribou management coordinator with Alberta Environment and Sustainable Resource Development's fish and wildlife division. "Alberta Environment estimates that the province’s caribou population has declined by nearly two thirds since the 1960s, including the extinction of herds roaming Alberta’s southern slopes. Sixteen herds remain in the province, totaling roughly 3,000 animals."

According to the Alberta Biodiversity Monitoring Institute (ABMI), an agency that monitors and reports on biodiversity status throughout the province, by 2014 all six herds of caribou, including the threatened boreal and the endangered mountain caribou, "have suffered annual rates of decline ranging from 4.6% to 15.2% from 1993 to 2012" in the oil sands region (OSR) as oil and gas production booms in northern Alberta. As these herds in the oil-sands region are "genetically distinct" from other boreal caribou populations, the ABMI report concludes that, "It is therefore unlikely that populations in the (region) will gain new members from caribou populations in other parts of the province." In a Wall Street Journal article Dawson observed that, "The report comes amid controversy over Alberta's recent sales of oil and gas development leases in areas populated by both boreal and mountain caribou."

== Alberta Environment and Kananaskis Country Golf Course flood damage ==
On 16 July 2014 the Alberta Environment and Sustainable Resource Development finalized and signed an agreement with Kan-Alta Golf Management Ltd., a company with alleged connections the provincial government to rebuild the Kananaskis Country Golf Course, as a result of the 2013 Alberta floods damage. The deal "resulted in over $5.4 million" paid to Kan-Alta Golf "to cover business losses and other expenses." During the June 2013 Alberta floods, Kananaskis Country "sustained the most extensive damage in its 36-year history." and 32 of the 36 holes at the Golf Course were damaged. The Kananaskis Country Golf Course was built by the Alberta Government in 1983 as part of economic diversification using money from the Alberta Heritage Savings Trust Fund. In 2011 the facility showed a province wide net economic impact of $14 million, 175 full-time equivalent jobs sustained province wide, a total of $4.4 million federal and $1.9 million provincial and $800,000 local taxes generated. The Alberta government committed $18 million to rebuild the Course and to protect it from future flood damage.

== Proposals for provincial parks (new and expanded) ==
In November 2018, Alberta's provincial government under Premier Rachel Notley proposed "four provincial parks, including the Bighorn Wildland Provincial Park, plus four provincial recreation areas and a new public-land-use zone in the area on the eastern slopes of the Rocky Mountains, west of Nordegg." as one way among many of "diversifying Alberta's economy through tourism".

The Bighorn Wildland Provincial Park is a proposed provincial park that would be situated near Rocky Mountain House. The proposed area to be set is "about the size of Rhode Island" and is the largest of four proposals for "new or expanded" parks. (Note: According to a January 7, 2019 The Globe and Mail article, with the oil industry in the early stages of a recovery following several years of a deep downturn, the Alberta provincial deficit is "projected at $8.8-billion".) The proposed region, situated between Banff National Park and Jasper National Park, would provide a vast and critical wildlife corridor for numerous wildlife species, including sensitive species, such as bull trout—Alberta's provincial fish, wolverine, and grizzly bears, that would extend from Yellowstone National Park in Wyoming in the south to the Yukon in Northern Canada. According to a January 7, 2019 article in The Globe and Mail, some residents of Rocky Mountain House, a town of 7,000, led by United Conservative Party (UCP) Member of the Legislative Assembly of Alberta (MLA) for Rimbey-Rocky Mountain House-Sundre, Jason Nixon, oppose the creation of the park. Nixon has made unfounded claims that the plan is a "foreign-funded plot to wall off the back country to Albertans who call the region home". On January 5, 2018, following alleged bullying and intimidation of Bighorn Wildland Provincial Park supporters, Minister Phillips issued a statement announcing that public consultations that were planned for Drayton Valley, Edmonton, Red Deer, and Sundre, would be cancelled.

== Optimizing Alberta Parks ==
In "Optimizing Alberta Parks" published in March 2020, Parks Alberta announced that in 2020, about a third of the province's parks and protected and recreation areas would be closed or handed over to third parties in a cost-saving measure.

In a March 5, 2020 statement entitled "Optimizing Alberta Parks", the Ministry of Environment and Parks under Minister Jason Nixon, announced a cost-saving program that would have an immediate impact on a third of the province's parks and protected and recreation areas in 2020. Citing an annual expense of $86 million and a revenue from these spaces of only $36 million, Nixon said that the UCP government would "fully or partially close" "20 provincial parks" and was "planning to hand over 164 others to third-party managers". The statement also mentioned that the government might potentially sell Crown land. Concerns were raised and Nixon said, "We are not selling any Crown or public land — period", according to a March 5 Calgary Herald interview. The government listed a 65-hectare plot of land east of Taber in a March 31 auction with a starting bid of $440,000, according to a March 17 Global News article.
