= Alberta Highway 93 =

Provincial highway in Banff and Jasper national parks in Alberta, Canada

Highway 93
- Banff–Windermere Highway; Icefields Parkway
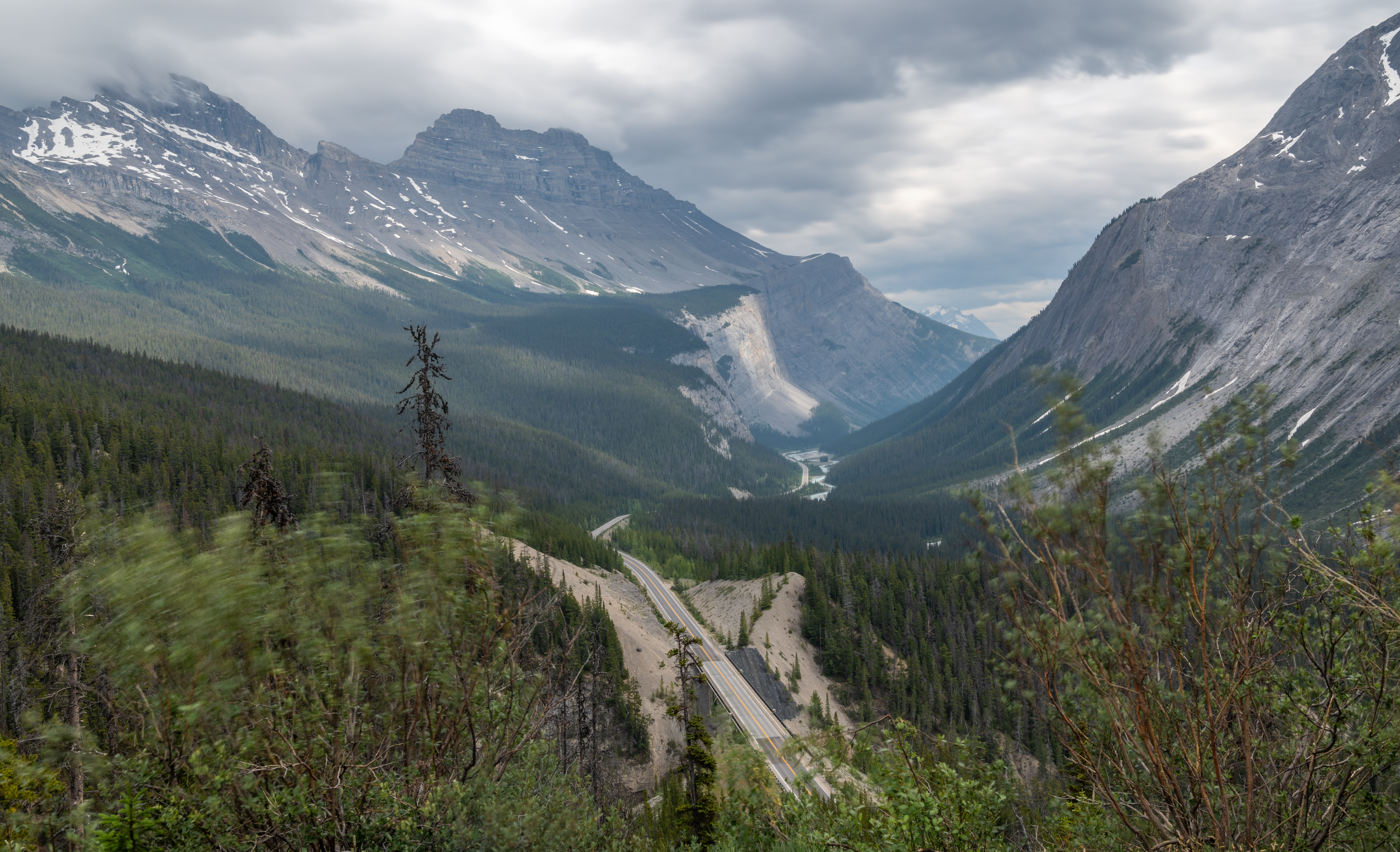
- Highway 93 as seen from the observation deck on the north side of Parker Ridge

Route information
- Maintained by the Ministry of Transportation and Economic Corridors
- Length: 265 km (165 mi)
- Existed: 1940–present
- Restrictions: No commercial vehicles and National Parks pass required along the Icefields Parkway. Snow tires or chains required Nov. 1 to Mar. 31.

Major junctions
- South end: Highway 93 at B.C. border at Vermilion Pass
- Highway 1 (TCH) near Lake Louise; Highway 1A near Lake Louise; Highway 11 in Saskatchewan River Crossing
- North end: Highway 16 (TCH) in Jasper

Location
- Country: Canada
- Province: Alberta
- Specialized and rural municipalities: I.D. No. 9, I.D. No. 12, Jasper

Highway system
- Alberta Numbered Highway Network; List; Former
← Highway 88	→ SPF

Highway 93 is a north–south highway in Alberta, Canada. It is also known as the Banff–Windermere Highway or Banff–Windermere Parkway south of the Trans-Canada Highway (Highway 1) and the Icefields Parkway north of the Trans-Canada Highway. It travels through Banff National Park and Jasper National Park and is maintained by Parks Canada for its entire length. It runs from the British Columbia border at Vermilion Pass in the south, where it becomes British Columbia Highway 93, to its terminus at the junction with the Yellowhead Highway (Highway 16) at Jasper. The route takes its number from U.S. Route 93, which runs uninterrupted south to central Arizona, and was initially designated as '93' in 1959.

== Route description ==
=== Banff–Windermere Highway ===
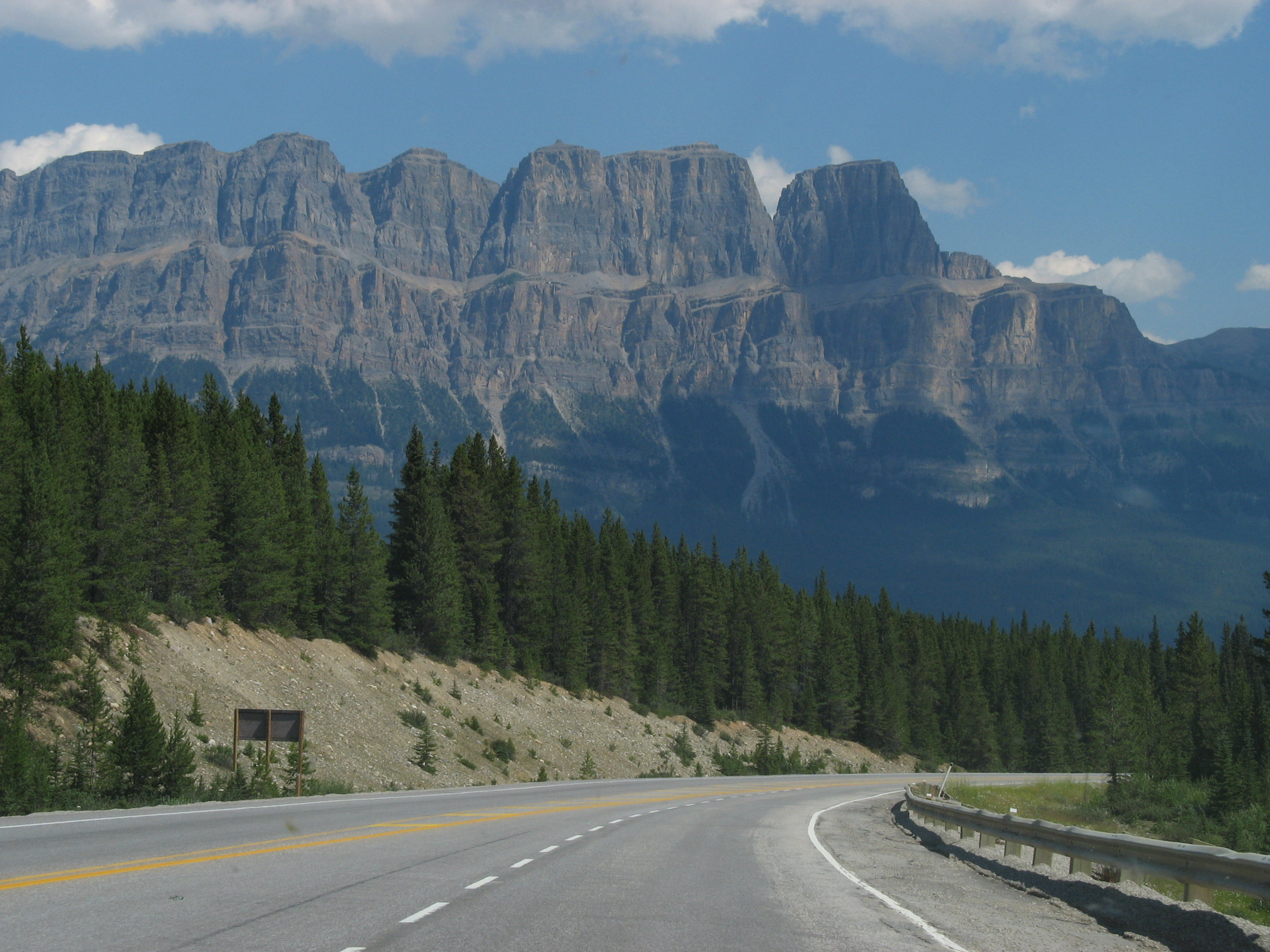
Castle Mountain, in Banff National Park, as seen from Highway 93

The southern portion of the route is part of the Banff–Windermere Highway, also known as the Banff–Windermere Parkway, a 105-kilometre (65 mi) highway that travels from British Columbia Highway 95 at Radium Hot Springs, through Kootenay National Park and Vermilion Pass across the Continental Divide, to the junction of the Bow Valley Parkway (Highway 1A) at Castle Junction. The final 11 km (6.8 mi) of the highway are in Alberta and Banff National Park. Prior to 1959, the highway was designated as Highway 1B.

=== Trans-Canada Highway ===
Highway 93 connects with the Trans-Canada Highway (Highway 1) near Castle Junction, midway between Banff and Lake Louise. Highway 93 follows the Trans-Canada Highway for 28 km (17 mi) northwest, diverging from it 3 km (1.9 mi) northwest of Lake Louise. The Trans-Canada Highway continues west to Yoho National Park.

The Bow Valley Parkway (Highway 1A) also links Lake Louise and Banff. This road parallels Highway 1 and, at the midpoint, passes Castle Junction where it links with the Banff–Windermere Highway, 1 km (0.62 mi) east of where Highway 93 connects with the Trans-Canada Highway (Highway 1).

=== Icefields Parkway ===
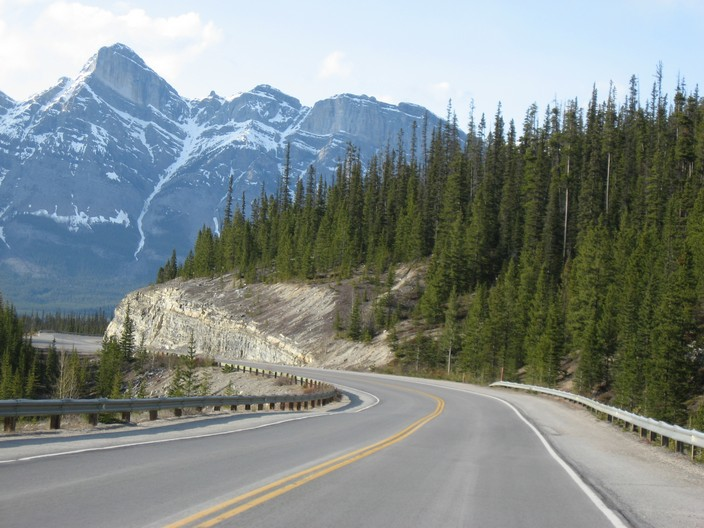
Highway 93 near Saskatchewan Crossing

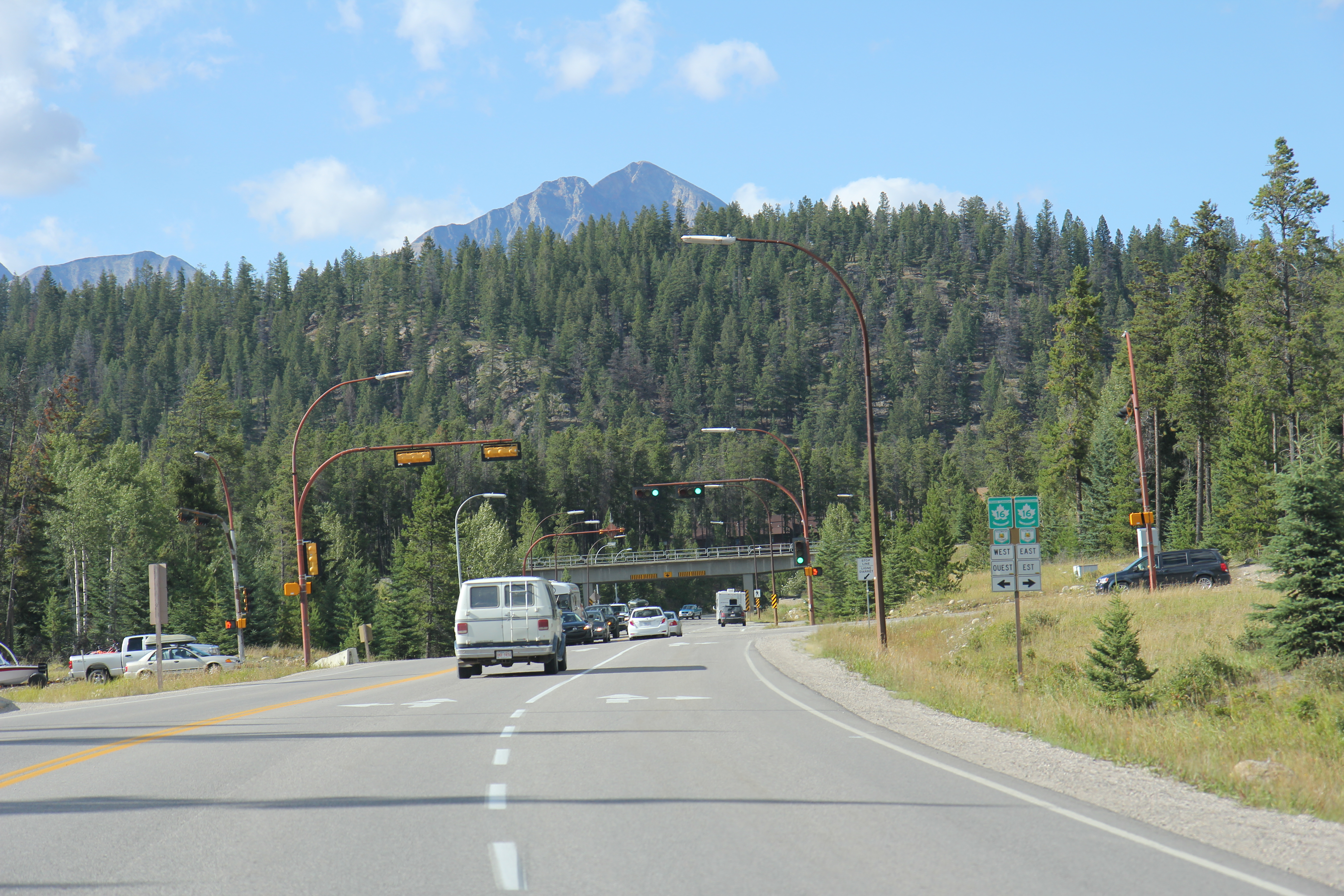
Looking north at the northern terminus of the Icefields Parkway

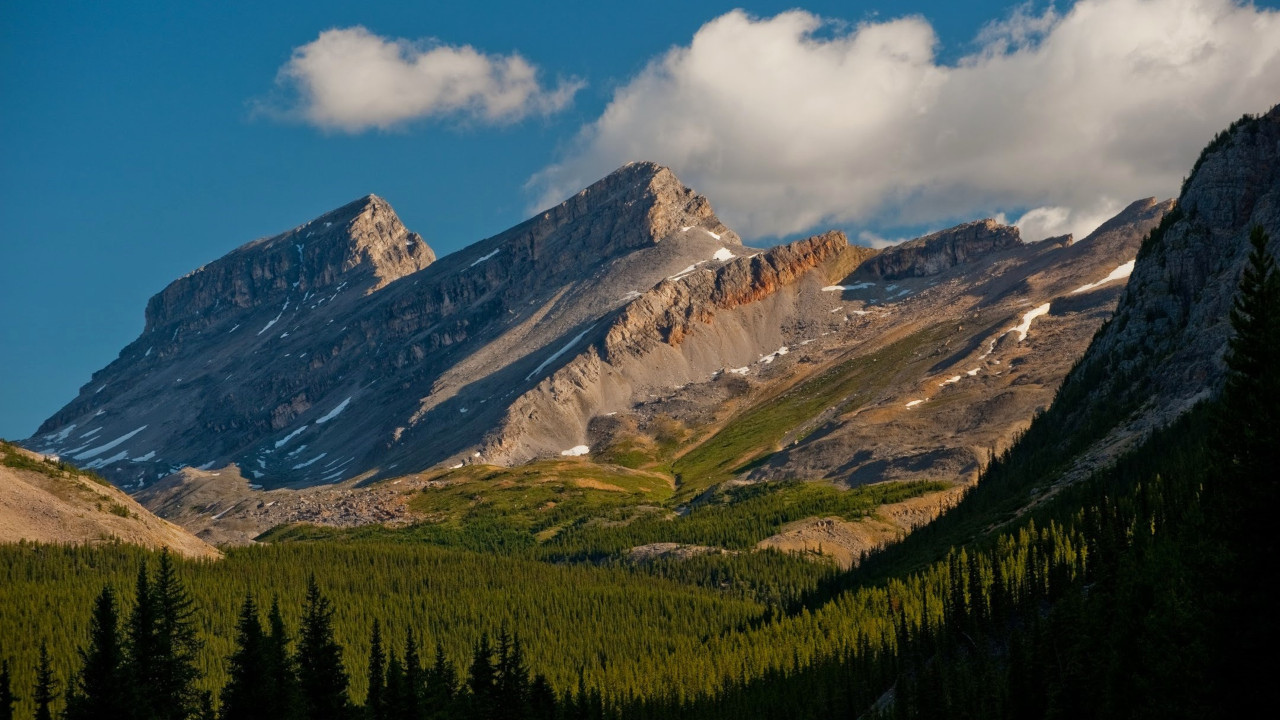
Watermelon Peak's southern outlier by Icefields Parkway

The Icefields Parkway (French: Promenade des Glaciers) is a 227-kilometre (141 mi) long scenic road that parallels the Continental Divide, traversing the rugged landscape of the Canadian Rockies, travelling through Banff National Park and Jasper National Park. It is named for features such as the Columbia Icefield, visible from the parkway. It links Lake Louise with Jasper to the north. At its southern end, the Icefields Parkway terminates at Highway 1. Highway 1 west leads to Yoho National Park in British Columbia and Highway 1 east to Lake Louise and the Town of Banff. A second parkway, the Bow Valley Parkway also links Lake Louise and the Town of Banff. Known as Highway 1A, this road parallels Highway 1 and, at the midpoint, passes Castle Junction where the Banff–Windermere Highway (and later Highway 93 south) branch southwest into Kootenay National Park in British Columbia.

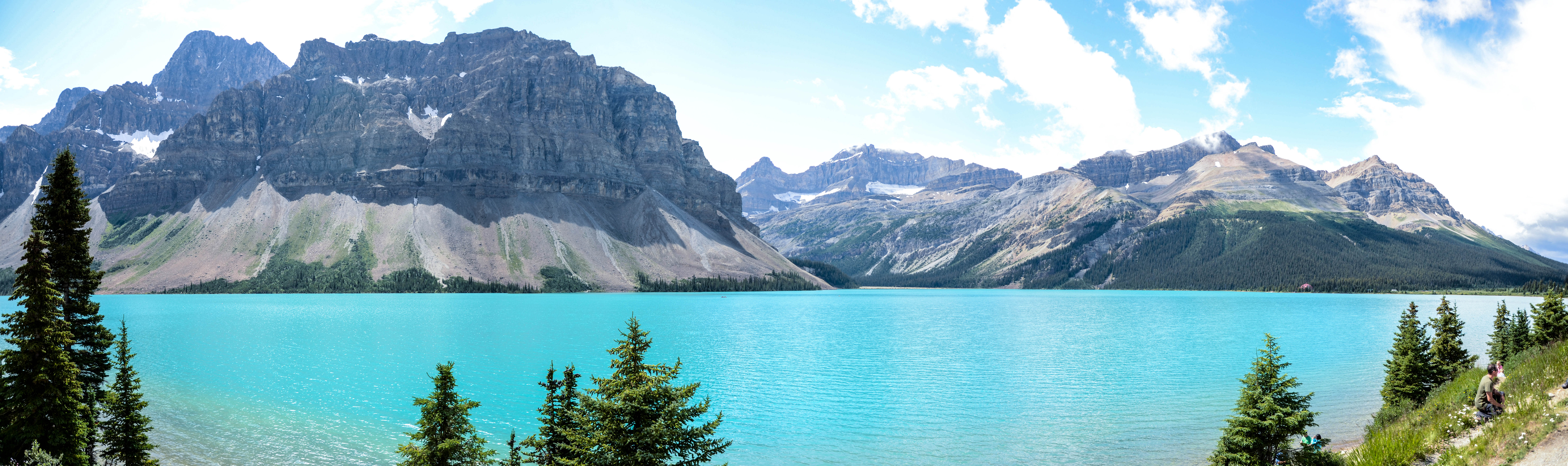
Bow Lake

The Icefields Parkway was predated by the Wonder Trail, which opened in 1885 after the Canadian Pacific Railway was completed and brought increased tourist traffic to Banff National Park. It followed the route that geologist Arthur Philemon Coleman took following the Sunwapta river. In 1931, the federal government commissioned the construction of a single-track road between Lake Louise and Jasper in the Great Depression as a relief project. In order to employ as many people as possible, the road was constructed by hand and employed 600 men. The road was completed in 1940; however, the 1950s saw an increase in automobile use and increased traffic along the parkway. In 1961, a reconstructed paved and modern highway was opened, and in 1969, Brewster Sightseeing began to operate snowmobile tours on the Athabasca Glacier, located just beside the highway.

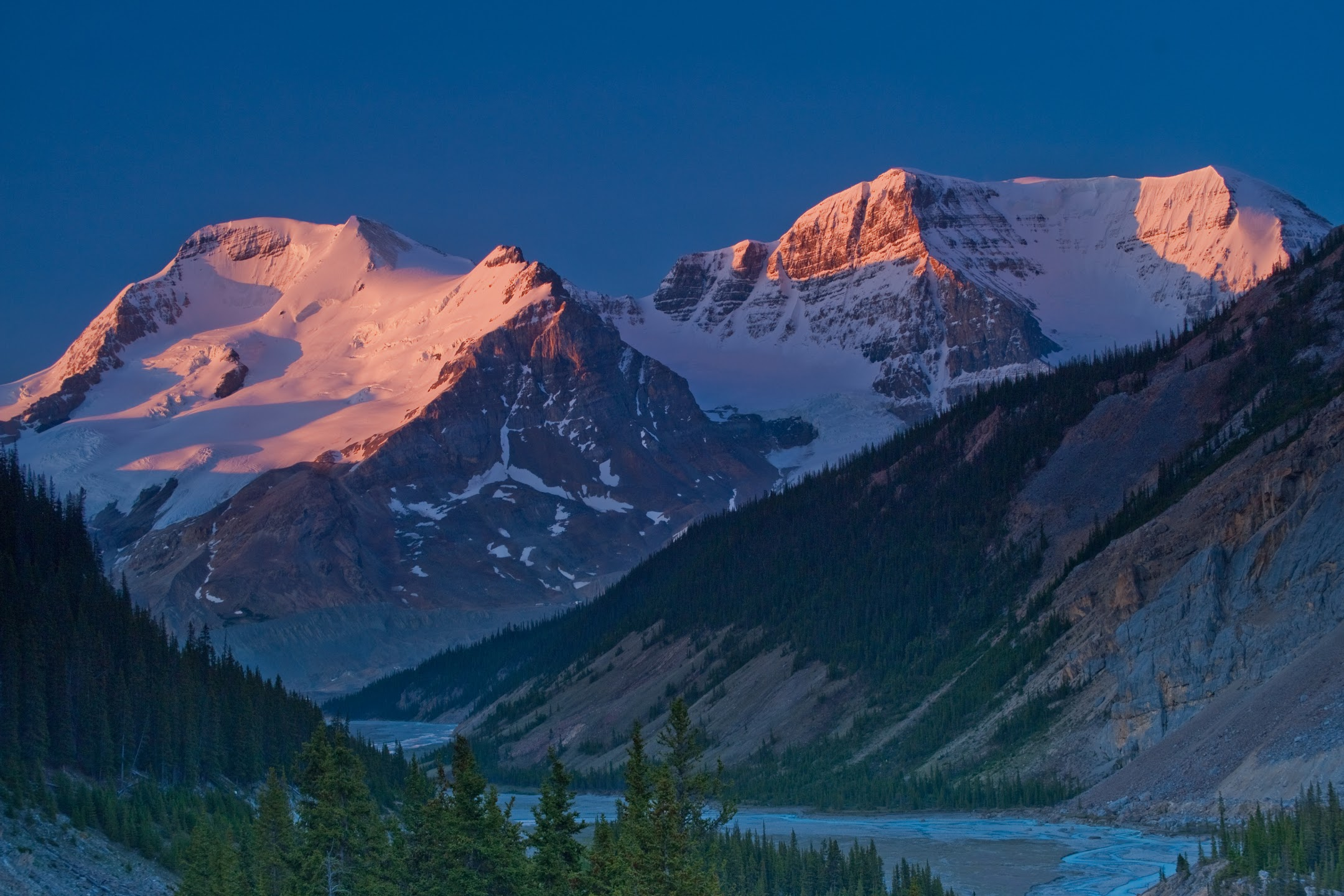
Turnouts by the Parkway aid views

The parkway is busy in July and August with up to 100,000 vehicles a month. The parkway is mainly two lanes with occasional passing lanes. It minimizes grades and hairpin turns. Snow can be expected at any time of year and extreme weather is common in winter.

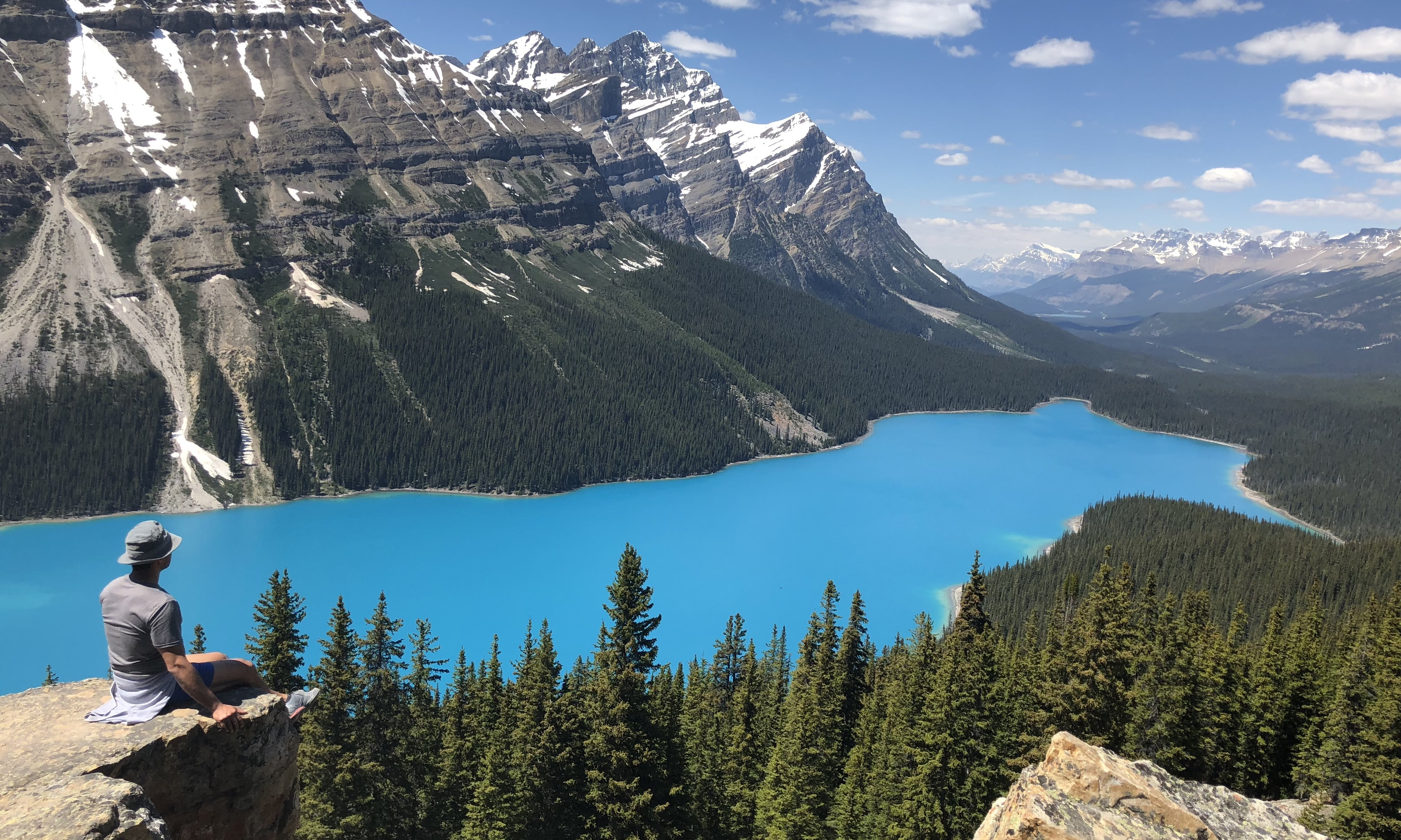
Peyto Lake

While the Icefields Parkway is not a toll road, which charges for every time a vehicle enters, a Canadian national parks permit is required to travel on the Icefields Parkway and can be purchased for a day or year from park gates near Lake Louise, Jasper and Saskatchewan River Crossing, which function similarly to tollbooths. Commercial trucks are prohibited. The speed limit is 90 km/h (55 mph) although the limit is reduced at Saskatchewan River Crossing and the Columbia Icefield area. In winter, chains or winter-rated radial tires are required by law and road closures may occur without warning. There is no cell coverage.

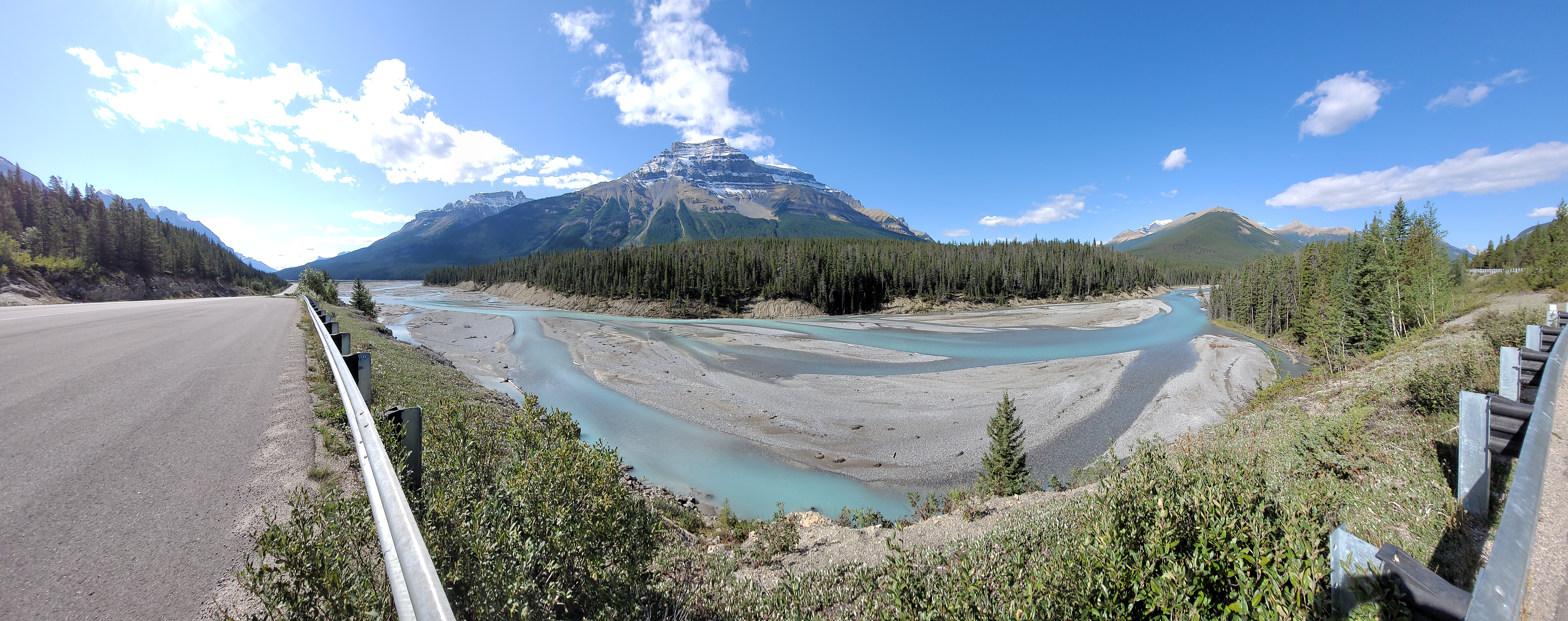
On the Icefields Parkway near Norman Creek Campground (2021)

== Major intersections ==
Starting from the south end of Highway 93:

National Park	Location	km	mi	Destinations	Notes
Banff		0.0	0.0	Highway 93 (Banff–Windermere Highway) – Kootenay National Park, Radium Hot Springs	Continental Divide; continuation into British Columbia; 51.228776°N 116.050600°W
Banff		0.0	0.0	Vermilion Pass – 1,680 m (5,510 ft)	
Banff		10.0	6.2	Highway 1 (TCH) east – Banff, Calgary To Highway 1A (Bow Valley Parkway) – Castle Mountain	Hwy 93 branches northwest; south end of Hwy 1 concurrency 51.264565°N 115.932311°W
Banff		10.0	6.2	1 km (0.62 mi) west of the northern terminus of the Banff–Windermere Highway	
Banff		32.5	20.2	Crosses the Bow River — 51.402339°N 116.159023°W	
Banff	Lake Louise	35.5	22.1	Highway 1A east (Bow Valley Parkway) / Lake Louise Drive	51.426110°N 116.173373°W
Banff		38.2	23.7	Highway 1 (TCH) west – Yoho National Park, Field, Golden	Hwy 93 branches north; North end of Hwy 1 concurrency 51.441419°N 116.201168°W
Banff		38.2	23.7	Icefields Parkway begins • National Park pass required	
Banff		38.9	24.2	Park gate	51.444582°N 116.209127°W
Banff		71.0	44.1	Crowfoot Glacier (roadside pullout)	51.663857°N 116.439681°W
Banff		73.5	45.7	unnamed road – Bow Lake	51.682351°N 116.461960°W
Banff		78.4	48.7	Bow Summit – 2,070 m (6,790 ft)	
Banff		78.4	48.7	unnamed road – Peyto Lake	51.719901°N 116.494699°W
Banff		108.8	67.6	Mistaya Canyon (roadside pullout)	51.941084°N 116.717254°W
Banff		112.4	69.8	Crosses the North Saskatchewan River — 51.970431°N 116.720373°W	
Banff	Saskatchewan; River Crossing	114.0	70.8	Highway 11 east – Rocky Mountain House, Red Deer	51.973260°N 116.742946°W
Banff		149.6	93.0	Parker Ridge (roadside pullout)	52.177048°N 117.055986°W
Banff–Jasper line		159.1	98.9	Sunwapta Pass – 2,030 m (6,660 ft) — 52.213759°N 117.163609°W	
Jasper	Columbia Icefield	163.5	101.6	Icefields Centre, Athabasca Glacier	52.219679°N 117.224859°W
Jasper		211.9	131.7	unnamed road – Sunwapta Falls	52.537049°N 117.641038°W
Jasper		235.3	146.2	Highway 93A north – Athabasca Falls	52.668965°N 117.881529°W
Jasper		257.9	160.3	Crosses the Athabasca River — 52.811830°N 118.041064°W	
Jasper		258.7	160.7	Highway 93A south – Marmot Basin	52.814144°N 118.050557°W
Jasper		259.2	161.1	Park gate	52.818584°N 118.052744°W
Jasper		263.6	163.8	Whistlers Road – Jasper Skytram	52.854548°N 118.077977°W
Jasper		264.0	164.0	Highway 93A north – Jasper	52.858376°N 118.079377°W
Jasper		264.7	164.5	Crosses the Miette River — 52.862593°N 118.086487°W	
Jasper	Jasper	265.4	164.9	Icefields Parkway ends	
Jasper	Jasper	265.4	164.9	Highway 16 (TCH/YH) – Prince George, Kamloops, Edmonton Connaught Drive – Jasper	Hwy 93 northern terminus 52.866548°N 118.093284°W
1.000 mi = 1.609 km; 1.000 km = 0.621 mi: Concurrency terminus; Tolled

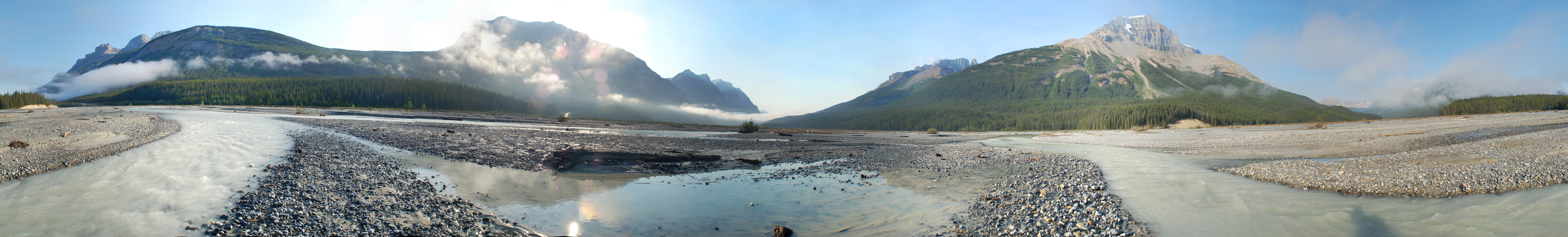
360° panorama of Mount Amery and the Alexandra River in the Icefields Parkway of Jasper and Banff national parks. Low clouds drift along as the morning sun rises over Mount Wilson.

== Highway 93A ==
- Highway 93A
- Location: Jasper National Park

Southern section
- Length: 24 km (15 mi)
- South end: Highway 93 near Athabasca Falls
- North end: Highway 93 near Marmot Basin

Northern section
- Length: 1.7 km (1.1 mi)
- South end: Highway 93 near Jasper
- North end: Highway 16 (TCH) near Jasper

Just south of Jasper, a short spur of the parkway branches off as Highway 93A, providing access to businesses on the south side of Jasper and providing an alternative route into the community via Hazel Avenue. Another Highway 93A spur farther south is 24 km (15 mi) long, is along Highway 93 and provides alternative access to viewpoints and other attractions within Jasper National Park.

Highway 93A south of Jasper is narrow and the pavement uneven, with an average limit of 60 km/h (37 mph). Brush grows up to the side of the highway so animals can be difficult to see. Old Fort Point Road branches east of Highway 93A and quickly leads to Old Fort Point Bridge, where vehicles can cross the Athabasca River.

== See also ==
- List of Alberta provincial highways
- Gallery of photographs from the Icefields Parkway
