= Grand Rapids (Athabasca River) =

Coordinates: 56°19′32″N 112°36′22″W

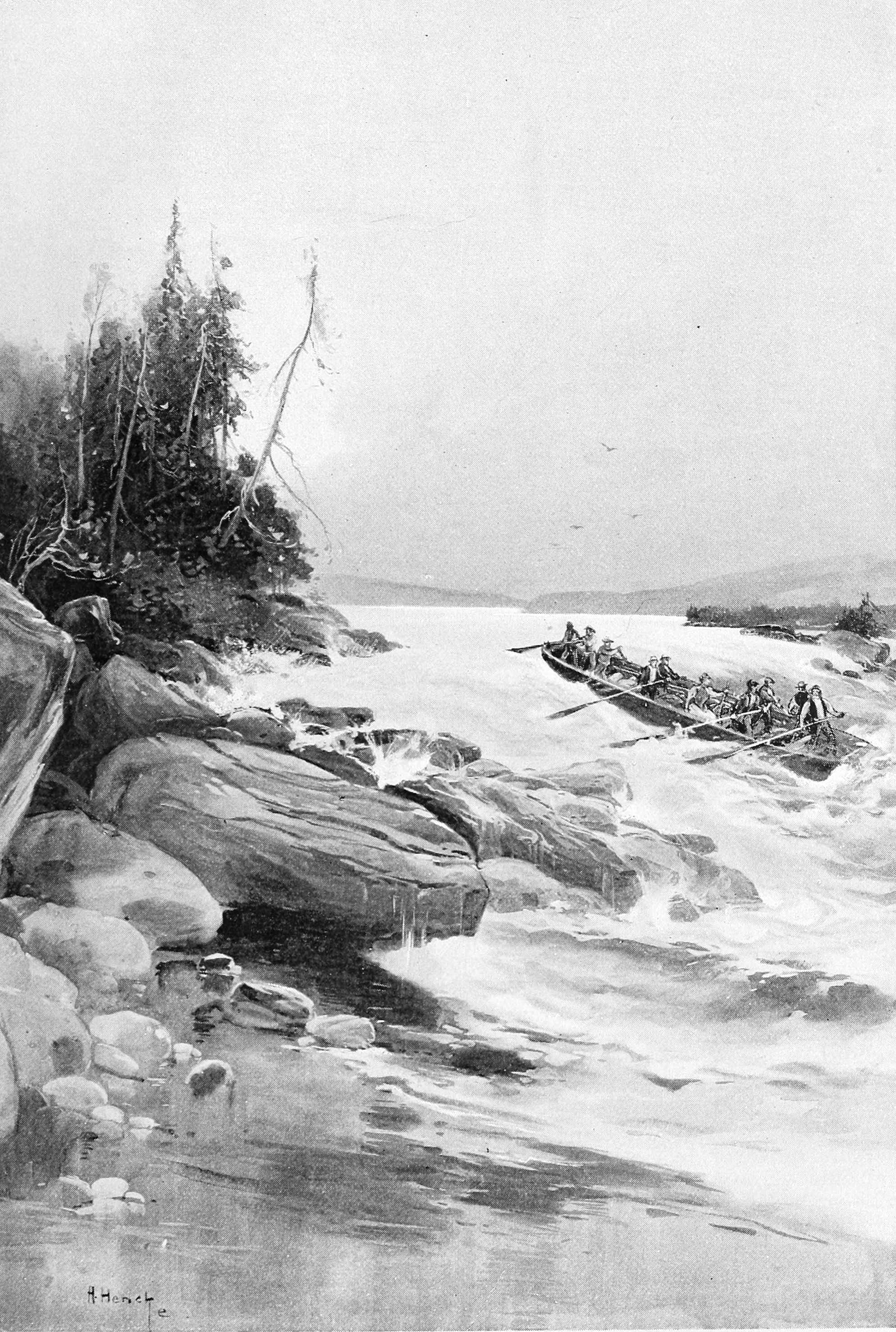

Grand Rapids is found 427.4 kilometres (265.6 mi) from the mouth of the Athabasca River, Alberta, Canada.

The rapids are found on both sides of an island in the river. In the channel is an island, where the Hudson's Bay Company built a tramway to transport the outfits for all the northern posts. The river drops 100 feet (30 m) over 1 mile (1.6 km) at the rapids.

"In 1989, the Athabasca River was designated a Canadian Heritage River for its importance to the fur trade and the construction of railways and roads opening up the Canadian West, as well as for its natural heritage."

Grand Rapids Wildland Provincial Park in the Rapids Reach of the Athabasca River upstream from Ft. McMurray is a critical moose wintering range. Scenic, with "numerous rapids, rock outcrops and slump blocks...the river is deeply incised for the entire length of the park, in places exceeding 150 metres." The historic portage route has been restored.

An 1893 geological survey was published as a report of the expedition titled Report on the Doobaunt, Kazan and Ferguson Rivers.
