= List of crossings of the Athabasca River =

This is a list of crossings of the Athabasca River in the Canadian province of Alberta from the river's origin in the Columbia Icefield to its mouth at Lake Athabasca.

== Crossings in use ==
This is a list of crossings in use from upstream to downstream. Crossings include bridges, ferries, and dams (road, pedestrian, and railway).

| Crossing | Carries | Location | Notes | Coordinates |
|---|---|---|---|---|
| Athabasca Falls Pedestrian Bridge | Pedestrians | Athabasca Falls | Bridge is almost directly over Athabasca Falls | 52°39′52″N 117°53′4″W |
| Highway bridge | Alberta Highway 93A | very near Athabasca Falls | Bridge is very near Athabasca Falls | 52°39′53″N 117°53′5″W |
| Highway bridge | Alberta Highway 93 (Icefields Parkway) | west of Valley of the Five Lakes | | 52°48′42″N 118°2′27″W |
| Old Fort Point Bridge | Old Fort Point Road or Lac Beauvert access Road | south of Jasper | | 52°52′14″N 118°3′47″W |
| Moberly Bridge | Maligne Road | west of Edith Lake & Annette Lake | Built by the Dominion Bridge Company | 52°54′35″N 118°3′29″W |
| 12 mile Bridge | Yellowhead Highway (Alberta Highway 16) | south of Snaring | | 53°2′27″N 118°5′22″W |
| Solomon bridge | Canadian National Railway | west of Entrance | | 53°21′25″N 117°46′2″W |
| Highway bridge | Alberta Highway 40 | northwest of Entrance | | 53°22′39″N 117°41′50″W |
| Emerson Bridge | Emerson Creek Road | north of Hinton | | 53°42′05″N 117°09′49″W |
| Highway bridge | Highway 947 | southeast of Fox Creek | | 54°9′5″N 116°35′40″W |
| Railway bridge | Canadian National Railway | southeast of Fox Creek | | 54°9′10″N 116°35′35″W |
| Highway bridge | Alberta Highway 43 | Whitecourt | | 54°09′07″N 115°43′10″W |
| Highway bridge | Alberta Highway 658 | north of Blue Ridge | | 54°09′34″N 115°23′25″W |
| Highway bridge | Alberta Highway 33 | south of Fort Assiniboine | | 54°19′14″N 114°47′06″W |
| Klondyke Ferry | Alberta Highway 661 | northwest of Vega | Has the capacity to carry up to 50 passengers and 13 mid-size cars | 54°25′56″N 114°29′1″W |
| Highway bridge | Alberta Highway 2 | west of Hondo | | 55°04′25″N 114°05′34″W |
| Smith CN bridge | Canadian National Railway | west of Smith | | 55°9′37″N 114°3′32″W |
| Smith Bridge | Range Rd 11A | north of Smith | | 55°10′12″N 114°02′37″W |
| Highway bridge | Alberta Highway 813 | Athabasca | | 54°43′41″N 113°16′29″W |
| Road bridge | Municipal district road | northeast of Athabasca | | 54°57′07″N 112°57′45″W |
| Highway bridge | Alberta Highway 63 | Fort McMurray | | 56°43′53″N 111°23′52″W |
| Athabasca River Bridge | Base Plant Rd | north of Fort McMurray | | 57°00′03″N 111°27′21″W |
| Peter Lougheed Bridge | Alberta Highway 63 | south of Fort McKay | | 57°08′05″N 111°36′35″W |
