= Grand Rapids Wildland Provincial Park =

Provincial park in Alberta, Canada

- IUCN category Ib (wilderness area)
- Location within Alberta Location within Canada
- Location: Wood Buffalo and M.D. of Opportunity, Alberta, Canada
- Nearest city: Fort McMurray
- Coordinates: 56°33′45″N 112°15′00″W
- Area: 26,331.643 ha (101.66704 sq mi)
- Established: 20 December 2000
- Governing body: Alberta Forestry, Parks and Tourism

Grand Rapids Wildland Provincial Park is a wildland provincial park in Wood Buffalo and Municipal District of Opportunity, northern Alberta, Canada. The park was established on 20 December 2000 with an area of 25,666.61 hectares (63,423.6 acres). The area was adjusted slightly in 2004 to 24,178.02 hectares (59,745.2 acres) and again on 20 December 2004 to its current area of 26,331.643 hectares (65,066.91 acres). The park is part of the Lower Athabasca Regional Plan. The park is named for the Grand Rapids on the Athabasca River that are within the park.

== Location ==
The park contains the Athabasca River and valley upstream (east and southeast) of Fort McMurray following the river until its junction with the House River just north of the House River Indian Cemetery 178. The park contains only the river valley lands: "All those parcels or tracts of land ... lying below the break of slope". The park has no road access; it is accessible via boat or aircraft in the summer and snowmobile in winter.

== Ecology ==
The park is in the Central Mixedwood subregion of the Boreal Forest natural region of Alberta. The park protects the Rapids Reach of the Athabasca River upstream from Fort McMurray. Moose winter on the forested valley slopes. Fish species on the river include walleye, lake whitefish, mountain whitefish, Arctic grayling, Northern pike, and goldeye. The Rapids Reach is scenic, with numerous rapids, outcrops, and slump blocks. The river erosion has created a deep valley exceeding 150 metres (490 ft) for the entire length of the park. The meanders that have eroded into the bedrock are a significant feature of the park.

== Activities ==
The park's facilities are limited; wildlife viewing, backcountry camping, and random backcountry camping are available. Snowmobiles are permitted on existing trails only. Canoeing and boating are permitted. Aircraft access and landing in the park requires authorization. Hunting and fishing are allowed with proper permits. A wilderness lodge and cabins are located just inside the southernmost boundary of the park. The rapids are rated as Class 6 on the International scale of river difficulty.

== See also ==
- List of Alberta provincial parks
- List of Canadian provincial parks
