= Watermelon Peak =

Mountain peak in Banff NP, Canada

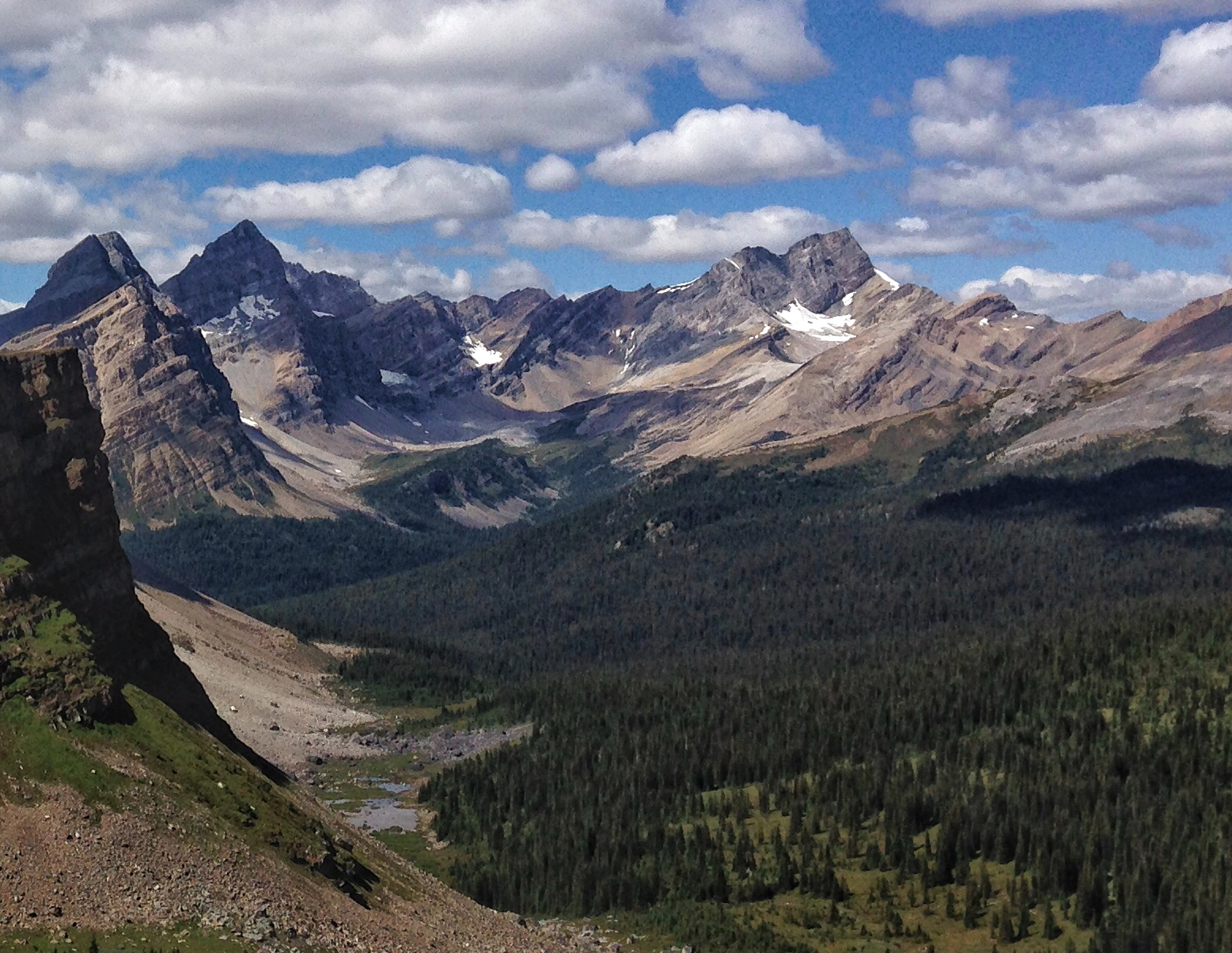
- Watermelon Peak seen from Molar Pass with summit to right of centre and outlier S2 to left

Highest point
- Elevation: 3,095 m (10,154 ft)
- Prominence: 674 m (2,211 ft)
- Parent peak: Deluc Peak (3182 m)
- Listing: Mountains of Alberta
- Coordinates: 51°42′56″N 116°20′35″W

Geography
- Location within Alberta Location within Canada
- Interactive map of Watermelon Peak
- Country: Canada
- Province: Alberta
- Protected area: Banff National Park
- Parent range: Canadian Rockies
- Topo map: NTS 82N9 Hector Lake

Geology
- Rock age: Cambrian

Climbing
- First ascent: 1966 D. Michael, W.V.G. Matthews, W.L. Putnam, M. Stearns, L.R. Wallace
- Easiest route: Scrambling YDS 3

Watermelon Peak is a 3,095-metre (10,154-foot) summit located in Banff National Park, in the Canadian Rockies of Alberta, Canada. Its nearest higher peak is Deluc Peak, 13.5 km (8.4 mi) to the east.

== History ==
Watermelon Peak was named in 1966 by William L. Putnam, member of the first ascent party, which carried a four-kilogram watermelon to the summit, and consumed it there. The July 1966 first ascent party included David Michael, W.V.G. Matthews, William L. Putnam, M. Stearns, and L.R. Wallace. However, the name is not officially recognized by the Geographical Names Board of Canada. (Note: The peak is not listed in the Canadian Geographical Names Database.)

== Geology ==
Like other mountains in Banff Park, Watermelon Peak is composed of sedimentary rock laid down during the Precambrian to Jurassic periods. Formed in shallow seas, this sedimentary rock was pushed east and over the top of younger rock during the Laramide orogeny.

== Climate ==
Based on the Köppen climate classification, Watermelon Peak is located in a subarctic climate zone with cold, snowy winters, and mild summers. Winter temperatures can drop below −20 °C with wind-chill factors below −30 °C. Precipitation runoff from Watermelon Peak drains into the Bow River and Siffleur River which are both tributaries of the Saskatchewan River.

== See also ==
- List of mountains in the Canadian Rockies
- Geography of Alberta
- Geology of the Rocky Mountains

== Gallery ==
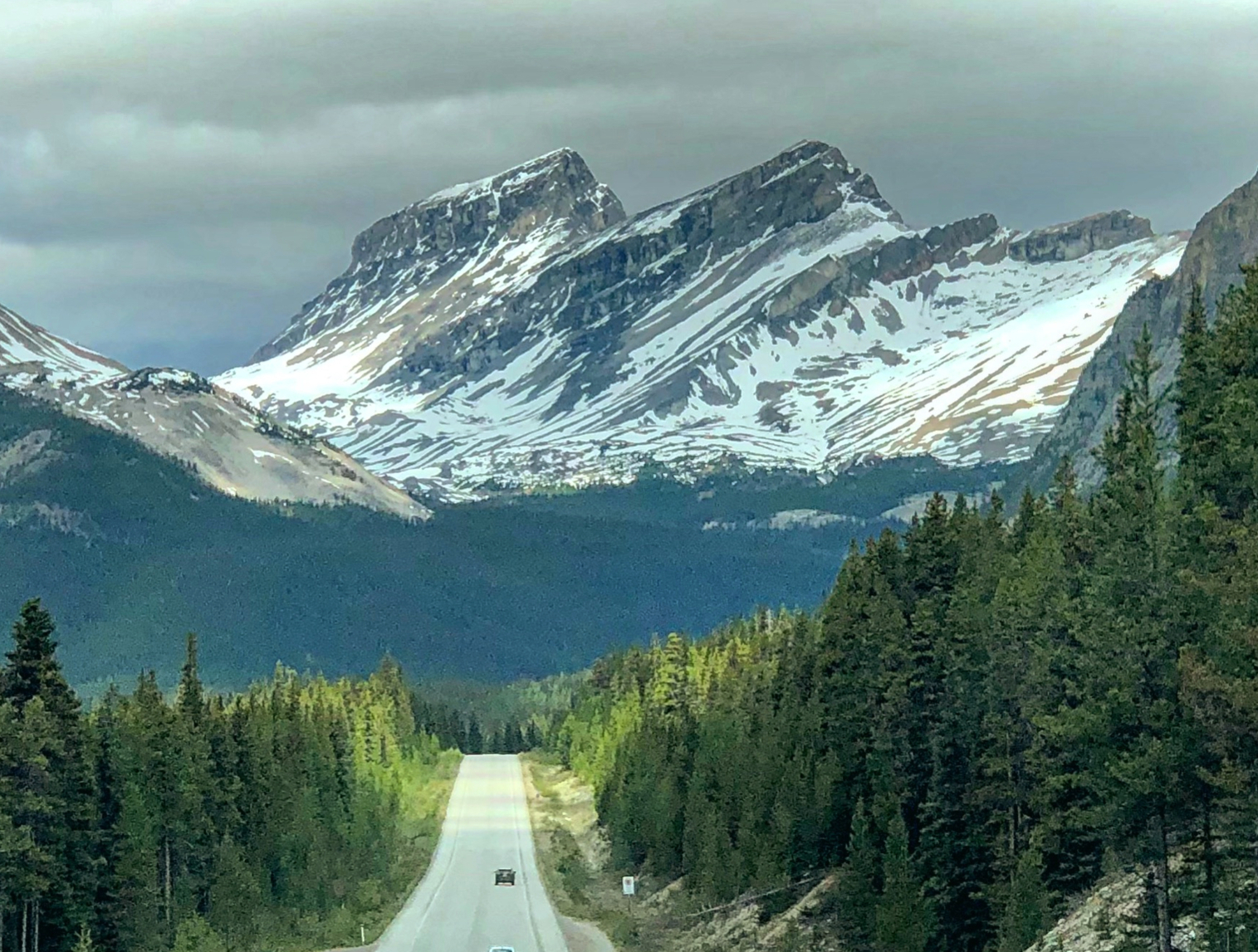
Watermelon Peak's southern outlier, S2 (2929 m), seen from Icefields Parkway

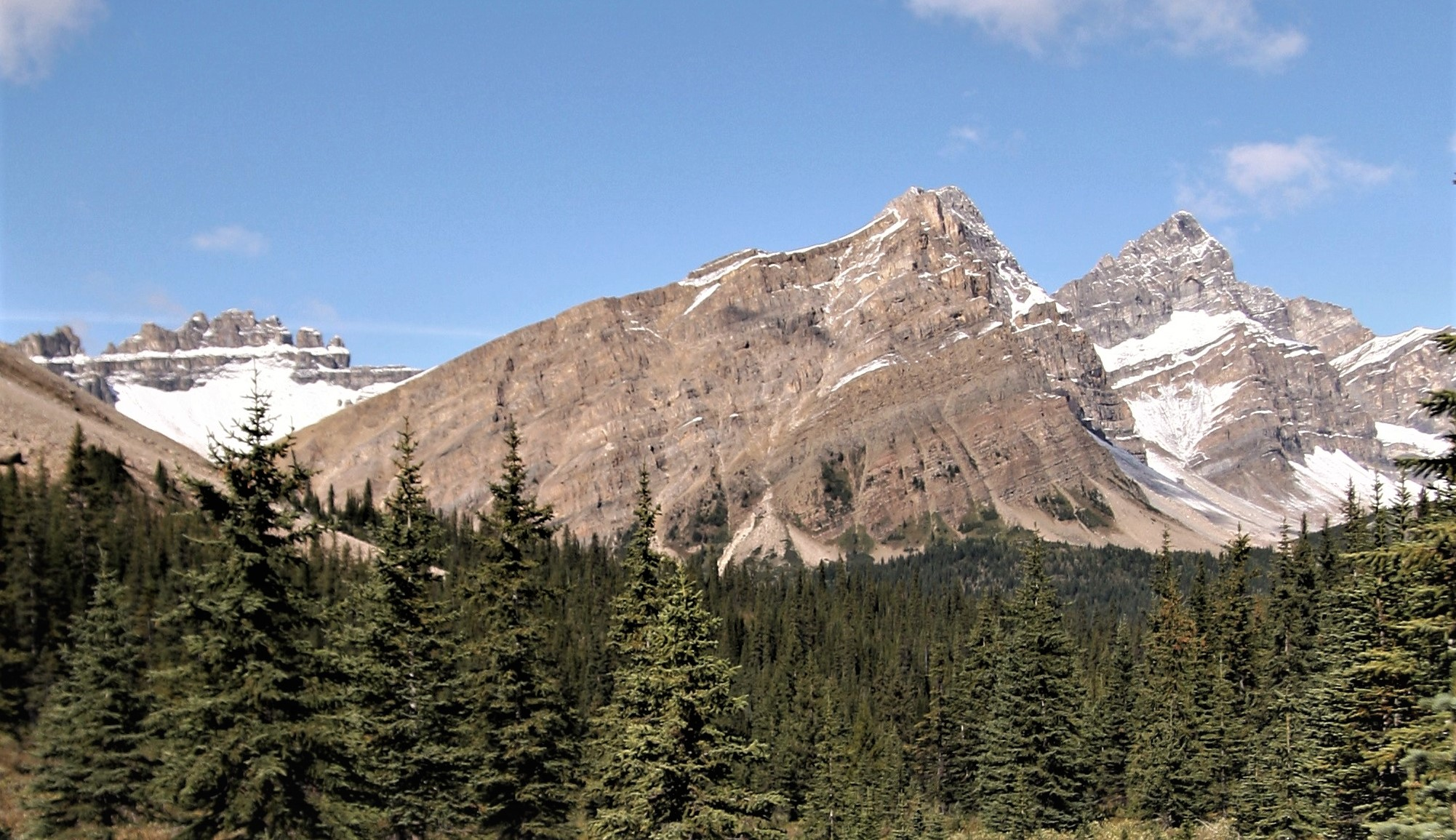
Southeast aspect of Watermelon S2 (right) and Dolomite Peak (left).
