= Athabasca Falls =

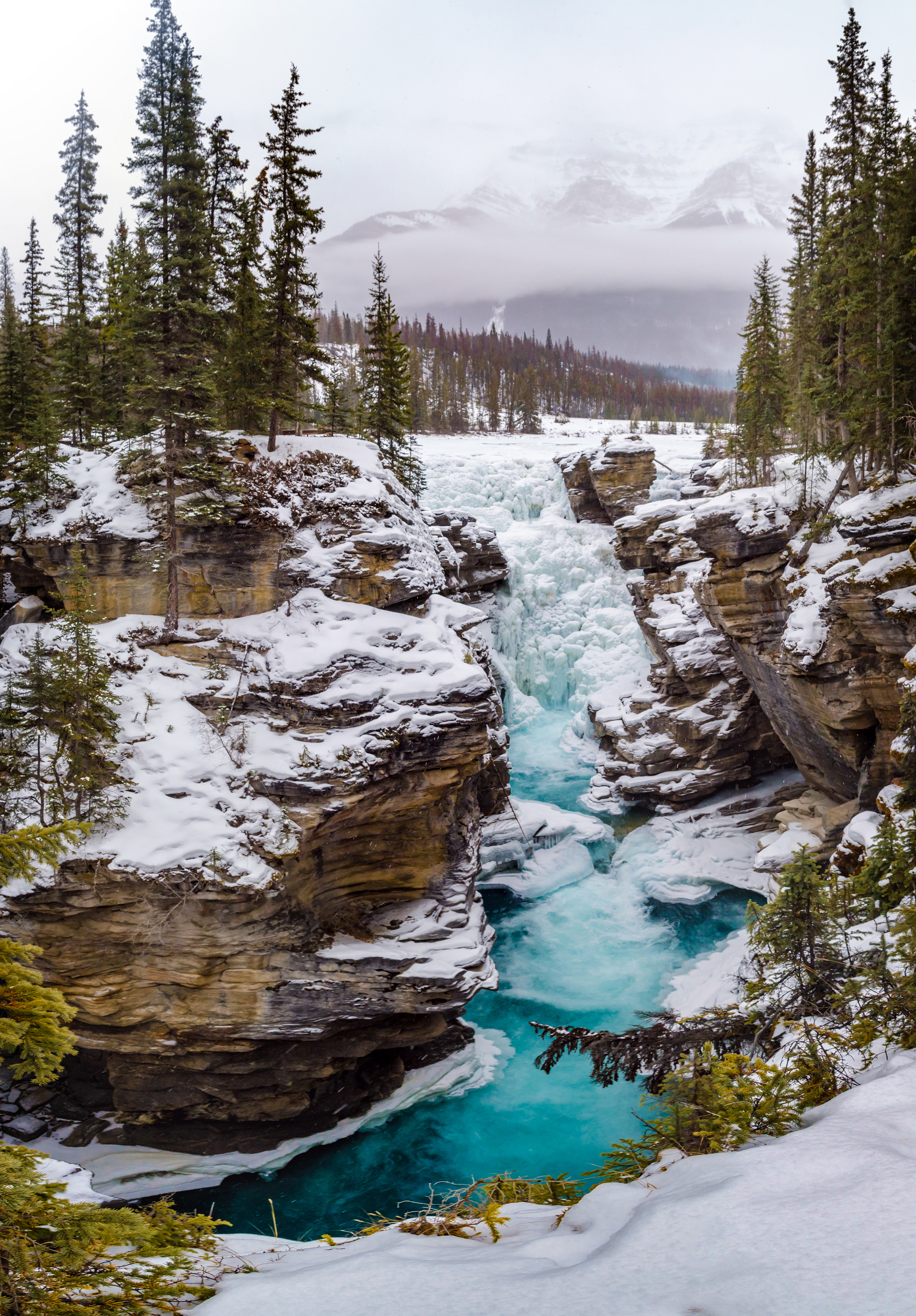
- Winter falls in the late January
- Interactive map of Athabasca Falls
- Location: Jasper National Park, Alberta, Canada
- Coordinates: 52°39′51″N 117°53′01″W
- Type: Segmented Horsetails
- Total height: 24 m (79 ft)
- Number of drops: 2
- Longest drop: 20 m (66 ft)
- Total width: 46 m (151 ft)
- Average width: 30 m (98 ft)
- Run: 15 m (49 ft)
- Watercourse: Athabasca River
- Average flow rate: 113 m^{3}/s (4,000 cu ft/s)

Athabasca Falls is a waterfall in Jasper National Park on the upper Athabasca River, approximately 30 kilometres (19 mi) south of the townsite of Jasper, Alberta, Canada, and just west of the Icefields Parkway.

== Geography and geology ==
Athabasca Falls is a Class 5 waterfall, with a total drop height of 24 m (79 ft) and a width of 46 m (151 ft). A powerful, picturesque waterfall, Athabasca Falls is not known so much for its height as for its force, due to the large quantity of water falling into the gorge, which can be substantial even on a cold morning in the fall, when river levels tend to be at their lowest. The river falls over a layer of hard quartzite and through the softer limestone below, carving a short gorge and a number of potholes.

== Access ==
The falls can be safely viewed and photographed from various viewing platforms and walking trails around the falls. Access is from the nearby parking lot, which leads off Highway 93A just northeast of the falls. Highway 93A takes off from the nearby Icefields Parkway, and crosses the falls on the way north to the town of Jasper. Whitewater rafting often starts below the falls to travel downstream on the Athabasca River to Jasper.

The Athabasca Falls are located near two Athabasca River crossings: Highway 93A has a historic bridge which allows vehicles to cross the river, and there is also a pedestrian bridge located nearby, closer to the falls.

== Photo gallery ==
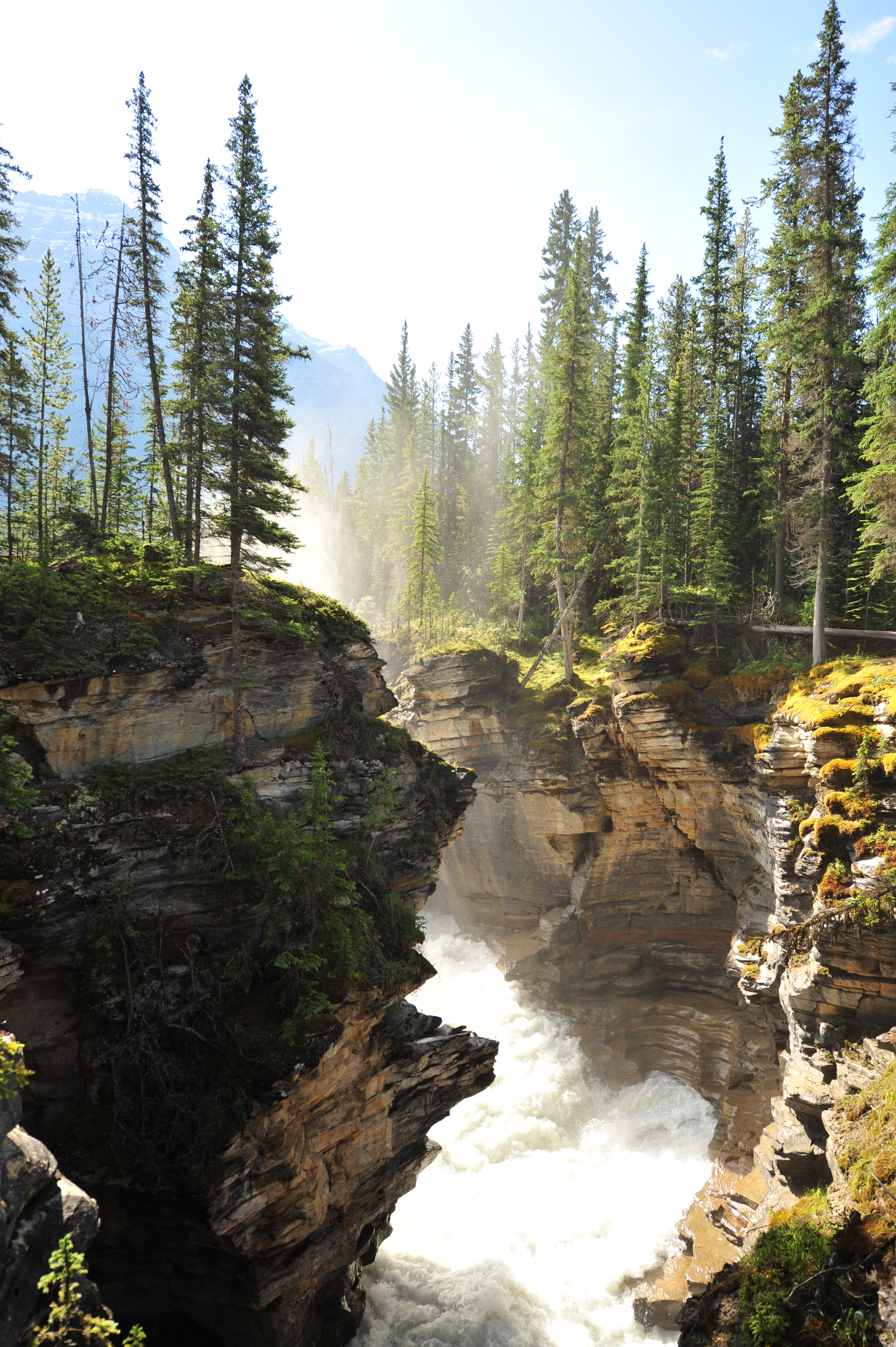

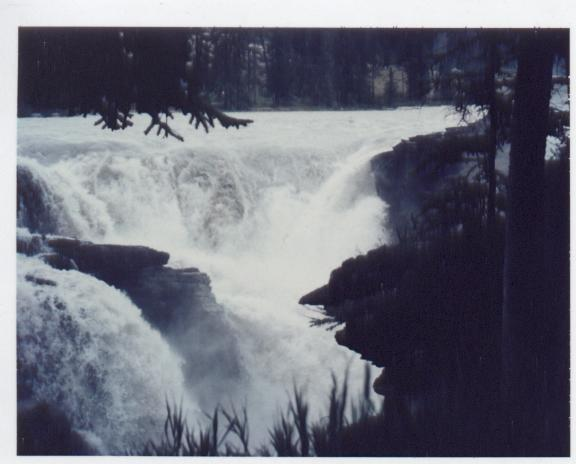

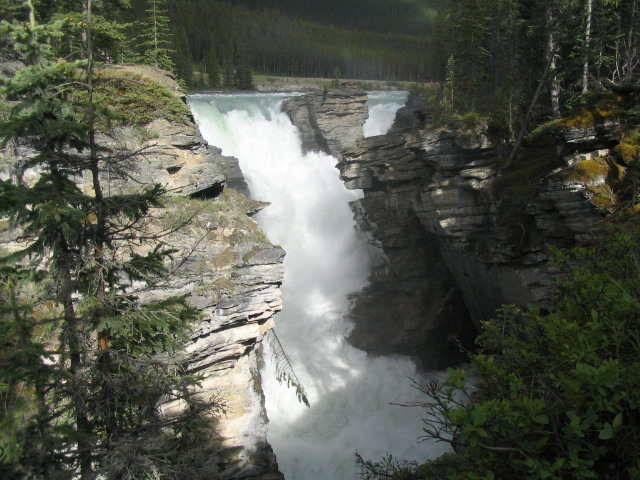

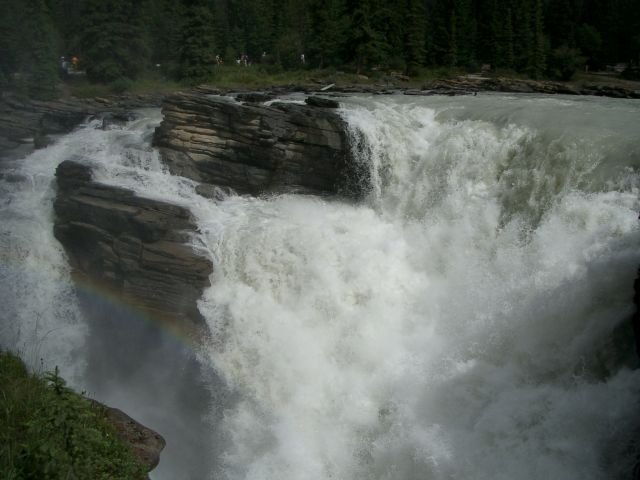

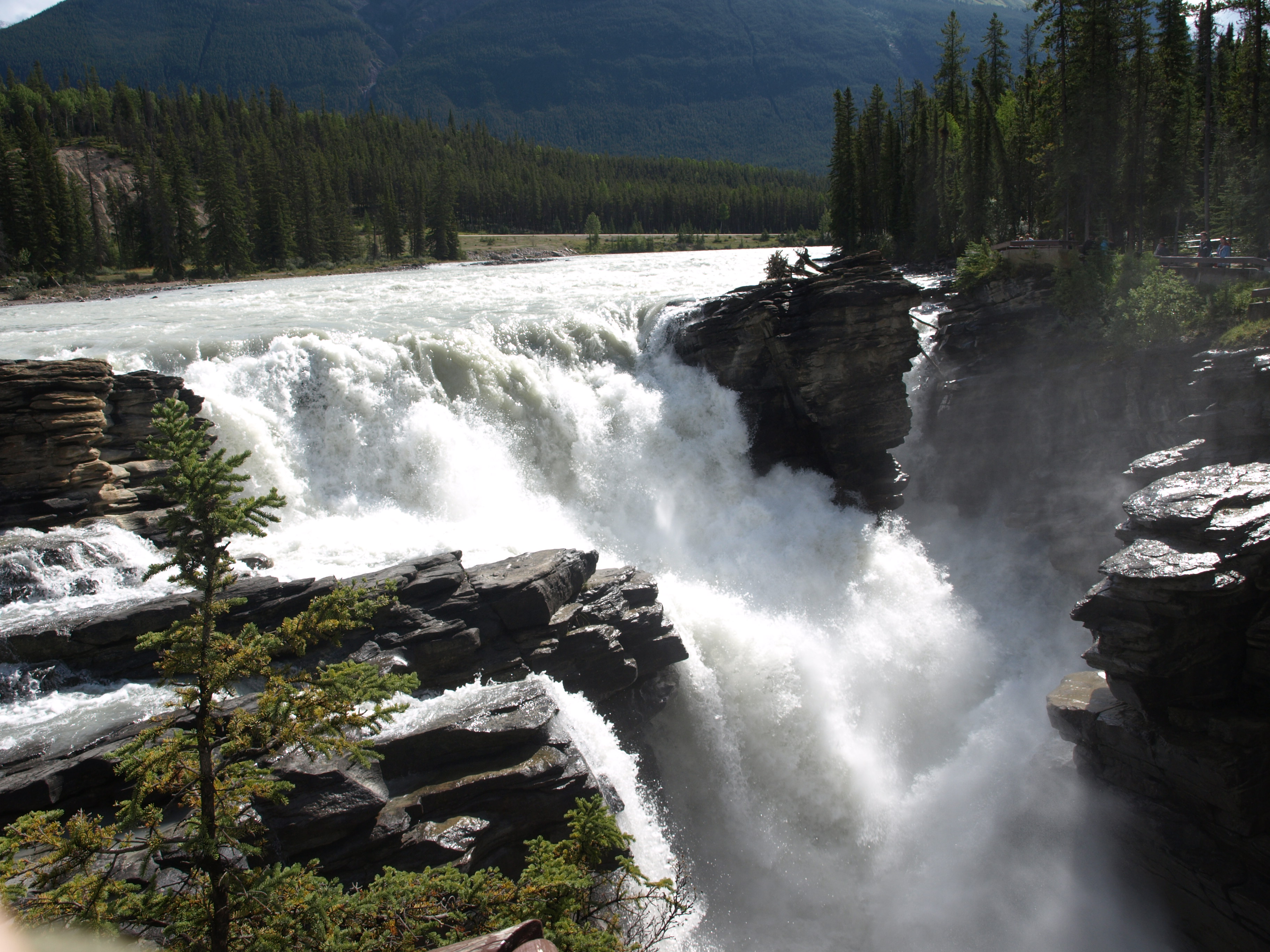

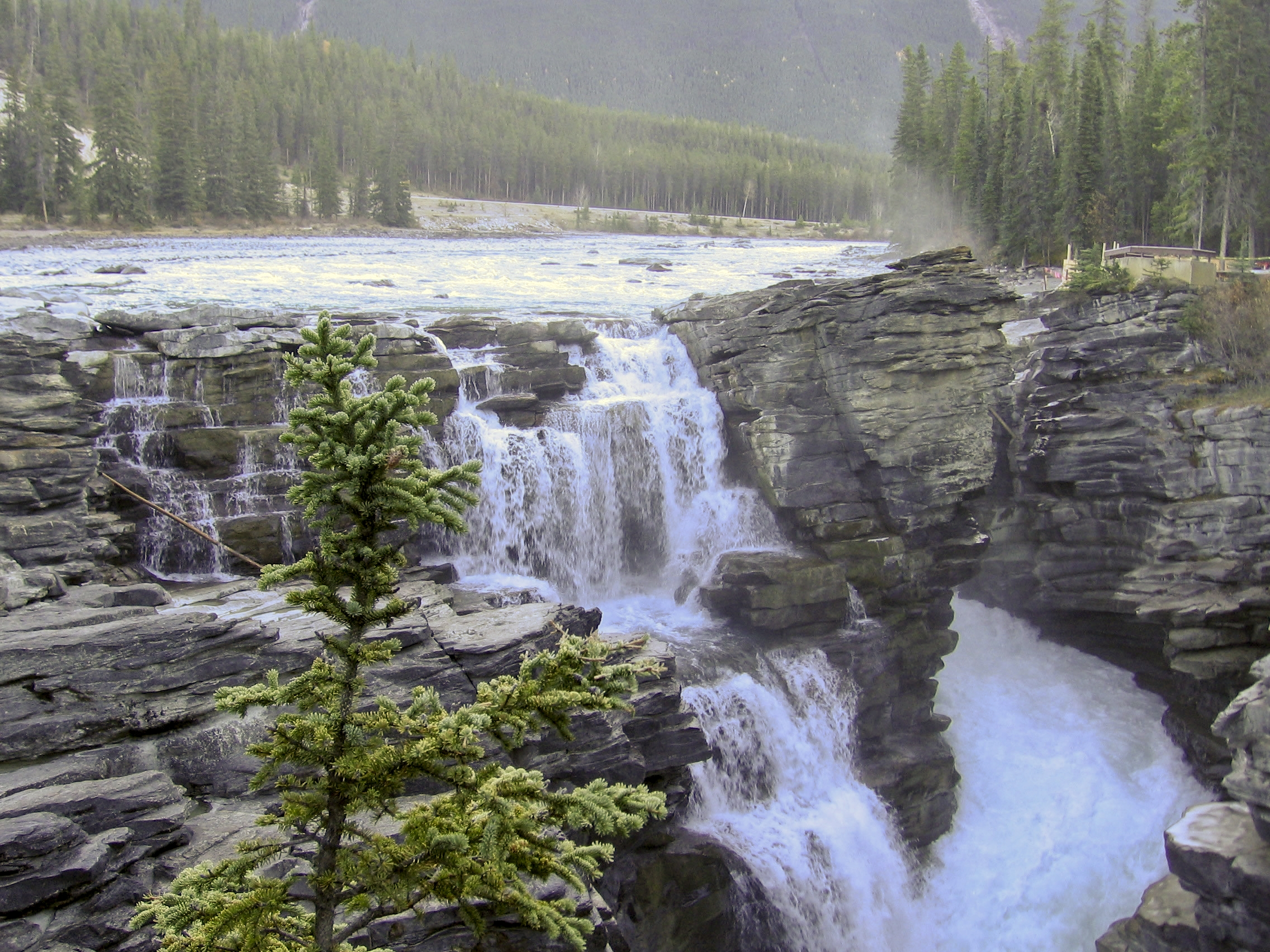

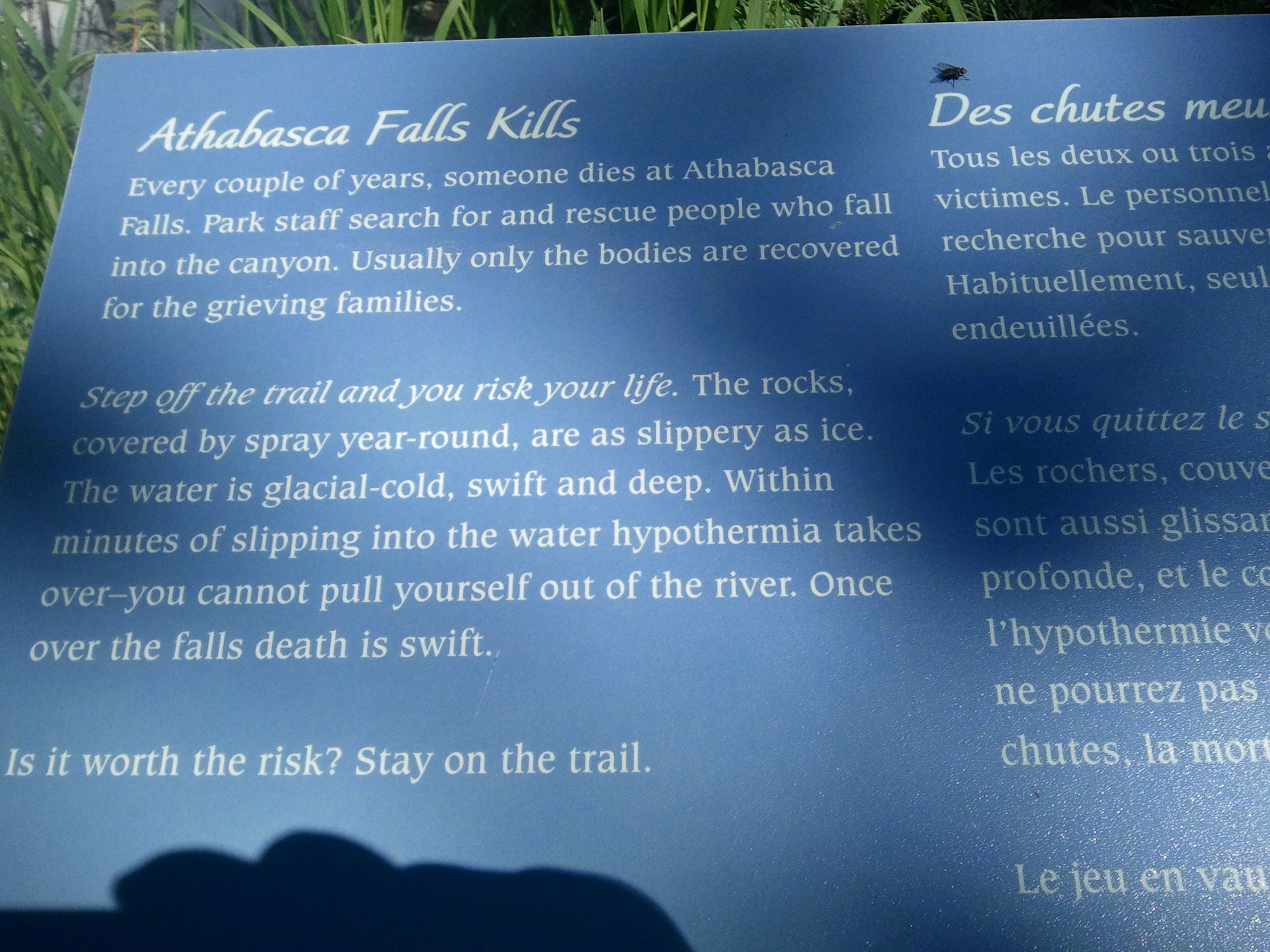
Warning sign

== See also ==
- List of waterfalls
- List of waterfalls of Canada
