= Athabasca River =

River in Alberta, Canada

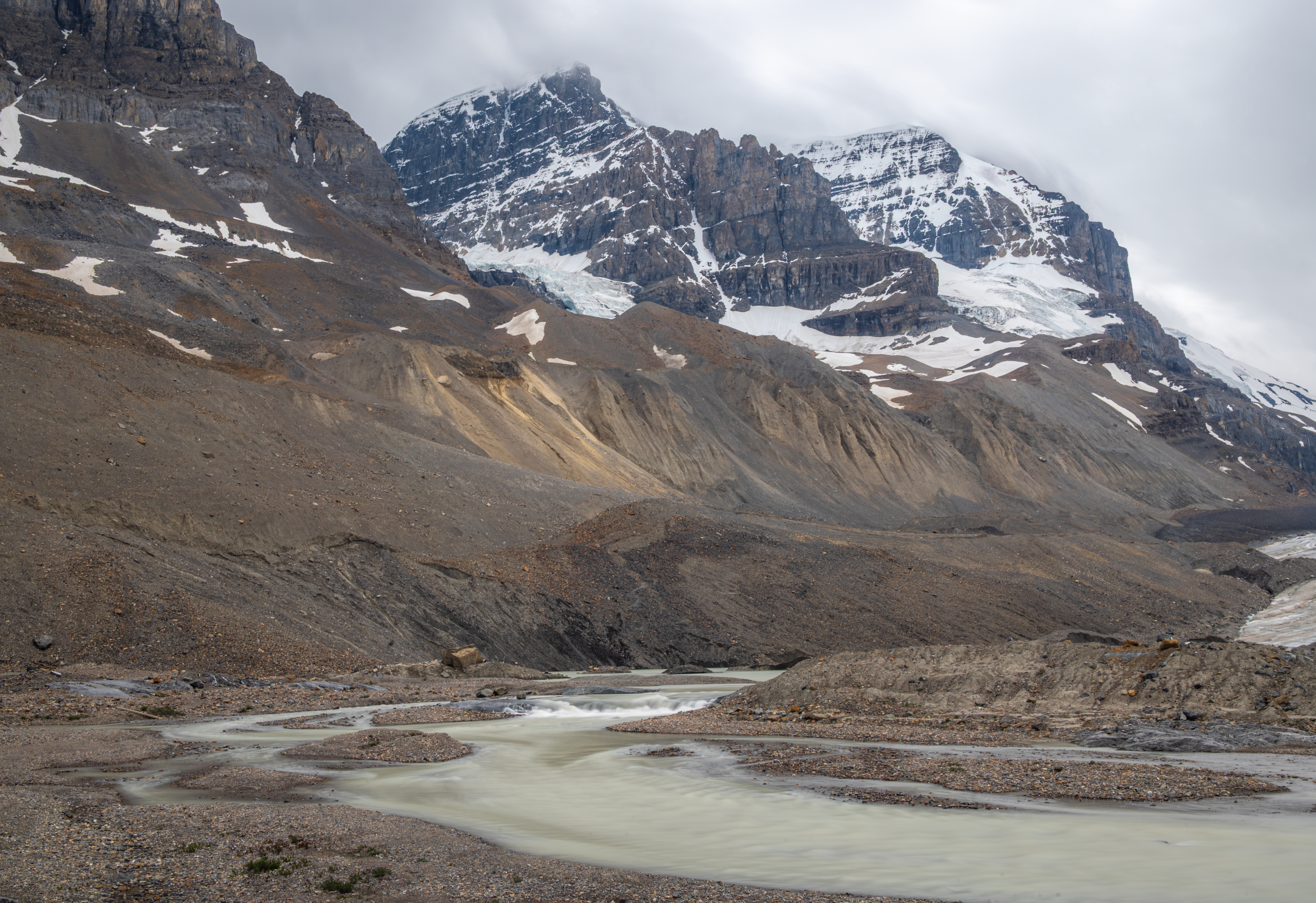
- Meltwater from the Athabasca Glacier

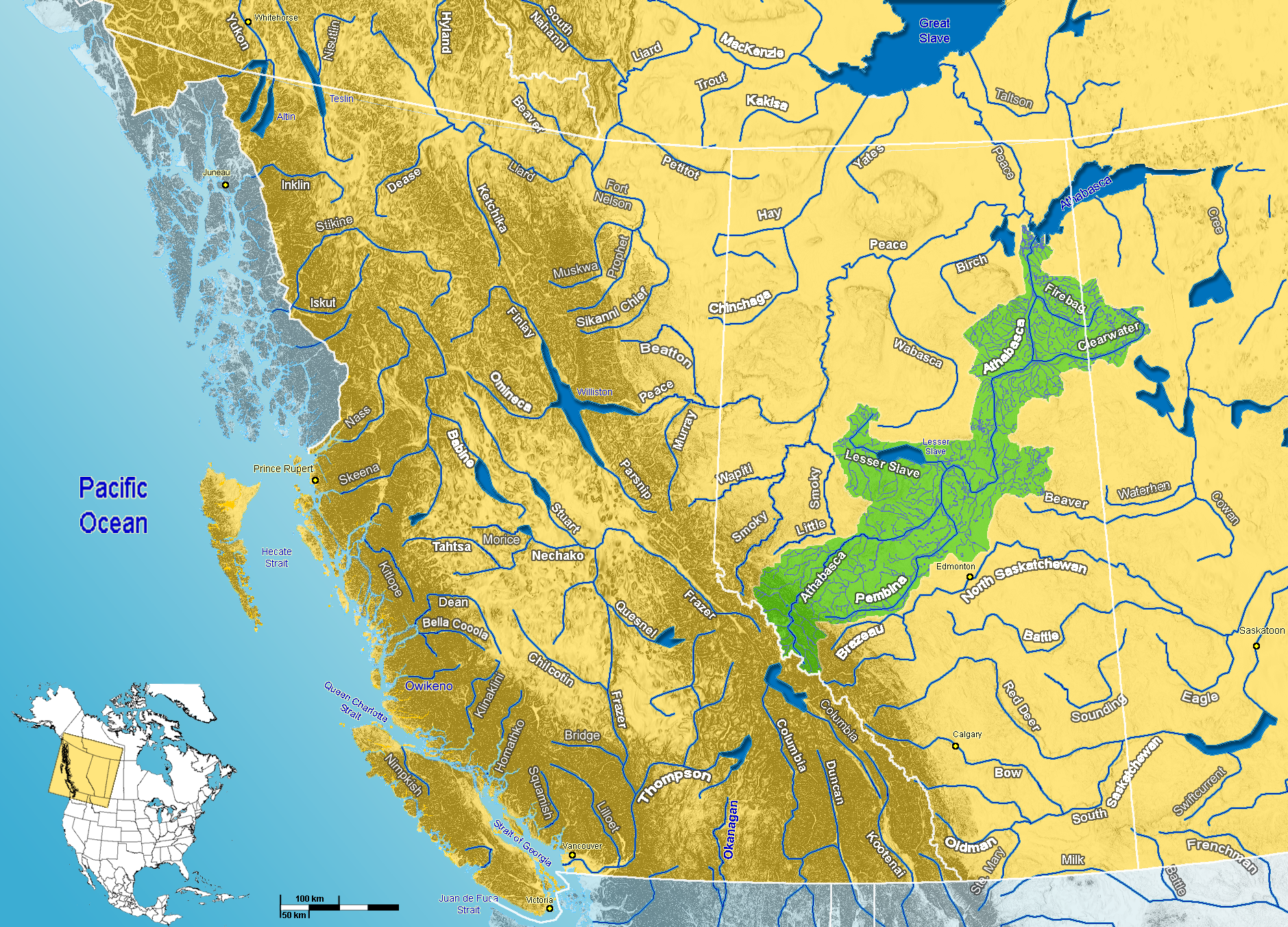
- Athabasca River watershed in western Canada

Location
- Country: Canada
- Province: Alberta

Physical characteristics
- Source: Columbia Icefield
  - location: Jasper National Park
  - coordinates: 52°10′4″N 117°25′50″W
  - elevation: 1,520 m (4,990 ft)(foot of glacier)
- Mouth: Lake Athabasca
  - coordinates: 58°37′35″N 110°50′5″W
  - elevation: 205 m (673 ft)
- Length: 1,231 km (765 mi)
- Basin size: 95,300 km^{2} (36,800 sq mi)
- Discharge
  - location: Athabasca Delta
  - average: 783 m^{3}/s (27,700 cu ft/s)
  - minimum: 75.0 m^{3}/s (2,650 cu ft/s)
  - maximum: 4,790 m^{3}/s (169,000 cu ft/s)

Basin features
- Waterfalls: Athabasca Falls

The Athabasca River (French: Rivière Athabasca) in Alberta, Canada, originates at the Columbia Icefield in Jasper National Park and flows more than 1,231 km (765 mi) before emptying into Lake Athabasca. Much of the land along its banks is protected in national and provincial parks, and the river is designated a Canadian heritage river for its historical and cultural importance. The scenic Athabasca Falls is located about 30 km (19 mi) upstream from Jasper.

== Etymology ==
The name Athabasca comes from the Woods Cree word ᐊᖬᐸᐢᑳᐤ aðapaskāw, which means "[where] there are plants one after another", likely a reference to the spotty vegetation along the river.

== Course ==
The Athabasca River originates in Jasper National Park, in Lake Providence at the toe of the Columbia Glacier within the Columbia Icefield, between Mount Columbia, Snow Dome, and the Winston Churchill Range, at an elevation of approximately 1,600 metres (5,200 ft). It travels 1,231 km (765 mi) before draining into the Peace-Athabasca Delta near Lake Athabasca south of Fort Chipewyan. From there, its waters flow north as Rivière des Rochers, then join the Peace River to form the Slave River, which empties into the Great Slave Lake and discharges through the Mackenzie River system into the Arctic Ocean. The cumulative drainage area is 95,300 km^{2} (36,800 sq mi).

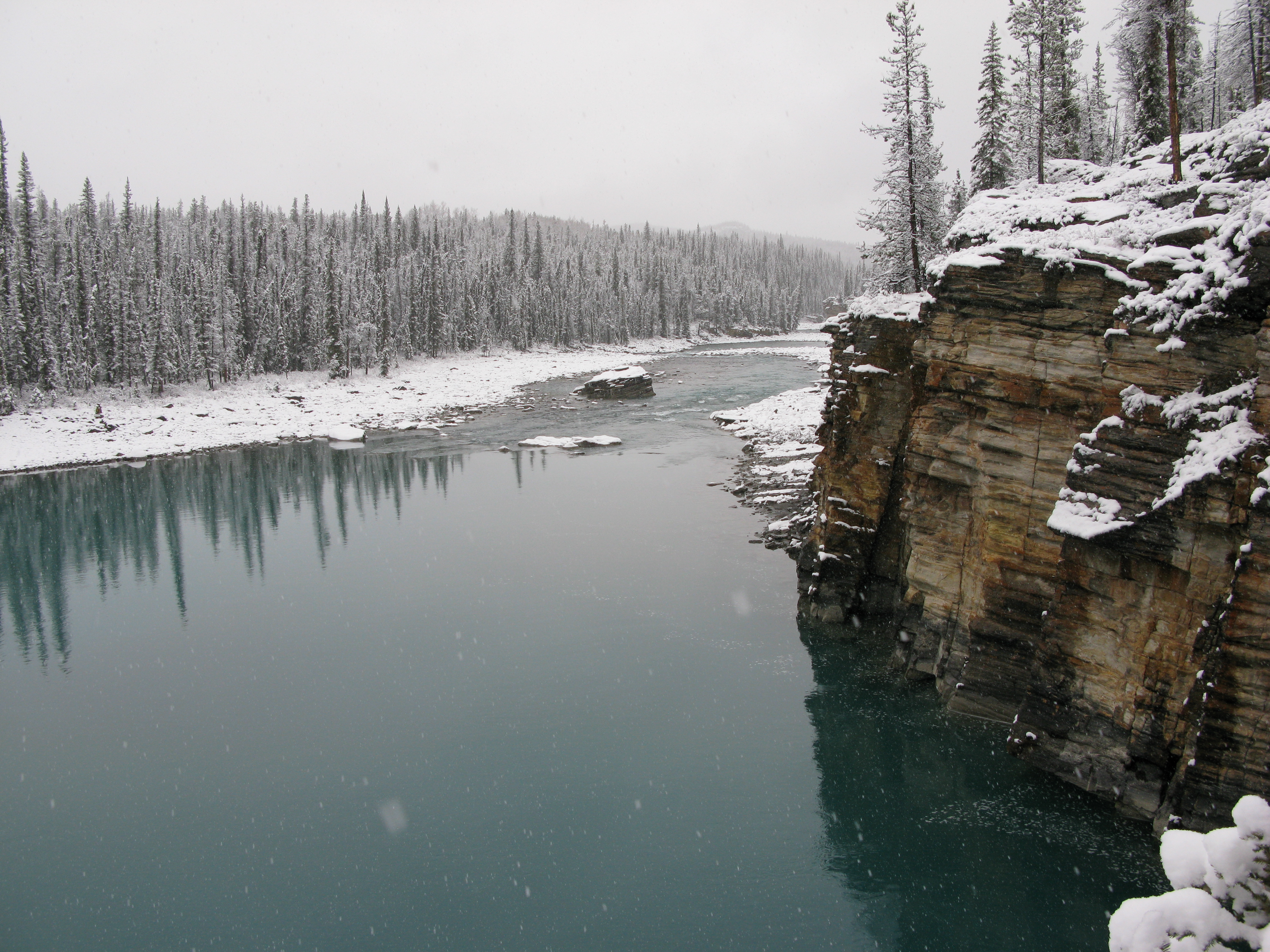
Athabasca River in Jasper National Park

The river flows along icefields and through gorges, offering wildlife habitat on its shores and in adjacent marshes. Throughout its course, it flows through or adjacent to numerous national and provincial parks, including Jasper National Park, Fort Assiniboine Sandhills Wildland Provincial Park, Hubert Lake Wildland Provincial Park, La Biche River Wildland Provincial Park, Grand Rapids Wildland Provincial Park, Richardson Wildland Provincial Park, and Wood Buffalo National Park. Its course is marked by rapids, impeding navigation southwest of Fort McMurray.

Numerous communities are on the banks of the Athabasca River, including Jasper, Brule, Entrance, Hinton, Whitecourt, Fort Assiniboine, Smith, Athabasca, Fort McMurray, and Fort McKay.

There are several crossings of the Athabasca River that are in use.

=== Tributaries ===
Alberta's Rockies

- Habel Creek
- Warwick Creek
- Quincy Creek
- Chaba River
- Dragon Creek
- Sunwapta River
- Ranger Creek
- Fryatt Creek
  - Lick Creek
- Geraldine Lakes
- Kerkeslin Creek
- Hardisty Creek
- Whirlpool River
- Astoria River
- Portal Creek
- Wabasso Creek
- Whistlers Creek
- Tekerra Creek
- Miette River
- Pyramid Lake
- Maligne River
- Garonne Creek
- Snaring River
- Morro Creek
- Cobblestone Creek
- Corral Creek
- Jacques Creek
- Rocky River
- Snake Indian River
- Mountain Creek
- Fiddle River
- Supply Creek
- Oldhouse Creek
- Prine Creek
- Maskuta Creek

Central Alberta

- Hardisty Creek
- Fish Creek
- Cache Petotte Creek
- Tiecamp Creek
- Canyon Creek
- Ponoka Creek
- Plante Creek
  - Apetowun Creek
- Obed Creek
- Oldman Creek
- Nosehill Creek
- Jackpine Creek
- Berland River
  - Wildhay River
- Beaver Creek
- Marsh Head Creek
- Pine Creek
- Pass Creek
- Two Creek
- Windfall Creek
- Chickadee Creek
- Bessie Creek
- Stony Creek
- Sakwatamau River
- McLeod River

Northern Alberta

- Freeman River
- Timeu Creek
- Pembina River
- Lesser Slave River
- Lawrence Lake Creek
- Baptiste Lake Creek
- Tawatinaw River
- La Biche River
- Calling River
- McMillan Lake Creek
- Parallel Creek
- Pelican River
- House River
- Horse River
- Clearwater River
- Steepbank River
- Muskeg River
- Mackay River
- Ells River
- Firebag River
- Richardson River

== History ==
Sekani, Shuswap, Kootenay, Salish, Stoney, and Cree tribes hunted and fished along the river prior to European colonization in the 18th century. From about 1778, the Athabasca River, the Clearwater River, which enters the Athabasca River from the east at Fort McMurray, and the Methye Portage were part of a primary fur trade route from the Mackenzie River to the Great Lakes (see Canadian Canoe Routes (early)).

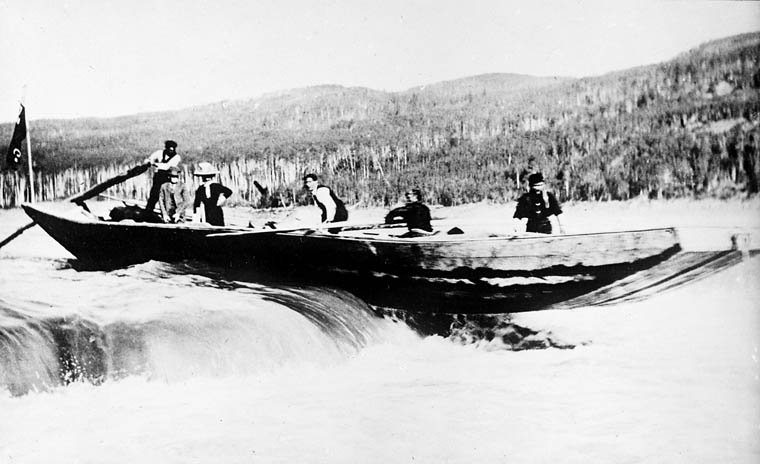
A Hudson's Bay Company scow in the Athabasca River, c. 1910

David Thompson and Thomas the Iroquois traveled through Athabasca Pass in 1811. In 1862, the Athabasca Springs area was crossed during the Cariboo Gold Rush by the Overlander Party.

The northern segment of the Athabasca River became part of a major shipping network in 1921 when the Alberta and Great Waterways Railway reached Waterways near Fort McMurray, making it the northernmost point on the North American railroad grid at that time. Cargo for destinations farther north was shipped to Waterways and transferred to barges, after which fleets of tugboats took them up the river to destinations in the Athabasca and Mackenzie River watersheds. Barge traffic declined after 1964 when Hay River, on the Great Slave Lake in the Northwest Territories, became the northern terminus of the rail grid.

== Environmental concerns ==
Owing to its proximity to the Athabasca oil sands, the river has seen significant amounts of energy infrastructure constructed along its course. On June 6, 1970, a pipeline operated by Great Canadian Oil Sands, the precursor to Suncor and the earliest commercial extraction operation, ruptured near the banks of the river. The total spill volume was estimated by Great Canadian Oil Sands at approximately 1,190 barrels (189 m^{3}).

In 2012, an independent study concluded that the Athabasca River contained elevated levels of pollution downstream of the Athabasca oil sands. Testing showed this portion of the river contained mercury, lead, and 11 other toxic elements.

In 2021, another independent research was conducted on the streamflow and climate data sets for the Athabasca River Basin showing the seasonality of the streamflow and precipitation time series via wavelet analysis. The seasonal components of these time series were shown to be coherent with phase discrepancy. The mean temperature had been gradually increasing since 1960, and it was projected to increase by approximately 2 °C during the mid-century, possibly reducing the snowpack volume during the spring.

=== Coal mine spill ===
On October 31, 2013, a pit at the Obed Mountain coal mine spilled, and between 600 million and a billion litres of slurry poured into Plante and Apetowun Creeks. The plume of waste products then joined the Athabasca River, travelling downstream for a month before settling in Lake Athabasca near Fort Chipewyan, over 500 km (310 mi) away.

== Heritage ==
The river was designated a Canadian heritage river for its importance to the fur trade and the construction of railways and roads opening up the Canadian West, as well as for its natural heritage.

The Canadian Heraldic Authority named the position of Athabaska Herald after the river.

== Recreation ==
Sections of the Athabasca River are used for commercial class II whitewater rafting, particularly in the Jasper National Park area. Rafting activities on the river range from scenic float trips to moderate whitewater sections, depending on location, seasonal water levels, and river flow conditions.

Commercial rafting on the Athabasca River is regulated by Parks Canada and typically operates during the summer months when conditions are suitable. Licensed outfitters provide guided trips that emphasize river safety, environmental stewardship, and interpretation of the surrounding Canadian Rockies landscape.

Examples of operators offering guided rafting experiences on the Athabasca River include Jasper Rafting Adventures and Rocky Mountain River Guides, which operate trips departing from the Jasper area.

== Gallery ==
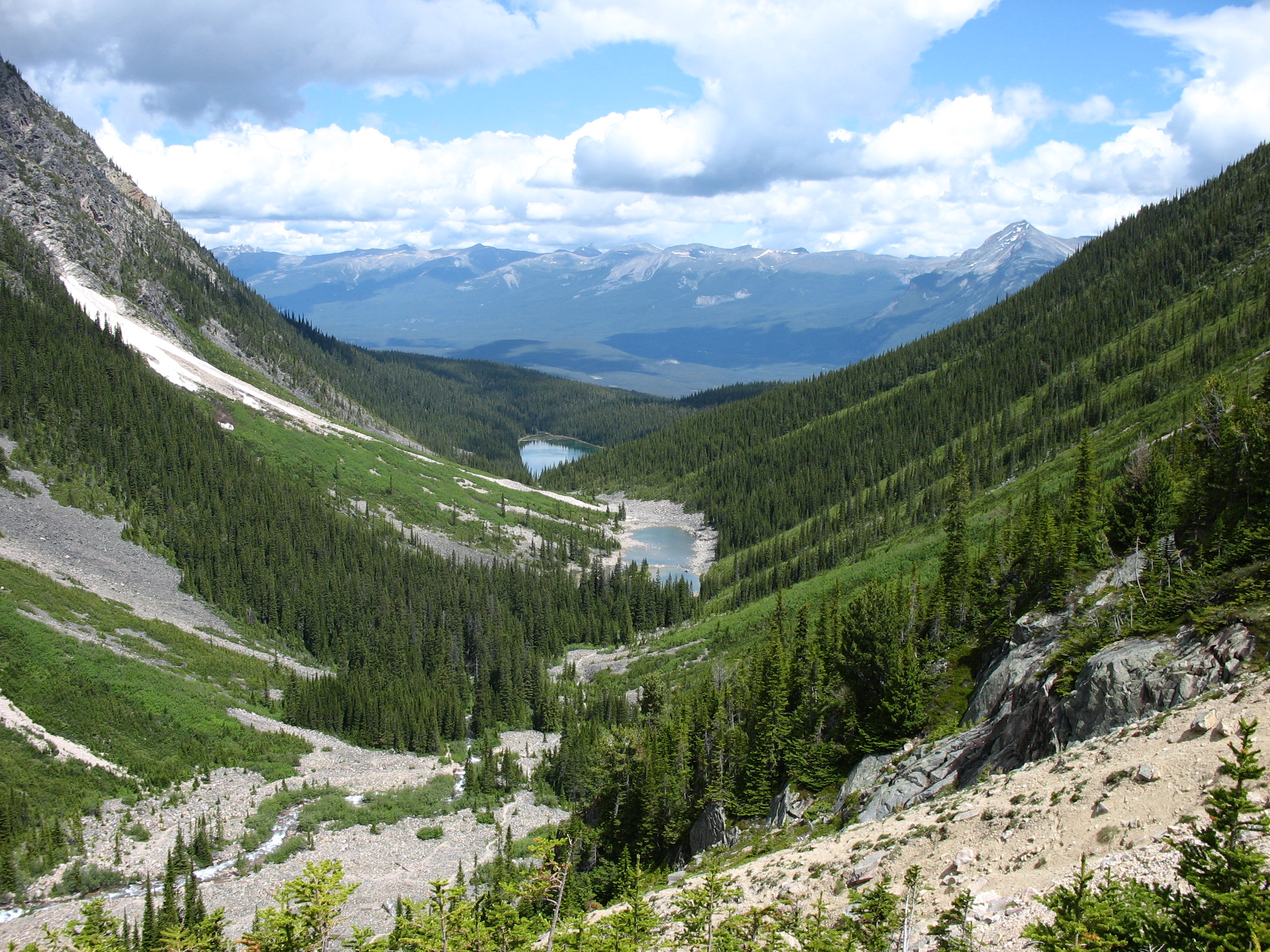
Athabasca River Valley seen from the Geraldine Lakes

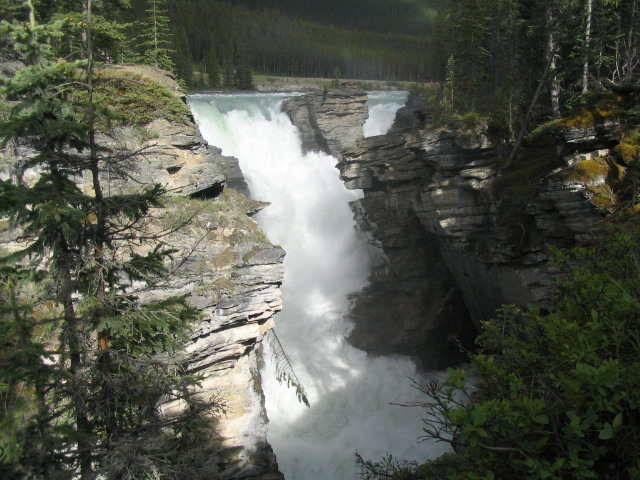
Flowing through the Athabasca Falls

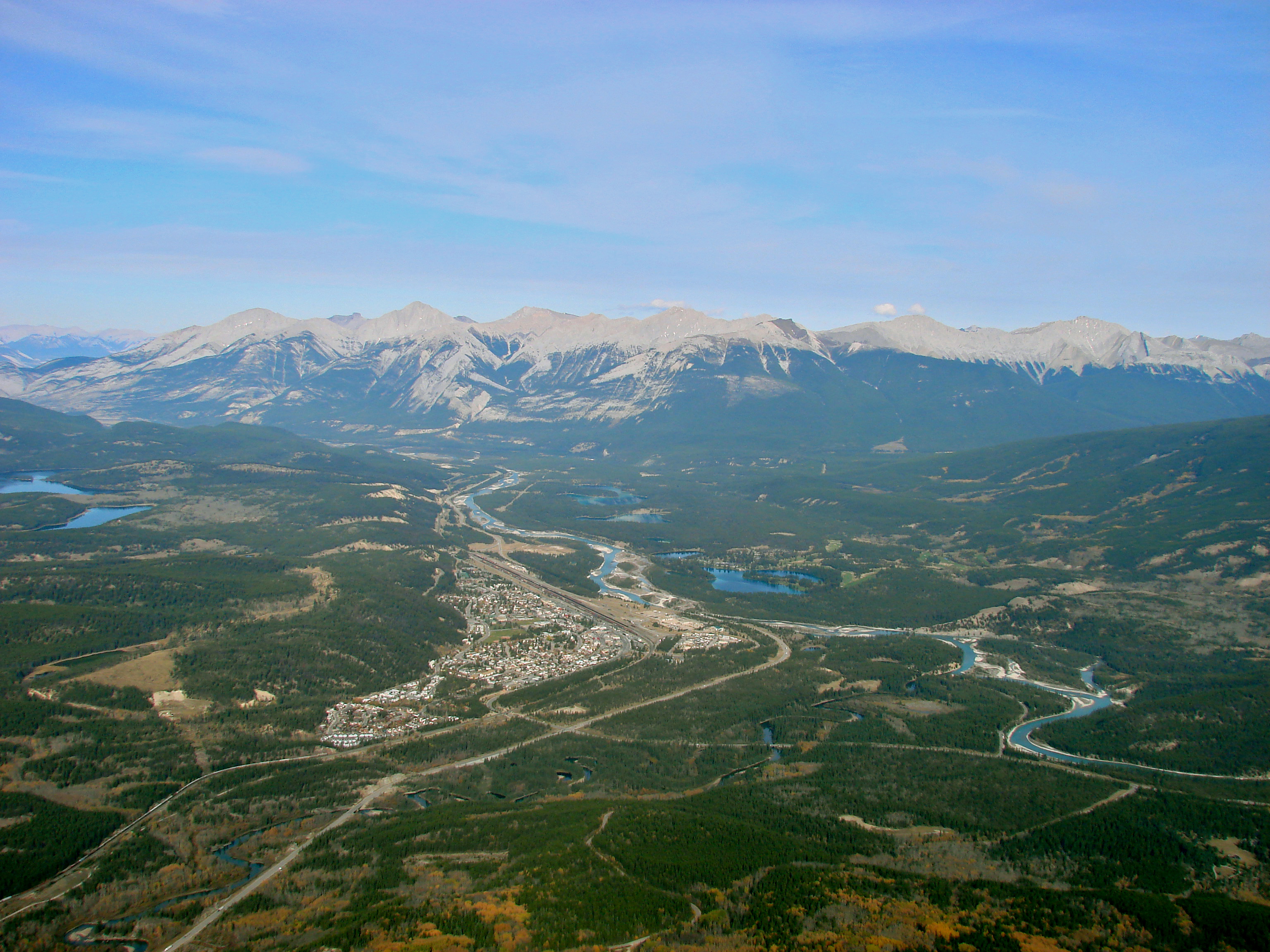
Passing by Jasper

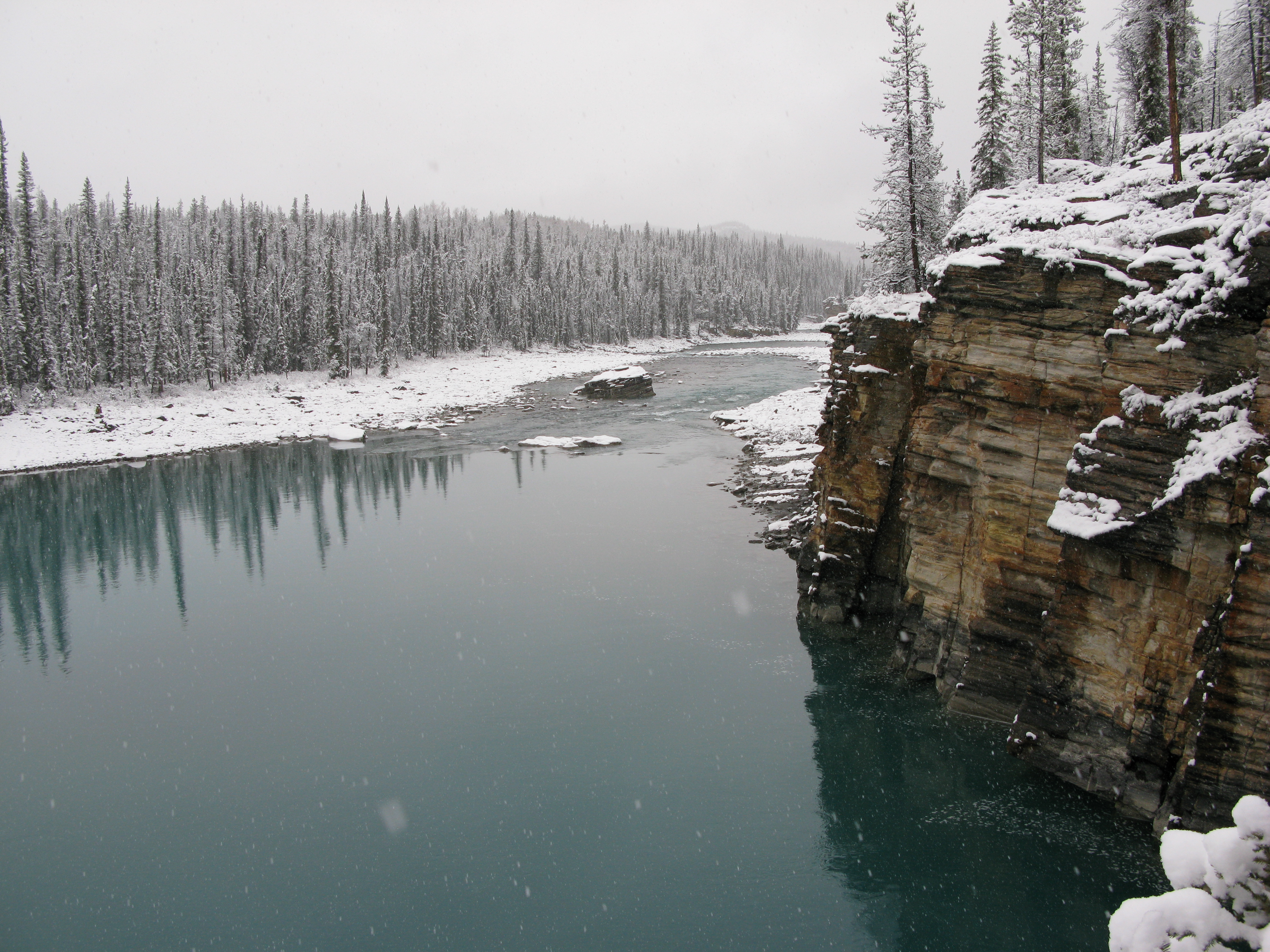
In Jasper National Park

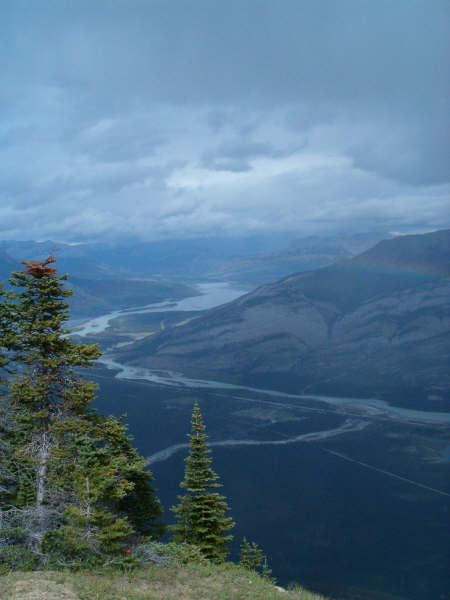
Athabasca River valley from the Pallisades fire lookout

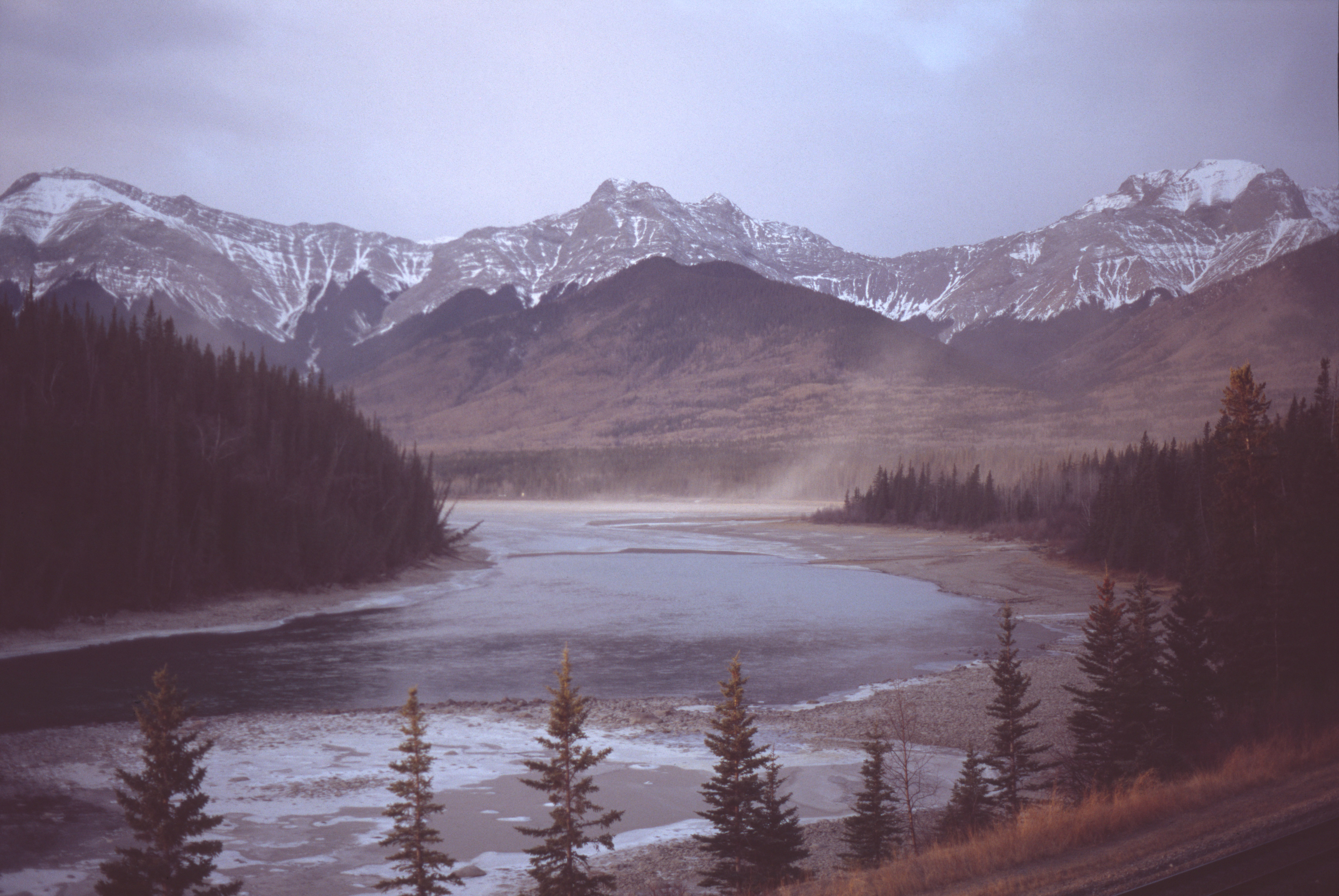
Athabasca River at the mouth of Brûlé Lake

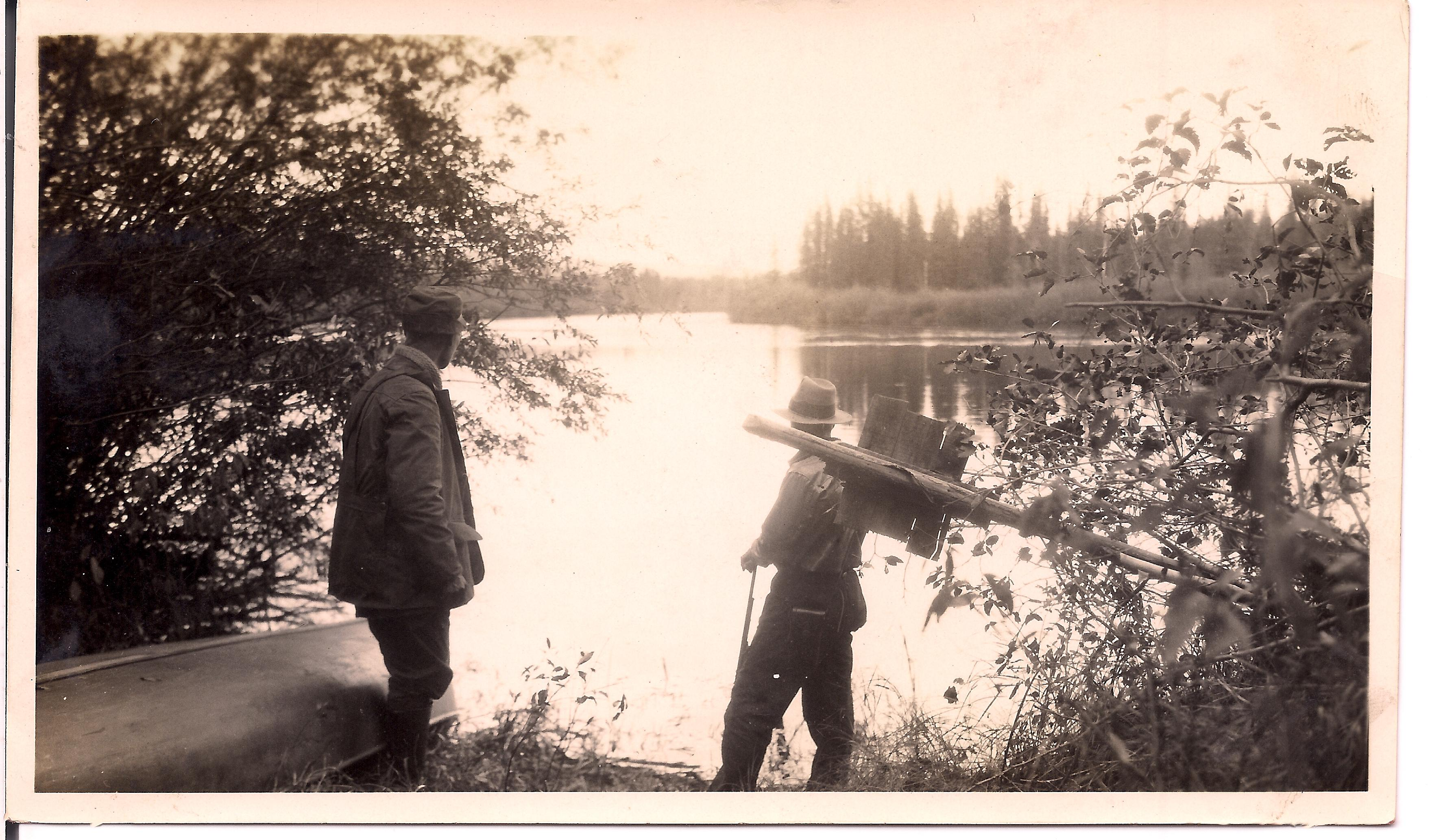
Dr. Karl Clark and guide Romeo Eymundson on the bank of the Athabasca River.

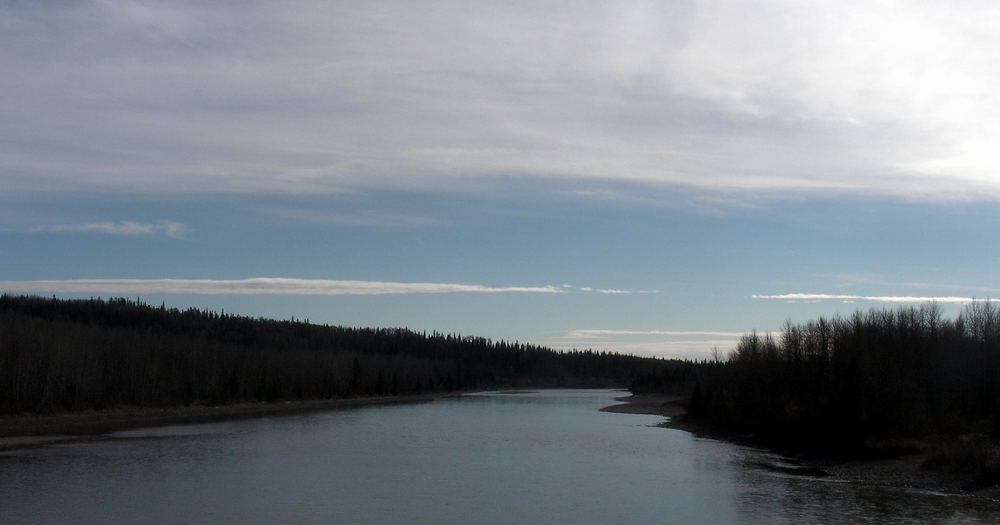
Upstream from Whitecourt

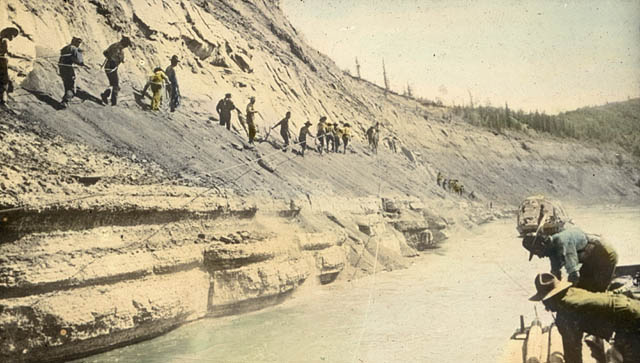
Bituminous sand banks north of Fort McMurray

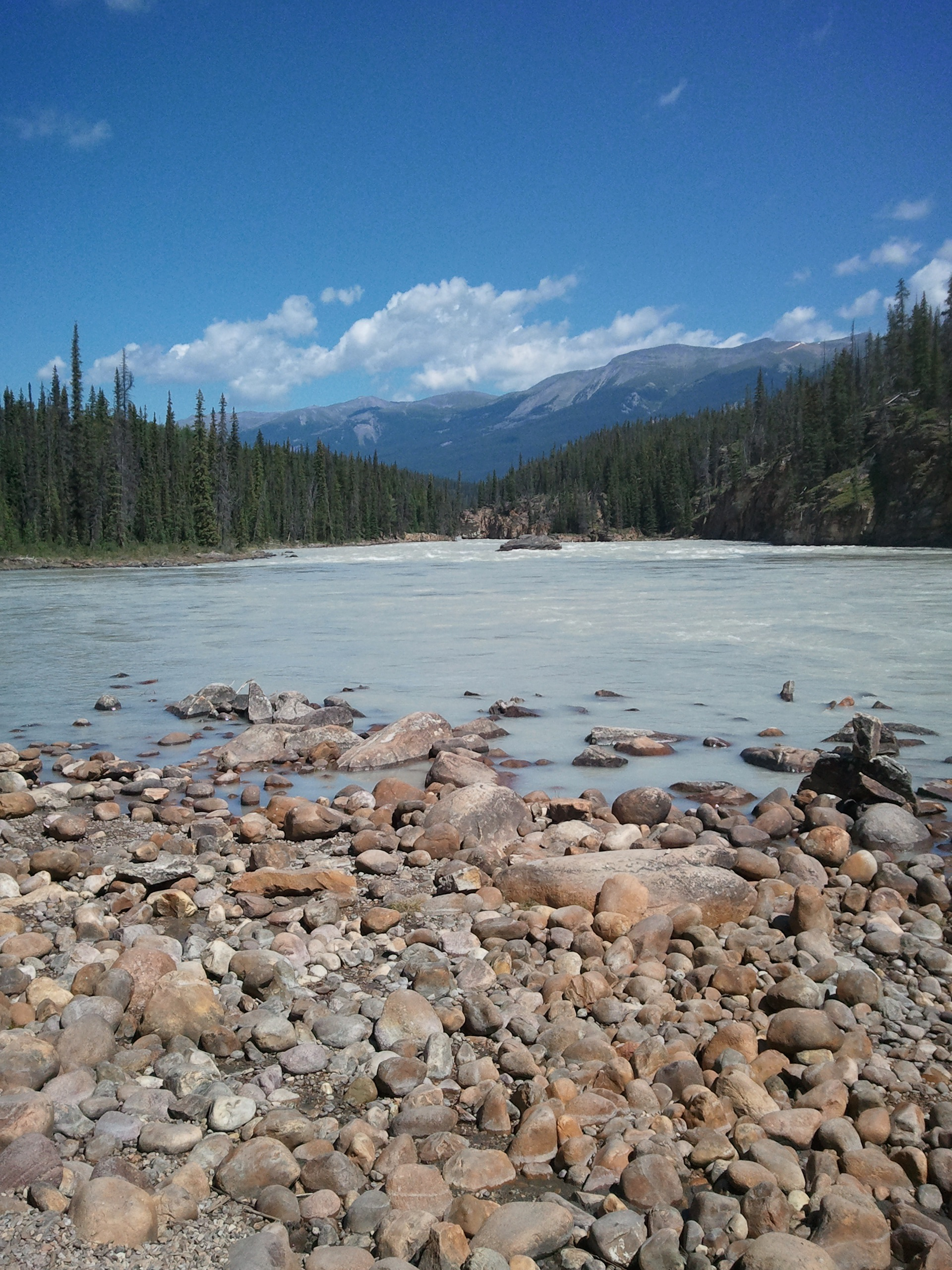
Athabasca River in July, 2013

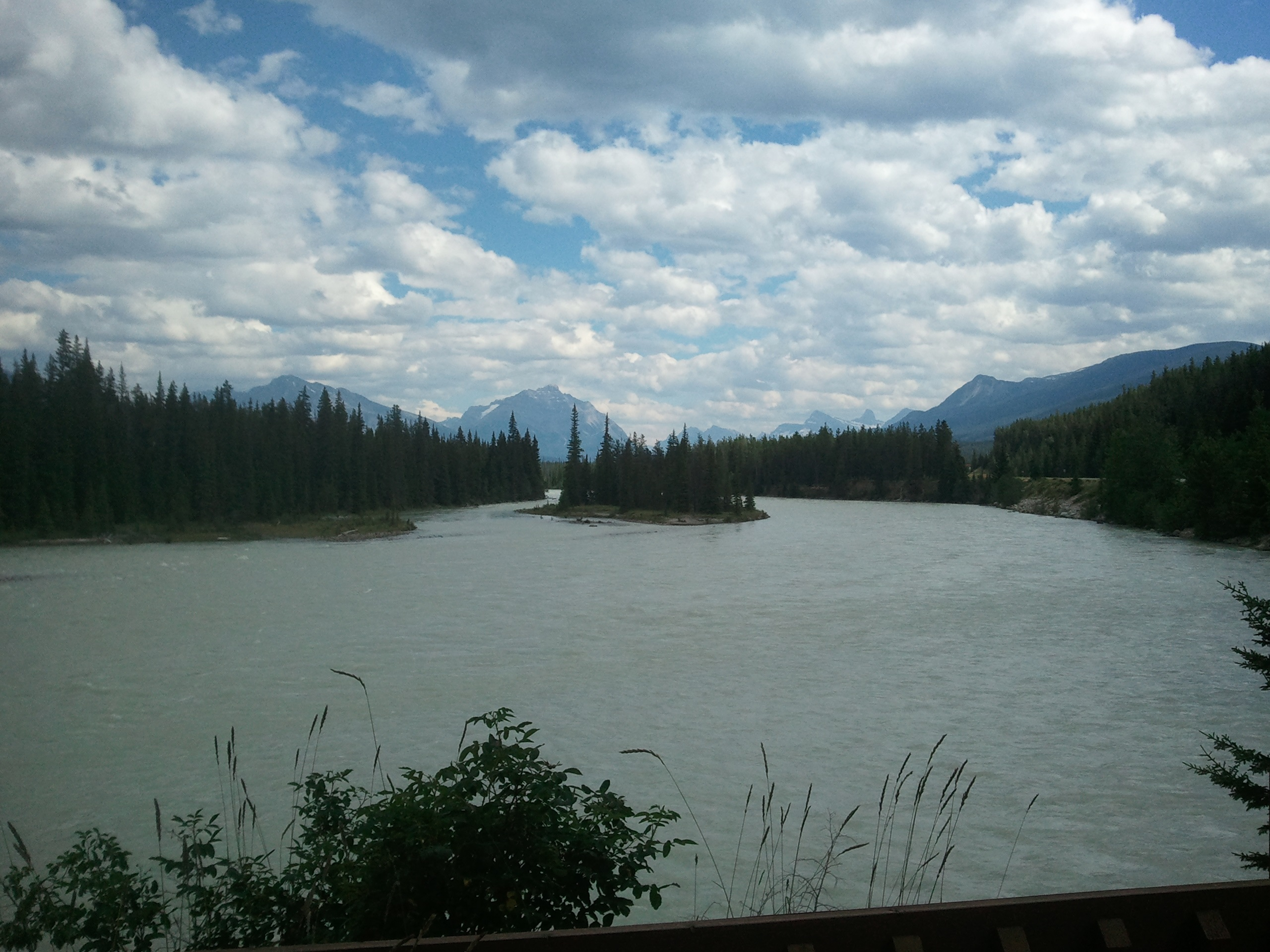
Athabasca River in Jasper

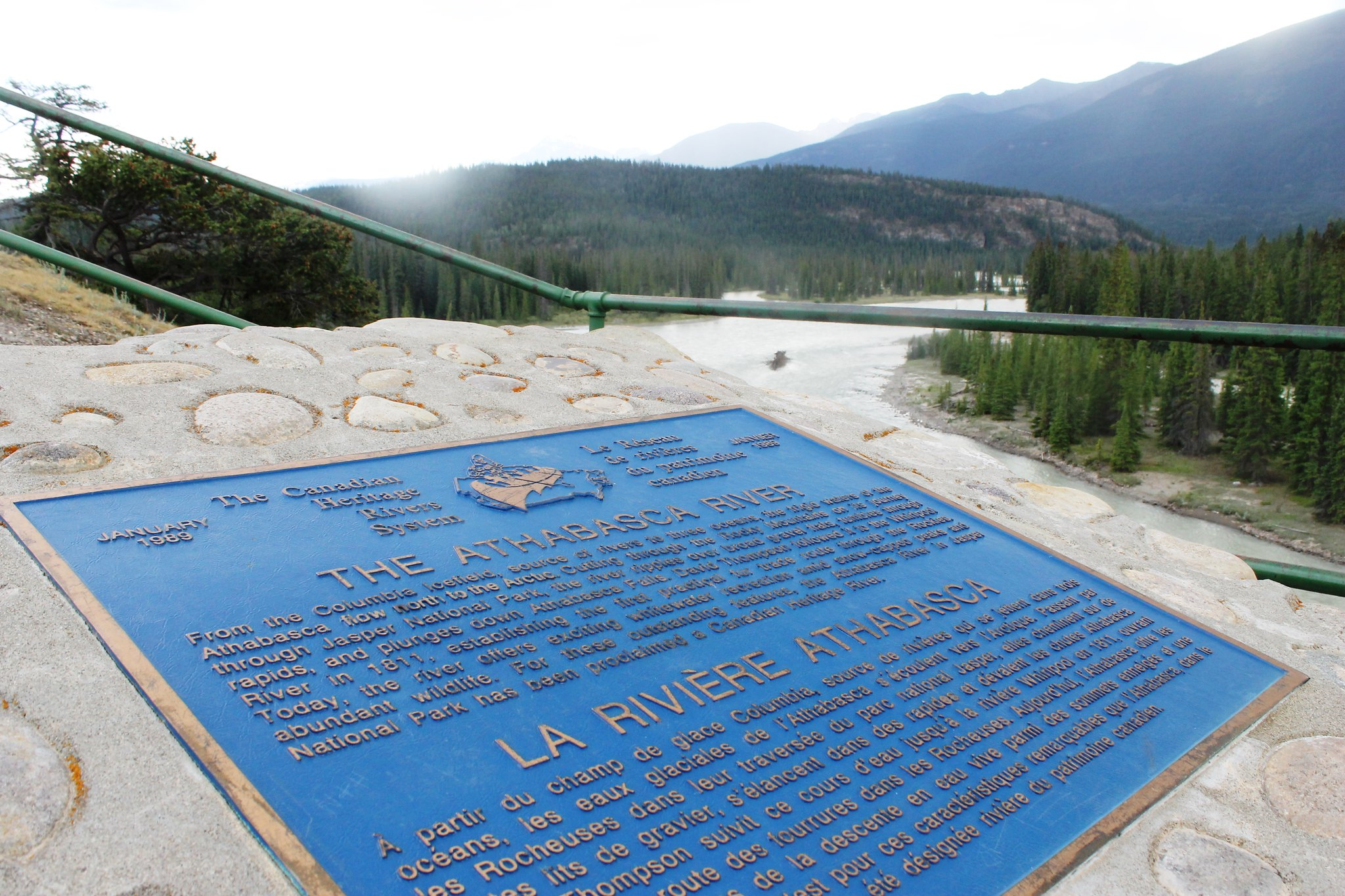
Plaque overlooking the river in Jasper National Park, 2015

== See also ==
- Geography of Alberta
- List of Alberta rivers
- List of longest rivers of Canada
