= Entrance, Alberta =

Entrance
- Location of Entrance Alberta Entrance (Canada) Entrance (North America)
- Coordinates: 53.3736°N 117.6900°W

Entrance is an unincorporated community in central Alberta in Yellowhead County, located on Highway 40, 61 kilometres (38 mi) northeast of Jasper.

The community was named for the fact the site is a gateway to Jasper National Park.

== Climate ==
Climate data for Entrance Climate ID: 3062440; coordinates 53°22′N 117°42′W; elevation: 990.6 m (3,250 ft); 1981–2010 normals, extremes 1917-2006
Month	Jan	Feb	Mar	Apr	May	Jun	Jul	Aug	Sep	Oct	Nov	Dec	Year
Record high °C (°F)	22.2 (72.0)	19.0 (66.2)	22.0 (71.6)	27.8 (82.0)	33.9 (93.0)	34.4 (93.9)	37.8 (100.0)	34.4 (93.9)	34.0 (93.2)	29.4 (84.9)	21.1 (70.0)	17.8 (64.0)	37.8 (100.0)
Mean daily maximum °C (°F)	−3.3 (26.1)	1.1 (34.0)	5.1 (41.2)	11.5 (52.7)	16.3 (61.3)	20.0 (68.0)	22.2 (72.0)	21.7 (71.1)	17.1 (62.8)	10.4 (50.7)	1.8 (35.2)	−1.3 (29.7)	10.2 (50.4)
Daily mean °C (°F)	−9.2 (15.4)	−5.9 (21.4)	−2.2 (28.0)	3.9 (39.0)	8.4 (47.1)	12.3 (54.1)	14.4 (57.9)	13.6 (56.5)	9.2 (48.6)	3.9 (39.0)	−3.7 (25.3)	−7.0 (19.4)	3.1 (37.6)
Mean daily minimum °C (°F)	−15.0 (5.0)	−12.8 (9.0)	−9.5 (14.9)	−3.7 (25.3)	0.6 (33.1)	4.6 (40.3)	6.6 (43.9)	5.5 (41.9)	1.3 (34.3)	−2.7 (27.1)	−9.3 (15.3)	−12.6 (9.3)	−3.9 (25.0)
Record low °C (°F)	−51.2 (−60.2)	−47.0 (−52.6)	−42.8 (−45.0)	−35.6 (−32.1)	−13.5 (7.7)	−6.7 (19.9)	−2.8 (27.0)	−5.0 (23.0)	−19.4 (−2.9)	−27.0 (−16.6)	−39.0 (−38.2)	−47.2 (−53.0)	−51.2 (−60.2)
Average precipitation mm (inches)	24.3 (0.96)	12.9 (0.51)	22.1 (0.87)	25.9 (1.02)	62.5 (2.46)	76.3 (3.00)	94.0 (3.70)	73.9 (2.91)	46.3 (1.82)	33.1 (1.30)	22.1 (0.87)	14.4 (0.57)	507.9 (20.00)
Average rainfall mm (inches)	0.8 (0.03)	0.4 (0.02)	1.6 (0.06)	17.3 (0.68)	56.5 (2.22)	76.3 (3.00)	94.0 (3.70)	73.9 (2.91)	44.6 (1.76)	19.0 (0.75)	2.4 (0.09)	0.3 (0.01)	387.0 (15.24)
Average snowfall cm (inches)	23.5 (9.3)	12.5 (4.9)	20.5 (8.1)	8.6 (3.4)	6.0 (2.4)	0.0 (0.0)	0.0 (0.0)	0.1 (0.0)	1.6 (0.6)	14.2 (5.6)	19.7 (7.8)	14.2 (5.6)	120.9 (47.6)
Average precipitation days (≥ 0.2 mm)	5.8	4.2	6.5	6.6	11.3	13.0	12.6	12.8	11.1	6.4	5.9	4.7	100.9
Average rainy days (≥ 0.2 mm)	0.4	0.1	0.6	4.2	10.8	13.0	12.6	12.8	10.9	4.6	0.9	0.1	70.9
Average snowy days (≥ 0.2 cm)	5.5	4.1	6.1	3.0	1.3	0.0	0.0	0.0	0.5	2.7	5.3	4.6	33.0
Source: Environment and Climate Change Canada
