= Gordon Lake =

Gordon Lake or Lake Gordon may refer to:

- Gordon Lake (Alberta), a lake in Alberta, Canada
- Gordon Lake (Saskatchewan), a lake in Saskatchewan, Canada
- Gordon Lake (Ontario), a list of lakes in the Canadian province of Ontario
- Lake Gordon, a lake in Australia
