= List of protected areas of Alberta =

Alberta Parks

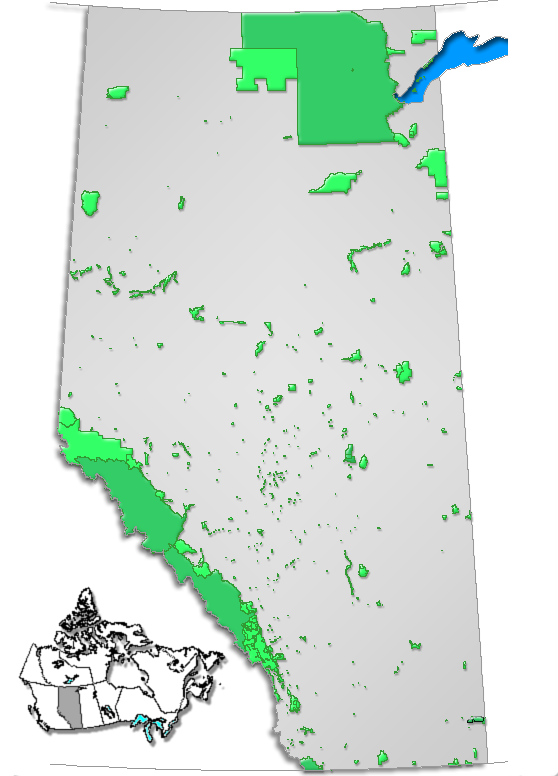
Location and extent of parks in Alberta
Type	Number	Area km^{2} (sq mi)
Provincial Parks	76	2,214 km^{2} (855 mi^{2})
Wildland Provincial Parks	31	17,314 km^{2} (6,685 mi^{2})
Provincial Recreation Areas	208	899 km^{2} (347 mi^{2})
Wilderness Areas	3	1,010 km^{2} (390 mi^{2})
Ecological Reserves	15	268 km^{2} (103 mi^{2})
Natural Areas	139	1,299 km^{2} (502 mi^{2})
Heritage Rangelands	2	120 km^{2} (46 mi^{2})
National Parks	5	63,045 km^{2} (24,342 mi^{2})
Total	476	90,747 km^{2} (35,038 mi^{2})

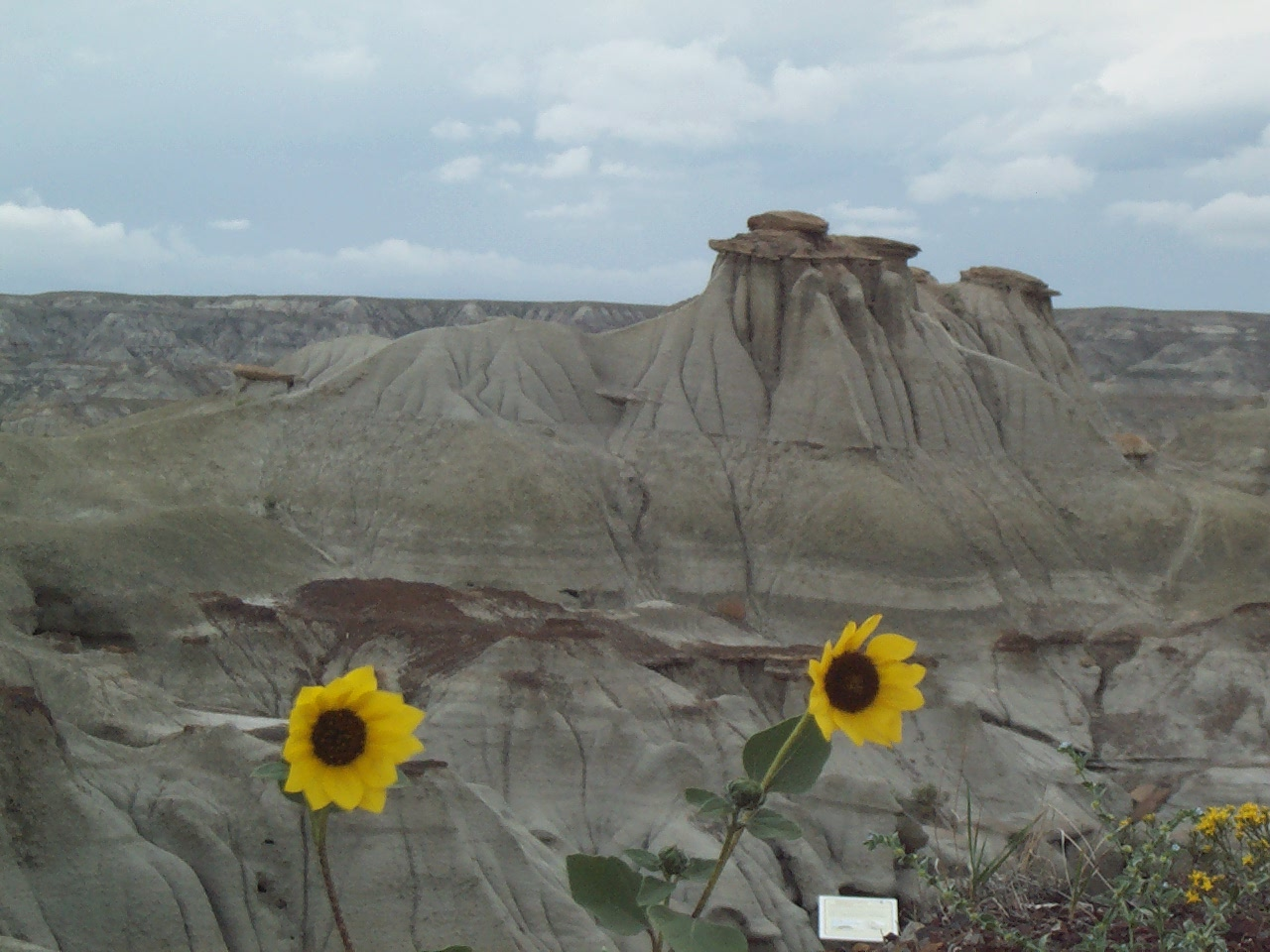
Dinosaur Provincial Park

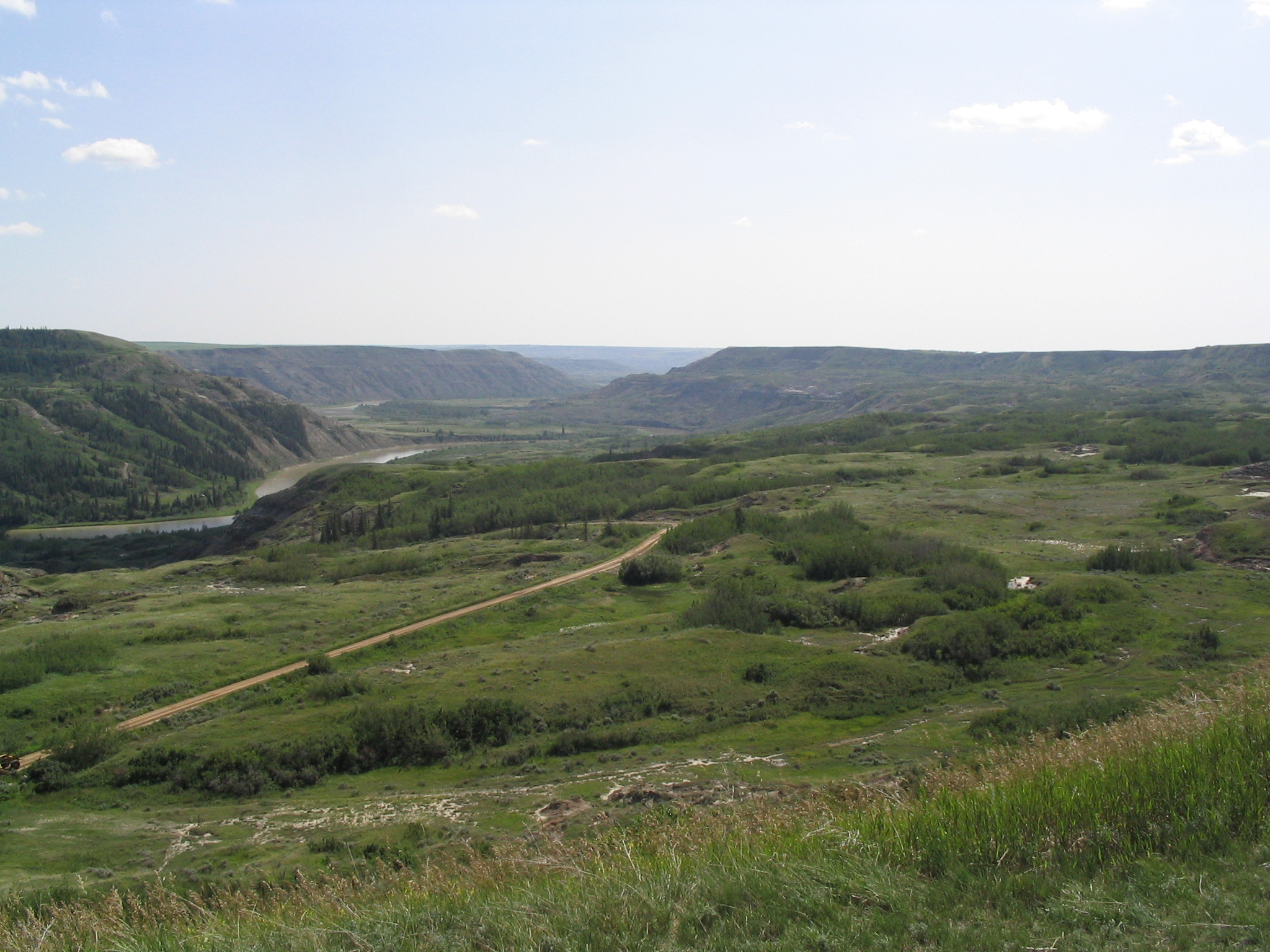
Dry Island Buffalo Jump Provincial Park

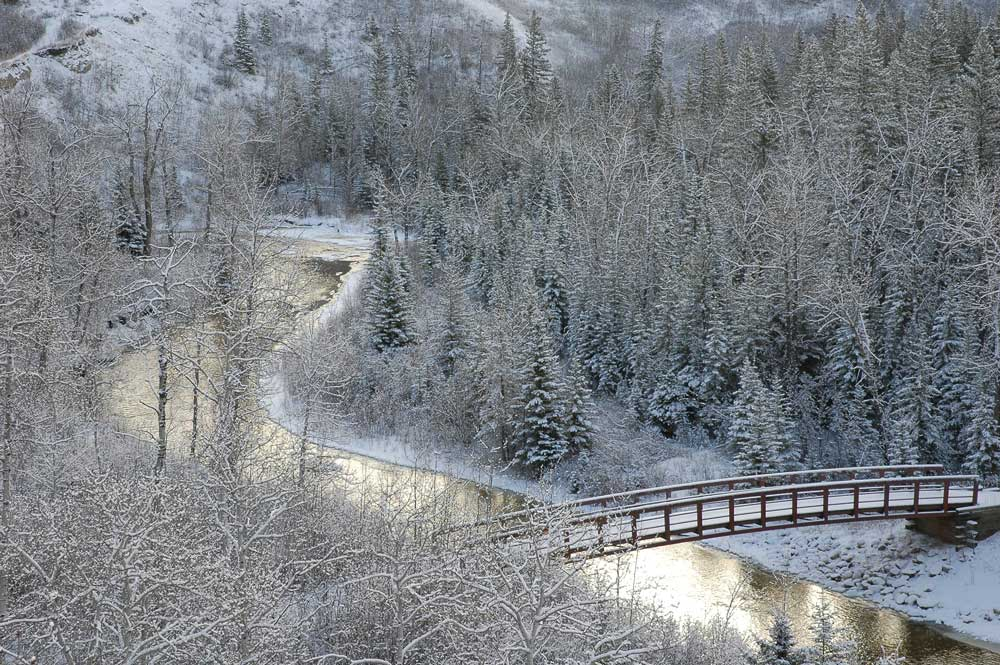
Fish Creek Provincial Park

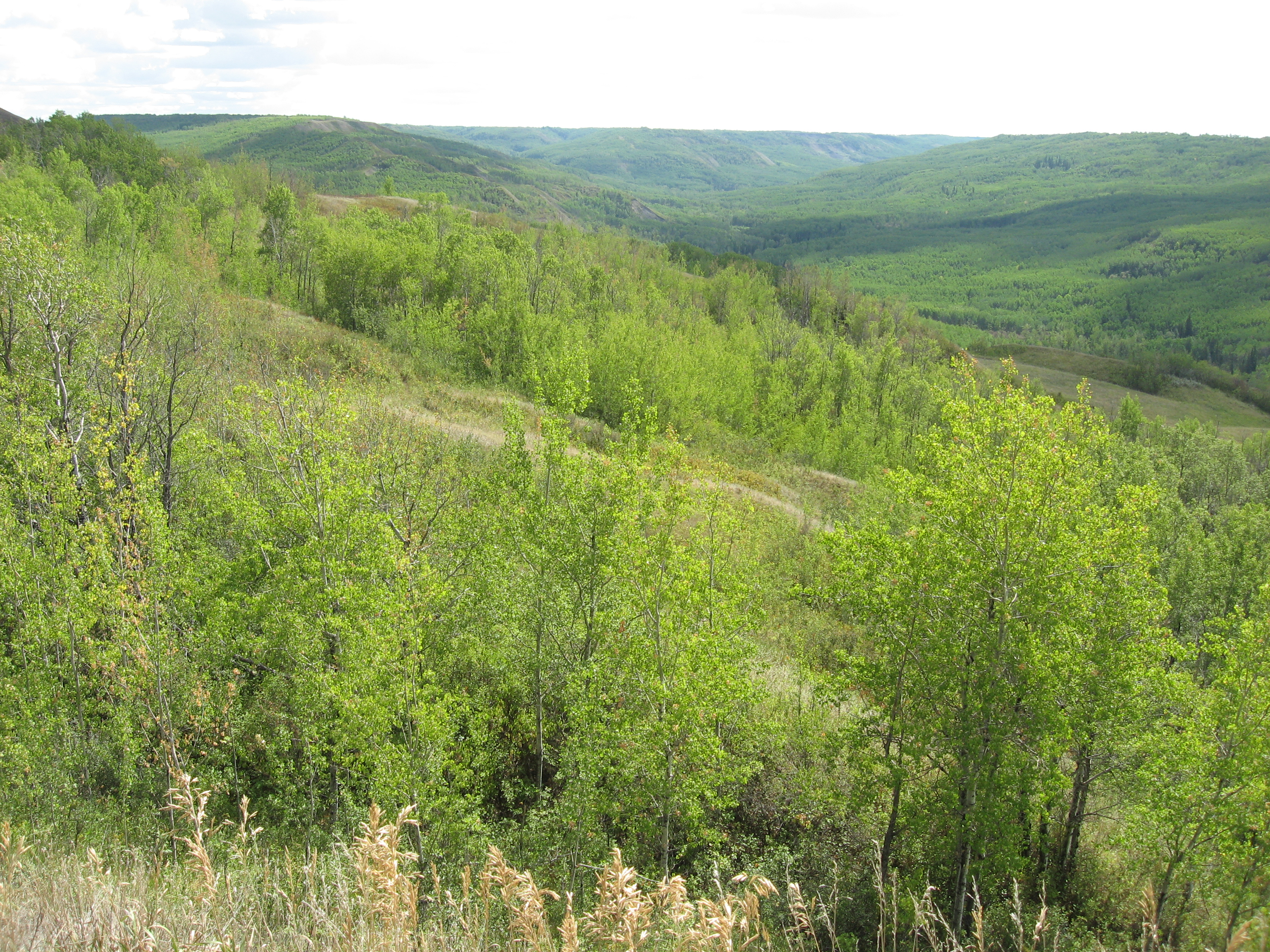
Greene Valley Provincial Park

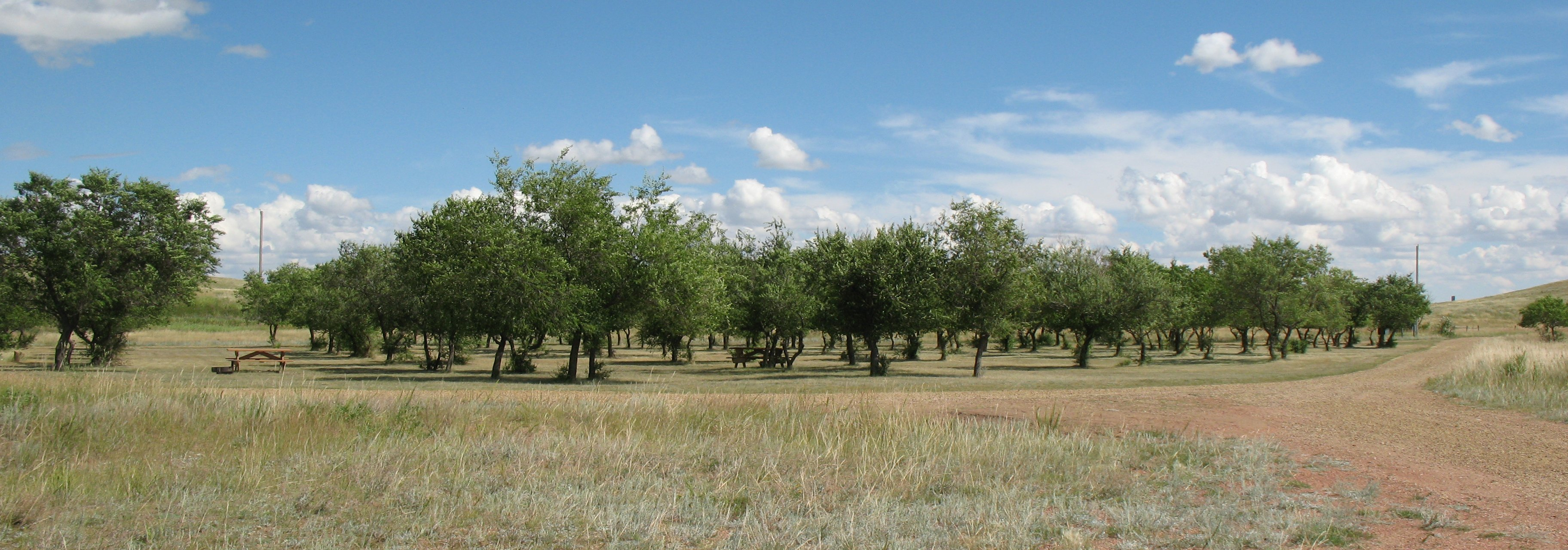
Little Fish Lake Provincial Park

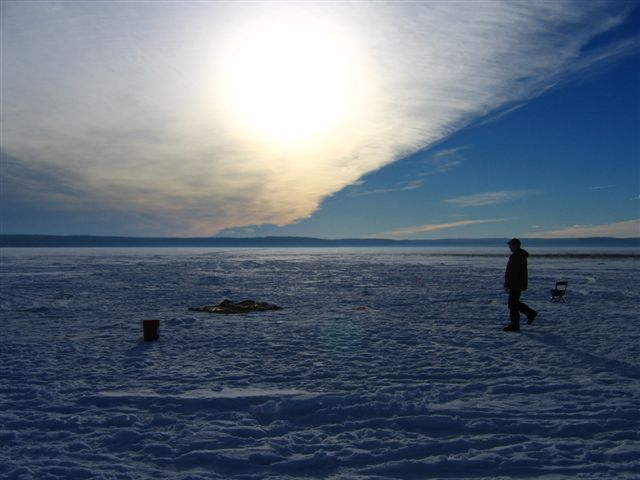
Lakeland Provincial Park

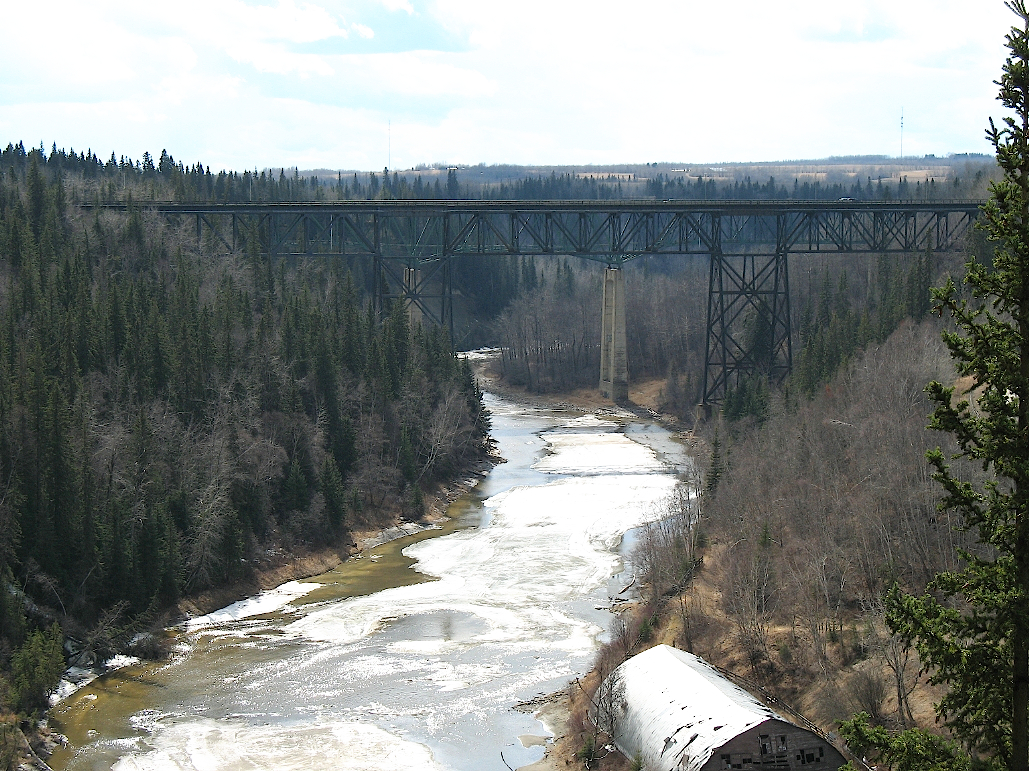
Pembina River Provincial Park

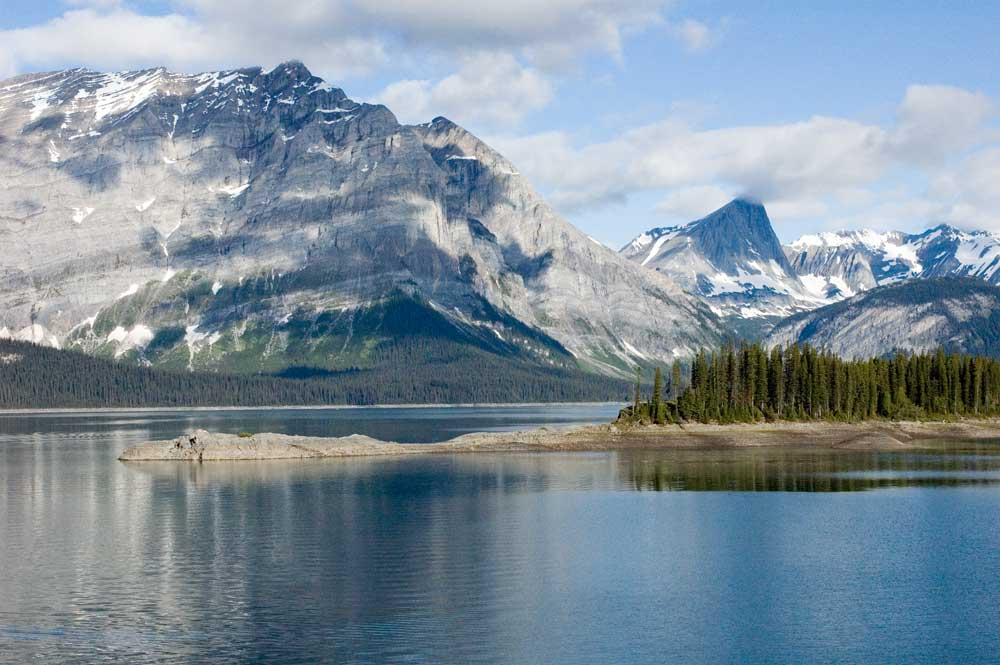
Peter Lougheed Provincial Park

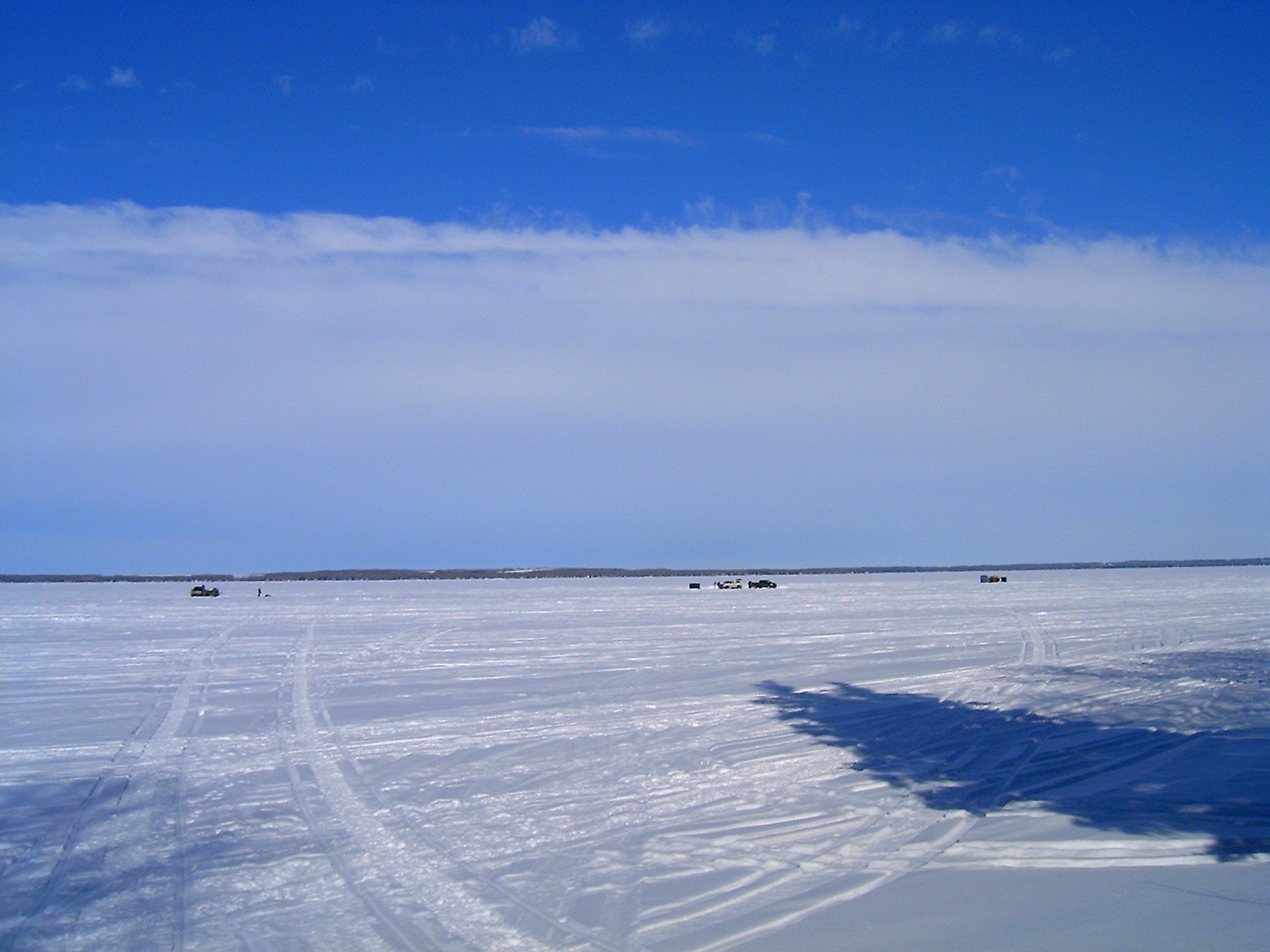
Pigeon Lake Provincial Park

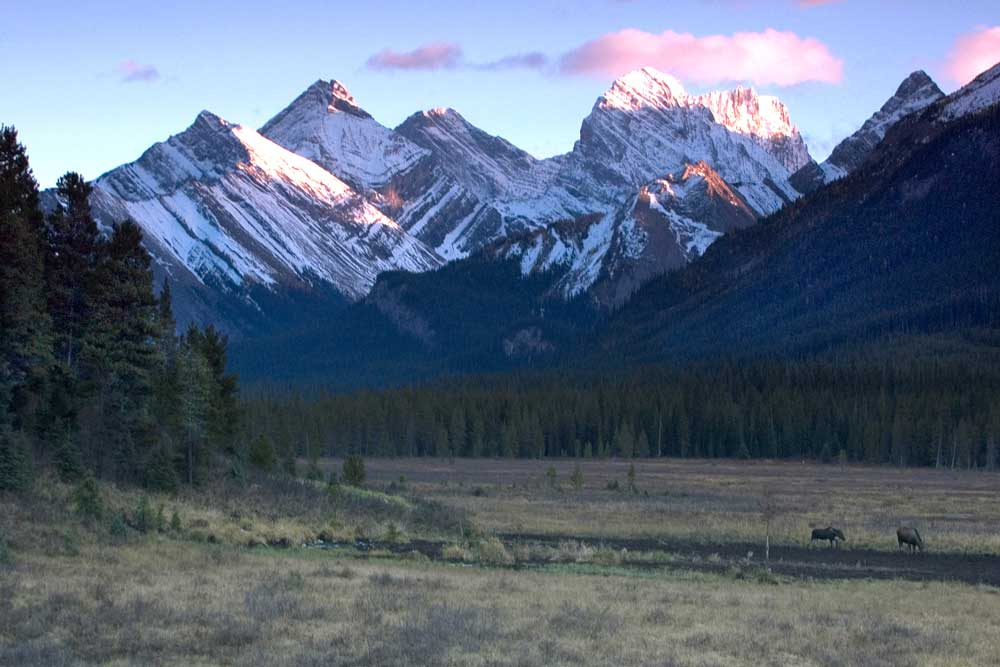
Spray Valley Provincial Park

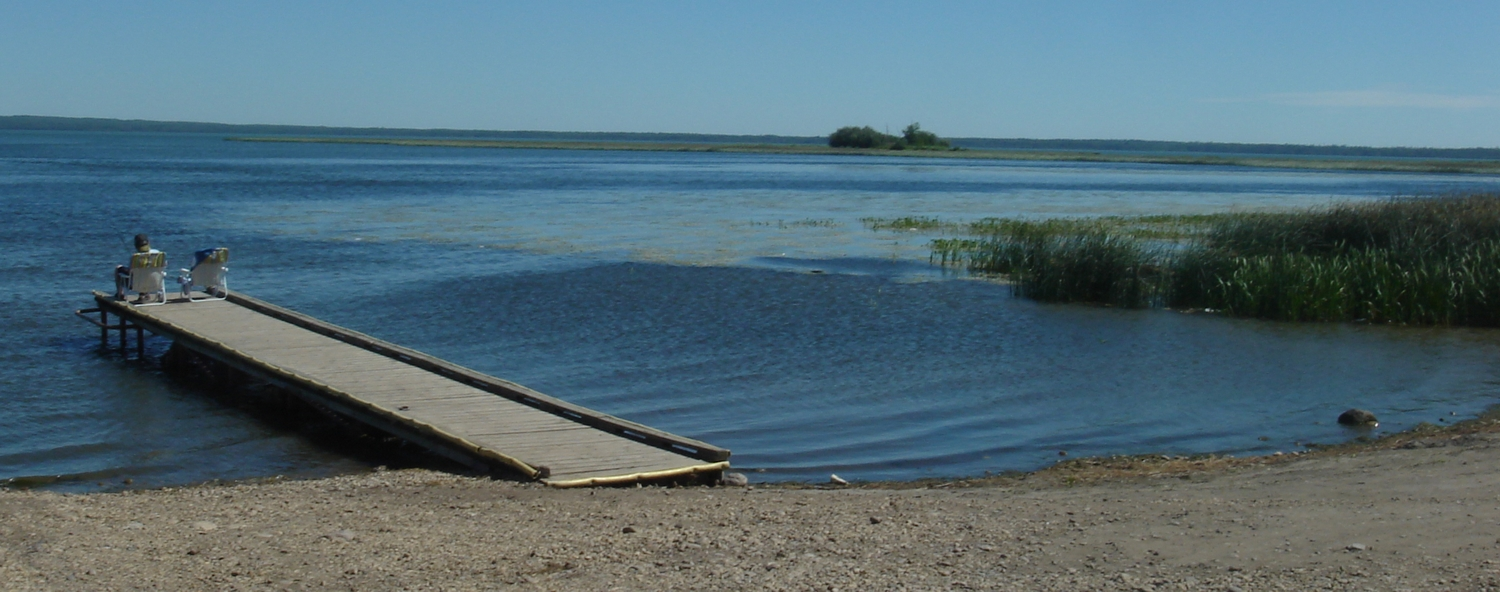
Williamson Provincial Park

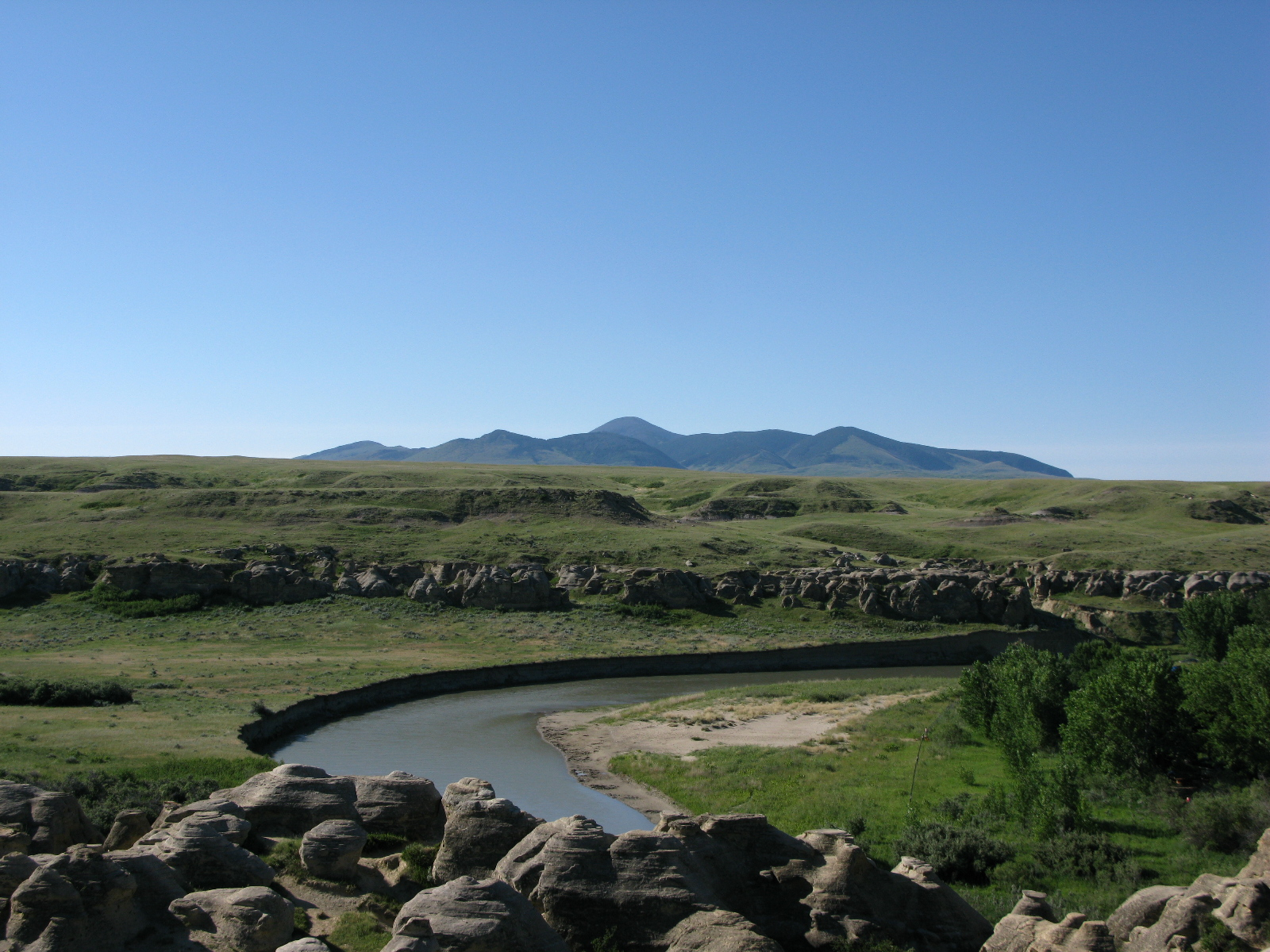
Writing-on-Stone Provincial Park

This is a list of protected areas of Alberta. Protected areas are managed by the Government of Canada or the Government of Alberta. The provincial government owns 60% of Alberta's landmass but most of this has not been formally protected. The total protected area throughout Alberta including federal and provincial protected areas is approximately 90,700 km^{2} (35,000 sq mi).

== International recognition ==
Six of Canada's 14 UNESCO World Heritage Sites are entirely or partially located in Alberta:

- Canadian Rocky Mountain Parks (shared with British Columbia)
- Dinosaur Provincial Park
- Head-Smashed-In Buffalo Jump
- Waterton-Glacier International Peace Park (shared with Montana, United States)
- Wood Buffalo National Park (shared with Northwest Territories)
- Writing-on-Stone Provincial Park

Alberta also contains the following UNESCO Biosphere Reserves

- Waterton Biosphere Reserve (since 1979)
- Beaver Hills Biosphere Reserve (since 2016)

== Federally protected areas ==
Five National Parks of Canada (Banff, Elk Island, Jasper, Waterton Lakes and Wood Buffalo), managed by Parks Canada are located in the province. Several former national parks (such Buffalo National Park, Wawaskesy National Park, and Nemiskam National Park) formerly existed in Alberta, but were delisted in 1947.

There are several National Historic Sites of Canada in Alberta, but only two are operated by Parks Canada: Rocky Mountain House, which features an indoor interpretation centre and year-round in-person interpretation, and Frog Lake which has only outdoor interpretive panels to mark the site.

Alberta is also home to Suffield National Wildlife Area, a protected area within the military reserve at CFB Suffield.

== Provincially protected areas ==
There are several different departments and agencies that deal with land use in Alberta, however Alberta's provincial parks are managed by Alberta Parks, which since 2022 is part of the Ministry of Forestry, Parks and Tourism whose mandate is to protect the province's natural landscapes in Alberta, as well as the Ministry of Environment and Protected Areas. Seven categories of protection exist. These categories are:

- Ecological reserves
- Wilderness areas
- Wildland provincial parks
- Provincial parks
- Natural areas
- Heritage rangelands
- Provincial recreation areas

As of 2026, the province of Alberta manages 78 provincial parks, 34 wildland provincial parks, 193 provincial recreation areas, 15 ecological reserves, 3 wilderness areas, 138 natural areas, 2 heritage rangelands and Willmore Wilderness Park as its own subtype. There is also a separate Section 7 land category for 10 locations that are currently declared but not yet designated (interim status).

Although these areas are the responsibility of the Alberta government, private companies have been contracted to handle various aspects of the operation of many parks (e.g. maintenance and campground operation).

=== List of wilderness areas ===
Wilderness areas have the strictest level of protection, no development of any kind is permitted, and travel is only permitted by foot.

- Ghost River Wilderness Area
- Siffleur Wilderness Area
- White Goat Wilderness Area
- Willmore Wilderness Park

=== List of wildland provincial parks ===
- Birch Mountains Wildland Provincial Park
- Birch River Wildland Provincial Park
- Bluerock Wildland Provincial Park
- Bob Creek Wildland Provincial Park
- Bow Valley Wildland Provincial Park
- Brazeau Canyon Wildland Provincial Park
- Caribou Mountains Wildland Provincial Park
- Castle Wildland Provincial Park
- Chinchaga Wildland Provincial Park
- Dillon River Wildland Provincial Park
- Don Getty Wildland Provincial Park
- Dunvegan West Wildland Provincial Park
- Elbow-Sheep Wildland Provincial Park
- Fidler-Greywillow Wildland Provincial Park
- Fort Assiniboine Sandhills Wildland Provincial Park
- Gipsy Lake Wildland Provincial Park
- Grand Rapids Wildland Provincial Park
- Grizzly Ridge Wildland Provincial Park
- Hay-Zama Lakes Wildland Provincial Park
- Hubert Lake Wildland Provincial Park
- Kakwa Wildland Provincial Park
- Kazan Wildland Provincial Park
- Kitaskino Nuwenëné Wildland Provincial Park
- La Biche River Wildland Provincial Park
- Lesser Slave Lake Wildland Provincial Park
- Marguerite River Wildland Provincial Park
- Otter-Orloff Lakes Wildland Provincial Park
- Peace River Wildland Provincial Park
- Richardson Wildland Provincial Park
- Rock Lake–Solomon Creek Wildland Provincial Park
- Stony Mountain Wildland Provincial Park
- Whitehorse Wildland Provincial Park
- Whitemud Falls Wildland Provincial Park
- Winagami Wildland Provincial Park

=== Other provincial lands ===
Approximately 60% of land in Alberta is public land owned by the Alberta government. For administrative purposes, the province is divided into two broad land use areas: the Green Area (forested land, almost entirely provincially owned) and the White Area (other). The Rocky Mountains Forest Reserve was created by the Forest Reserves Act of 1964. There are also 32 provincial grazing reserves located throughout Alberta. They are administered by Alberta Sustainable Resource Development. Kananaskis Country is not a park but a provincially run tract of land containing several parks.

=== List of heritage rangelands ===
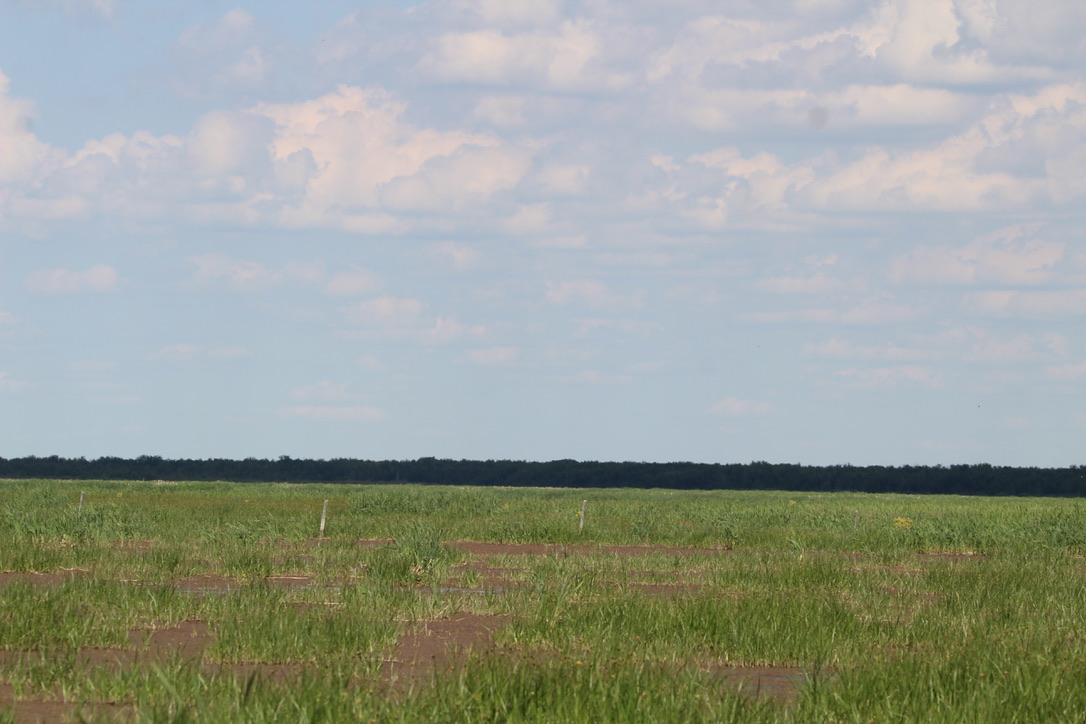
Beaverhill Lake Heritage Rangeland

- Beaverhill Lake Heritage Rangeland
- Black Creek Heritage Rangeland
- Killarney-Reflex Lakes Heritage Rangeland
- OH Ranch Heritage Rangeland
- Onefour Heritage Rangeland
- Ribstone Creek Heritage Rangeland
- Tolman Badlands Heritage Rangeland
- Twin River Heritage Rangeland

=== List of provincial recreation areas ===
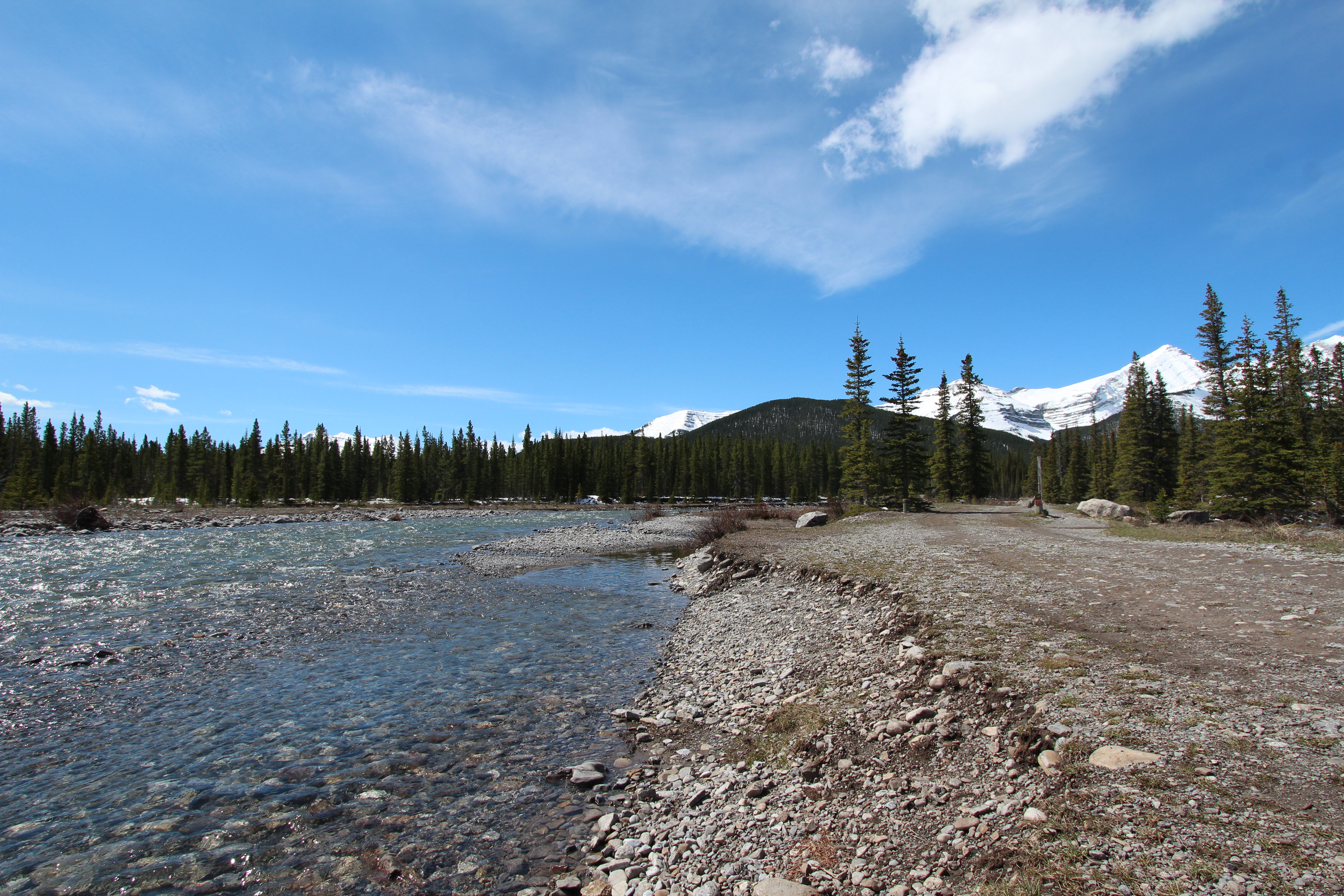
Little Elbow Provincial Recreation Area

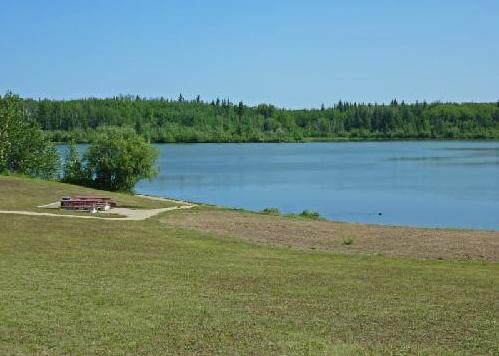
Figure Eight Lake Provincial Recreation Area

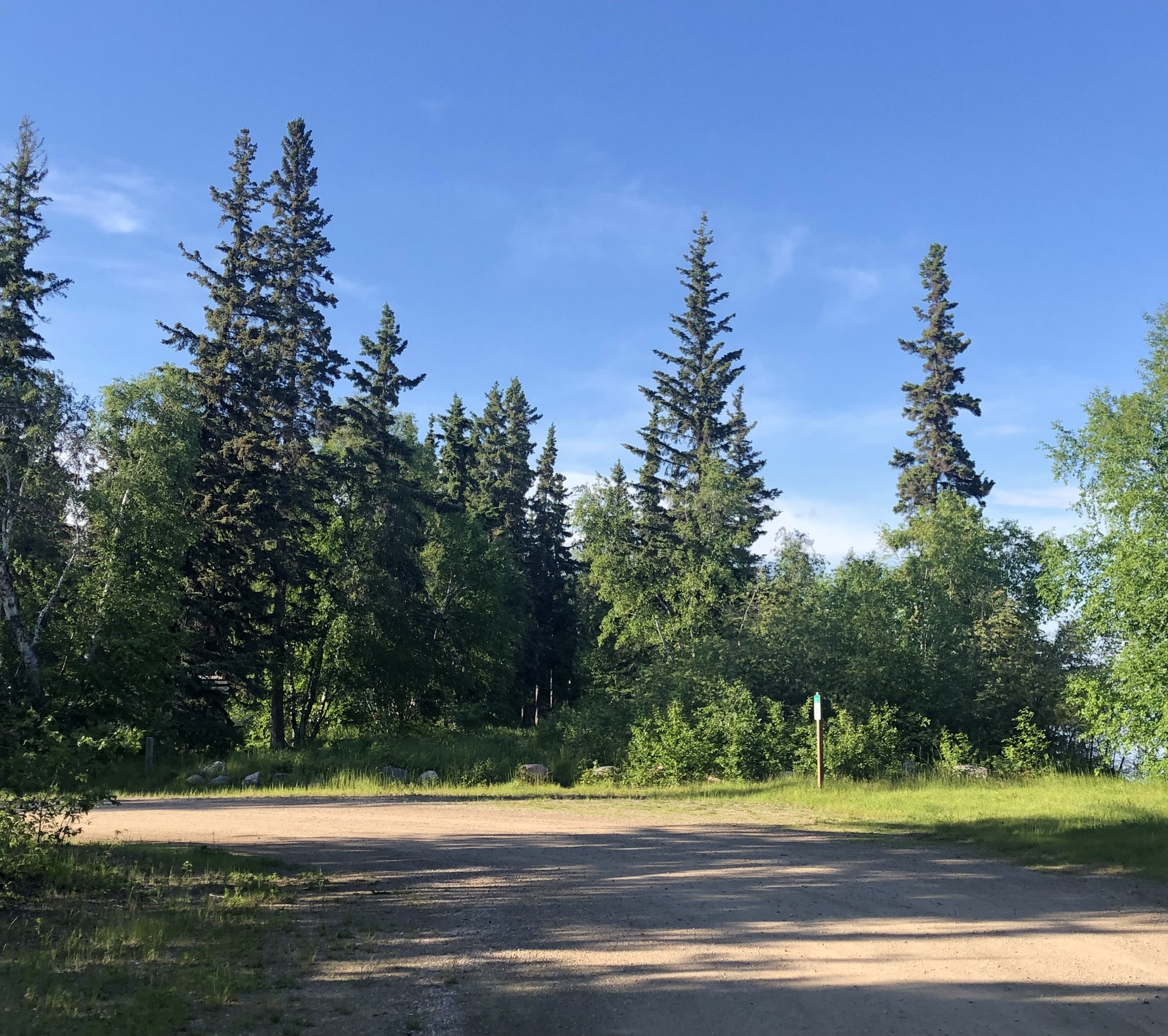
English Bay Provincial Recreation Area

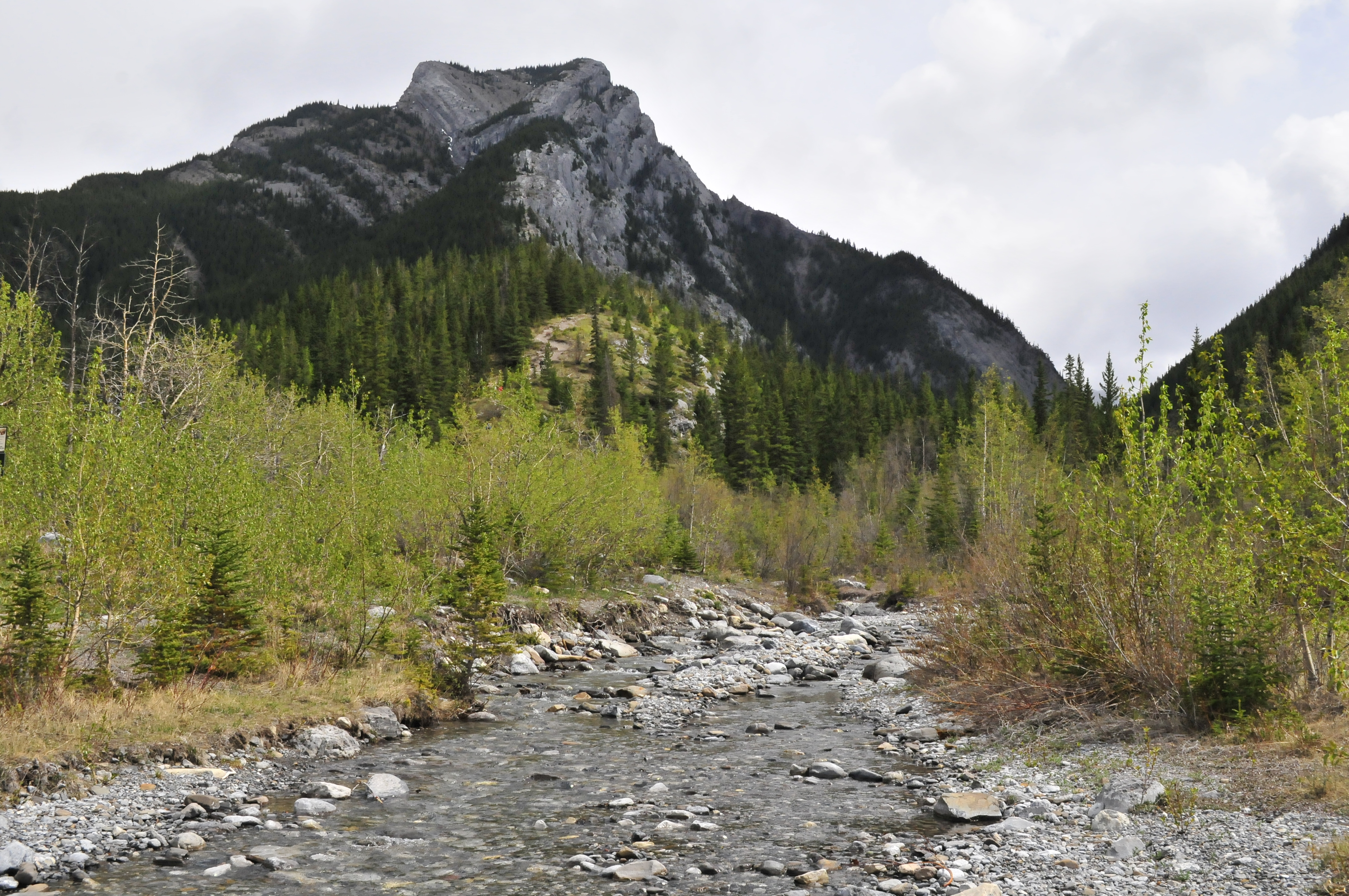
Heart Creek Provincial Recreation Area

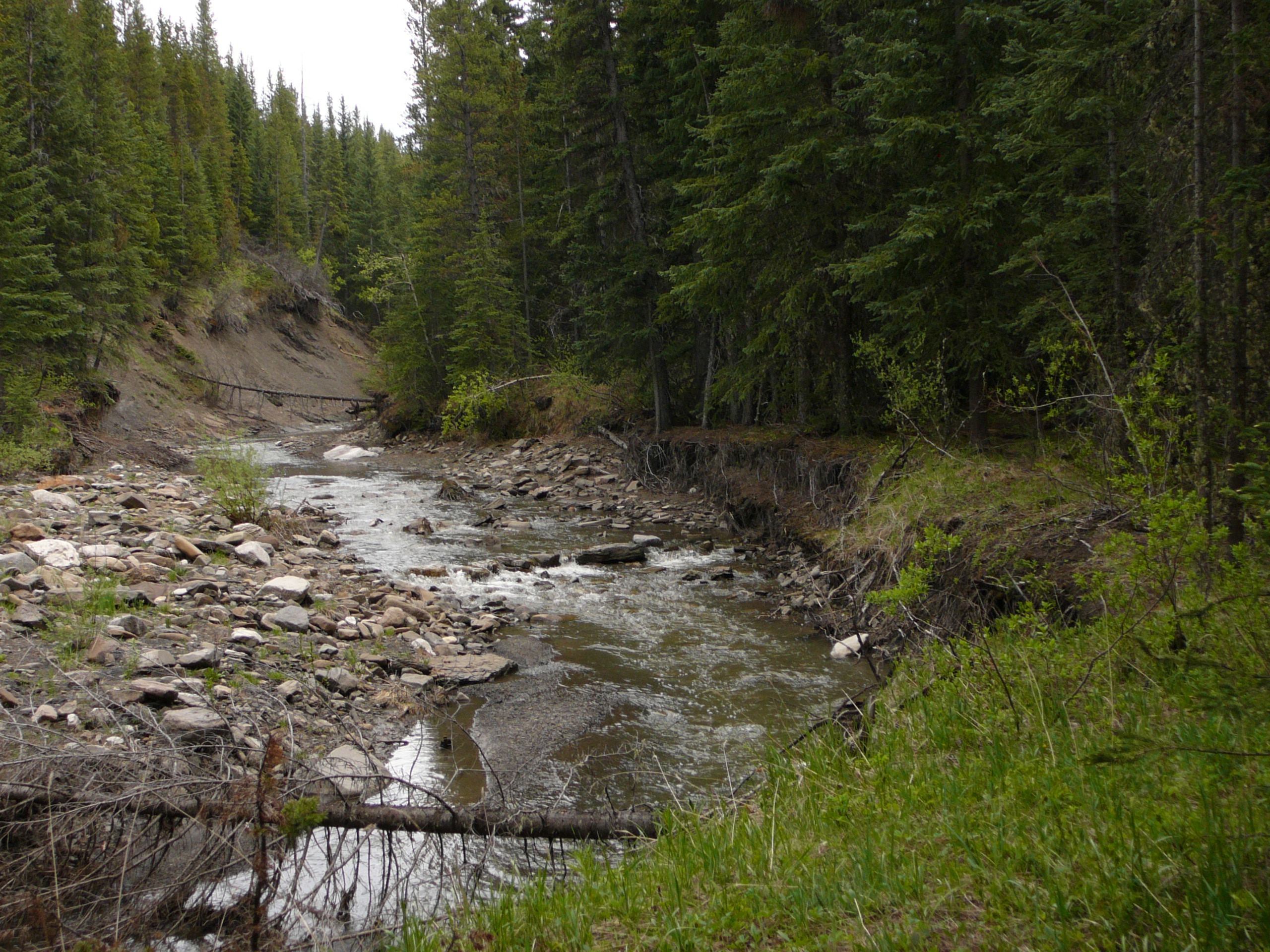
Etherington Creek Provincial Recreation Area

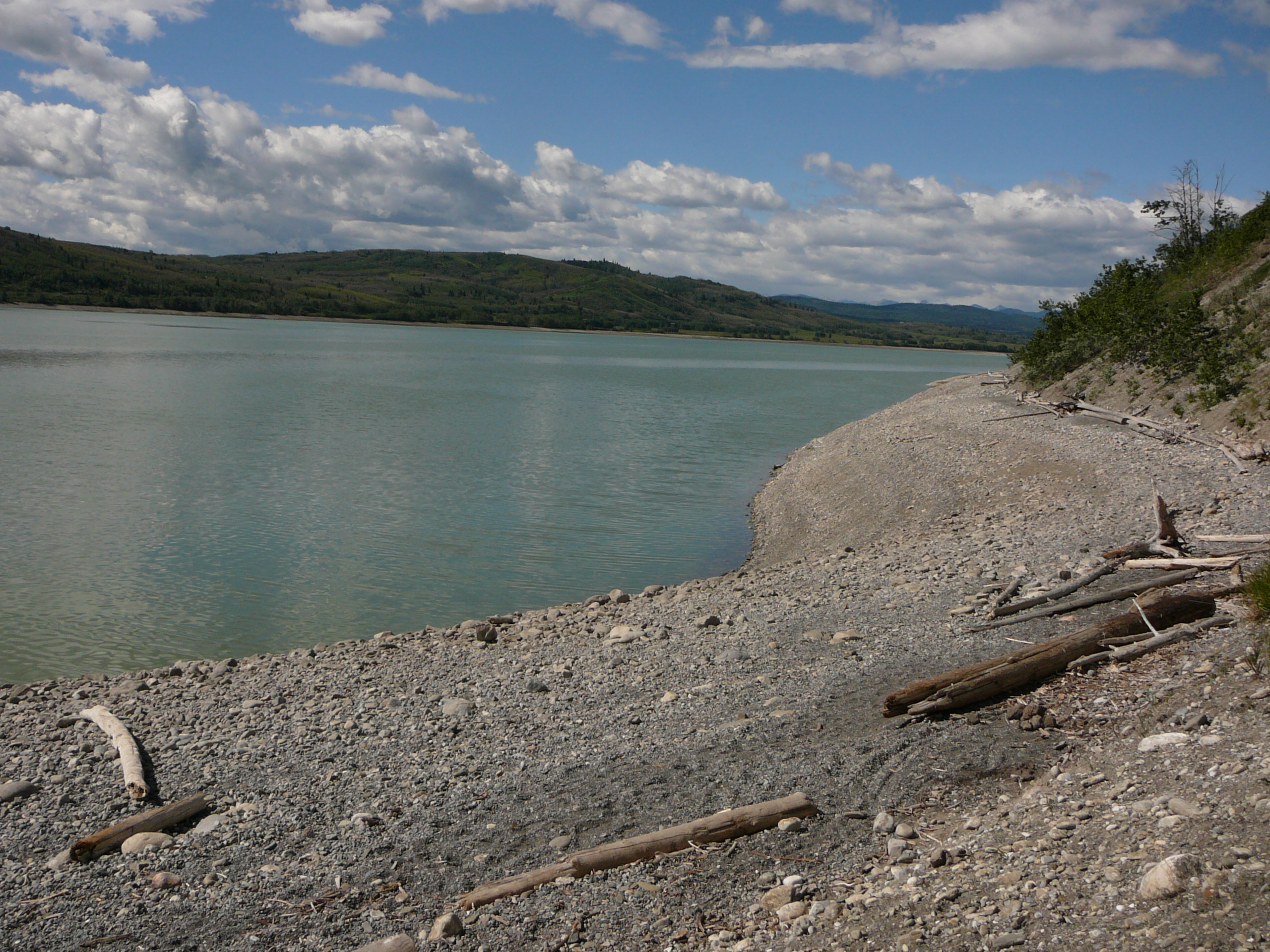
Ghost Reservoir Provincial Recreation Area

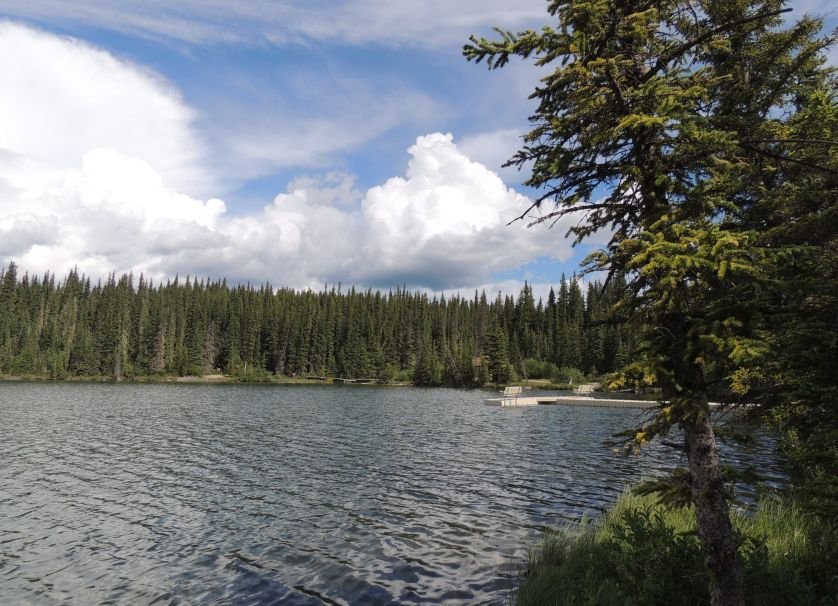
Fish Lake Provincial Recreation Area

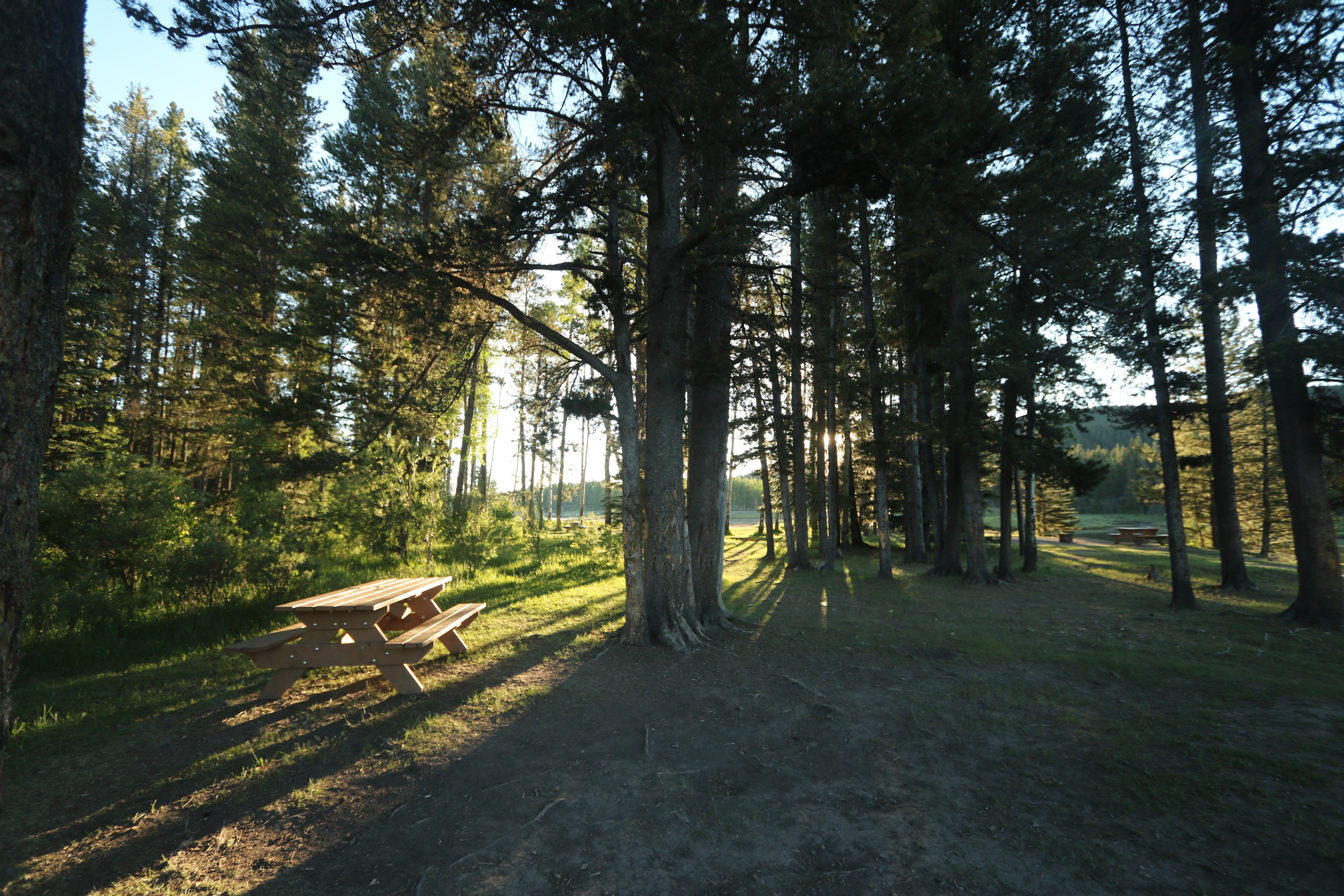
McLean Creek Provincial Recreation Area

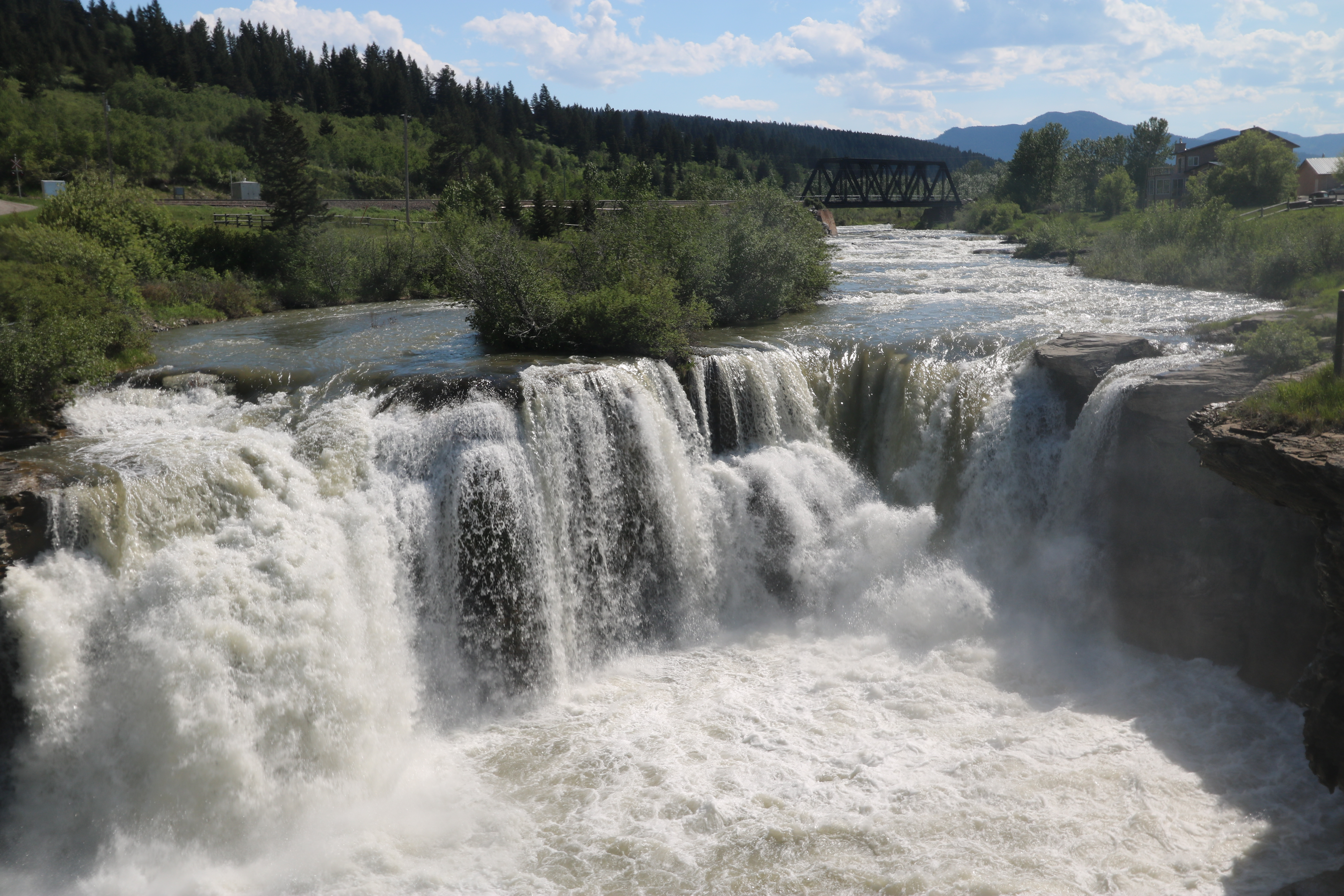
Lundbreck Falls Provincial Recreation Area

- Aylmer PRA
- Beaver Lake PRA
- Beaverdam PRA
- Big Berland PRA
- Big Mountain Creek PRA
- Bigelow Reservoir PRA
- Blackstone PRA
- Blue Rapids PRA
- Bow Valley PRA
- Brazeau Reservoir PRA
- Brazeau River PRA
- Brown Creek PRA
- Buck Lake PRA
- Buffalo Lake PRA
- Buffalo Tower PRA
- Bullshead Reservoir PRA
- Burnt Timber PRA
- Calhoun Bay PRA
- Cartier Creek PRA
- Cat Creek PRA
- Cataract Creek PRA
- Chain Lakes PRA
- Chambers Creek PRA
- Chambers Creek Group Camp PRA
- Chin Coulee PRA
- Chinook PRA
- Chrystina Lake PRA
- Coal Lake North PRA
- Cobble Flats PRA
- Cooking Lake-Blackfoot PRA
- Crescent Falls PRA
- Dawson PRA
- Deer Creek PRA
- Demmitt PRA
- Dutch Creek PRA
- Dry Haven PRA
- Edith Lake PRA
- Elbow Falls PRA
- Elbow River PRA
- Elbow River Launch PRA
- Elk Creek PRA
- Elk Creek Fish Pond PRA
- Elk River PRA
- English Bay PRA
- Engstrom Lake PRA
- Etherington Creek PRA
- Evan-Thomas PRA
- Fairfax Lake PRA
- Fallen Timber PRA
- Fallen Timber South PRA
- Fawcett Lake PRA
- Fickle Lake PRA
- Figure Eight Lake PRA
- Fish Lake PRA
- Fisher Creek PRA
- Fitzsimmons Creek PRA
- Franchere Bay PRA
- Freeman River PRA
- French Bay PRA
- Ghost Airstrip PRA
- Ghost Reservoir PRA
- Gleniffer Reservoir PRA
- Goldeye Lake PRA
- Gooseberry PRA
- Greenford PRA
- Hangingstone PRA
- Harlech PRA
- Heart Creek PRA
- Heart River Dam PRA
- Highwood PRA
- Highwood Compound PRA
- Highwood Junction PRA
- Honeymoon Creek PRA
- Horburg PRA
- Hornbeck Creek PRA
- Indian Graves PRA
- Ing's Mine PRA
- Iosegun Lake PRA
- Island Lake PRA
- Jackfish Lake PRA
- Jackson Lake Trail Staging PRA
- James-Wilson PRA
- Jensen Reservoir PRA
- Jumpingpound Creek PRA
- Kakwa River PRA
- Kehiwin PRA
- Lake McGregor PRA
- Lakeland PRA
- Lantern Creek PRA
- Lawrence Lake PRA
- Lineham PRA
- Little Bow Reservoir PRA
- Little Elbow PRA
- Little Sundance Creek PRA
- Livingstone Falls PRA
- Lovett River PRA
- Lundbreck Falls PRA
- Lusk Creek PRA
- Machesis Lake PRA
- Mallaig PRA
- Maqua Lake PRA
- Maycroft PRA
- McLean Creek PRA
- McLeod River PRA
- Medicine Lake PRA
- Mesa Butte PRA
- Michelle Reservoir PRA
- Minnow Lake PRA
- Mist Creek PRA
- Mitchell Lake PRA
- Moose Mountain Trailhead PRA
- Musreau Lake PRA
- Nojack PRA
- North Bruderheim PRA
- North Buck Lake PRA
- North Fork PRA
- Old Baldy Pass Trail PRA
- Oldman Dam PRA
- Oldman River PRA
- Oldman River North PRA
- Ole's Lake PRA
- Paddle River Dam PRA
- Payne Lake PRA
- Peaceful Valley PRA
- Pembina Forks PRA
- Peppers Lake PRA
- Peppers Lake Staging Area PRA
- Phyllis Lake PRA
- Picklejar PRA
- Pine Grove PRA
- Pines PRA
- Pinetop PRA
- Poachers' Landing PRA
- Prairie Creek PRA
- Prairie Creek Group Camp PRA
- Racehorse PRA
- Red Deer River PRA
- Redwater PRA
- Running Lake PRA
- St. Mary Reservoir PRA
- Saskatoon Mountain PRA
- Saunders PRA
- Sentinel PRA
- Seven Mile PRA
- Sheep Creek PRA
- Shunda Viewpoint PRA
- Shuttler Flats PRA
- Sibbald Lake PRA
- Sibbald Meadows Pond PRA
- Sibbald Viewpoint PRA
- Simonette River PRA
- Smoke Lake PRA
- Smoky River South PRA
- Snow Creek PRA
- South Ghost PRA
- Southview PRA
- Stoney Creek PRA
- Stoney Lake PRA
- Strachan PRA
- Strawberry PRA
- Sulphur Gates PRA
- Sulphur Lake PRA
- Swan Lake PRA
- Tay River PRA
- The Narrows PRA
- Thompson Creek PRA
- Trapper Lea's Cabin PRA
- Travers Reservoir PRA
- Trout Pond PRA
- Waiparous Creek PRA
- Waiparous Creek Group Camp PRA
- Waiparous Valley Viewpoint PRA
- Wapiabi PRA
- Ware Creek PRA
- Waskahigan River PRA
- Waterton Reservoir PRA
- Watson Creek PRA
- Weald PRA
- West Bragg Creek PRA
- Whitehorse Creek PRA
- Wildhay PRA
- Wild Horse PRA
- Wildhorse PRA
- Wildhorse Lake PRA
- Wilson Creek PRA
- Wolf Creek PRA
- Wolf Lake PRA
- Wolf Lake West PRA

=== List of natural areas ===
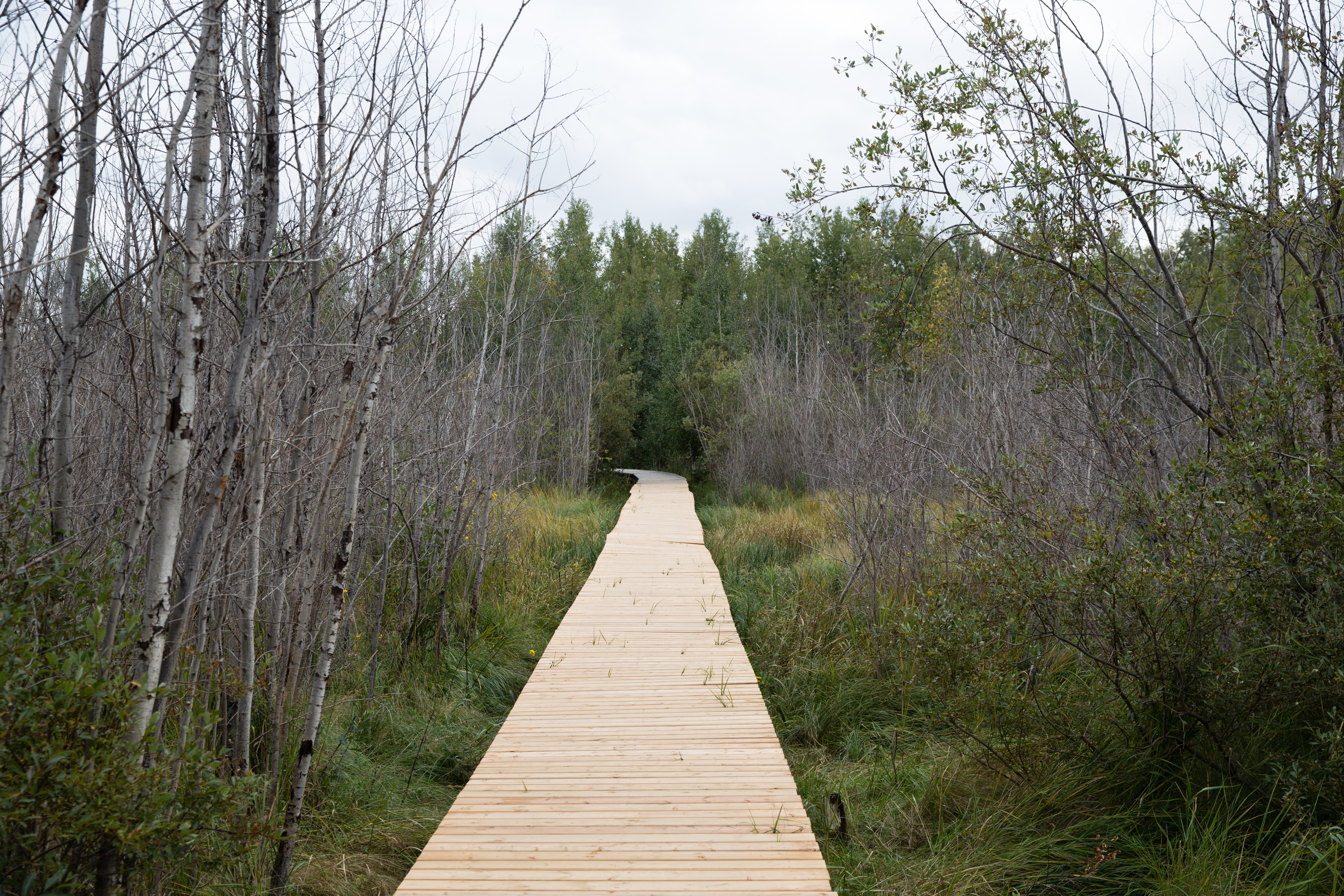
Clifford E. Lee Natural Area

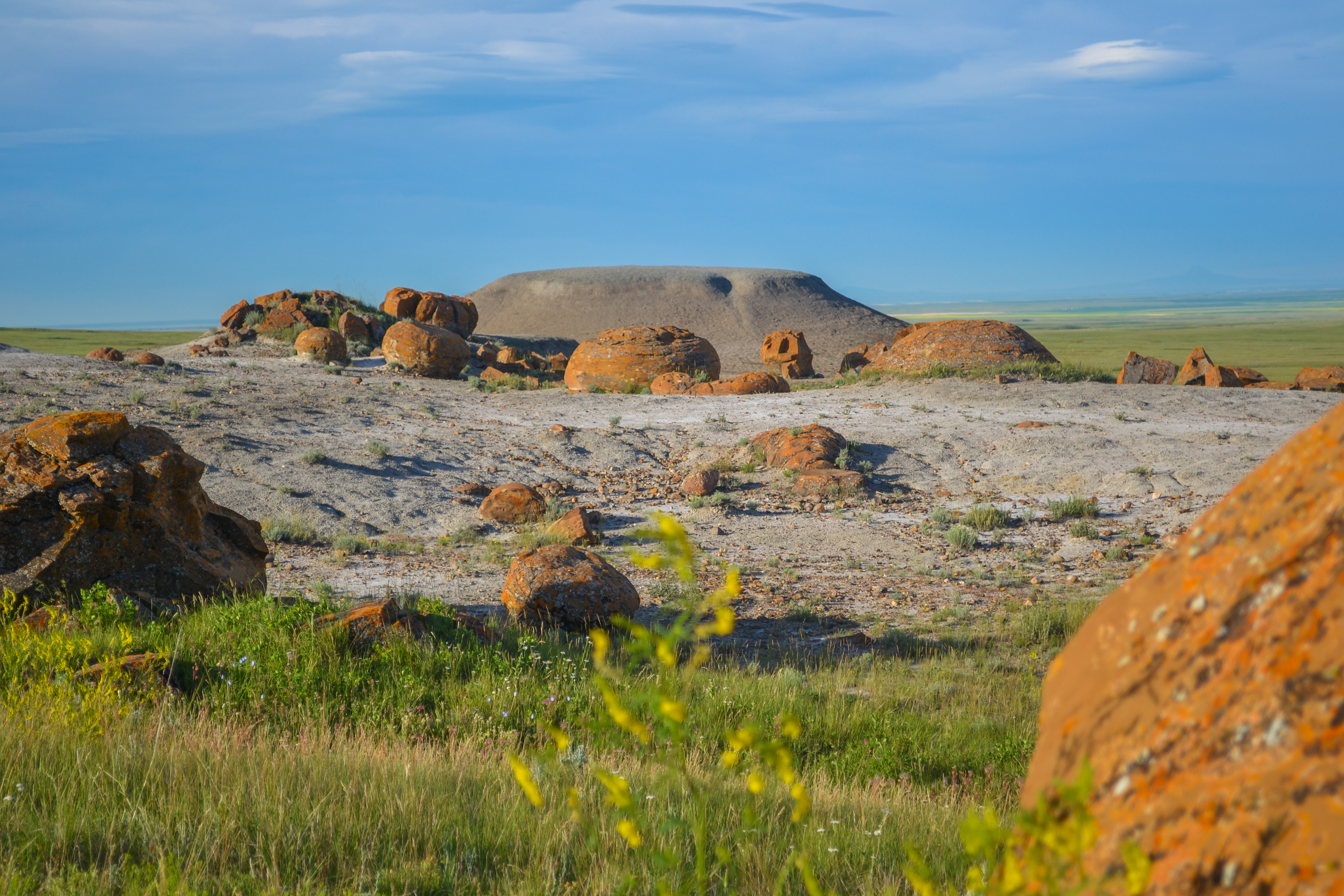
Red Rock Coulee Natural Area

- Alexo Natural Area
- Alsike Bat Lake Natural Area
- Anderson Creek Natural Area
- Antler Lake Island Natural Area
- Aurora Natural Area
- Battle Lake Natural Area
- Bear Lake Natural Area
- Bearberry Prairie Natural Area
- Beaverhill Lake Natural Area
- Beehive Natural Area
- Bellis Lake Natural Area
- Bellis North Natural Area
- Bentz Lake Natural Area
- Bigoray Natural Area
- Bilby Natural Area
- Bridge Lake Natural Area
- Buck Lake Natural Area
- Buck Lake Creek Natural Area
- Burtonsville Island Natural Area
- Butcher Creek Natural Area
- Caribou River Natural Area
- Carnwood Modeste Natural Area
- Centre of Alberta Natural Area
- Chedderville Natural Area
- Child Lake Meadows Natural Area
- Clear Lake Natural Area
- Clearwater Ricinus Natural Area
- Clifford E. Lee Natural Area
- Cow Lake Natural Area
- Coyote Lake Natural Area
- Crippsdale Natural Area
- Douglas Fir Natural Area
- Dussault Lake Natural Area
- Easyford Creek Natural Area
- Edgar T. Jones Natural Area
- Emerson Creek Natural Area
- Gadsby Lake Natural Area
- Garner Orchid Fen Natural Area
- Genesee Natural Area
- George Lake Natural Area
- Halfmoon Lake Natural Area
- Halfway Lake Natural Area
- Hargrave Coulees Natural Area
- Harper Creek Natural Area
- Hastings Lake Islands Natural Area
- Heatburg Natural Area
- Highway Natural Area
- Highwood River Natural Area
- Hoadley Natural Area
- Hondo Natural Area
- Horseshoe Creek Natural Area
- Innisfail Natural Area
- Isle Lake Natural Area
- J.J. Collett Natural Area
- Kakina Lake Natural Area
- Kleskun Hill Natural Area
- La Saline Natural Area
- Lac La Nonne Natural Area
- Lily Lake Natural Area
- Lloyd Creek Natural Area
- Magee Lake Natural Area
- Majeau Lake Natural Area
- Markerville Natural Area
- Matthews Crossing Natural Area
- Medicine Lodge Hills Natural Area
- Milk River Natural Area
- Mill Island Natural Area
- Modeste Creek Natural Area
- Modeste Saskatchewan Natural Area
- Mount Butte Natural Area
- Mt. Livingstone Natural Area
- Mystery Lake Natural Area
- Newton Lake Natural Area
- Noel Lake Natural Area
- North Cooking Lake Natural Area
- Northwest of Bruderheim Natural Area
- O'Chiese Natural Area
- Ole Buck Mountain Natural Area
- Opal Natural Area
- Open Creek Natural Area
- Otauwau Natural Area
- Outpost Wetlands Natural Area
- Paddle River Natural Area
- Park Court Natural Area
- Parkland Natural Area
- Pembina River Natural Area
- Pembina River Moon Lake Natural Area
- Pinto Creek Canyon Natural Area
- Police Point Natural Area
- Poplar Creek Natural Area
- Prefontaine Brock Lakes Natural Area
- Red Rock Coulee Natural Area
- Redwater River Natural Area
- Riverlot 56 Natural Area
- Rocky Rapids Natural Area
- Roselea Natural Area
- Ross Lake Natural Area
- Round Valley Natural Area
- Rumsey Natural Area
- St. Francis Natural Area
- Sand Lake Natural Area
- Saulteaux Natural Area
- Scalp Creek Natural Area
- Schrader Creek-Red Deer River Natural Area
- Sheep Creek Natural Area
- Sherwood Park Natural Area
- Snakes Head Natural Area
- Spruce Island Lake Natural Area
- Sturgeon Lake Natural Area
- Sundance Natural Area
- Sundre Natural Area
- Sundre North Natural Area
- Sundre Red Deer Natural Area
- Sylvan Lake Natural Area
- Tawatinaw Natural Area
- Taylor Lake Natural Area
- Thorsby Natural Area
- Threepoint Creek Natural Area
- Town Creek Natural Area
- Upper Mann Lake Natural Area
- Vega Natural Area
- Victoria Settlement Natural Area
- Wagner Natural Area
- Washout Creek Natural Area
- Welch Creek Natural Area
- White Earth Valley Natural Area
- Whitecourt Mountain Natural Area
- Wildcat Island Natural Area
- Wildhay Glacier Cascades Natural Area
- Yates Natural Area

=== List of ecological reserves ===
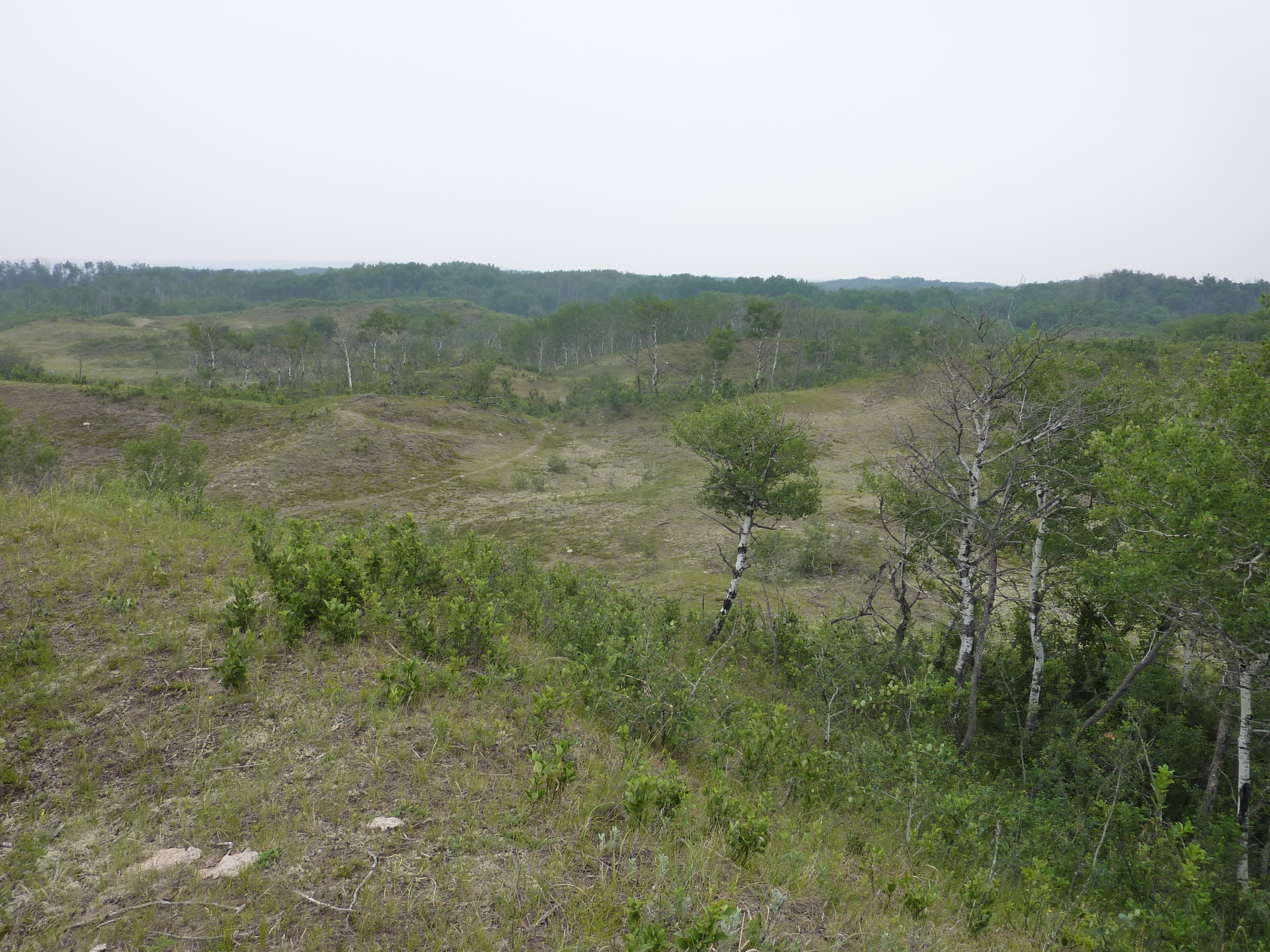
Wainwright Dunes Ecological Reserve

- Athabasca Dunes Ecological Reserve
- Goose Mountain Ecological Reserve
- Hand Hills Ecological Reserve
- Holmes Crossing Sandhills Ecological Reserve
- Marshybank Ecological Reserve
- Plateau Mountain Ecological Reserve
- Kennedy Coulee Ecological Reserve
- Kootenay Plains Ecological Reserve
- Rumsey Ecological Reserve
- Silver Valley Ecological Reserve
- Wainwright Dunes Ecological Reserve
- West Castle Wetlands Ecological Reserve

== See also ==
- List of Canadian protected areas
- List of National Parks of Canada
