= Gipsy Lake Wildland Provincial Park =

Protected area in Alberta, Canada

- IUCN category Ib (wilderness area)
- Location within Alberta Location within Canada
- Location: Wood Buffalo, Alberta, Canada
- Nearest city: Fort McMurray
- Coordinates: 56°29′43″N 110°23′16″W
- Area: 35,766.3 ha (88,380 acres)
- Established: 20 December 2000
- Governing body: Alberta Forestry, Parks and Tourism

Gipsy Lake Wildland Provincial Park is a wildland provincial park in Wood Buffalo, northern Alberta, Canada. The park was established on 20 December 2000 and has an area of 35,766.3 hectares (88,380 acres). In the Lower Athabasca Regional Plan, Gipsy Lake is planned to be significantly extended into the new Gipsy-Gordon Wildland Provincial Park with an area of 158,542 hectares (612.13 sq mi). Although the Lower Athabasca Regional Plan has been adopted, as of January 2023 the new Gipsy-Gordon park has not been created.

== Location ==
The park consists of three separated parcels of land surrounding Gipsy, Birch, Gordon and Shortt lakes. It is located 19 kilometres (12 mi) south of Fort McMurray on Highway 63, then 51 kilometres (32 mi) southeast on Highway 881. The park is remote; access during winter months only is east on Winter Road 956 for approximately 35 kilometres (22 mi). The remaining trail into the park is 20 kilometres (12 mi) via four-wheel drive or snowmobile. Summer access is via aircraft only.

== Ecology ==
The park is in the Central Mixedwood subregion of the Boreal Forest natural region of Alberta. The park preserves a lake and wetland complex. Birch Lake contains a diverse wetland habitat. Birch and Gipsy lakes contain nesting sites for the American white pelican. Gordon Lake is one of the most important waterfowl breeding, moulting, and staging areas in the region. Double-crested cormorants nest on an island in Birch Lake.

== Activities ==
The park has no developed facilities so only wildlife viewing and random backcountry camping are available. Off-highway vehicles and snowmobiles are permitted on existing trails during frozen conditions only. Aircraft access and landing in the park requires authorization. Hunting is allowed with proper permits. Fishing and boating on the lakes are permitted. The Gypsy [sic] Lake Lodge is a fly-in fishing lodge located within the park.

== See also ==
- List of Alberta provincial parks
- List of Canadian provincial parks
