= Susie Islands =

Archipelago in Lake Superior

- Location within Minnesota

Geography
- Location: Lake Superior
- Coordinates: 47°58′25.39″N 89°34′47.22″W
- Total islands: 13
- Major islands: Susie, Francis, and Lucille
- Highest elevation: 120 ft (37 m)

Administration
- United States
- State: Minnesota
- County: Cook County
- Townships: Grand Portage

Demographics
- Population: Uninhabited (2000)

The Susie Islands (The Susies) are a group of thirteen islands off the coast of the North Shore of Lake Superior in the Arrowhead Region of Minnesota. The outermost island is Lucille, and like Susie and Francis islands, it was named for a member of the Falconer family who once lived on Susie, mining its copper ore during the early 1900s. The Nature Conservancy and the Grand Portage Band of the Chippewa Tribe are working cooperatively to ensure that the area will remain intact and that the unique and unusual flora of the islands will survive.

Susie Island was previously owned by the Nature Conservancy and held as the Francis Lee Jaques Memorial Preserve and is the home to some of Minnesota's rarest plants, including alpine bistort and slender hairgrass, both species of special concern, mountain or rock cranberry and common bearberry. In 2017, the Nature Conservancy returned the island to the Grand Portage Band of the Chippewa Tribe.

Other diverse plant species include Norwegian whitlow grass (a state endangered species) and northern eyebright (a species of special concern), pearlwort, Arctic lupine, purple crowberry, and sphagnum moss. The interior of Susie Island is carpeted with a thick layer of moss. This is a fragile treasure that is easily destroyed by walking through the forest. The Susie Islands have a climate similar to the Arctic tundra due to the islands location; being on Lake Superior gives the islands harsher and colder weather than nearby Canada and Minnesota, and lower precipitation, both characteristics of tundra. The flora located on the islands is also similar to what is found in the tundra.

Its high point is more than 120 feet (37 m) above the lake.

== See also ==
- Isle Royale
- Pigeon Point
- Grand Portage
