= Gipsy-Gordon Wildland Park =

Protected area in northeastern Alberta, Canada

Gipsy-Gordon Wildland Provincial Park
- Gipsy-Gordon Wildland Park
- IUCN category Ib (wilderness area)
- Location within Alberta Location within Canada Location within Regional Municipality of Wood Buffalo
- Location: Regional Municipality of Wood Buffalo, Alberta, Canada
- Nearest city: Fort McMurray
- Coordinates: 56°29′07″N 110°19′26″W
- Area: 35,766.3 ha (138.094 sq mi)
- Established: 20 December 2000
- Governing body: Alberta Tourism, Parks and Recreation

Gipsy-Gordon Wildland Park is a wildland provincial park in northern Alberta, Canada. The park was establisher on 20 December 2000 and is 35,766.3 hectares (88,380 acres) in size. The Government of Alberta announced its creation through its approval of the Lower Athabasca Regional Plan Land Use Framework in November 2000.

== Location ==
The park is located in the northeast portion of the province within the Regional Municipality of Wood Buffalo. The park is 65 kilometres (40 mi) east-southeast of Fort McMurray. The park is south of the Clearwater River and north of Dillon River Wildland Provincial Park. It is west of the Saskatchewan border and east of the Christina River.

The park consists of three discontinuous parcels of land. The largest parcel surrounds Gordon Lake. The next largest surrounds Gipsy and Shortt Lakes. And the smallest parcel surrounds Birch Lake.

Summer access is fly-in only via floatplane. Winter access exists by traveling 19 kilometres (12 mi) south of Fort McMurray on Alberta Highway 63, then 51 kilometres (32 mi) southeast on Highway 881, and finally 35 kilometres (22 mi) east on a seasonal Winter Road 956. The remaining 20 kilometres (12 mi) travelled by four-wheel drive or snowmobile only.

== See also ==
- List of Alberta provincial parks
- List of Canadian provincial parks
- List of National Parks of Canada
