= Kitaskino Nuwenëné Wildland Provincial Park =

Protected area in northern Alberta, Canada

- IUCN category Ib (wilderness area)
- Location within Alberta Location within Canada Location within Regional Municipality of Wood Buffalo
- Location: Wood Buffalo, Alberta, Canada
- Nearest city: Fort McKay
- Coordinates: 57°54′00″N 112°00′00″W
- Area: 314,510 ha (1,214.3 sq mi)
- Established: 8 March 2019
- Governing body: Alberta Parks

Kitaskino Nuwenëné Wildland Provincial Park is a wildland provincial park in Wood Buffalo, northern Alberta, Canada. Kitaskino, means “our land” in Cree and Nuwenëné means “our land” in Dene; the two languages are spoken by the First Nation communities in the area. The park as created on 8 March 2019 had an area of 161,880 hectares (1,619 km^{2}; 625 mi^{2}). It was expanded on 26 January 2022 to 314,510 hectares (3,145 km^{2}; 1,214 mi^{2}). The park is a successful collaboration between the Mikisew Cree First Nation, the governments of Alberta and Canada, and petroleum industry partners in the area. Teck Resources, Imperial Oil, and Cenovus Energy returned oil leases to the Athabasca oil sands which underlay the area. This enabled the land to be turned into a park. After the initial creation of the park in 2019, the Milisew First Nation worked with Burgess Canadian Resources to relinquished their oilsands leases which led to the addition of 152,000 hectares (1,520 km^{2}; 587 mi^{2}) to the park.

== Location ==
The park consists of three parcels of land. The largest and westernmost parcel is immediately south of Wood Buffalo National Park and shares its western border with Birch River Wildland Provincial Park. The eastern border covers the Athabasca River for the northernmost township 104 (6 miles (9.7 km)) and then west of Chipewyan Indian Reserve 201G. The southern border is the southern extent of township 101.

The remaining two parcels are connected and lie east of the Athabasca River and north of the Marguerite River. The parcels border the Richardson Wildland Provincial Park to the north and east. The two parcels consume most of townships 101 and 102 for ranges 6, 7, and 8 west of the fourth meridian.

== Ecology ==
The park is part of the boreal forest of Canada. Summers are short, with only one or two months in which the average daily temperature exceeds 15 °C (59 °F). Winters are long and very cold, with average daily temperatures below −10 °C (14 °F) for four months or more and below −20 °C (−4 °F) for two months or more. The landscape is deciduous, mixedwood, and coniferous forests interspersed with extensive wetlands. The park includes the Central Mixedwood, Lower Boreal Highlands, Upper Boreal Highlands, Athabasca Plain subregions. The park is part of a larger effort to protect the boreal forest ecosystem. Kitaskino Nuwenëné joins Kazan, Richardson, Dillon River, Birch River, and Birch Mountains Wildland Provincial Parks along with Wood Buffalo Nation Park to form the world's largest protected area for boreal forest. Before the addition of Kitaskino Nuwenëné WPP, the parks protect 67,735 square kilometres (26,153 mi^{2}), almost twice the size of Vancouver Island.

Being connected to the other protected areas, the park protects the range of migratory animals: the Red Earth caribou herd and the Ronald Lake bison herd. In addition, the park creates a conservation buffer zone to increase watershed protection to support the Wood Buffalo National Park UNESCO World Heritage Site biological diversity of the Peace-Athabasca Delta.

== Activities ==
The park supports First Nations’ traditional activities, including the exercise of treaty rights.

The park is very remote, and access is only via aircraft. Authorization is required to land in the park; only helicopters or floatplanes have that ability. The park has no developed facilities so only backcountry camping and hiking are available. Hunting and fishing are allowed with proper permits. Snowmobiling is permitted in the park on existing trails.

== See also ==
- List of Alberta provincial parks
- List of Canadian provincial parks
