= Kazan Wildland Provincial Park =

Protected area in northern Alberta, Canada

- IUCN category Ib (wilderness area)
- Location within Alberta Location within Canada Location within Regional Municipality of Wood Buffalo
- Location: Regional Municipality of Wood Buffalo, Alberta, Canada
- Nearest town: Fort Chipewyan, Alberta
- Coordinates: 59°30′N 110°45′W
- Area: 659,397 ha (2,545.95 sq mi)
- Established: 14 May 2018
- Governing body: Alberta Tourism, Parks and Recreation

Kazan Wildland Provincial Park is a wildland provincial park in northern Alberta, Canada. It was established on 14 May 2018 and is a large park with an area of 659,397 hectares (2,546 mi^{2}). This park contains large lakes, sand deposits, wetlands and bedrock outcrops. It is reported to contain rare plants within its unique south facing grasslands.

As of January 2023, Kazan is the largest park under Alberta provincial authority (Banff, Jasper, and Wood Buffalo National Parks are larger but are under federal authority). The park was initiated by and is contained in the Lower Athabasca Regional Plan Land Use Framework in August 2012. Two smaller parks, La Butte Creek and Colin-Cornwall Lakes Wildland Provincial Parks, were disestablished and incorporated into Kazan.

== Location ==
The park is located in the far northeast corner of the province within the Regional Municipality of Wood Buffalo; to the north is Northwest Territories and east is Saskatchewan. It encompasses the majority of lands north of Lake Athabasca and east of Wood Buffalo National Park with Slave River and Rivière des Rochers forming the western boundary.

Kazan is one of the most remote Wildland Parks in the province and it is only accessible by aircraft. Aircraft landing in the park requires authorization from Alberta Parks. Only helicopters and floatplanes are able to land in the park.

== Ecology ==
The park is in the Kazan Uplands subregion of the Canadian Shield Natural Region in the Alberta classification system. In the National Ecological Framework for Canada used by Environment and Climate Change Canada, the park is in the Uranium City Upland ecodistrict of the Tazin Lake Upland ecoregion in the Western Taiga Shield ecoprovince of the Taiga Shield ecozone. Under the OneEarth classification (previously World Wildlife Fund), the park is in the Muskwa-Slave Lake Taiga ecoregion of the Northwest Canadian Taiga, Lakes, and Wetlands bioregion.

=== Geography ===
The topology of Kazan is rolling to hummocky with local variation up to 50 m (160 ft). On average, 60 percent of the landscape is exposed bedrock. Between the bedrock outcrops, the soil is mainly coarse and acidic. The park has many small lakes which comprise approximately 10 percent of the surface; the largest being Andrew, Charles, Colin, Cornwall and Wylie Lakes. In addition, a few small streams drain into the Slave River. Wetlands are found more in the western part of the park and cover about 20 percent of the total area. Elevations range from 200 to 400 metres (660 to 1,310 ft) with the northern portions being slightly higher than the west near the Slave River. Cornwall Lake contains sand dunes and sand plains along the shore. Colin Lake contains rocky islands. North of Colin Lake are unique kettle wetlands.

=== Climate ===

The Köppen climate classification of the park is Continental, Subarctic (Dfc) characterized by long, cold, dry winters, and short, cool, summers. The climate is influenced by continental polar and continental arctic weather systems. Using the data from nearby weather station, Cambrian Auto, for 1991 to 2020, the average daily temperatures exceeds 10 °C (50 °F) only for June, July and August while average daily temperatures are less than 0 °C (32 °F) for November through April. At Cambrian Auto station, the long-run average precipitation from 1991 to 2020 is less than 20 mm (0.79 in) per month in the winter months of November through April. Precipitation then peaks in July at 67 mm (2.6 in) per month.

=== Vegetation ===
Vegetation in the park is strongly influenced by the distribution of the bedrock and the acidic features of the well drained rocky soils. In addition, the park is hit with frequent forest fires. Lichen communities occur on the surface of the outcrops. In well drained to dry areas, Alaska birch, aspen and jack pine exist in open stands. The understory is sparse and consists of bearberry, bog cranberry, ground juniper, and a variety of drought-tolerant ferns. In bands adjacent to wetlands and along lakes, Alaska birch, aspen, balsam poplar, and white spruce are found. In addition, a diverse shrub and forb understory developed.

In the wetlands with organic soils, forests are formed by black spruce with an understory of common bog cranberry, cloudberry, Labrador tea, leatherleaf, and peat moss. Wetlands with nutrient-rich soils typically have open forests of dwarf birch, tamarack, willow plus sedges and rich mosses. Marshes exist in sheltered bays on lakes or along creek channels. They are dominated by water sedge and small bottle sedge, bulrushes, and pondweeds. Provincially rare plants including knotted pearlwort, lens-fruited sedge, and sunpine sedge grow on sand and gravel plains and wetlands.

=== Wildlife ===
Fish species in the park include arctic grayling, lake trout, lake whitefish, northern pike, and walleye.

The varied topologies create a variety of habitats for birds. Sandhill cranes, waterfowl, migratory and breeding shorebirds are found along the sandy and muddy shores of the lakes. The rocky cliffs of the outcrops provide nesting sites for Peregrine falcons. Common species found along rocky shores are birds such as Bonaparte's, Herring, and California gull and the common tern. Bald eagles and osprey nest beside the lakes. Wetlands support the common loon, alder flycatcher, Bonaparte's gull, bufflehead, lesser scaup, Lincoln's sparrow, palm warbler, red-winged blackbird, rusty blackbird, and spotted sandpiper. Jack pine forests provide habitat for American robin, boreal chickadee, common nighthawk, common raven, dark-eyed junco, gray jay, and hermit thrush. Large birds species also include golden eagle and gyrfalcon. Provincially rare species found in the park are mew gull and semipalmated plover.

Mammal species include North American beaver, arctic shrew, Canada lynx, least chipmunk, mink, moose, muskrat, North American river otter, water shrew, and gray wolf. The jack pine forests are home to red fox, red squirrel, and snowshoe hare. Species visiting the park in winter from the Northwest Territories include the Arctic fox, and the barren-ground caribou.

== Activities ==
The park has several hiking trails that wind through different ecosystems. There are no established campsites, but random backcountry camping is permitted. The park also offers birdwatching and wildlife viewing. Power boating, canoeing, and kayaking are allowed in the park however the lack of road access restricts vessels to only those which can be transported by light aircraft. In the winter, the park allows the use of snowmobiles. Hunting and fishing are allowed in the park with proper licensing and permits.

== See also ==
- List of provincial parks in Alberta
- List of Canadian provincial parks
- List of National Parks of Canada
