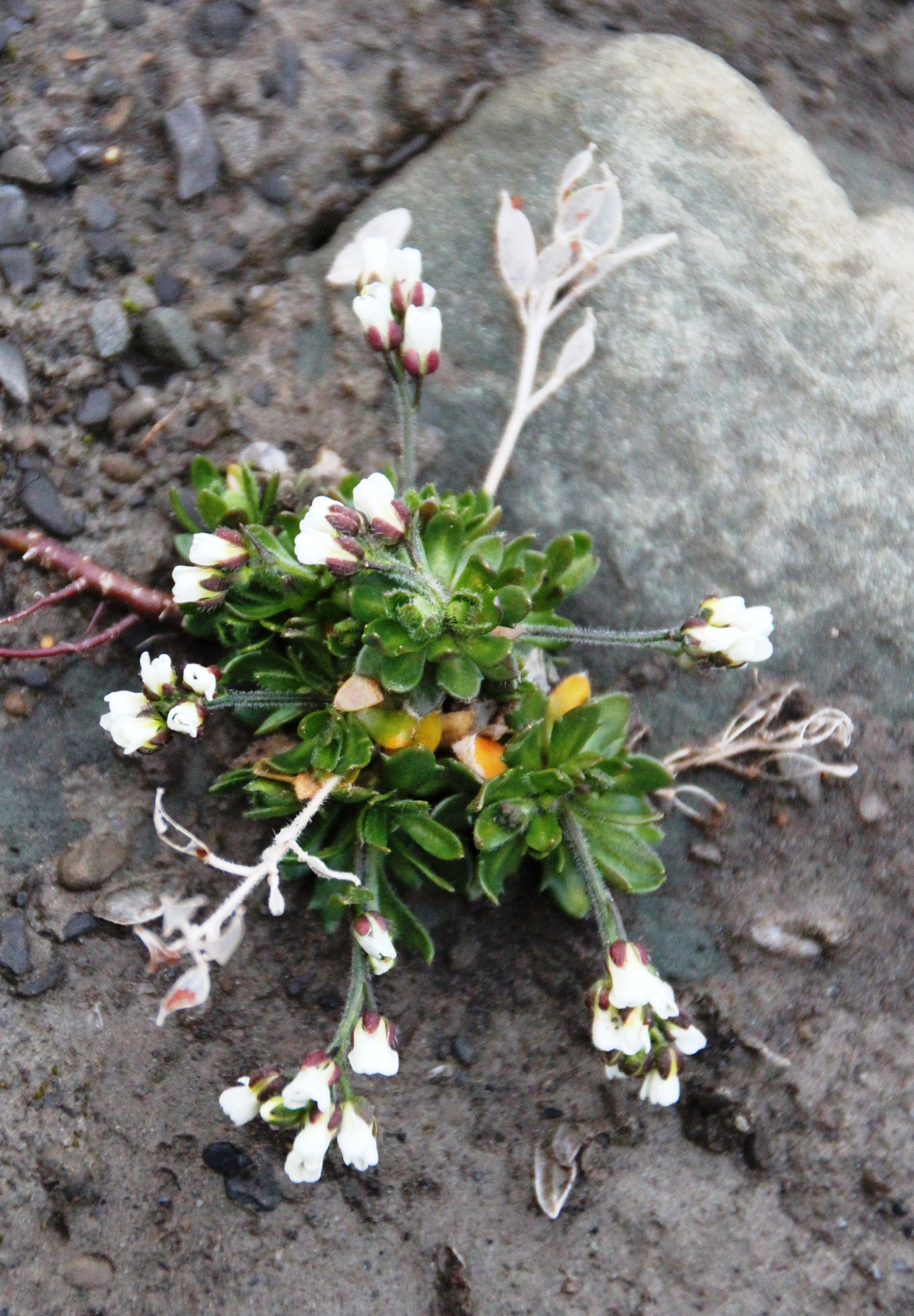

Scientific classification
- Kingdom: Plantae
- Clade: Tracheophytes
- Clade: Angiosperms
- Clade: Eudicots
- Clade: Rosids
- Order: Brassicales
- Family: Brassicaceae
- Genus: Draba
- Species: D. norvegica

Binomial name
- Draba norvegica Gunnerus

Synonyms
- List: Draba clivicola Fernald; Draba furcata E.Ekman; Draba hirta Gunnerus; Draba hirta f. rupestris (R.Br.) Ostenf.; Draba hirta var. norvegica (Gunnerus) Lilj.; Draba inferalpina E.Ekman; Draba laxa Lindblom; Draba norvegica var. berlinii O.E.Schulz; Draba norvegica var. clivicola (Fernald) B.Boivin; Draba norvegica var. glabrata (Lindblom) O.E.Schulz; Draba norvegica var. hebecarpa (Lindblom) O.E.Schulz; Draba norvegica var. intermedia (Lindblom) O.E.Schulz; Draba norvegica var. laxa (Lindblom) O.E.Schulz; Draba norvegica var. norvegica; Draba norvegica var. pleiophylla Fernald; Draba norvegica var. sornborgeri (Fernald) B.Boivin; Draba proxima E.Ekman; Draba rupestris R.Br.; Draba rupestris f. glabriuscula Pohle; Draba rupestris f. stellatopilosa Pohle; Draba scandinavica Lindblom; Draba scandinavica var. hebecarpa Lindblom; Draba sornborgeri Fernald; Draba trichella Fr.

= Draba norvegica =

Species of flowering plant

Draba norvegica is a species of flowering plant in the mustard family (Brassicaceae) know by the common names Norwegian draba and Norwegian whitlow grass.

== Description ==
Draba norvegica is a small cespitose (forming dense clumps or tufts), herbaceous perennial plant with a rosette of leaves from which a simple unbranched or branched, (0.2-)0.4-1.4(-2) dm tall, flowering stem arises. The basal leaves are simple, with hispid hairs, and narrowly oblanceolate in shape. The stem leaves are also covered in hispid hairs. The flowers are arranged into a raceme inflorescence with 5-23-flowers. The flowers have 2 to 4 rays and are white in color. The fruits (siliques) in contrast to the foliage are hairless or nearly so.

== Distribution and habitat ==
Draba norvegica occurs along the Atlantic coast of eastern North America and northwestern Europe with disjunct inland populations. In Canada it is found in arctic and subarctic areas growing on gravelly shorelines, ledges, cliffs, and stone barrens. There is one small population in the USA state of Minnesota found growing on the rocky shores of Susie island in lake superior which has an arctic-like environment. In Minnesota it is listed as an endangered species, with around 50 plants counted in 1998.
