= Gordon Lake (Ontario) =

Gordon Lake is the name of several lakes in Ontario, Canada. The largest of these is located near Rock Lake, Ontario in Parry Sound District

== List of Gordon Lakes in Ontario ==
- Near Route 60 in Haliburton County, Ontario 45°31′34″N 78°22′48″W
- Southeast of Kincardine, Ontario, in Bruce County, Ontario 44°08′11″N 81°26′54″W
- Near Rock Lake in Parry Sound District 46°25′14″N 83°50′03″W
- Near Ontario Route 520 Parry Sound District, Ontario 45°41′55″N 79°54′50″W
- In Algoma District 45°40′03″N 80°20′38″W
- In Algoma District 46°37′05″N 84°11′54″W
- Sudbury 46°29′26″N 81°21′10″W
- Timiskaming 47°38′55″N 81°00′06″W
- Sudbury 46°29′45″N 81°58′46″W
- Kenora 49°53′30″N 92°42′37″W
- Thunder Bay 50°28′10″N 94°55′43″W
- Chochrane 48°18′48″N 80°41′04″W

== See also ==
- List of lakes in Ontario
