= Mew gull =

Mew gull has been split into the following two species:

- Common gull, Larus canus
- Short-billed gull, Larus brachyrhynchus

The name can also refer to:

- Percival Mew Gull, 1930s British racing aircraft
