= Birch Mountains Wildland Provincial Park =

Protected area in northern Alberta, Canada

- IUCN category Ib (wilderness area)
- Location within Alberta Location within Canada Location within Regional Municipality of Wood Buffalo
- Location: Wood Buffalo, Alberta, Canada
- Nearest city: Fort McKay, Alberta
- Coordinates: 57°30′30″N 113°0′0″W
- Area: 145,969 ha (563.59 sq mi)
- Established: 20 December 2000
- Governing body: Alberta Parks

Birch Mountains Wildland Provincial Park is a wildland provincial park in northern Alberta, Canada. The park was established on 20 December 2000 with an area of 144,505 hectares (357,080 acres; 557.94 sq mi). On 14 May 2018, the park was enlarged slightly to an area of 145,969 hectares (360,697.25 acres; 563.59 sq mi). The park was created as part of Alberta's "Special Places" initiative. The park is contained in the Lower Athabasca Region Land Use Framework finalized in 2012. It contains a free roaming wood bison herd. The park is named for the Birch Mountains that are partially contained within the boundaries of the park.

== Location ==
The park is located in the Regional Municipality of Wood Buffalo in northeastern Alberta. The park is south of Wood Buffalo National Park, Birch River Wildland Provincial Park, and Kitaskino Nuwenëné Wildland Provincial Park. It borders Alberta Crown land to the north and south and most of the west. It abuts Birch River Wildland Provincial Park in the southwest corner. To the east, the park is adjacent to two Indian reserves, Namur River 174A and Namur Lake 174B, both belonging to the Fort McKay First Nation. The park is very remote; there are no roads to the park. In summer, the only access is the Namur Lake airstrip or via floatplane landing on the lakes in the park. In winter, access is by road, 115 kilometres (71 mi) north of Fort McMurray on Alberta Highway 63 and then private industry roads. Final access is via snowmobile, for approximately 20 kilometres (12 mi), on designated trails only.

== Ecology ==
The park protects a segment of the Lower and Upper Boreal Highlands subregions of the Boreal Forest region in the Natural Regions Framework for Alberta. In the National Ecological Framework for Canada used by Environment and Climate Change Canada, the park is in the Birch Upland ecodistrict of the Mid-Boreal Uplands ecoregion of the Central Boreal Plains ecoprovince of the Boreal Plains ecozone. Under the OneEarth classification (previously World Wildlife Fund), the park is in the Mid-Canada Boreal Plains Forests ecoregion of the Mid-Canada Boreal Plains & Foothill Forests bioregion.

=== Geography ===
The shape of the park is a rough parallelogram slanting in a northeast-southwest configuration. The east-west base is 62 kilometres (39 mi) wide while the northeast-southwest side is 46 kilometres (29 mi). The park is characterized with relatively flat highlands with an average elevation of 800 metres (2,600 ft) in comparison to the surrounding lowlands of the Athabasca River valley. The terrain is hills with lakes and wetlands in the valleys between. Larger lakes; Namur Lake, Legend Lake, two Gardner Lakes, Big Island Lake, and Sand Lake are found in the east of the park. Many smaller, unnamed lakes are seen throughout the park. The peak elevation in the park is 856 metres (2,808 ft) and the lowest point is 636 metres (2,087 ft) on the north in the Birch River valley.

=== Climate ===

The Köppen climate classification of the park is Continental, Subarctic (Dfc) characterized by long, cold winters, and short, warm to cool summers. Using the data from a weather station within the park, Legend Auto at the Legend fire lookout tower, for 1991 to 2020, the average daily temperatures exceeds 10 °C (50 °F) only for June, July, and August while average daily temperatures are less than 0 °C (32 °F) for November through March. At Legend Auto, the long-run average precipitation from 1991 to 2020 for the wettest months, June and July, is 80 to 100 mm (3.1 to 3.9 in) per month; conversely, the station receive less than 30 mm (1.2 in) per month from October through April.

=== Natural history ===
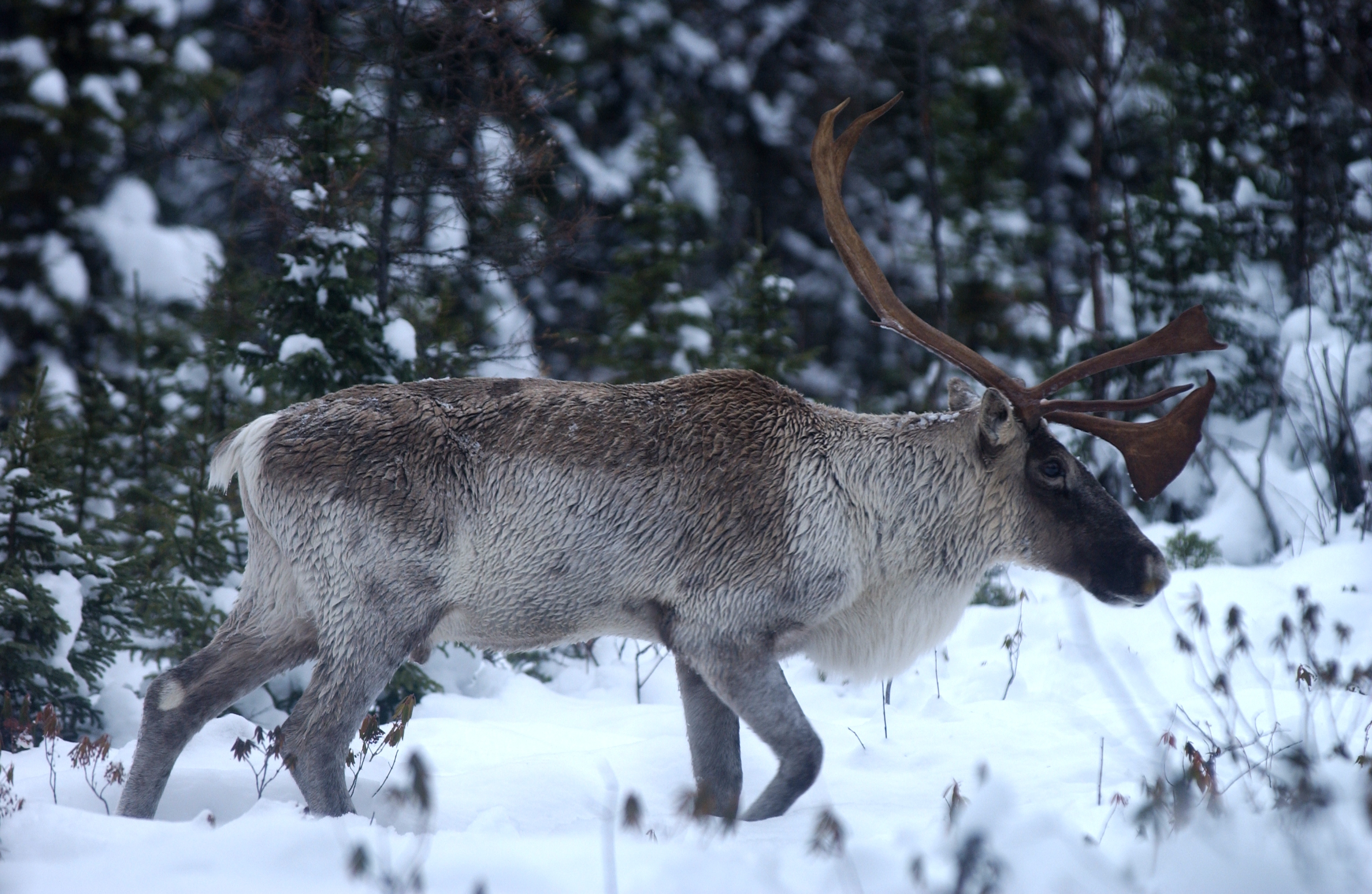
Boreal Caribou

The elevation and topography of the park influences the hydrology and vegetation cover. In addition to old growth forests, multiple treed, shrubby and open bogs are essential habitat for many wildlife species. Black spruce communities are the predominantly cover in the park, with peatlands covering up toa%quarter of the landscape. The area has a remarkably diverse ecosystem that supports lake trout, lake whitefish, cisco, Arctic grayling, walleye, and yellow perch; and many more. Osprey and bald eagles nest in the larger trees around the lakes. The rare, spore-bearing plant quillwort (Isoetes echinospora) was discovered in the area in 2004.

The park is within the range of the Boreal Red Earth Caribou herd.

== Activities ==
There are no developed camping facilities in the park but random backcountry camping is allowed. Other activities in the park include hiking and wildlife viewing. Off-highway vehicle riding is permitted on existing trails only.. Hunting, fishing, and ice fishing are allowed with permits. There are two commercial backcountry lodges in the park: Namur Lake Lodge and Island Lake Lodge.

== See also ==
- List of provincial parks in Alberta
- List of Canadian provincial parks
- List of National Parks of Canada
