= Birch River Wildland Provincial Park =

Protected area in northern Alberta, Canada

- IUCN category Ib (wilderness area)
- Location within Alberta Location within Canada Location within Regional Municipality of Wood Buffalo
- Location: Wood Buffalo, Alberta, Canada
- Nearest city: Fort McKay
- Coordinates: 57°49′00″N 113°28′00″W
- Area: 331,832 ha (1,281.21 sq mi)
- Established: 14 May 2018
- Governing body: Alberta Parks

Birch River Wildland Provincial Park is a wildland provincial park in northern Alberta, Canada. It was established on 14 May 2018 and covers 331,832 hectares (1,281.2 sq mi).The park is contained in the Lower Athabasca Region Land Use Framework finalized in 2012. The park is named for the Birch River that flows through it.

== Location ==
The park is in the Regional Municipality of Wood Buffalo, northeastern Alberta. The park borders Wood Buffalo National Park to the north, Kitaskino Nuwenëné Wildland Provincial Park to the east, and has a short southern border with Birch Mountains Wildland Provincial Park. The shape is a rough triangle. The longest side bordering Wood Buffalo is 93 km (58 mi) east to west. The height north to south is 76 km (47 mi). The only access is via aircraft at the airstrip near the Edra fire lookout tower.

== Ecology ==
The park protects an example of the Kazan Uplands subregion of the Canadian Shield region as well as the Northern Mixedwood and Peace–Athabasca Delta subregions of the Boreal Forest region in the Natural Regions Framework for Alberta. In the National Ecological Framework for Canada used by Environment and Climate Change Canada, the park is in the Birch Upland and North Birch Upland ecodistricts of the Mid-Boreal Uplands ecoregion of the Central Boreal Plains ecoprovince of the Boreal Plains ecozone. As well, the lower section of the park is in the Loon Lake Plain ecodistrict, Wabasca Lowland ecoregion, Central Boreal Plains ecoprovince, Boreal Plains ecozone. Under the OneEarth classification (previously World Wildlife Fund), the park is in the Mid-Canada Boreal Plains Forests ecoregion of the Mid-Canada Boreal Plains & Foothill Forests bioregion.

=== Geography ===
The park covers a ridge of the Birch Mountains running from the southwest to the northeast. In the northwest, the park drops down to the Birch and Peace River valleys and the Peace–Athabasca Delta. Elevations range from a high of 844 m (2,769 ft) in the mountains to a low of 265 m (869 ft) where the Birch River leaves the park.

=== Climate ===
The Köppen climate classification of the park is Continental, Subarctic (Dfc) characterized by long, cold winters, and short, warm to cool summers. Using the data from a weather stations within the park, Edra Auto at the fire lookout tower, for 1991 to 2020, the average daily temperatures exceeds 10 °C (50 °F) only for June, July, and August while average daily temperatures are less than 0 °C (32 °F) for November through March. At Edra Auto, the long-run average precipitation from 1991 to 2020 for the wettest month, July, is 114 mm (4.5 in) per month; conversely, the station receive less than 30 mm (1.2 in) per month from October through April.

=== Wildlife ===
The park is home to 68 species of concern including three that are listed under the Canadian Species at Risk Act such as the peregrine falcon, wood bison, and boreal woodland caribou. The park contains 13 per cent of the core habitat for the Red Earth caribou range.

== Activities ==
Human activity is significantly limited within the park. The park is remote, and access is only available via aircraft with prior authorization. Backcountry hiking and random backcountry camping are permitted; there are no developed campsites. Hunting and fishing are allowed with special permits.

== See also ==
- List of provincial parks in Alberta
- List of Canadian provincial parks
- List of national parks of Canada
