= Pearlwort =

Pearlwort is a common name for several plants and may refer to:

- Sagina
- Colobanthus
