= Gordon Lake (Alberta) =

- Location within Alberta
- Location: Alberta, Canada
- Coordinates: 56.4991667°N 110.4555556°W
- Type: Lake

Gordon Lake is a lake in Alberta, Canada.

It is named for William Gordon, a local postal employee.

== See also ==
- List of lakes of Alberta
