= Blackfriars Peak =

Mountain in Alberta, Canada

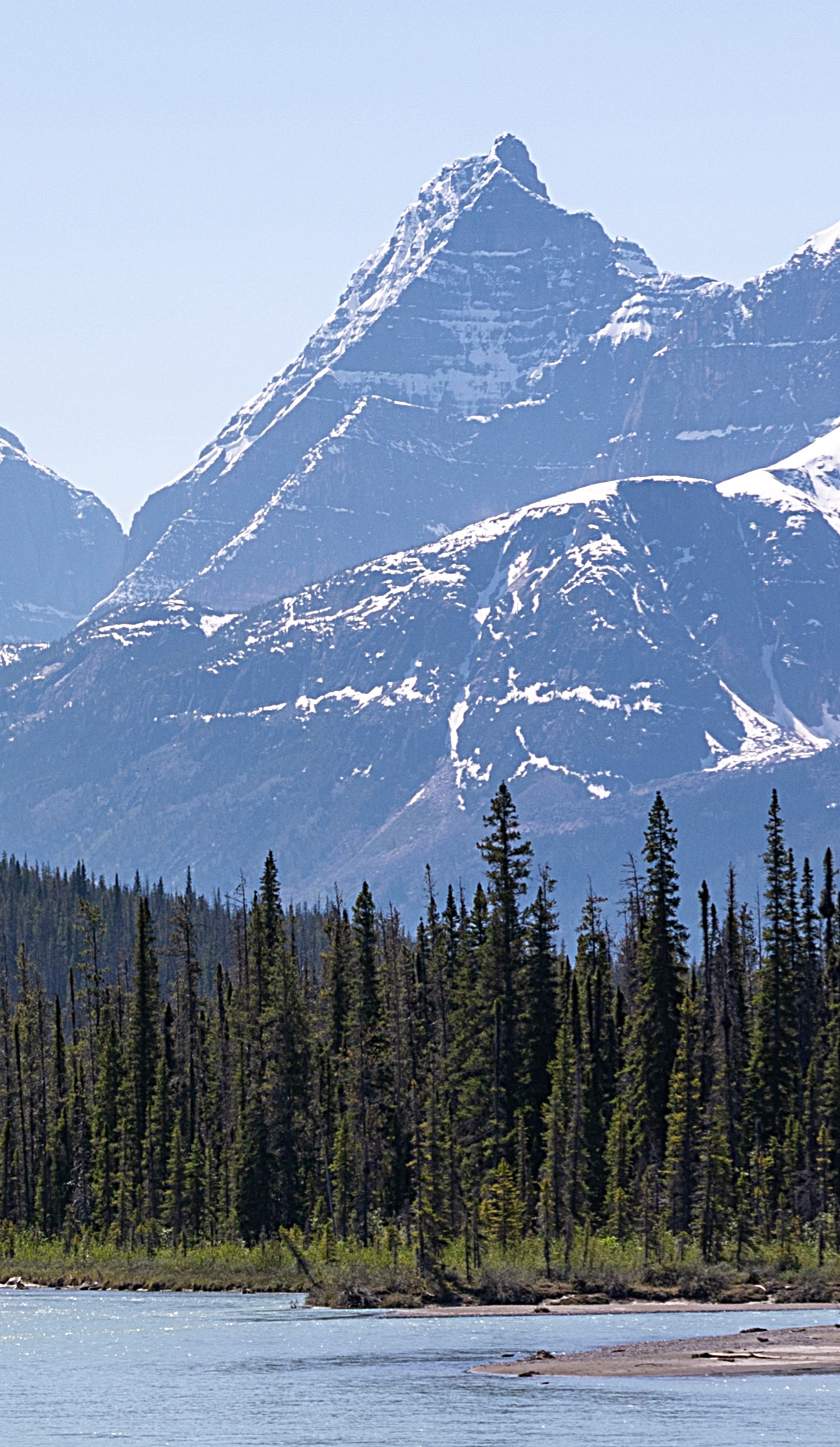
- North aspect

Highest point
- Elevation: 3,215 m (10,548 ft)
- Prominence: 609 m (1,998 ft)
- Isolation: 5.8 km (3.6 mi)
- Listing: Mountains of Alberta
- Coordinates: 52°19′33″N 117°37′04″W

Naming
- Etymology: Blackfriar

Geography
- Location within Alberta Location within Canada
- Interactive map of Blackfriars Peak
- Country: Canada
- Province: Alberta
- Protected area: Jasper National Park
- Parent range: Canadian Rockies
- Topo map: NTS 83C5 Fortress Lake

Climbing
- First ascent: 1953

Blackfriars Peak is a mountain in Alberta, Canada.

== Description ==
Blackfriars Peak is a 3,215-metre (10,548-foot) summit located at the head of the upper Athabasca River valley in the Canadian Rockies. It is situated within Jasper National Park, 70 kilometres (43.5 miles) south-southeast of the town of Jasper, and eight kilometres (5 miles) east of the Continental Divide of the Americas. Precipitation runoff from the mountain drains into tributaries of the Athabasca River. Topographic relief is significant as the summit rises 1,800 m (5,900 ft) above the Athabasca River in three kilometres (1.86 miles). The mountain can be seen from the Icefields Parkway, weather permitting. The nearest higher neighbor is Dais Mountain, 5.74 km (3.57 mi) to the south.

== History ==
The mountain was named in 1901 by Jean Habel who was a German geographer who explored the Canadian Rockies. He saw a resemblance between this peak and one in Europe with a similar name ("Schwartze Monche" which translates from German as black monks, or friars). The first ascent of the summit was made on July 8, 1953, by Gus E. Landt and Dr. A. MacIntosh, led by Walter Perren who was a Swiss climbing guide and Parks Canada service warden. The mountain's toponym was officially adopted on March 22, 1989, by the Geographical Names Board of Canada.

== Climate ==
Based on the Köppen climate classification, Blackfriars Peak is located in a subarctic climate zone with cold, snowy winters, and mild summers. Winter temperatures can drop below -20 °C with wind chill factors below -30 °C.

== Geology ==
The mountain is composed of sedimentary rock laid down during the Precambrian to Jurassic periods and pushed east and over the top of younger rock during the Laramide orogeny.

== Gallery ==
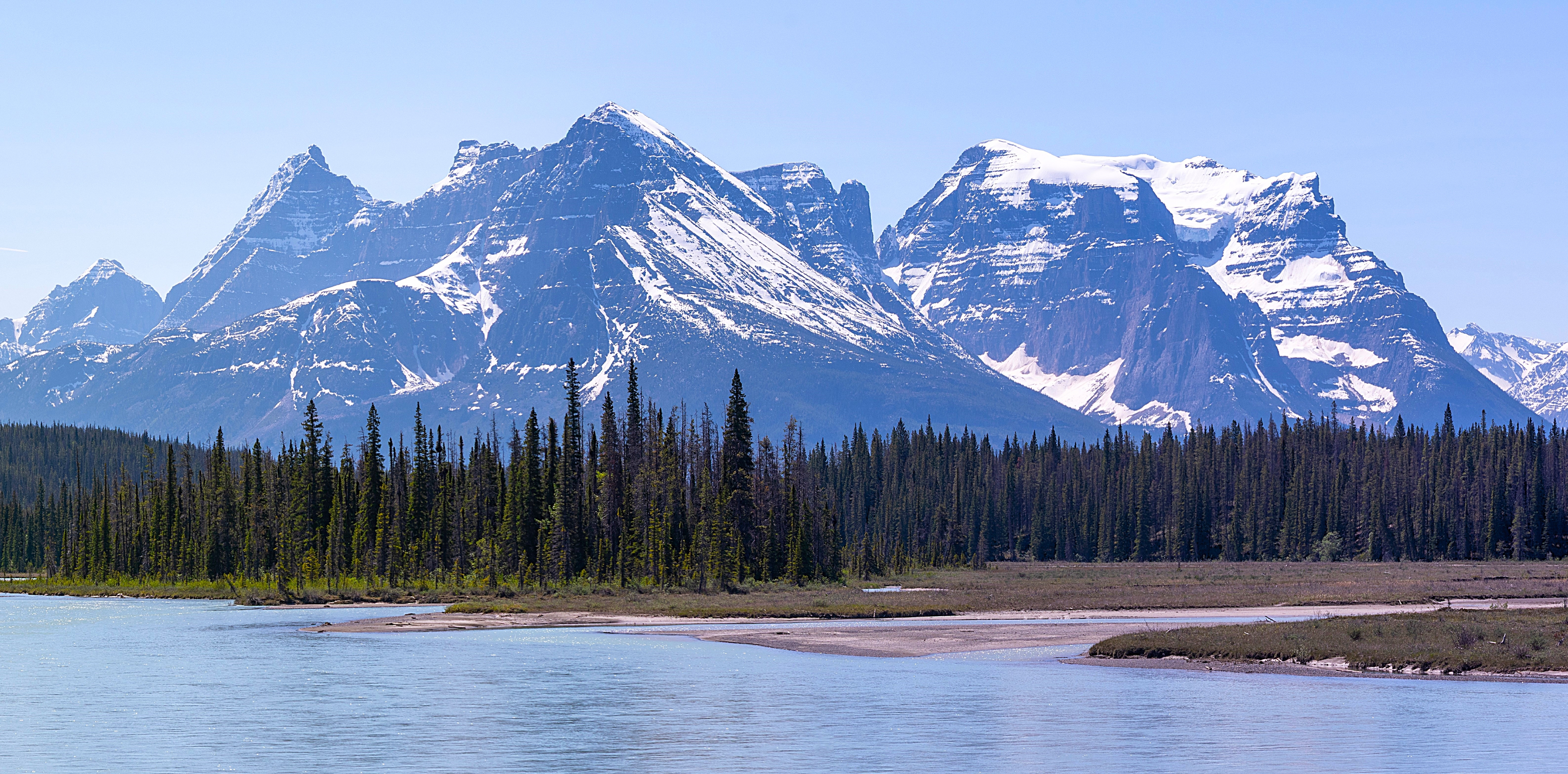
Blackfriars Peak (left) and Mount Quincy (right).
Athabasca River in foreground.

== See also ==
- Geography of Alberta
- Geology of the Rocky Mountains
- List of mountains in the Canadian Rockies
