= Grande Yellowhead Public School Division No. 77 =

School district in Alberta, Canada

Grande Yellowhead Public School Division

Location
- 3656 1st Avenue; Edson, Alberta, Canada Canada
- Coordinates: 53°35′10″N 116°24′11″W

District information
- Superintendent: Carolyn Lewis
- Chair of the board: Dale Karpluk
- Schools: 17
- Budget: CA$61.5 million (2013/2014)

Students and staff
- Students: 4,555

Other information
- Website: www.gypsd.ca

Grande Yellowhead Public School Division (GYPSD) is a public school board that serves the Yellowhead County. GYPSD operates schools in Evansburg, Wildwood, Niton, Fulham, Edson, Hinton, Grande Cache, Jasper as well as rural schools in the area. The division's name was originally called Grande Yellowhead Regional Division No. 35 until it was changed to Grande Yellowhead Public School Division No. 77 in 2009.

== Schools ==
Edson

- Fulham School (K-6)
- Mary Bergeron Elementary School (K-5)
- Parkland Composite High School (9-12 English, French)
- École Pine Grove Middle School (6-8 English, French)
- Ecole Westhaven Elementary School (K-5 English, French)

Hinton

- Crescent Valley Elementary School (K-7)
- Harry Collinge High School (8-12 English, French)
- Ecole Mountain View Elementary School (K-7 English, French)

Jasper

- Ecole Jasper Elementary School (K-6 English, French)
- Jasper Junior Senior High School (7–12)

Grande Cache

- Grande Cache Community High School (9–12)
- Sheldon Coates Elementary School (K-3)
- Summitview School (4–8)

Lobstick

- Evansview School (K-6)
- Grand Trunk High School (7–12)
- Niton Central School (K-9)
- Wildwood School (K-6)
