= Jasper Junior Senior High School =

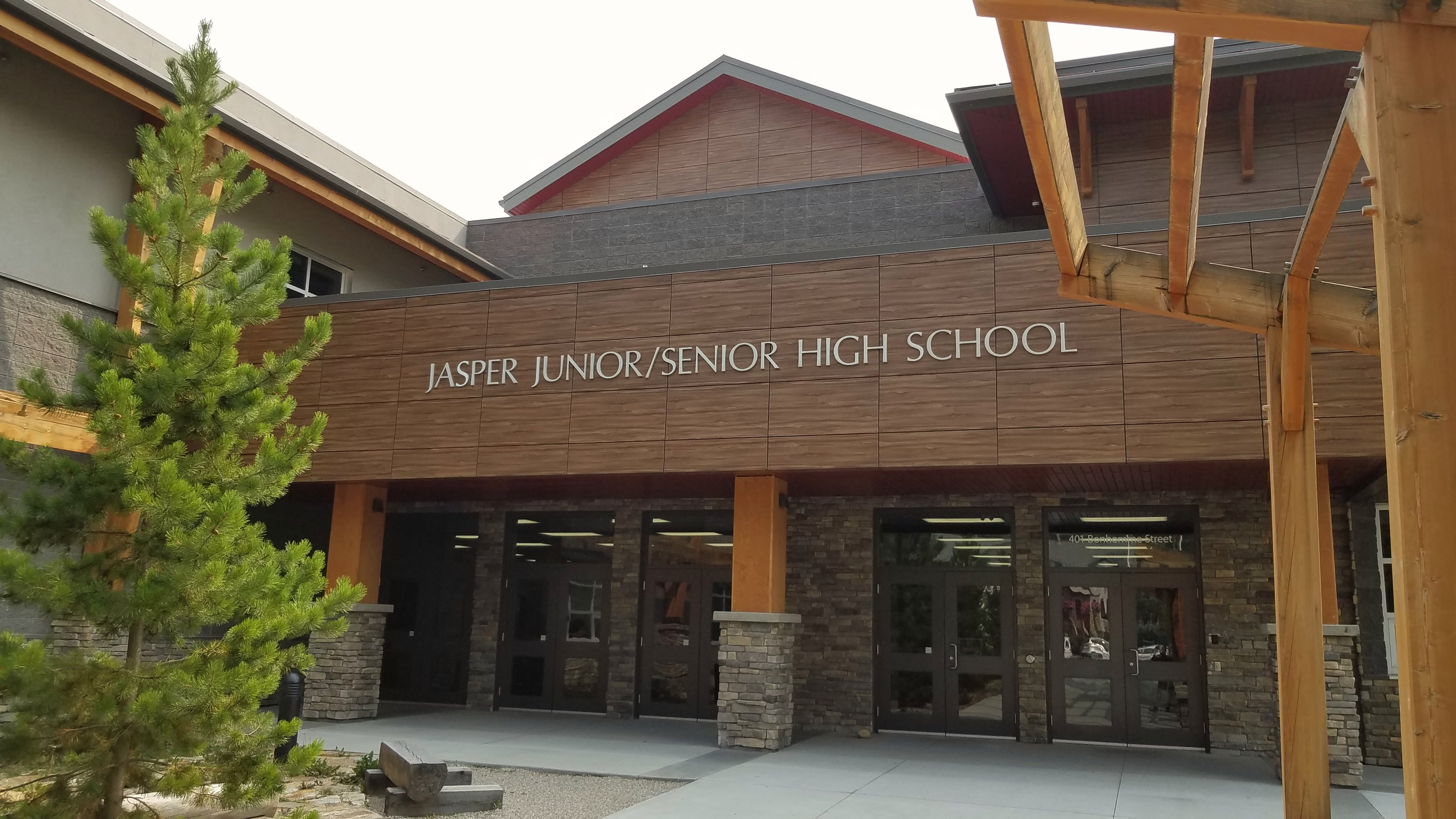
- Jasper Junior Senior High School entrance

Location
- 401 Bonhomme Street; Jasper, Alberta, T0E 1E0; Canada; 52°52′45″N 118°05′00″W

Information
- Type: Public junior high school / senior high school
- Founded: 1952
- School board: Grande Yellowhead Public School Division No. 77
- Principal: Mark Crozier
- Grades: 7-12
- Enrollment: 241 (September 2008)
- Language: English, French
- Team name: Cougars
- Website: jasperhigh.ca

Jasper Junior Senior High School (JHS) is a public high school located in Jasper, Alberta, Canada.

== Building ==
The school is housed in a building of masonry construction that was first made erect in 1952. Additions were made in 1958, 1967 and 1988, and the building has a current floor area of 4,455 square metres (47,953 sq ft).
