= Jasper to Banff Relay =

Relay race

The Jasper to Banff Relay was a long-distance running relay race that used to cover 258 km (160 miles) between Jasper, Alberta and Banff, Alberta. The Jasper to Banff relay ran from the years 1980 to the year 2000. In the year 2005 a revised version of the race was started, the Banff Jasper Relay. The Banff Jasper Relay is still held every year on the first Saturday in June.

The Banff Jasper Relay consists of 15 stages utilizing almost exclusively the very scenic Bow Valley Parkway and Icefields Parkway. The race is run on the left shoulder of these highways, facing oncoming traffic. Highways remain open for vehicles on race day.

The relay consists of 2 phases run simultaneously:

- Phase 1 has 6 stages from Banff to Saskatchewan River Crossing.
- Phase 2 has 9 stages from Saskatchewan River Crossing to Jasper.

Team results are based on the cumulative times for both phases of the relay added together.
