= Harry Collinge High School =

Location
- 158 - Sunwapta Drive; Hinton, Alberta, T7V 1T7; Canada; 53.4150°N 117.5578°W

Information
- School type: Public
- Motto: Respect, Compassion, & Responsibility
- School board: Grande Yellowhead Public School Division No. 77
- Superintendent: Carolyn Lewis-Shillington
- Principal: Kurt Scobie
- Grades: 8-12
- Enrollment: 459 (2023–24)
- Language: Programs offered in English and French
- Colours: Green and Gold
- Mascot: Howler the Wolf
- Team name: Rockies (Basketball); Wolfpak (Football)
- Website: harrycollinge.gypsd.ca

Harry Collinge High School (HCHS) is a public high school located in Hinton, Alberta, Canada. Founded in 1957 as Hardisty School, it was renamed in 1969 as Harry Collinge High School after Harry Collinge, the first manager of North Western Pulp and Power (now Hinton Pulp - A Division of West Fraser Mills Ltd).
