= Wyatt Tremblay =

Canadian editorial cartoonist

Wyatt Tremblay is a Canadian editorial cartoonist who has worked for the Yukon News since 1992.

== Personal life ==
Born in 1960 in Jasper, Alberta, he completed his schooling at F.H. Collins high school in Whitehorse, Yukon in 1978, with the intention of becoming an accountant but with the desire to become a cartoonist. He worked at many different jobs, except as an accountant, until he landed the position of editorial cartoonist for the Yukon News in 1992. This has led to numerous awards from the Canadian Newspaper Association, B.C./Yukon Newspaper Association and the B.C. Newspaper Foundation. He is also a member of the Association of Canadian Editorial Cartoonists. In 2003, he published a retrospective book on Yukon politics for the years 1992 to 2003.
