= Decoigne, Alberta =

Coordinates: 52.884°N 118.371°W

Decoigne is a locality in Alberta, Canada. It is located west of Jasper, near the border with British Columbia.

The community has the name of François Decoigne, a fur trader.
