= Holy Redeemer Junior Senior Catholic High School =

Holy Redeemer Catholic Junior Senior High School

Location
- 4912 12 Avenue; Edson, Alberta, T7E 1S7; Canada; 53.5915°N 116.4370°W

Information
- School type: Separate Secondary
- Religious affiliation: Roman Catholic
- Founded: 2003 (Holy Redeemer)
- School board: Living Waters Catholic Regional Division No. 42
- Superintendent: Carol Lemay
- Area trustee: Gemma Christie
- Principal: Betty Churchill
- Grades: 7–12
- Enrollment: 420
- Language: English
- Colours: Black and Gold
- Team name: Rebels
- Website: www.holyredeemerhigh.ca

Holy Redeemer Junior Senior Catholic High School (HRH) is a Catholic high school located in Edson, Alberta, Canada.
