= Grande Cache Community High School =

Location
- 10601 Shand Avenue; Grande Cache, Alberta, T0E 0Y0; Canada; 53.8888883°N 119.1274088°W

Information
- School type: Public
- Founded: 1969
- School board: Grande Yellowhead Public School Division No. 77
- Principal: John Hammer
- Grades: 9-12
- Enrollment: 200 (September 2023)
- Language: English
- Team name: Grande Cache Rams
- Website: grandecacheschool.gypsd.ca

Grande Cache Community High School (GCCHS) is a public high school located in Grande Cache, Alberta, Canada.

In May 2017 Grand Cache Community High School completed renovations intended to modernize the school.

The school houses Grande Cache's public library.
