= Parkland Composite High School =

Location
- 4630 - 12 Avenue; Edson, Alberta, T7E 1S7; Canada; 53.5936°N 116.4303°W

Information
- School type: Public Secondary School
- Founded: 1968
- School board: Grande Yellowhead Public School Division No. 77
- Superintendent: Kurt Scobie
- Area trustee: Tracy Acorn; Audra Bowman
- Principal: Kristin Basaraba
- Grades: 9–12
- Enrollment: 567 (September 2009)
- Language: English, French immersion
- Colours: Blue and White
- Team name: Pacers
- Website: www.parklandcomposite.ca

Parkland Composite High School (PCHS) is a public high school located in Edson, Alberta, Canada. Parkland Composite High School offers various courses for grades 9 through 12 and is part of the Grande Yellowhead Public School Division No. 77. The school is also home to a French immersion program that provides grade 9 math and science courses in French and also has French Language Arts classes available for grades 9 through 12.
