= Living Waters Catholic Regional Division No. 42 =

School district in Alberta, Canada

Location
- 4204 Kepler Street, Box 1949; Whitecourt, Alberta, Canada Canada

Other information
- Website: www.livingwaters.ab.ca

Living Waters Catholic Regional Division No. 42 or Living Waters Catholic School Division is a separate school authority within the Canadian province of Alberta operated out of Whitecourt.

== Schools ==
- Across the Waters Outreach, Whitecourt (7-12)
- École St. Anne School, Whitecourt (PK-3)
- École St. Joseph, Whitecourt (7-12)
- École St. Mary, Whitecourt (4-6)
- Holy Redeemer Junior Senior Catholic High School, Edson (7-12)
- St. Francis of Assisi Catholic Academy, Slave Lake (7-12)
- St. Mary of the Lake Catholic School, Slave Lake (PK-6)
- Vanier Community Catholic School, Edson

== See also ==
- List of school authorities in Alberta
