= Coat of arms of Edson, Alberta =

Heraldic symbol of Edson, Canada

- Armiger: Edson, Alberta
- Adopted: 2019
- Crest: A great grey owl Azure issuant from a mural crown Argent set with gouttes de poix and flames Azure;
- Shield: Per fess Azure and Argent a fess bretessé counterchanged between in chief two lozenges Argent each charged with a pine tree Vert and in base a lozenge Sable;
- Supporters: Two red squirrels each holding a pinecone and sejant on a log proper;

The coat of arms of Edson, Alberta is the heraldic symbol representing the town of Edson, Alberta.

The administration of Edson presented to the council a possibility to have a coat of arms. It would cost from $2,000 to 3,500 for the artwork and research as well as 15 months to complete.

== Symbolism ==
The coat of arms pay homage to the Grand Trunk Pacific Railway on which Edson was developed as well as the local economy which consists of coal, oil, gas and forestry.

The crenellated band evokes railways crucial role in the founding of the town of Edson. The conifers, which are present in the city logo, symbolise the importance of the forest industry. The white diamond surrounding said conifers represent the baseball diamonds at Edson's Vision Park. The black diamond at the bottom symbolizes coal.

The great grey owl is a local species. The crown of masrony which the owl stands upon, symbolizes local authority. The drops and flames evokes the oil and gas industries of Edson.

The two red squirrels whom serve as supporters are inspired by Eddie. The city's mascot which has a 12-foot statue in Edson's RCMP park.

== Blazon ==
The coat of arms as described by the Canadian Heraldic Authority is:

Arms: Per fess Azure and Argent a fess bretessé counterchanged between in chief two lozenges Argent each charged with a pine tree Vert and in base a lozenge Sable;

Crest: A great grey owl Azure issuant from a mural crown Argent set with gouttes de poix and flames Azure;

Supporters: Two red squirrels each holding a pinecone and sejant on a log proper;
