= Grande Cache Institution =

Prison in Alberta, Canada

- Location in Alberta
- Location: Grande Cache, Alberta; 53°51′49″N 119°08′35″W
- Security class: Medium security
- Capacity: 448
- Population: 370
- Managed by: Correctional Service Canada

Grande Cache Institution is a medium security prison located in Grande Cache, Alberta.

== History ==
The facility was opened in 1985 and operated by the province of Alberta (Correctional Services of the Ministry of Solicitor General and Public Security) as the Grande Cache Correctional Centre until 1995. At that time, Correctional Service of Canada took possession of the property under a long-term lease from the province. The lease was renewed in 2018.

While operated by the province of Alberta, the facility housed a Special Housing Unit.

As a federal institution, it was previously operated as a minimum security prison. However, it was converted to medium security in 2009/2010.

In September 2022, and again in January 2024, substantial amounts of contraband were seized in the facility.

Nicolas Hovanesian and Mohammed Karim filed complaints of discrimination in 2015 against the institution.
