= Jasper, Alberta =

Jasper
- Specialized municipality
- Municipality of Jasper
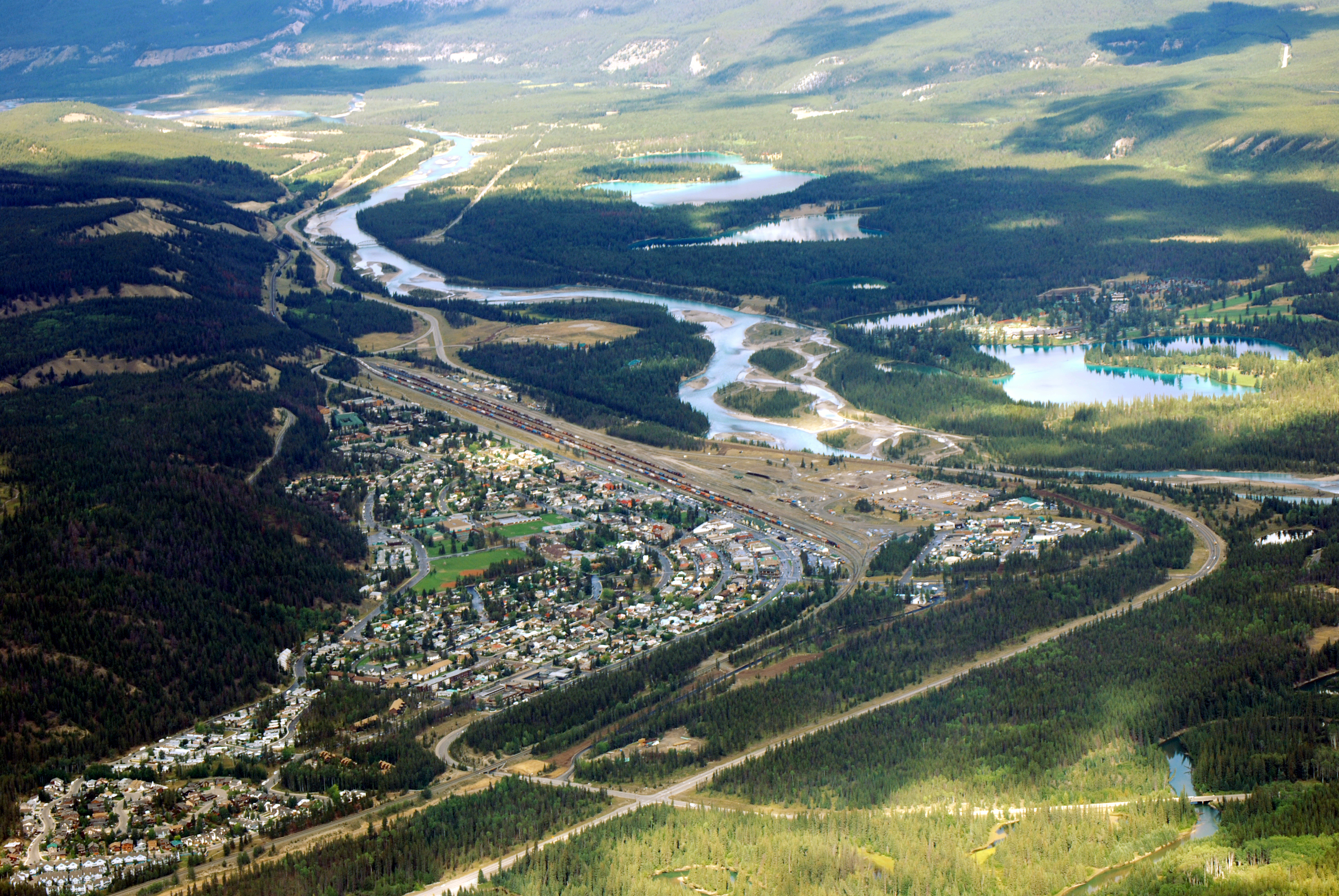
- View of Jasper from the Jasper Tramway

- Location within Alberta
- Coordinates: 52°52′23″N 118°04′56″W
- Country: Canada
- Province: Alberta
- Region: Alberta's Rockies
- Census division: 15
- Founded: 1813
- Incorporated: Improvement district: August 31, 1995
- Specialized municipality: July 20, 2001

Government
  - Mayor: Richard Ireland
  - Governing bodies: Jasper Municipal Council and Parks Canada
  - MP: See Yellowhead
  - MLA: See West Yellowhead

Area (2021)
  - Land: 921.9 km^{2} (355.9 sq mi)
- Elevation: 1,060 m (3,480 ft)

Population (2021)
  - Total: 4,738
  - Density: 5.1/km^{2} (13/sq mi)
- Time zone: UTC−06:00 (Alberta Time)
- Postal code span: T0E
- Area codes: +1-780, +1-587
- Highways: Highway 16 (TCH) (Yellowhead Highway); Highway 93 (Icefields Parkway); Highway 93A (Hazel Avenue)
- Waterways: Athabasca River; Miette River
- Public transit service: Jasper Transit
- Railways: Canadian National Railway
- Website: jasper-alberta.com

Jasper is a specialized municipality and townsite in western Alberta within the Canadian Rockies. The townsite is in the Athabasca River valley and is the commercial centre of Jasper National Park.

== History ==
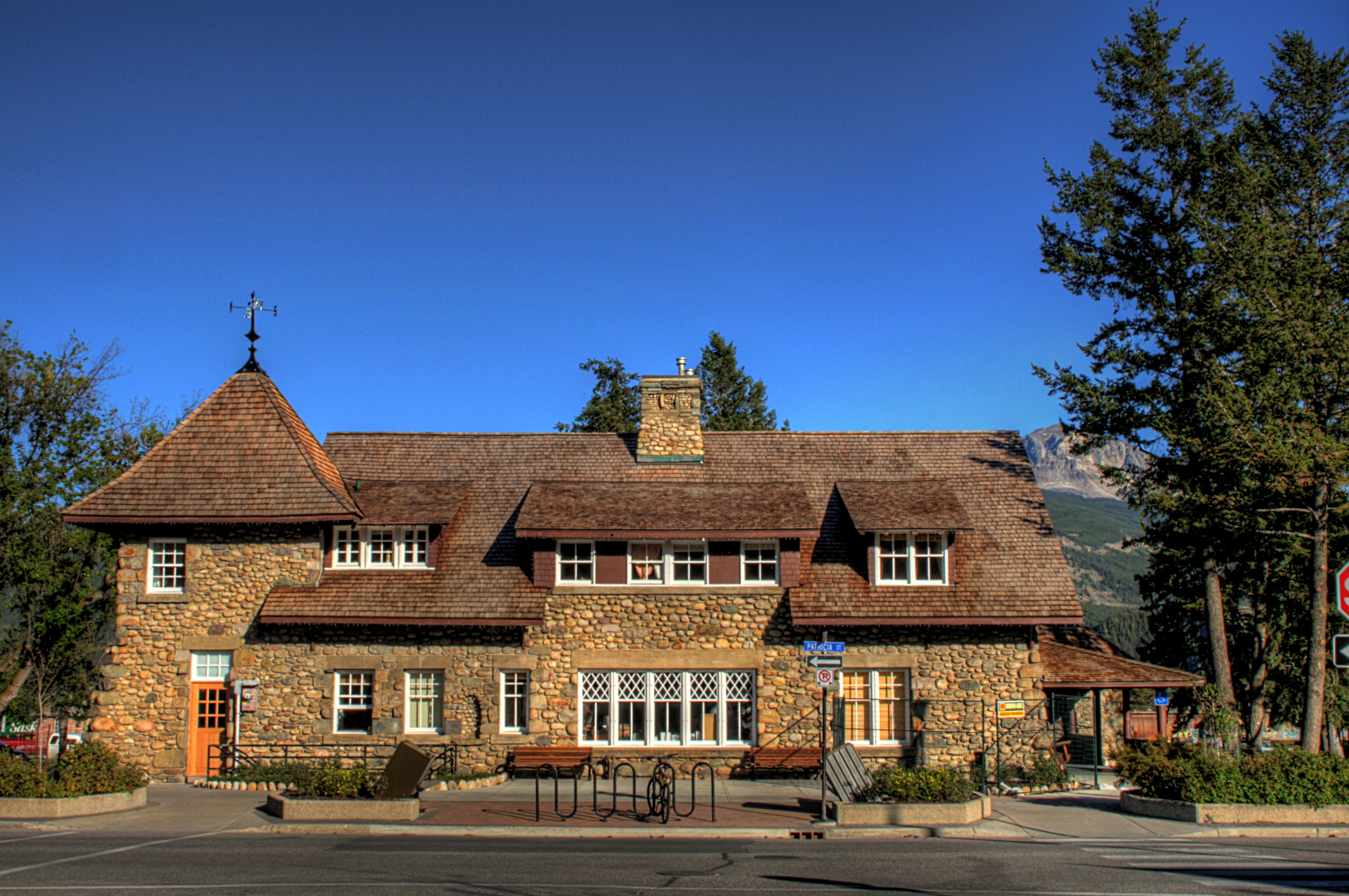
The Jasper Information Centre

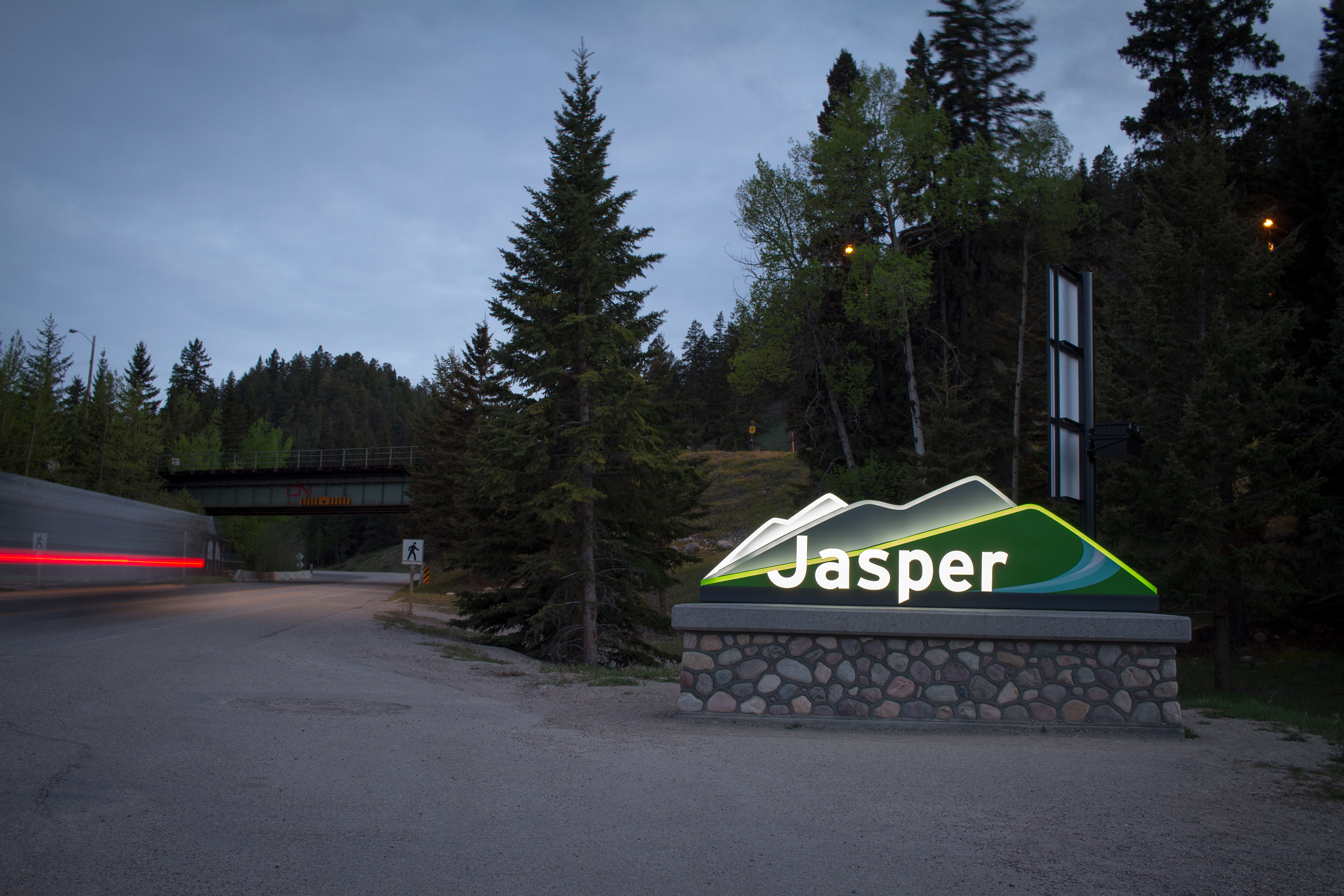
The Jasper Welcome Sign at the north entrance to town, 2022.

Established in 1813, Jasper House was first a fur trade outpost of the North West Company, and later Hudson's Bay Company, on the York Factory Express trade route to what was then called "New Caledonia" (now British Columbia) and Fort Vancouver on the lower Columbia River. Jasper House was 35 km north of today's town of Jasper.

Jasper Forest Park was established in 1907. The railway divisional point at the location of the future townsite was established by the Grand Trunk Pacific Railway in 1911 and originally named Fitzhugh after a Grand Trunk vice president (along the Grand Trunk's "alphabet" line). The Canadian Northern Railway began service to its Jasper Park station in 1912, about 700 m from GTP's Fitzhugh station. The townsite was surveyed in 1913 by H. Matheson. It was renamed Jasper after the former fur trade post. An internment camp of Ukrainian Canadians, suspected by virtue of their place of birth of having enemy loyalties, was in operation at Dominion Park in Jasper from February 1916 to August 1916.

Jasper Forest Park was renamed Jasper National Park in 1930. By 1931, Jasper was accessible by road from Edmonton. In 1940, the scenic Icefields Parkway opened, connecting Jasper to Lake Louise and Banff in Banff National Park.

The first step towards incorporation of Jasper occurred on August 31, 1995, when the Jasper Improvement District was formed from a portion of Improvement District No. 12 (Jasper National Park). The improvement district was subsequently incorporated as a specialized municipality under the name of the Municipality of Jasper on July 20, 2001. The incorporation order established the Jasper townsite as the Town of Jasper and the surrounding balance of the specialized municipality as a rural service area that was deemed equivalent to a municipal district.

The Jasper wildfire began on July 22, 2024 and destroyed 358 buildings, one-third of the town's structures, causing an estimated $1.23 billion in damages. The high cost was partly due to Jasper's geographical isolation, which made transporting materials into the town and moving debris out more difficult. The Alberta and federal governments supplied $170 million in funding to the town; $30 million went towards construction of temporary and permanent housing, and the rest went to Parks Canada for recovery work in Jasper National Park. By May 2025, insurance companies had finished clearing debris, and Parks Canada had issued 100 permits to start rebuilding houses destroyed in the fire.

== Geography ==
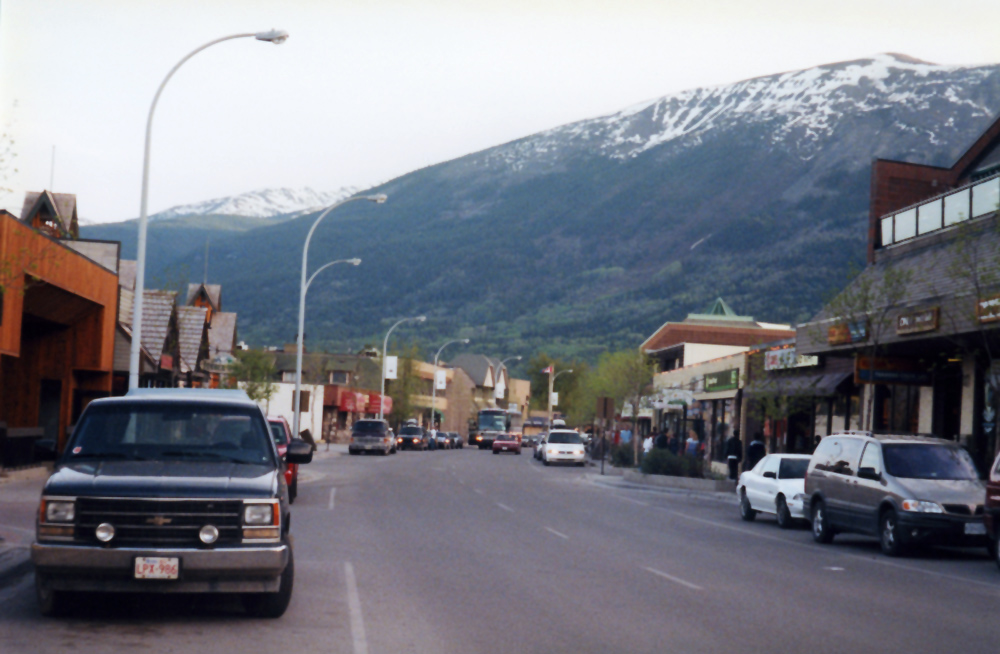
Downtown Jasper in 2002

The Municipality of Jasper is in the western portion of the province of Alberta within Jasper National Park. It borders the province of British Columbia to the west and Improvement District No. 12 to the north, east, and south. The Athabasca River, which originates from the Columbia Icefield, meanders northward through the municipality. The Miette River, Maligne River, and Snaring River all discharge into the Athabasca River within the Municipality of Jasper's limits.

The Jasper townsite, which is approximately 362 kilometres (225 mi) west of Edmonton, 290 kilometres (180 mi) north of Banff, and 28 kilometres (17 mi) east of the Yellowhead Pass, is at the intersection of Highway 16 (Yellowhead Highway) and Highway 93 (Icefields Parkway). It is near the confluence of the Athabasca River and Miette River. It lies between the Victoria Cross Ranges (northwest), Pyramid Mountain (north), Maligne Range (southeast) and Trident Ridge (southwest). Lakes near the Jasper townsite include Pyramid Lake, Patricia Lake, Lake Annette, Lake Edith, Lac Beauvert, Maligne Lake, and Medicine Lake.

=== Localities ===
The following localities are located within the Municipality of Jasper.

- Bedson
- Decoigne
- Geikie
- Henry House
- Jasper
- Jasper Lodge
- Jasper National Park
- Jasper Park Lodge
- Medicine Lake
- Miette Hot Springs
- Sixth Bridge
- Wynd

=== Climate ===
Jasper experiences a borderline Humid Continental/Subarctic climate (Köppen climate classification Dfb/Dfc). The highest temperature ever recorded in Jasper was 41.2 °C (106 °F) on June 30, 2021. The coldest temperature ever recorded was −47.2 °C (−53 °F) on January 24, 1916.

Summers in Jasper are pleasant, with daily highs usually around 21.1 °C (70 °F) and lows around 7.2 °C (45 °F). Winters are cold, though may be considered mild by Canadian standards, with daily highs around −2.2 °C (28 °F) and lows around −11.7 °C (11 °F).

Climate data for Jasper, 1981−2010 normals, extremes 1914−present
| Month | Jan | Feb | Mar | Apr | May | Jun | Jul | Aug | Sep | Oct | Nov | Dec | Year |
|---|---|---|---|---|---|---|---|---|---|---|---|---|---|
| Record high °C (°F) | 13.3 (55.9) | 16.5 (61.7) | 20.8 (69.4) | 26.5 (79.7) | 30.4 (86.7) | 41.2 (106.2) | 39.4 (102.9) | 35.0 (95.0) | 33.7 (92.7) | 27.2 (81.0) | 18.0 (64.4) | 15.0 (59.0) | 41.2 (106.2) |
| Mean daily maximum °C (°F) | −3.3 (26.1) | −0.4 (31.3) | 5.7 (42.3) | 10.9 (51.6) | 16.1 (61.0) | 19.6 (67.3) | 21.9 (71.4) | 21.7 (71.1) | 16.7 (62.1) | 10.0 (50.0) | 0.4 (32.7) | −4.7 (23.5) | 9.6 (49.3) |
| Daily mean °C (°F) | −8 (18) | −5.8 (21.6) | −0.4 (31.3) | 4.5 (40.1) | 9.4 (48.9) | 13.1 (55.6) | 15.2 (59.4) | 14.6 (58.3) | 10.0 (50.0) | 4.4 (39.9) | −4 (25) | −9.1 (15.6) | 3.6 (38.5) |
| Mean daily minimum °C (°F) | −12.7 (9.1) | −11.2 (11.8) | −6.5 (20.3) | −2 (28) | 2.6 (36.7) | 6.6 (43.9) | 8.4 (47.1) | 7.4 (45.3) | 3.2 (37.8) | −1.3 (29.7) | −8.3 (17.1) | −13.5 (7.7) | −2.3 (27.9) |
| Record low °C (°F) | −47.2 (−53.0) | −43.3 (−45.9) | −36.7 (−34.1) | −28.9 (−20.0) | −17.8 (0.0) | −6.7 (19.9) | −3.4 (25.9) | −3 (27) | −12.2 (10.0) | −28.7 (−19.7) | −38.8 (−37.8) | −43.9 (−47.0) | −47.2 (−53.0) |
| Average precipitation mm (inches) | 23.4 (0.92) | 14.3 (0.56) | 16.8 (0.66) | 19.7 (0.78) | 31.1 (1.22) | 51.0 (2.01) | 63.8 (2.51) | 64.5 (2.54) | 33.7 (1.33) | 30.5 (1.20) | 24.4 (0.96) | 19.5 (0.77) | 392.6 (15.46) |
| Average rainfall mm (inches) | 6.1 (0.24) | 3.8 (0.15) | 6.2 (0.24) | 13.2 (0.52) | 30.4 (1.20) | 50.4 (1.98) | 63.8 (2.51) | 64.6 (2.54) | 32.2 (1.27) | 23.1 (0.91) | 9.4 (0.37) | 2.2 (0.09) | 305.2 (12.02) |
| Average snowfall cm (inches) | 23.9 (9.4) | 14.7 (5.8) | 15.0 (5.9) | 8.1 (3.2) | 0.75 (0.30) | 0.57 (0.22) | 0.0 (0.0) | 0.0 (0.0) | 2.5 (1.0) | 9.3 (3.7) | 20.8 (8.2) | 24.4 (9.6) | 120.0 (47.2) |
| Average precipitation days (≥ 0.2 mm) | 10.6 | 7.9 | 8.1 | 8.9 | 11.1 | 13.9 | 14.1 | 14.7 | 10.5 | 9.8 | 10.4 | 9.6 | 129.6 |
| Average rainy days (≥ 0.2 mm) | 1.7 | 1.5 | 2.6 | 6.0 | 10.9 | 13.9 | 14.1 | 14.7 | 10.0 | 7.7 | 2.9 | 0.8 | 86.9 |
| Average snowy days (≥ 0.2 cm) | 9.9 | 7.1 | 6.8 | 4.1 | 0.73 | 0.07 | 0.0 | 0.0 | 0.60 | 2.7 | 8.4 | 9.5 | 49.9 |
| Mean monthly sunshine hours | 71.7 | 98.4 | 164.4 | 199.6 | 227.1 | 226.1 | 251.5 | 237.3 | 177.2 | 131.0 | 71.8 | 56.5 | 1,912.5 |
| Percentage possible sunshine | 28.2 | 35.5 | 44.8 | 47.8 | 46.4 | 44.8 | 49.6 | 51.9 | 46.4 | 39.7 | 27.4 | 23.7 | 40.5 |
Source: Environment Canada

== Demographics ==
Federal census population history
| Year | Pop. | ±% |
|---|---|---|
| 1991 | 3,567 | — |
| 1996 | 4,301 | +20.6% |
| 2001 | 4,180 | −2.8% |
| 2006 | 4,265 | +2.0% |
| 2011 | 4,432 | +3.9% |
| 2016 | 4,590 | +3.6% |
| 2021 | 4,738 | +3.2% |
Source: Statistics Canada

In the 2021 Census of Population conducted by Statistics Canada, the Municipality of Jasper had a population of 4,738 living in 1,674 of its 1,910 total private dwellings, a change of 3.2% from its 2016 population of 4,590. With a land area of 921.9 km^{2} (355.9 sq mi), it had a population density of 5.1/km^{2} (13.3/sq mi) in 2021.

In the 2016 Census of Population conducted by Statistics Canada, the Municipality of Jasper had a population of 4,590 living in 1,576 of its 1,702 total private dwellings, a change of 3.6% from its 2011 population of 4,432. With a land area of 924.06 km^{2} (356.78 sq mi), it had a population density of 5.0/km^{2} (12.9/sq mi) in 2016.

Municipality of Jasper population breakdown – 2011 municipal census
| Component | Permanent population | Shadow population | Total population |
|---|---|---|---|
| Town of Jasper | unpublished | | 4,152 |
| Rural service area | unpublished | | 1,084 |
| Total Municipality of Jasper | 4,584 | 652 | 5,236 |

The population of the Municipality of Jasper according to its 2011 municipal census is 5,236, a change of 10.3% over its 2008 municipal census population of 4,745. Jasper's 2011 population of 5,236 comprises 4,584 permanent and 652 non-permanent residents, while its 2007 census counted 4,235 permanent and 510 non-permanent residents.

== Attractions ==
The Fairmont Jasper Park Lodge, the Marmot Basin ski resort, and the Jasper Skytram, which carries visitors to The Whistlers' summit, are all near the townsite. Within the Jasper townsite are the heritage building of the Jasper Visitor Centre, the heritage building St. Mary & St. George Anglican Church, and the Jasper-Yellowhead Museum.

== Government ==
Governance of Jasper is shared between the municipality and Parks Canada, an agency of the federal government.

== Transportation ==
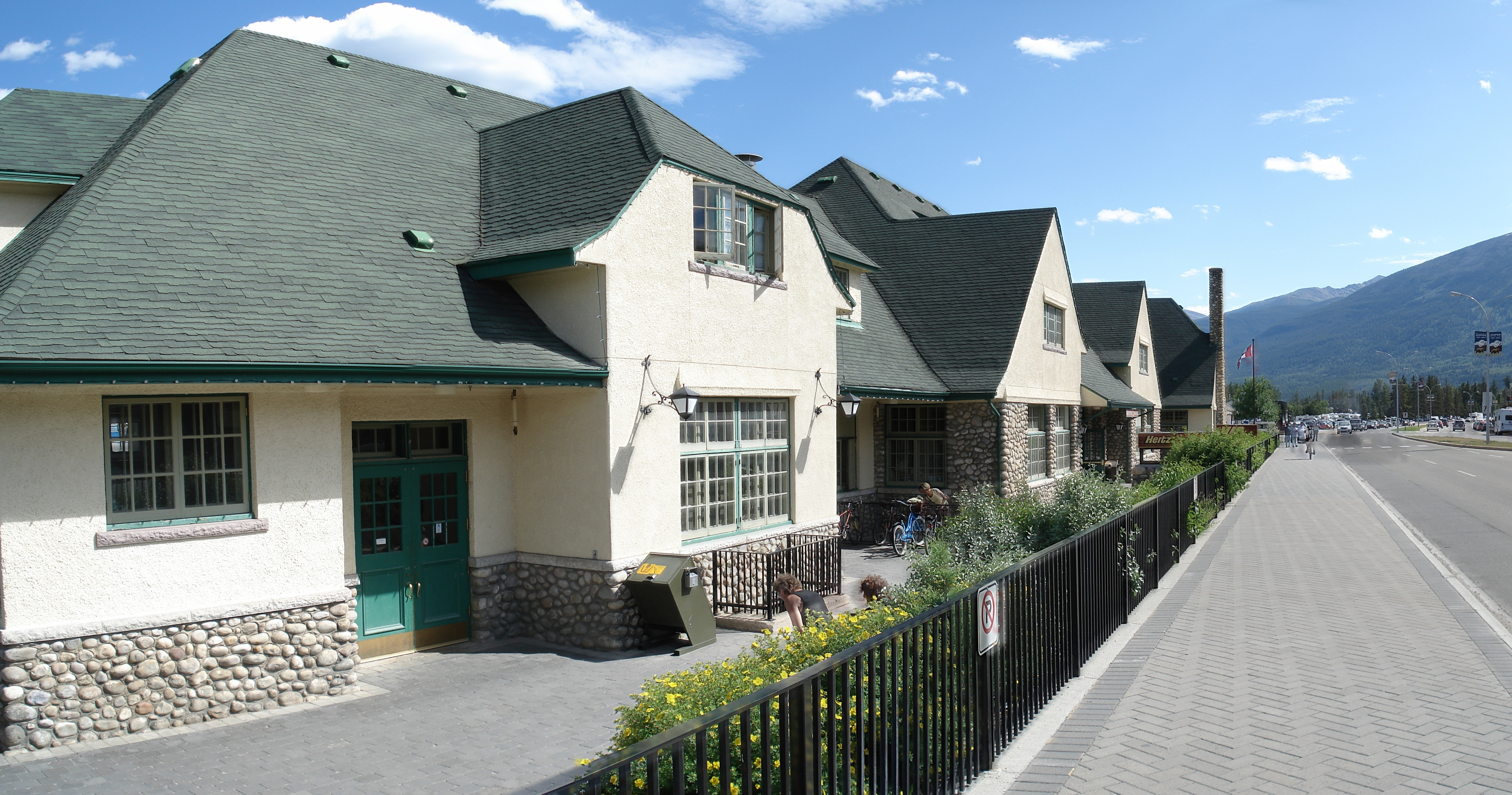
Jasper railway station, seen from Connaught Drive

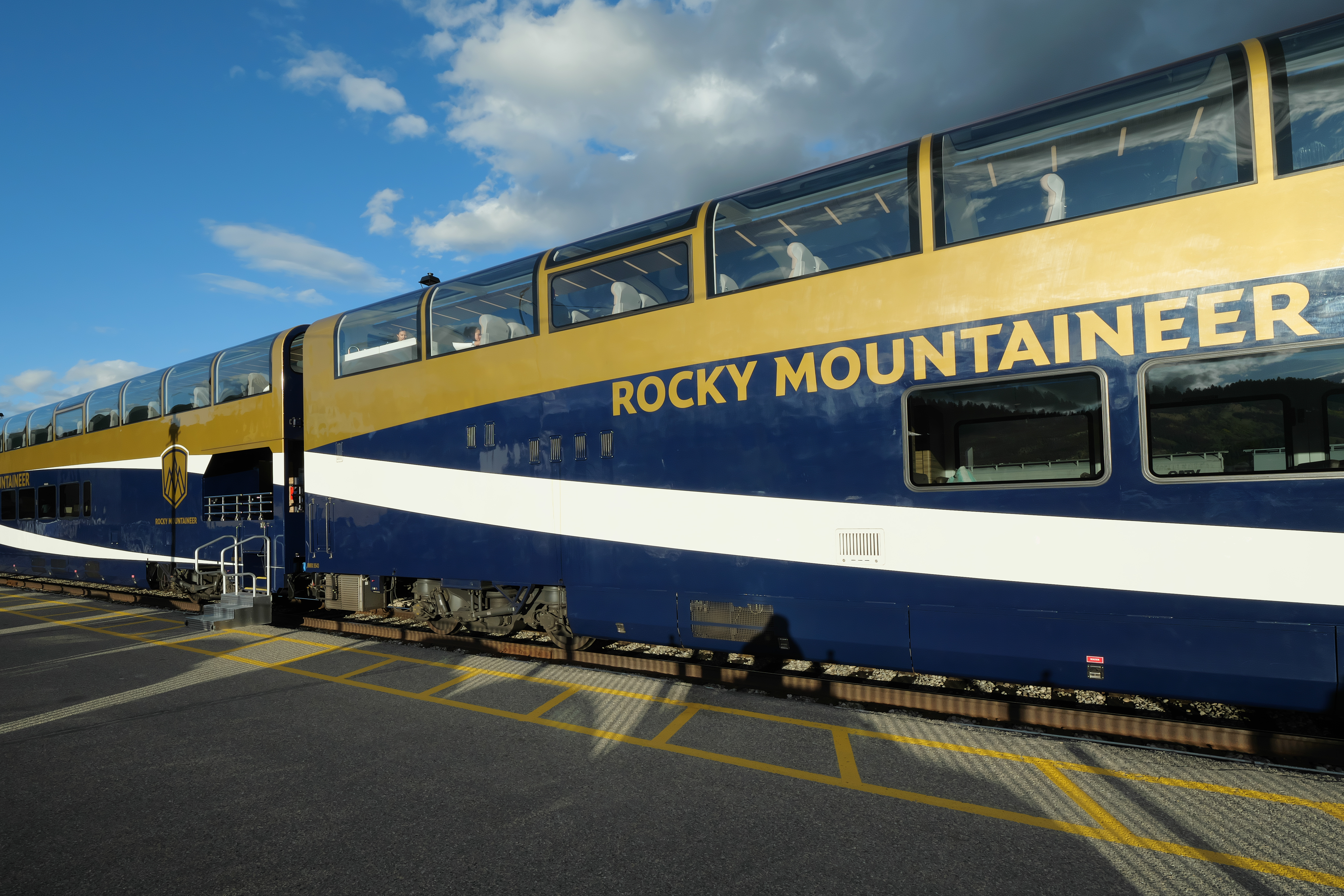
Two Goldleaf double-deck panorama cars of the Rocky Mountaineer in the station of Jasper

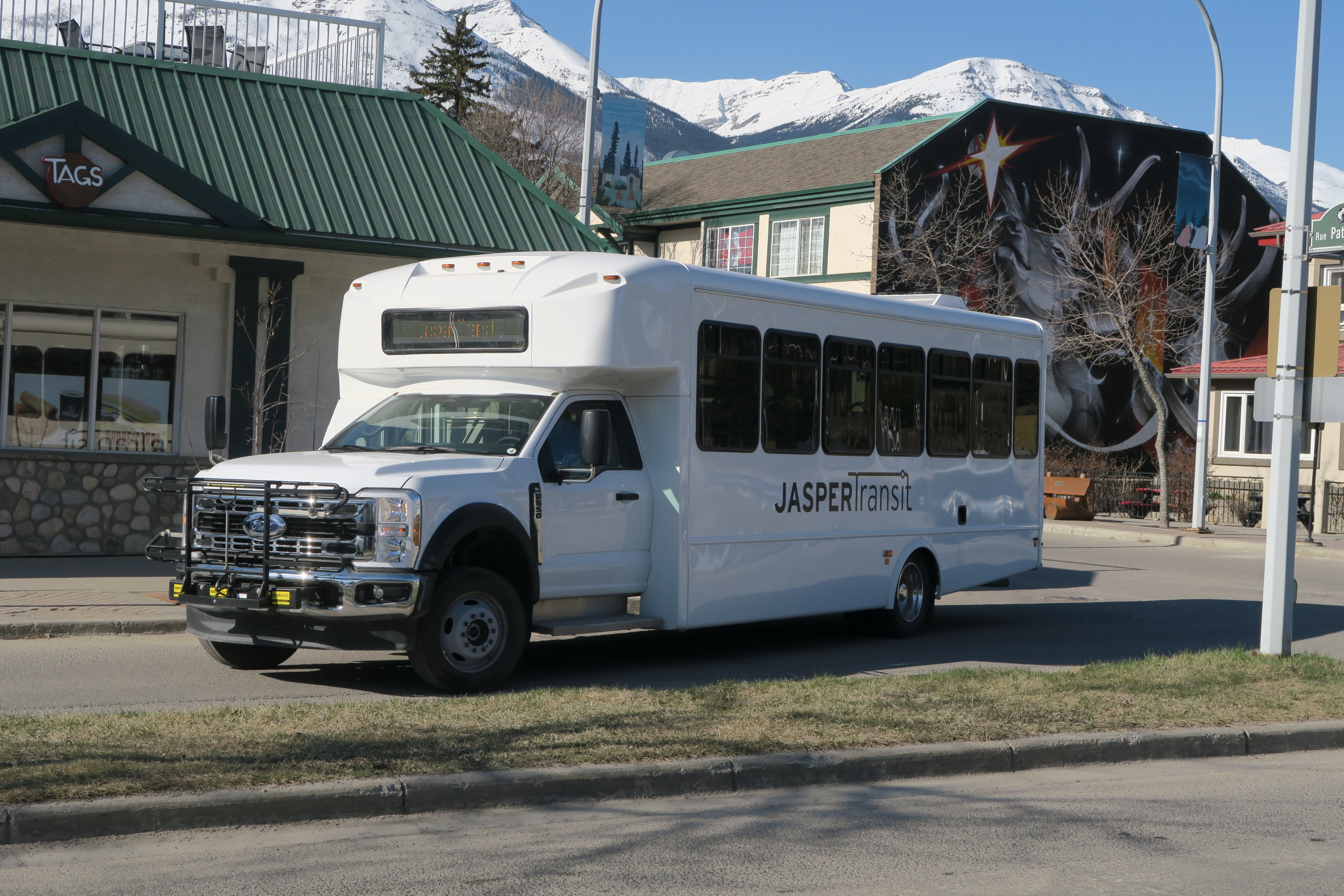
A Jasper Transit bus parked in front of the Tags Jasper convenience store, seen from Patricia Street

Jasper railway station is served by Via Rail with two passenger services. The Canadian and the Jasper–Prince Rupert train both operate three times per week. The train station is also served by Rocky Mountaineer.

Jasper Airport is located 7.2 nautical miles (13.3 km; 8.3 mi) north of Jasper.

The Municipality of Jasper operates a public transit service; Jasper Transit with three local routes and one regional route to Parks West Mall in Hinton, Alberta.

The Old Fort Point Bridge, which branches east off of Highway 93A just south of Jasper, allows vehicles to cross the Athabasca River.

== Education ==
The Grande Yellowhead Public School Division No. 77 operates two schools in Jasper: Jasper Elementary School (K–6 English & French Immersion) and Jasper Junior Senior High School (7–12 English & French Immersion), while Greater North Central Francophone Education Region No. 2 operates a francophone school called École Desrochers for kindergarten through grade 12.

== Media ==
Newspapers

- Jasper Fitzhugh (locally owned weekly)
- The Local (locally owned weekly)

Radio

| Frequency | Call sign | Branding | Format | Owner | Notes |
|---|---|---|---|---|---|
| FM 92.3 | CJAG-FM | The Lone Wolf | Active rock | Athabasca Hotel | Rebroadcaster of CFBR-FM (Edmonton) |
| FM 95.5 | CFXP-FM | New Country | Country music | Stingray Group | Rebroadcaster of CFXE-FM (Edson) |
| FM 98.1 | CBXJ-FM | CBC Radio One | Talk radio, public radio | Canadian Broadcasting Corporation | Rebroadcaster of CBX (Edmonton) |

Television

| OTA channel | Call sign | Network | Notes |
|---|---|---|---|
| 11 (VHF) | CFRN-TV-11 | CTV | Rebroadcaster of CFRN-DT (Edmonton) |

== Sister cities ==
- (Japan) Hakone, Kanagawa, since July 4, 1972

== Notable people ==
- Ian Herbers, NHL hockey player
- John Hilworth, NHL hockey player
- Erin Karpluk, actress - best known for CBC's Being Erica
- Loni Klettl, Olympic alpine skier – 1980 Lake Placid downhill
- Kirby Morrow (1973–2020), voice actor known for roles such as Miroku from InuYasha, Hot Shot from Transformers: Cybertron, and Cole from Ninjago
- Wyatt Tremblay, editorial cartoonist
- Brian Young, NHL hockey player

== See also ==
- Jasper to Banff Relay
- List of communities in Alberta
- List of francophone communities in Alberta
- List of historic places in Alberta's Rockies
- List of specialized municipalities in Alberta
