= Grande Cache =

- Hamlet
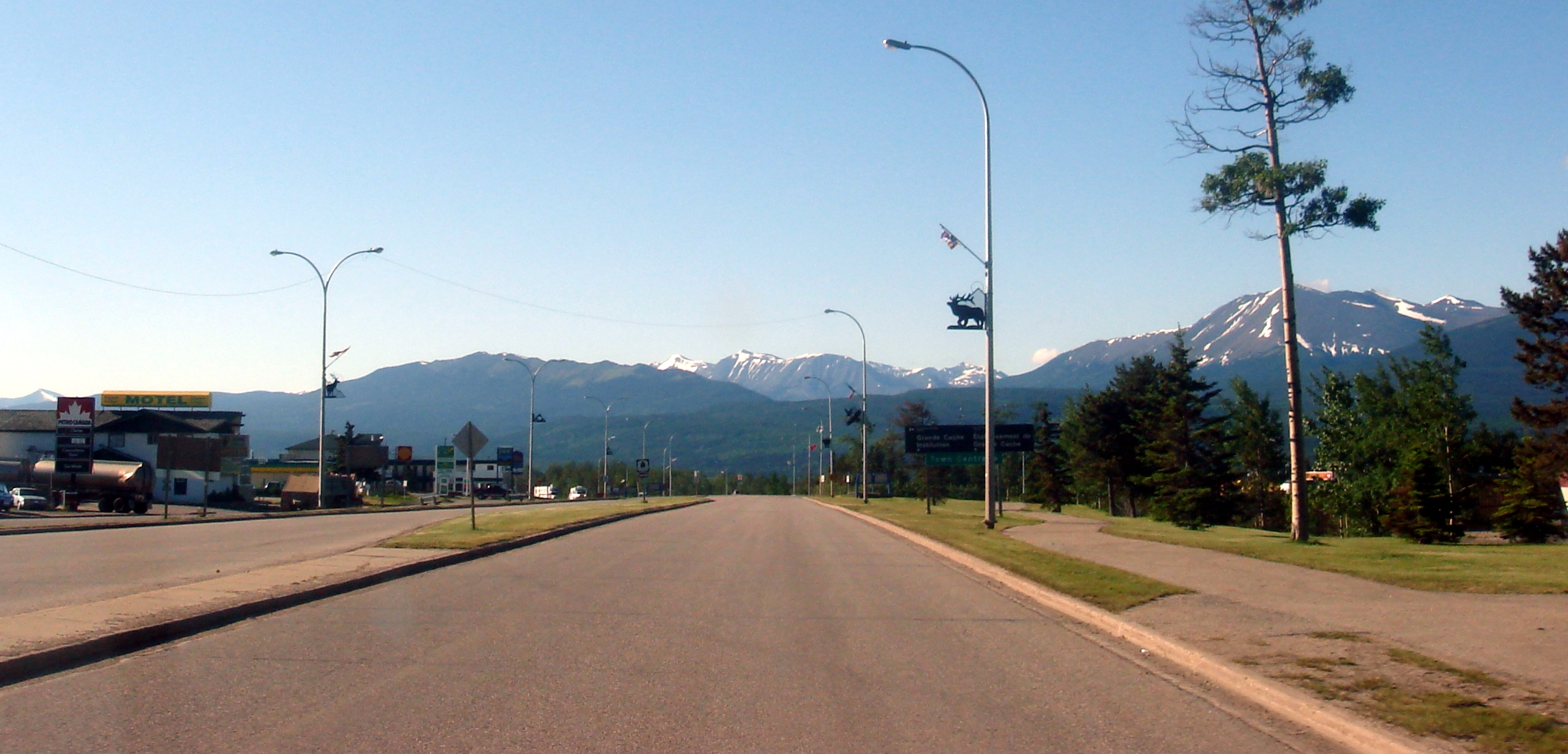
- Highway 40 through Grande Cache

- Location in M.D. of Greenview Location in Alberta Grande Cache (Canada) Grande Cache (North America)
- Coordinates: 53°53′19″N 119°07′06″W
- Country: Canada
- Province: Alberta
- Region: Northern Alberta
- Planning region: Upper Peace
- Municipal district: Greenview
- Incorporated
  - New town: September 1, 1966
  - Town: September 1, 1983
- Dissolved (Hamlet): January 1, 2019

Government
  - Governing body: Municipal District of Greenview No. 16 Council
  - MP: William Stevenson (Cons - Yellowhead)
  - MLAs: Martin Long (UCP - West Yellowhead)

Area (2021)
  - Land: 35.21 km^{2} (13.59 sq mi)
- Elevation: 1,220 m (4,000 ft)

Population (2021)
  - Total: 3,276
  - Density: 93/km^{2} (240/sq mi)
- Time zone: UTC−06:00 (Alberta Time)
- Postal code: T0E 0Y0
- Area code: +1-780
- Website: Official website

Grande Cache is a hamlet in West-Central Alberta, Canada within and administered by the Municipal District of Greenview No. 16. It is located on Highway 40 approximately 145 kilometres (90 mi) northwest of Hinton and 435 kilometres (270 mi) west of Edmonton. Grande Cache overlooks the Smoky River, is at the northern edge of Alberta's Rockies, and serves as a gateway to the Willmore Wilderness Park. The hamlet held town status prior to 2019.

== History ==
The New Town of Grande Cache was incorporated on September 1, 1966. The purpose of creating a new town was to open the area for the development of coal mines. New town status allowed the town to use the Government of Alberta as a guarantor for debt.

Construction of Grande Cache began in 1969. By 1971 a hospital, schools, stores, and the first homes were built.

Grande Cache received town status on September 1, 1983.

The community suffered a boom-bust cycle due to the dependence on a single employer that depended on a single commodity: coal. In an attempt to diversify the economy additional industries were encouraged to develop in the area. This included a wood chip plant and a federal prison operated by the Correctional Service of Canada. In recent years, wilderness tourism is an increasing industry.

Coal has been pivotal to Grande Cache's history. The British Coal Board established a large mine in 1966 to produce metallurgical coal which was used in Japanese coke ovens to provide the carbon input for steel production. Grande Cache's coal typically was not intended for power generation due to its low volatiles content. According to the NY Times in 1971: "Japanese steel makers, or their customers, are paying the relocation costs of miners who have come to Grande Cache from Nova Scotia's fading Cape Breton coal mines, from the dying wheat hamlets of Saskatchewan, from Utah and Montana mines and from South Korea, Japan, West Germany, the Netherlands and Britain."

In September 2018, Grande Cache's Town Council determined that, due to a reduction in population and the subsequent loss in tax revenue, the town was no longer financially sustainable. On September 25, 2018, town residents voted to dissolve the town into a hamlet under the jurisdiction of the Municipal District (MD) of Greenview No. 16. Out of 1,100 ballots cast in the vote, 1,065 were votes in favour of dissolution, 32 were in favour of remaining a town, and 3 ballots were rejected. The dissolution came into effect on January 1, 2019, rendering Grande Cache a hamlet in the Municipal District of Greenview No. 16.

== Geography ==
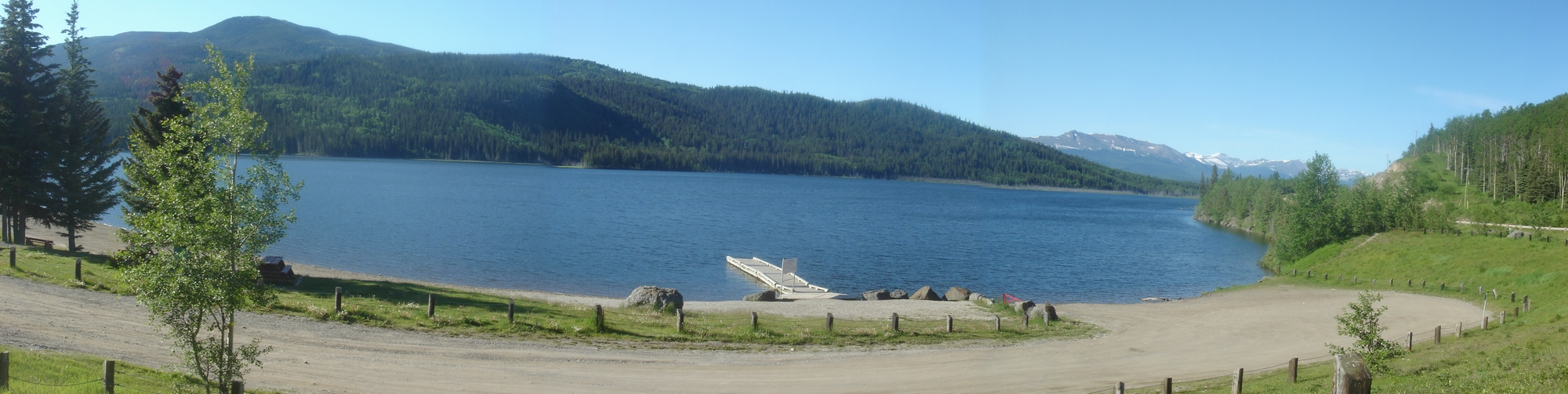
Grande Cache Lake

The hamlet is built on a plateau that is just below the subalpine level of the Rocky Mountains. The town site is surrounded by three valleys: to the north is the Smoky River; to the west is the Sulphur River; to the south is Victor Lake and Grande Cache Lake. To the east of town is Grande Mountain.

=== Climate ===
Grande Cache experiences a subarctic climate (Köppen climate classification Dfc). Summertime is usually very mild, but can also be very cool or warm depending on the movement of different airmasses in the area. Wintertime is very cold and snowy, lasting from November into March, and sometimes even later.

Climate data for Grande Cache
Month	Jan	Feb	Mar	Apr	May	Jun	Jul	Aug	Sep	Oct	Nov	Dec	Year
Record high °C (°F)	14 (57)	16 (61)	18 (64)	25 (77)	29.5 (85.1)	34.5 (94.1)	31 (88)	31 (88)	32 (90)	24 (75)	18 (64)	16 (61)	34.5 (94.1)
Mean daily maximum °C (°F)	−2.2 (28.0)	−1 (30)	2.6 (36.7)	8.5 (47.3)	13.3 (55.9)	17.1 (62.8)	19.6 (67.3)	19 (66)	14.7 (58.5)	9 (48)	0.6 (33.1)	−2.5 (27.5)	8.2 (46.8)
Daily mean °C (°F)	−7.1 (19.2)	−6.5 (20.3)	−2.9 (26.8)	2.7 (36.9)	7.3 (45.1)	11.1 (52.0)	13.3 (55.9)	12.7 (54.9)	8.9 (48.0)	4 (39)	−4.2 (24.4)	−7.5 (18.5)	2.7 (36.9)
Mean daily minimum °C (°F)	−12.1 (10.2)	−11.9 (10.6)	−8.4 (16.9)	−3.2 (26.2)	1.4 (34.5)	5 (41)	7 (45)	6.4 (43.5)	3.1 (37.6)	−1.1 (30.0)	−8.9 (16.0)	−12.5 (9.5)	−2.9 (26.8)
Record low °C (°F)	−39 (−38)	−41 (−42)	−37.8 (−36.0)	−22 (−8)	−12 (10)	−3.9 (25.0)	0.5 (32.9)	−5 (23)	−10 (14)	−30 (−22)	−43 (−45)	−41 (−42)	−43 (−45)
Average precipitation mm (inches)	24.9 (0.98)	26.6 (1.05)	30.5 (1.20)	25.6 (1.01)	57.8 (2.28)	69 (2.7)	83.2 (3.28)	70.1 (2.76)	52.5 (2.07)	34.3 (1.35)	33.6 (1.32)	31.5 (1.24)	539.6 (21.24)
Source: Environment Canada

== Demographics ==
Federal census population history
Year	Pop.	±%
1971	2,525	—
1976	4,116	+63.0%
1981	4,523	+9.9%
1986	3,646	−19.4%
1991	3,842	+5.4%
1996	4,441	+15.6%
2001	3,828	−13.8%
2006	3,783	−1.2%
2011	4,319	+14.2%
2016	3,571	−17.3%
2021	3,276	−8.3%
Source: Statistics Canada

In the 2021 Census of Population conducted by Statistics Canada, Grande Cache had a population of 3,276 living in 1,238 of its 1,533 total private dwellings, a change of −8.3% from its 2016 population of 3,571. With a land area of 35.21 km^{2} (13.59 sq mi), it had a population density of 93.0/km^{2} (241.0/sq mi) in 2021.

As a designated place in the 2016 Census of Population conducted by Statistics Canada, Grande Cache had a population of 3,571 living in 1,296 of its 1,759 total private dwellings, a −17.3% change from its 2011 population of 4,319. With a land area of 34.97 km^{2} (13.50 sq mi), it had a population density of 102.1/km^{2} (264.5/sq mi) in 2016.

== Attractions ==
- Grande Cache Recreation Centre
- Grande Cache Golf and Country Club
- Great Canadian Death Race
- Willmore Wilderness Park
- Grande Cache Tourism & Interpretive Centre
- Sulphur Gates Provincial Park
- Caw Ridge

== Sports ==
Grande Cache is the home of the Canadian Death Race.

The Grande Cache Rockies are the local hockey team in Grande Cache.

Volleyball, basketball, and badminton are offered by local schools for grade 6-9 and 10-12.

== Infrastructure ==
Grande Cache is the site of the Grande Cache Institution, a medium-security prison.

=== Transportation ===
Grande Cache is connected to Grande Prairie and Hinton via Highway 40. There is a Community Bus that provides transportation to both Grande Prairie and Hinton weekly. Additionally, the Community Bus provides transportation to the Cooperatives and Enterprises and local community businesses weekly. Grande Cache Airport is 24 km (15 mi) outside of town. There are no scheduled flights into Grande Cache Airport. The airport closed as of January 2017.

=== Electrical ===
H.R. Milner harbours a 300 megawatt combined cycle gas turbine(Milner 2) near Grande Cache.

Grande Cache uses almost entirely underground electrical distribution. Power is supplied to the hamlet by ATCO. This is distributed to individual transformers at typically 14.4kV. Three phase electricity is distributed to some buildings.

== Education ==
Local schools in Grande Cache include:

- Sheldon Coates Elementary School (K-3);
- Summitview School (grades 4-8);
- SonRise Christian School (K-6) (Closed in 22/23 year);
- Grande Cache Community High School (grades 9-12);

== Notable people ==
- Dean McAmmond, professional hockey player
- Travis Roche, professional hockey player

== See also ==
- List of communities in Alberta
- List of former urban municipalities in Alberta
- List of hamlets in Alberta
