= Edson, Alberta =

Town in Canadian Province of Alberta

Edson
- Town
- Town of Edson
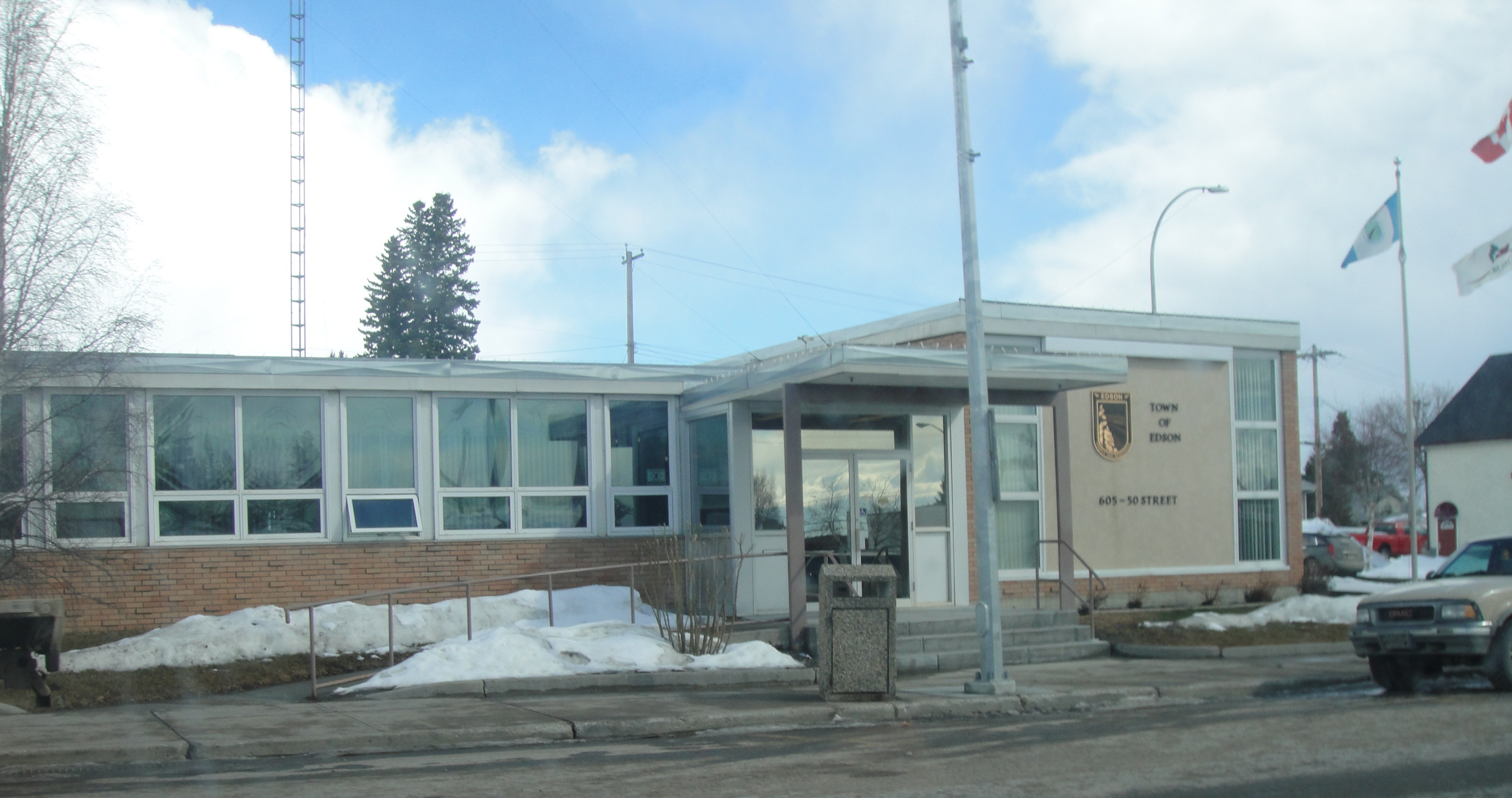
- Edson town hall

- Coat of arms
- Motto: Heart of the Yellowhead
- Location in Yellowhead County

- Location of Edson in Alberta Edson (Canada) Edson (North America)
- Coordinates: 53°34′54″N 116°26′04″W
- Country: Canada
- Province: Alberta
- Planning region: Upper Athabasca
- Municipal district: Yellowhead County
- Incorporated
  - Village: 9 January 1911
  - Town: 21 September 1911
- Founder: Grand Trunk Pacific Railway
- Named for: Edson Joseph Chamberlin

Government
  - Mayor: Kevin Zahara
  - Governing body: Edson Town Council: Pat Fogarty; Shawn Holden; Greg Pasychny; Al Schram; Peter Taylor; Corrie Wilson-Leier
  - Manager: Christine Beveridge
  - MP: William Stevenson (Cons – Yellowhead)
  - MLA: Martin Long (United Conservative Party – West Yellowhead)

Area (2021)
  - Land: 29.43 km^{2} (11.36 sq mi)
- Elevation: 920 m (3,020 ft)

Population (2021)
  - Total: 8,374
  - Density: 284.5/km^{2} (737/sq mi)
- Demonym: Edsonite
- Time zone: UTC−06:00 (Alberta Time)
- Forward sortation area: T7E
- Area code: +1-780
- Website: edson.ca

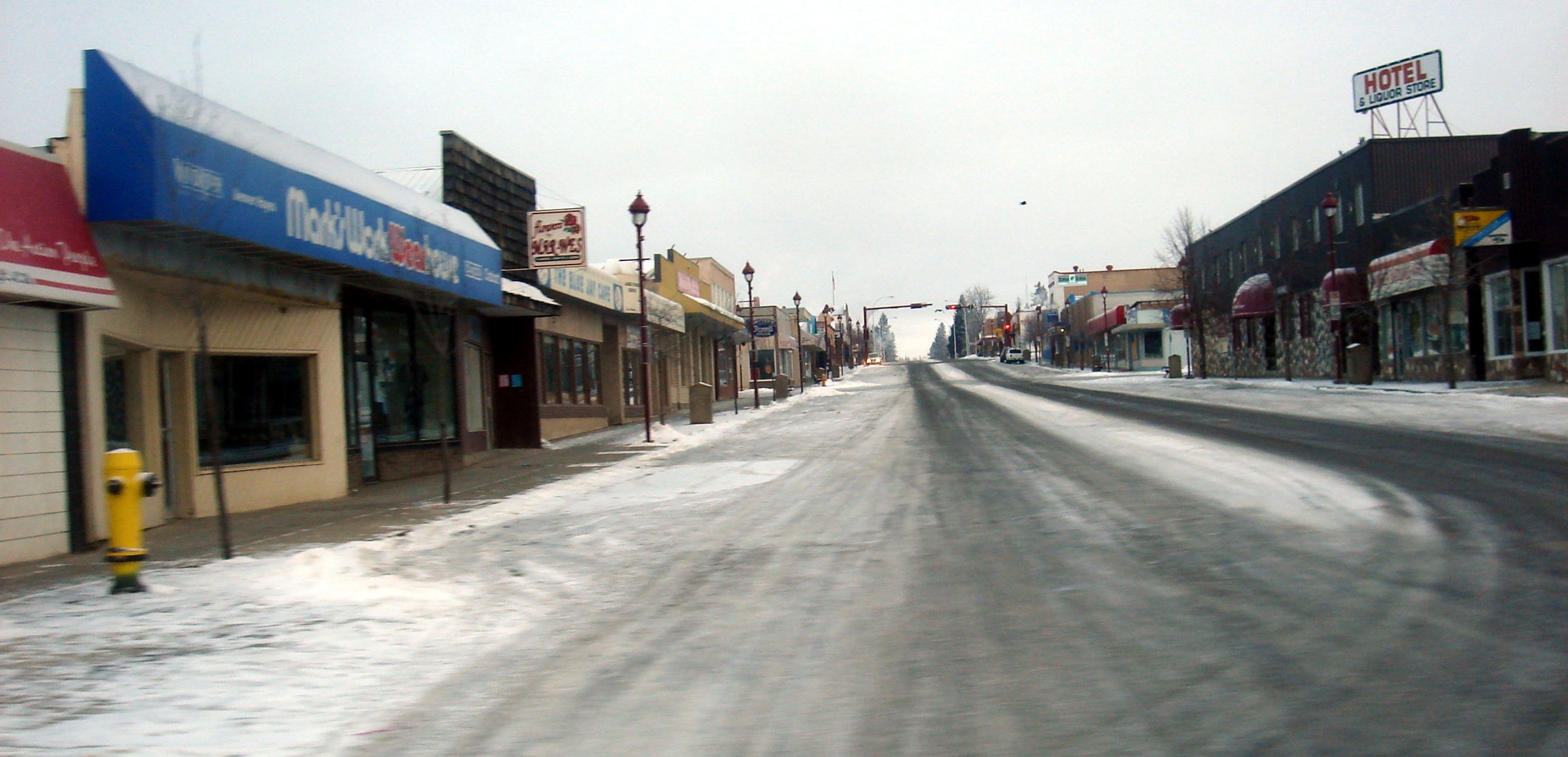
Downtown Edson (50th Street)

Edson is a town in west-central Alberta, Canada. It is located in Yellowhead County, 192 kilometres (119 mi) west of Edmonton along the Yellowhead Highway and 10 kilometres (6.2 mi) east of the intersection with Highway 47.

== History ==
The town was founded as Heatherwood, but the name was changed around 1911 in honour of Edson Joseph Chamberlin, vice-president of the Grand Trunk Pacific Railway. When Edson was declared the local rail centre, smaller communities such as Rosevear (abandoned), Wolf Creek, Carrot Creek and Niton Junction fell into a decline that continues today. In the 1950s, upgrading of Highway 16 caused a dramatic increase in private, commercial and industrial traffic. Today, the Yellowhead Highway carries some of the heaviest traffic flow in Alberta and has been declared the second Trans-Canada Highway. In the 1970s, a revitalized coal industry launched the Cardinal River Coal and Luscar Sterco mines in the area. In the 1980s Pelican Spruce Mills (now Weyerhaeuser Company Limited) and Sundance Forest Industries (now Edson Forest Products a division of West Fraser Timber) became two of Edson's major employers. The former hamlets of Glenwood and Grande Prairie Trail were annexed from Yellowhead County by the Town of Edson on 1 January 1984. In 2023, Edson was evacuated twice due to wildfires and later declared a local state of emergency due to floods.

== Demographics ==
Population history
| Year | Pop. | ±% |
|---|---|---|
| 1996 | 7,399 | — |
| 2001 | 7,585 | +2.5% |
| 2006 | 8,098 | +6.8% |
| 2011 | 8,475 | +4.7% |
| 2016 | 8,414 | −0.7% |
Source: Statistics Canada

In the 2021 Census of Population conducted by Statistics Canada, the Town of Edson had a population of 8,374 living in 3,386 of its 3,768 total private dwellings, a change of −0.5% from its 2016 population of 8,414. With a land area of 29.43 km^{2} (11.36 sq mi), it had a population density of 284.5/km^{2} (737.0/sq mi) in 2021.

In the 2016 Census of Population conducted by Statistics Canada, the Town of Edson recorded a population of 8,414 living in 3,359 of its 3,762 total private dwellings, a −0.7% change from its 2011 population of 8,475. With a land area of 29.72 km^{2} (11.47 sq mi), it had a population density of 283.1/km^{2} (733.2/sq mi) in 2016.

The Town of Edson's 2012 municipal census counted a population of 8,646.

== Geography ==
Edson lies in the McLeod River valley, immediately east of the Canadian Rockies foothills. The surrounding landscape consists of primarily taiga forest with sand hills and muskeg. The town is located at an altitude of 925 metres (3,035 ft). Two provincial parks are located west of Edson: Sundance Provincial Park along Sundance Creek and Obed Lake Provincial Park surrounding the three Obed Lakes.

=== Climate ===
Due to Edson's high elevation, the community experiences a subarctic climate (Köppen climate classification Dfc). The highest temperature ever recorded in Edson was 38.9 °C (102 °F) on 30 June 2021, with the humidex reaching 41. The coldest temperature ever recorded was −48.3 °C (−55 °F) on 22 January 1943, and 14 January 1950. Summers in Edson are generally mild to warm with chilly nights and moderate precipitation. Winters are long and severely cold with relatively high snowfall, higher than surrounding areas due to the town's high elevation.

Climate data for Edson Airport, 1971–2000 normals, extremes 1914–present
| Month | Jan | Feb | Mar | Apr | May | Jun | Jul | Aug | Sep | Oct | Nov | Dec | Year |
|---|---|---|---|---|---|---|---|---|---|---|---|---|---|
| Record high °C (°F) | 15.6 (60.1) | 19.4 (66.9) | 22.2 (72.0) | 30.0 (86.0) | 33.3 (91.9) | 38.9 (102.0) | 37.2 (99.0) | 33.4 (92.1) | 33.0 (91.4) | 28.9 (84.0) | 20.6 (69.1) | 16.7 (62.1) | 38.9 (102.0) |
| Mean daily maximum °C (°F) | −5.2 (22.6) | −2.2 (28.0) | 3.6 (38.5) | 10.6 (51.1) | 16.2 (61.2) | 19.4 (66.9) | 21.6 (70.9) | 20.6 (69.1) | 15.7 (60.3) | 10.3 (50.5) | 0.1 (32.2) | −5 (23) | 8.8 (47.8) |
| Daily mean °C (°F) | −11.8 (10.8) | −9.2 (15.4) | −3.3 (26.1) | 3.5 (38.3) | 8.9 (48.0) | 12.6 (54.7) | 14.6 (58.3) | 13.7 (56.7) | 8.8 (47.8) | 3.4 (38.1) | −6 (21) | −11.2 (11.8) | 2.0 (35.6) |
| Mean daily minimum °C (°F) | −18.2 (−0.8) | −16.1 (3.0) | −10.2 (13.6) | −3.7 (25.3) | 1.4 (34.5) | 5.7 (42.3) | 7.6 (45.7) | 6.8 (44.2) | 1.8 (35.2) | −3.5 (25.7) | −12.1 (10.2) | −17.5 (0.5) | −4.8 (23.4) |
| Record low °C (°F) | −48.3 (−54.9) | −47.3 (−53.1) | −41.1 (−42.0) | −34.4 (−29.9) | −13.3 (8.1) | −6.7 (19.9) | −3.9 (25.0) | −3.9 (25.0) | −18.3 (−0.9) | −34.6 (−30.3) | −39.2 (−38.6) | −47.8 (−54.0) | −48.3 (−54.9) |
| Average precipitation mm (inches) | 26.4 (1.04) | 14.2 (0.56) | 20.0 (0.79) | 23.6 (0.93) | 57.9 (2.28) | 106.7 (4.20) | 106.2 (4.18) | 82.2 (3.24) | 62.6 (2.46) | 23.2 (0.91) | 18.5 (0.73) | 20.9 (0.82) | 562.4 (22.14) |
| Average rainfall mm (inches) | 1.4 (0.06) | 0.5 (0.02) | 3.0 (0.12) | 12.9 (0.51) | 52.2 (2.06) | 106.7 (4.20) | 106.2 (4.18) | 82.2 (3.24) | 56.7 (2.23) | 11.4 (0.45) | 2.5 (0.10) | 0.7 (0.03) | 436.3 (17.18) |
| Average snowfall cm (inches) | 35.8 (14.1) | 22.3 (8.8) | 25.8 (10.2) | 13.8 (5.4) | 6.4 (2.5) | 0.0 (0.0) | 0.0 (0.0) | 0.1 (0.0) | 6.7 (2.6) | 13.4 (5.3) | 22.3 (8.8) | 30.0 (11.8) | 176.5 (69.5) |
| Mean monthly sunshine hours | 84.5 | 112.1 | 155.3 | 210.2 | 243.2 | 251.5 | 278.1 | 245.8 | 169.2 | 148.0 | 95.1 | 73.7 | 2,066.8 |
| Percentage possible sunshine | 33.7 | 40.6 | 42.3 | 50.1 | 49.4 | 49.5 | 54.4 | 53.6 | 44.3 | 45.0 | 36.6 | 31.4 | 44.2 |
Source: Environment Canada

== Economy ==
The main industries that drive the local economy are resource based – coal, oil, natural gas and forestry products.

== Sports ==
Edson was home to Canada's largest slo-pitch tournament until 2017.

== Culture ==
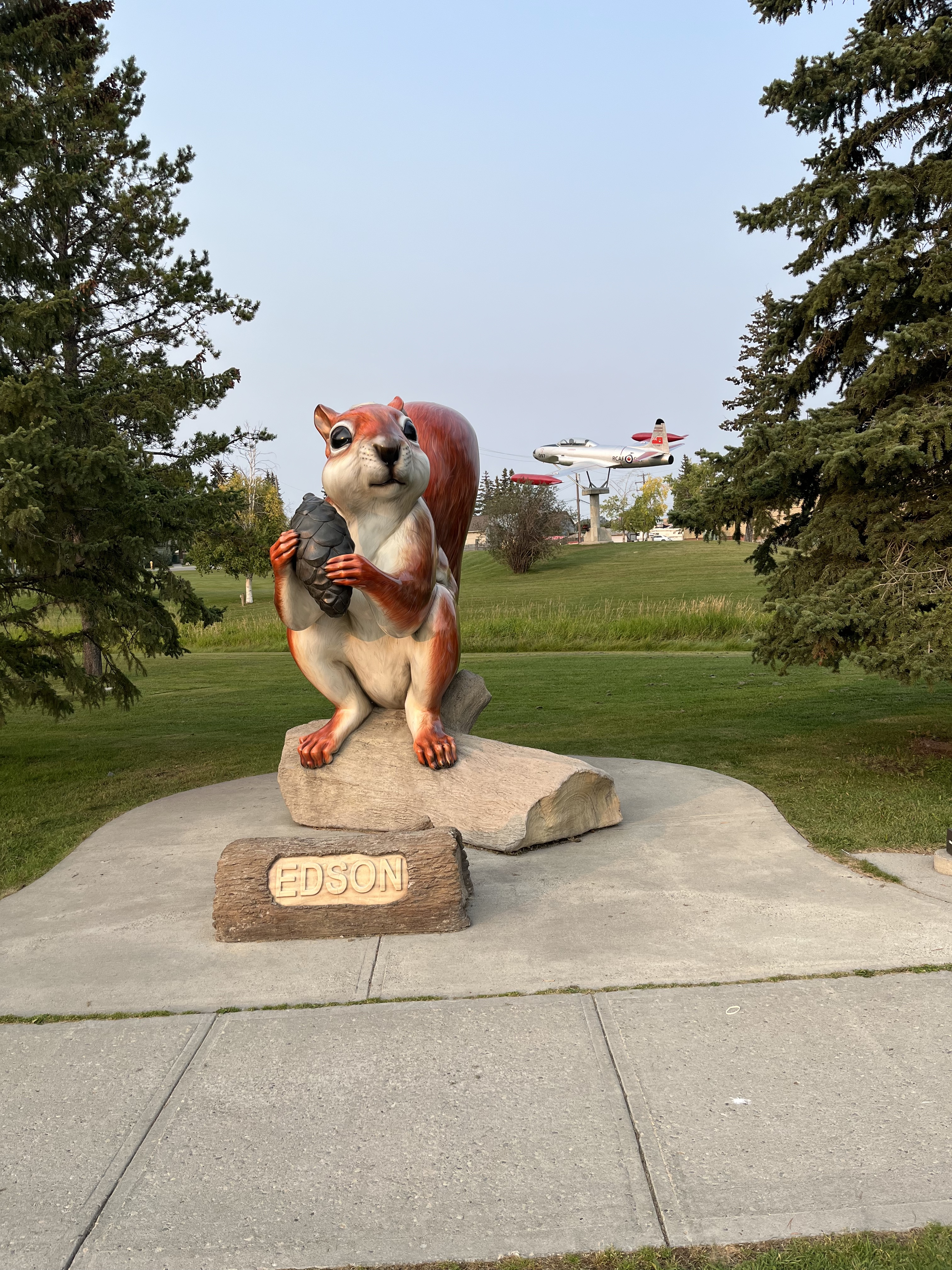
Eddie the Squirrel with the Silver Star in the background.

The Galloway Station Museum, established in 1981, explores the history of Edson and the surrounding area. It contains an original Canadian Northern Railway station used by several communities around Edson as well as large modern gallery spaces, an archives and public events space. The museum is located in RCMP Centennial Park, a large park at the centre of town created in 1974 to honour the 100th anniversary of the Royal Canadian Mounted Police in Alberta. The park, run by the Town of Edson, also contains an event pavilion, a Canadian National Railway caboose, a preserved RCAF Lockheed T-33 Silver Star aircraft, and giant squirrel statue that depicts the town's mascot, "Eddie the Squirrel".

== Infrastructure ==
Edson is connected to the Yellowhead Highway from east to west and to Coal Valley via Highway 47 to the south.

Via Rail's The Canadian calls at the Edson railway station twice per week in each direction as a flag stop.

== Education ==
Grande Yellowhead Public School Division No. 77

- Mary Bergeron Elementary School (K-5)
- Parkland Composite High School (9-12 English, French)
- École Pine Grove Middle School (6-8 English, French)
- Westhaven Elementary School (K-5 English, French)

Living Waters Catholic Regional Division No. 42

- Holy Redeemer Junior Senior Catholic High School (7–12)
- Vanier Community Catholic School (K-6)

Private

- Yellowhead Koinonia Christian School (K-12)

== Media ==
Newspapers

Edson has one weekly paper, The Weekly Anchor, published every Monday. A second paper, Edson Leader, was established in 1911 before ceasing publication in 2020.

Radio stations

- CBXD 1540 CBC Radio One
- CFXE 94.3 Newcap Broadcasting
- CKUA-FM-8 103.7 CKUA Radio Network

== Coat of arms ==
On 15 October 2019, the town was granted a coat of arms by the Canadian Heraldic Authority, while the announcement of the Letters Patent was made on 28 March 2020, in Volume 154, page 692 of the Canada Gazette.

Coat of arms of Edson, Alberta

Granted
15 October 2019
Crest
A great grey owl Azure issuant from a mural crown Argent set with gouttes de poix and flames Azure.
Escutcheon
Per fess Azure and Argent a fess bretessé counterchanged between in chief two lozenges Argent each charged with a pine tree Vert and in base a lozenge Sable.
Supporters
Two red squirrels each holding a pinecone and sejant on a log proper

== Notable people ==
- George VanderBurg, Canadian politician, Progressive Conservative MLA (2001–2013)

== See also ==
- Edson Airport
- List of communities in Alberta
- List of towns in Alberta
