= Hinton, Alberta =

Town in Alberta, Canada

Hinton
- Town
- Town of Hinton
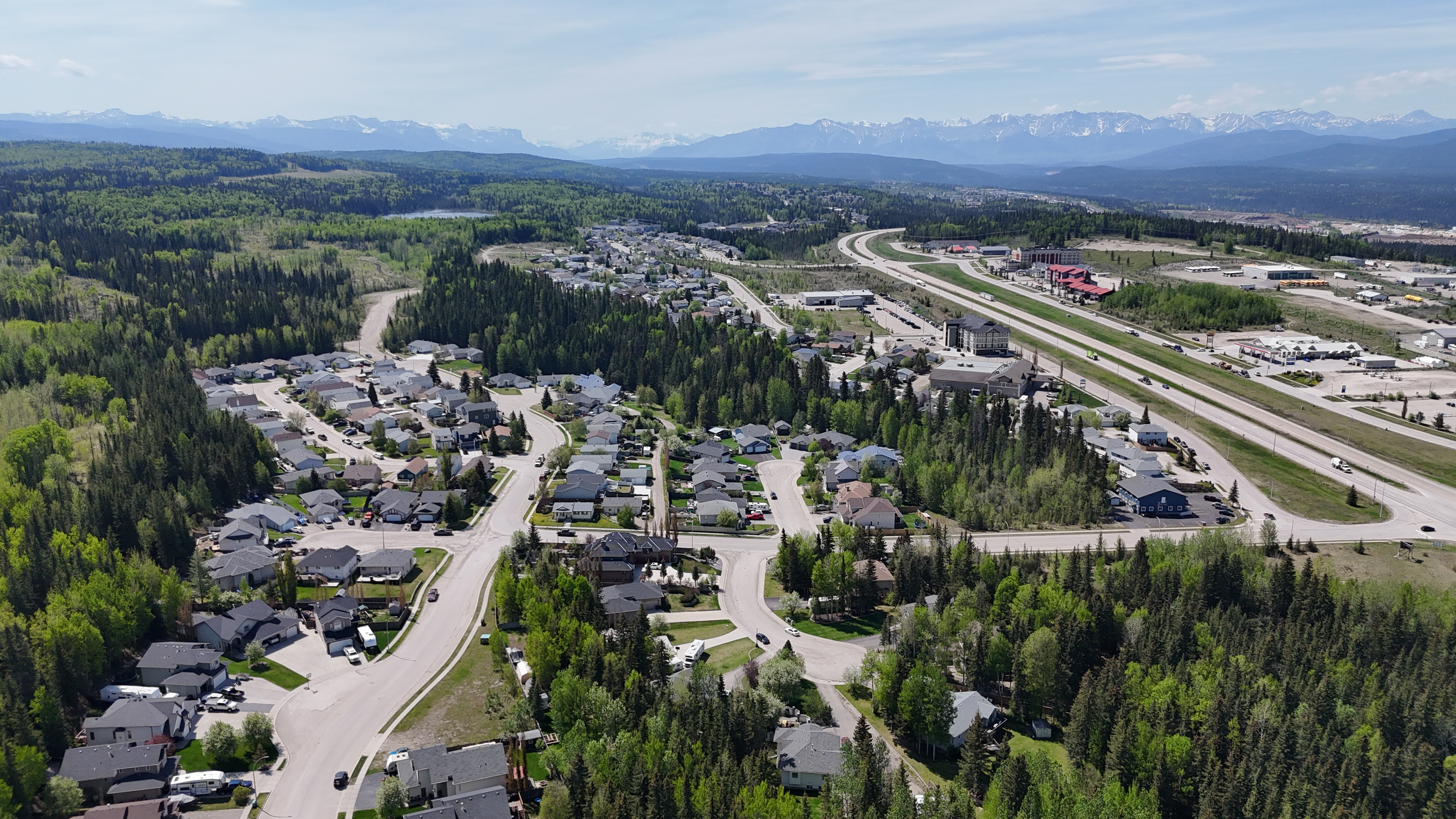
- Hinton (hill district)

- Motto: Gateway to the Rockies
- Location in Yellowhead County

- Location of Hinton in Alberta Hinton (Canada) Hinton (North America)
- Coordinates: 53°24′40″N 117°33′46″W
- Country: Canada
- Province: Alberta
- Planning region: Upper Athabasca
- Municipal district: Yellowhead County
- Founded: 1928
- Incorporated
  - New town: 1 November 1956
  - Town: 29 December 1958
- Amalgamated: 1 April 1957

Government
  - Mayor: Brian LaBerge
  - Governing body: Hinton Town Council: Kristen Chambers; Natalie Charlton; Gail Dunn; Donald MacLean; William McDonald; Dewly Nelson
  - Manager: Jordan Panasiuk
  - MP: William Stevenson (CPC - Yellowhead)
  - MLA: Martin Long (UCP - West Yellowhead)

Area (2021)
  - Land: 33.32 km^{2} (12.86 sq mi)
- Elevation: 990 m (3,250 ft)

Population (2021)
  - Total: 9,817
  - Density: 294.6/km^{2} (763/sq mi)
  - Estimate (2022): 10,087
- Time zone: UTC−06:00 (Alberta Time)
- Forward sortation area: T7V
- Area codes: 780 / 587
- Highways: Highway 16 (TCH)Yellowhead Highway; Highway 40
- Website: Official website

Hinton is a town in the foothills of Alberta, Canada, with a population of 9,817. It is in Yellowhead County, 81 km (50 mi) northeast of Jasper and about 284 km (176 mi) west of Alberta's capital city, Edmonton, at the intersection of the Yellowhead and Bighorn Highways. Situated on the south bank of the Athabasca River, Hinton is on Treaty 6 territory.

The Town of Hinton is named after its railway station, which in turn was named after William Hinton, a manager for the Grand Trunk Pacific Railway at the time it was built, in 1911. The area has been on Indigenous travel routes for thousands of years, and a fur trade route beginning in 1810. Its first homesteads were established at the end of the 19th Century. Aside from a coal boom in the 1930s, the population around the Hinton station remained low until 1956 when Northwest Pulp and Power built a pulp mill. The new town, with a population over 3,500, was incorporated in 1958.

== History ==
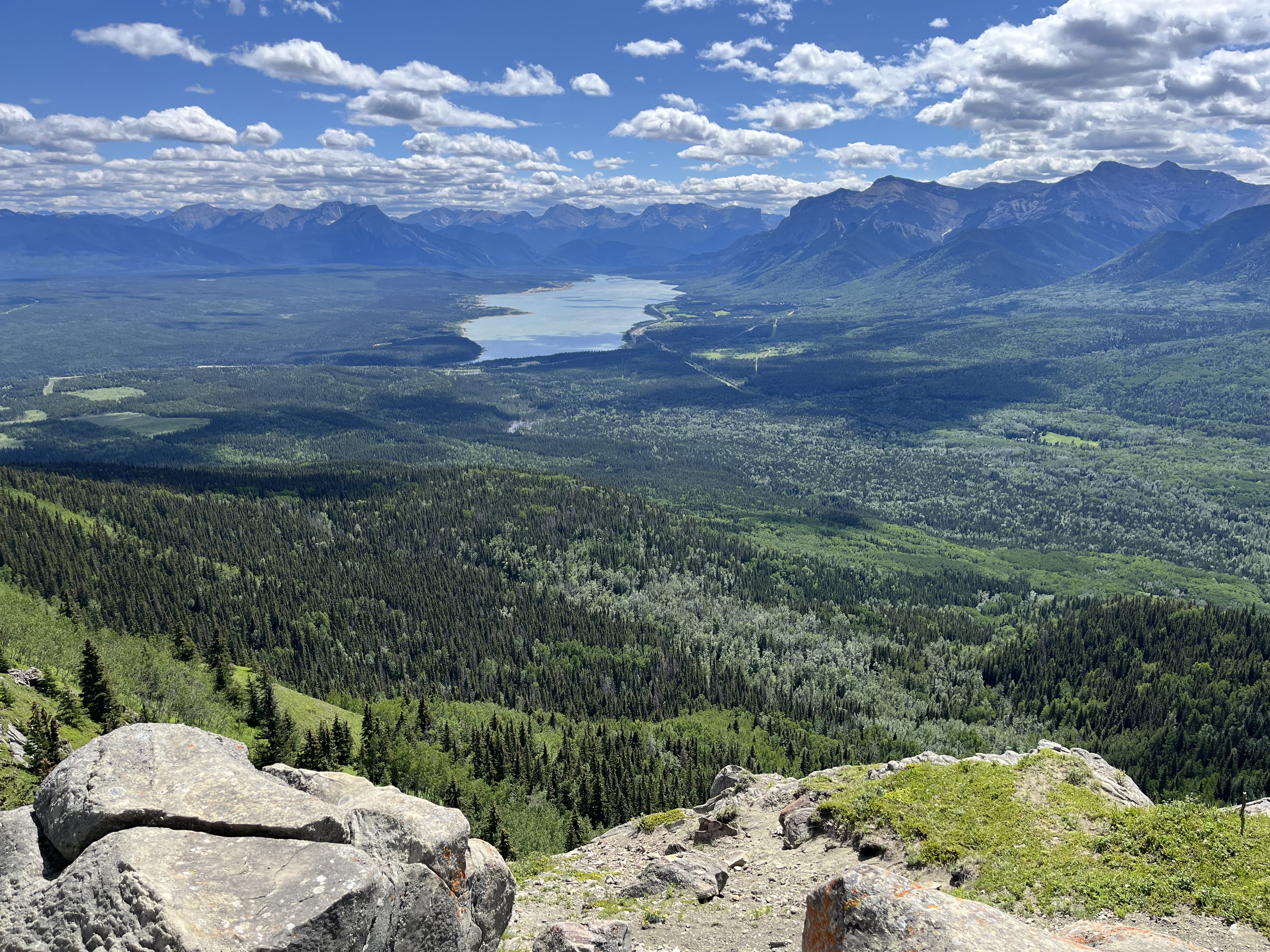
The Athabasca River Valley and Brûlé Lake just west of Hinton

=== Early habitation ===
The area around present day Hinton deglaciated 12,800–11,600 BCE. Archeological sites up the Athabasca River from Hinton show repeated habitation from 8,000 BCE until approximately 1500 AD. Other sites around Hinton demonstrate that the foothills were also an important travel and trade corridor for Indigenous peoples for thousands of years prior to European contact, dating to at least 7,000 BCE.

Before Europeans arrived in North America, the upper Athabasca region was relatively sparsely inhabited by groups speaking Athabascan/Dene languages (including the Tsuut'ina, Tsa'tinne, and Tse'khene), Siouan languages (specifically Nakoda) and, potentially, Salish languages (such as Secwepemctsín, now present west of the Rockies). European settlement in eastern Canada resulted in waves of western migration of Indigenous groups in the 18th and 19th centuries including Algonquian language-speaking groups (in particular Woodland Cree and Salteaux), Iroquoian speakers, and Métis.

Around the start of the 19th century, furs supplied by these groups, and a desire to access the Columbia River, encouraged the Hudson's Bay Company and North West Company to establish trade and supply posts in the vicinity of the Divide. David Thompson's guide Thomas the Iroquois led a brigade over Athabasca Pass, establishing the York Factory Express. Company employees would continue to pass through the area on the Athabasca River for the next half century, primarily to transport correspondence and move personnel between districts. The Jasper House post also collected furs traded by the local Indigenous people.

This population, estimated to be about 200 in 1836, was a cultural mix of Iroquois, Cree, Dane-zaa, and Métis. Present-day Hinton was within the area that they hunted, travelled, and camped: the Miette-Athabasca confluence to the west, the upper Smoky River to the north, and Lac Ste. Anne to the east. Cache Percotte Creek, just east of present-day Hinton may have been named after a camp of smallpox sufferers travelling to Lac Ste. Anne during the 1870 epidemic. (A 19th century French Canadian word for smallpox was picotte.)

In 1888, Jack Gregg established a trading post at Prairie/Maskuta Creek (from maskotêw: Plains Cree for prairie), 3 kilometres (1.9 mi) southwest of present day Hinton, to serve travellers on the overland route between Edmonton and Jasper. In 1894 he started a homestead in the same area.

Jasper Forest Park (renamed Jasper National Park in 1930) was established in 1907; in 1909, the government bought out and evicted Métis homesteaders. Among those removed from the new park was the family of John Moberly. They were given $1,000 and a quarter section next to their cousins, the Greggs' homestead. They and a handful of others homesteaded around present-day Hinton ranching, hunting, trapping, and guiding.

=== Railroads ===
The construction of the Grand Trunk Pacific Railway (GTPR) saw the establishment of a construction camp at the mouth of Prairie Creek at the Athabasca River in 1908. A 245-metre (804 ft) steel trestle bridge was built over the creek and is still in use by the Canadian National Railway today. In 1911, the GTPR built a station house at mile 978 west of Winnipeg. The station was named after William Hinton, a Vice President and General Manager for the GTPR. Mary Schäffer, on her 1911 government-sponsored trip to Maligne Lake, arrived at the end of the line in Hinton in June. The Prairie Creek construction camp was just about to break up and relocate to Moose Lake to support the next stage of construction from Hinton to Tête Jaune Cache. Schäffer wrote that they were glad to leave the, "rubbishy little town to finish its pathetic history."

The Canadian Northern Railway (CNoR) established a parallel line between Edmonton and Tête Jaune Cache. The CNoR ran just north of the GTPR line at Hinton, establishing the stations of Dalehurst (18 kilometres (11 mi) northeast of Hinton Station), Bliss (3 kilometres (1.9 mi) northeast of Hinton Station), and Dyke (now Entrance; 6 kilometres (3.7 mi) southwest of Hinton Station). In 1917 when the heavier gauge GTP rail was dismantled and sent to Europe for the war effort, trains used the CNoR line and Dalehurst became the postal station for the Hinton area; Dyke served as its communications centre.

The Canadian National Railway became the owner of both the CNoR and GTPR, and various portions of both lines were used by the new railway. In 1927, the company moved the track back to the better-constructed GTPR grade between Obed and Entrance, and the Hinton station reopened.

=== Coal boom and bust ===
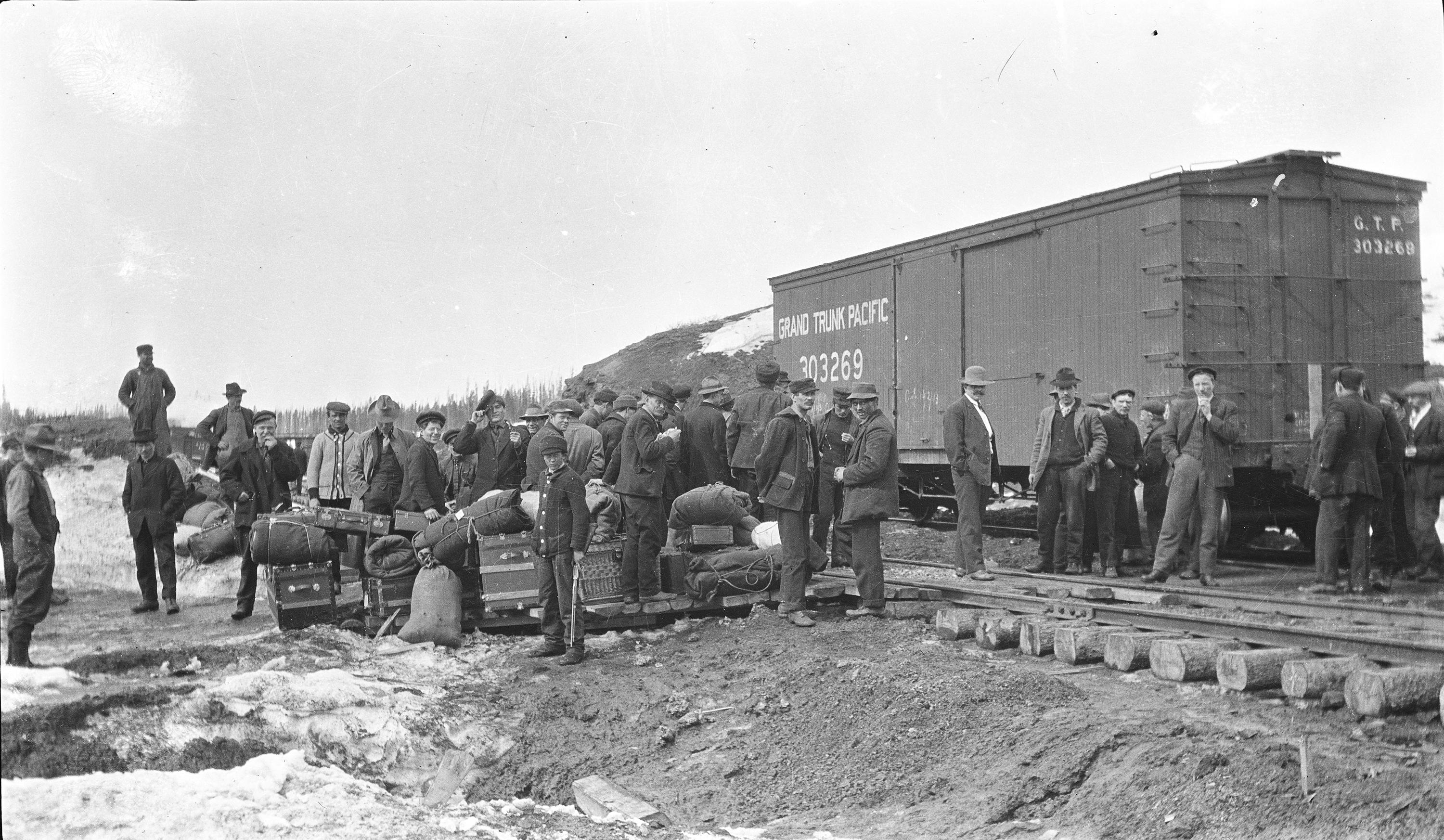
Railway station on the coal branch south of Hinton

The coal-fired steam engines of the railroads both opened access to, and provided a market for, coal from a thick seam underlying the Hinton area. The Coal Branch was completed in 1912 and created work camps such as Mountain Park, Cadomin, Luscar, Robb, Mercoal, and Coalspur, which grew into communities with populations in the hundreds, surpassing Hinton's. By the late 1920s, the region contributed 22% of Alberta's total coal production.

Closer to the Hinton station, prospectors had explored coal indications at the mouths of Happy and Prairie (Maskuta) Creeks, but as late as 1925 they were not considered practical to exploit. However, by 1928, Jasper Collieries Ltd. operated the Drinnan coal mine on the eastern end of present-day Hinton. Named after R. G. Drinnan, who discovered coal during a 1910 expedition to the area, it produced nearly 2 million tons of coal before closing in 1940. Another, smaller mine opened a short distance southwest in 1943.

On the west side of Hinton, Frank Seabolt, R. W. Jones, and Harry King opened the Hinton Collieries near Happy Creek in 1931. Seabolt had been prospecting in the area for some time while he worked supplying timber to the Mountain Park mine. He also served as the Drinnan postmaster, and in 1916 he bought Jack Gregg's ranch (and renamed it the Bar F Ranch). Seabolt, King, and Jones built and operated all the major businesses in the hamlet of Hinton in the 1930s.

The Hinton Collieries operated for about 10 years despite the Great Depression, which temporarily reduced demand for coal. At 4:30 pm on 30 March 1938 an explosion in the Hinton Collieries killed five miners and wounded five more. The mine's manager L. G. Chavignaud was found to have breached several provisions of the Alberta Mines Act and fined a total of $200. In 1940, Chavignaud's hiring as fire boss at the Mountain Park mine sparked a 3-week strike. On 22 January 1940, another miner was killed, and five injured by a runaway mine car. The Hinton Collieries were abandoned in 1941 and reported flooded in 1944.

Without the Hinton mines, a significant portion of the population left to find work elsewhere. Those that remained relied on forestry, trapping, outfitting, and some oil and gas exploration during the war years. The coal branch communities to the south continued producing through the 1940s. However, as the railways switched from coal to diesel locomotives, these mines too began closing, beginning with Mountain Park in 1950 and ending with Luscar in 1956.

=== Getting a pulp mill ===
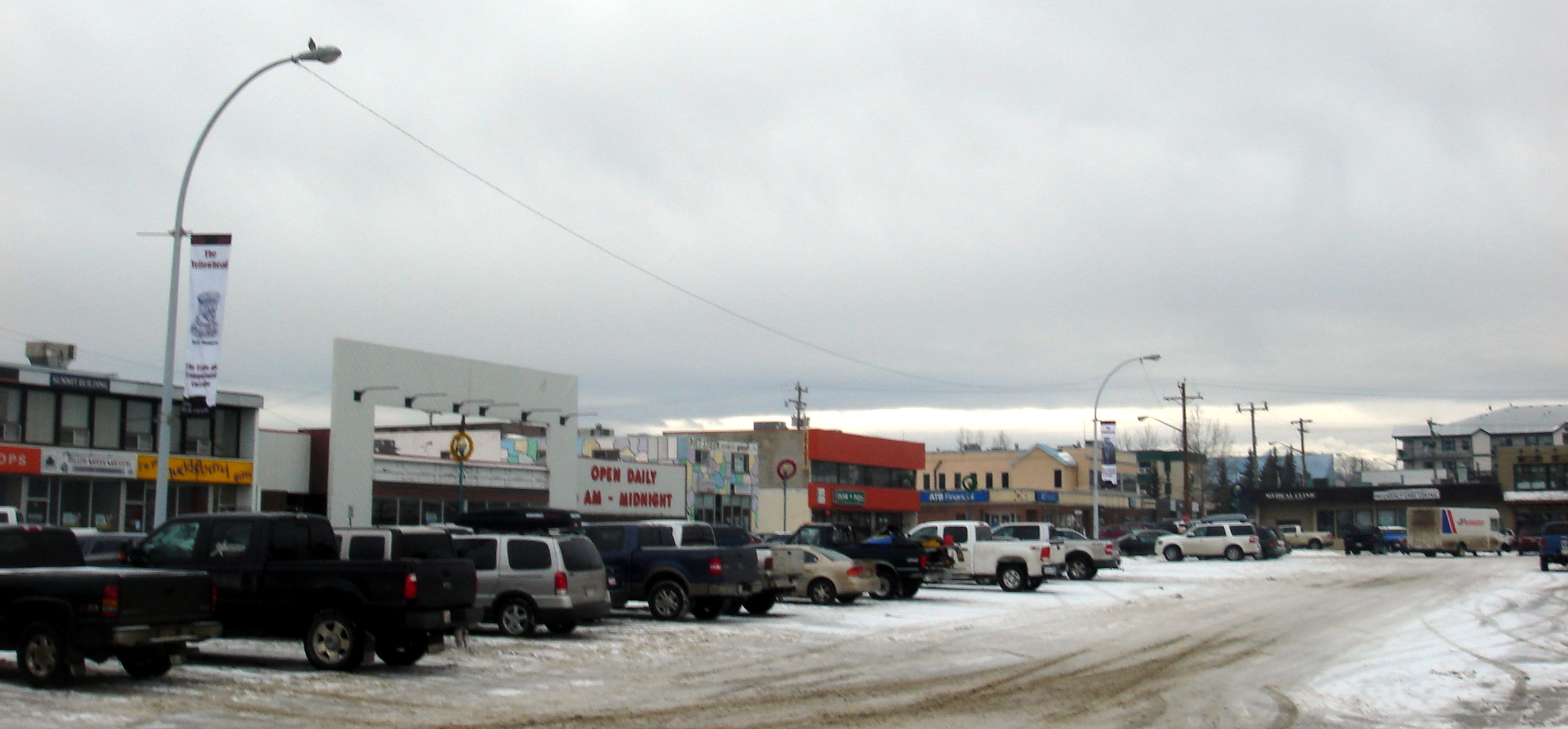
Downtown Hinton

Frank E. Ruben, the president of Northern Canadian Oil, had the idea of using the uneconomic coal and abundant nearby timber to produce Kraft pulp. Northern Canadian Oil purchased the Bryan Mountain Coal Company on the Coal Branch near Robb. The company had also formed a subsidiary called Northwest Pulp and Power, which, on 8 June 1951, entered into an agreement with the Government of Alberta. The province agreed to lease up to 2,000 square miles (5,200 km^{2}) of timber rights in the vicinity of Yates, just east of Edson, on condition that the company begin construction of a $3.5-million pulp mill near Yates by May 1952, and finish it by May 1954. Northwest Pulp and Power defaulted on the agreement.

In April 1954, Ruben returned with business partners from New York-based St. Regis Paper to revive the plan for an Edson area pulp mill. St. Regis and Northwest Pulp and Power would each put up $5 million and finance an additional $20 million estimated to be required for the mill. Each company would own 50% of the venture, with Ruben Chairman of the Board and Roy K. Ferguson of St. Regis the president. On 1 September 1954, North Western Pulp and Power entered into a new agreement with the province to construct a pulp mill on the McLeod River in the Edson area. The updated terms now included reserving 3,000 square miles (7,800 km^{2}) of pulpwood in exchange for completion of a $15-million mill by 1957 and expansion by 1962. The company then announced it had purchased a site for the mill and would begin construction the following spring.

However, in early 1955, Ruben announced a pause on the project pending the results of certain tests. In fact, the company had discovered that they would not have sufficient water for the mill's effluent at the planned Edson location. That March, Northwest Pulp and Power announced that it would instead build the mill near Hinton, where the larger Athabasca River would provide ample water. The agreement with St. Regis was that Reuben’s Northern Canadian Oil would supply the power, but St. Regis, which was in charge of designing and operating the mill, insisted that the power source be changed from coal to gas, pointing out that coal’s combustion products risked spoiling the bleached pulp. Northern Canadian Oil had to construct a new 219-kilometre (136 mi) pipeline from Wabamun to Hinton at a cost of $5 million. The recently-purchased Bryan Mountain Coal Company, whose 250 employees had been out of work pending construction of the mill's power plant, never reopened.

Work on the mill and pipeline began in the spring of 1955, and in September, the agreement with the province was officially amended to reflect the new location and costs, which had risen to at least $28.5 million. The mill was completed in April 1957, with the first pulp produced on 29 May. It became Alberta's first pulp mill. By 1959, Northwest Pulp and Power employed 562 people at the mill, with a further 600 in woodland operations.

=== Development and incorporation ===
Before the mill, Hinton had one hotel, one general store, a two-room school, and two filling stations to serve a population of about 180; it couldn't immediately support this increase in population. To jump start development of real estate and services, Northwest Pulp and Power created its own subsidiary, the Athabasca Valley Development Corporation, with Ruben as its vice president. In spring 1955, the corporation began plans to provide town services and a shopping centre, prompting the Minister of Municipal Affairs Ted Hinman to clarify that the province was in charge of planning and Hinton would not be a company town. In December 1955, Ruben announced plans to build 500 houses in the new town. He followed that up with an announcement that the pulp mill would be expanded within 18 months to a total cost of $100 million and that the town would be named New Hinton. This was swiftly denied by Minister of Lands and Forests Norman Willmore. Ruben responded that, "the matter is entirely out of Mr. Willmore's department," and clarified that he was expressing his personal opinion that they would, "expand the mill at the earliest possible date." The Financial Post, in 1959, reported that the pulp mill cost $42 million.

The New Town of Hinton was incorporated on 1 November 1956. The community grew rapidly, as did a new village to the east called Drinnan. On 27 March 1957, the two communities amalgamated, with a population of about 3,500. The New Town of Hinton incorporated as the Town of Hinton on 29 December 1958, and William A. Switzer was elected as its first mayor. Three years later, the 1961 Canadian census recorded Hinton's population as 3,529.

=== Hinton train collision ===
On 8 February 1986, a Canadian National Railway freight train collided with a Via Rail passenger train called the Super Continental, killing twenty-three people. The Hinton train collision was the deadliest rail disaster in Canada since the Dugald rail accident of 1947, which had thirty-one fatalities, and was not surpassed until the Lac-Mégantic rail disaster in 2013, which resulted in forty-seven fatalities. It was surmised that the accident was a result of the crew of the freight train becoming incapacitated, and the resulting investigations revealed serious flaws in Canadian National Railway's labour practices.

== Geography ==
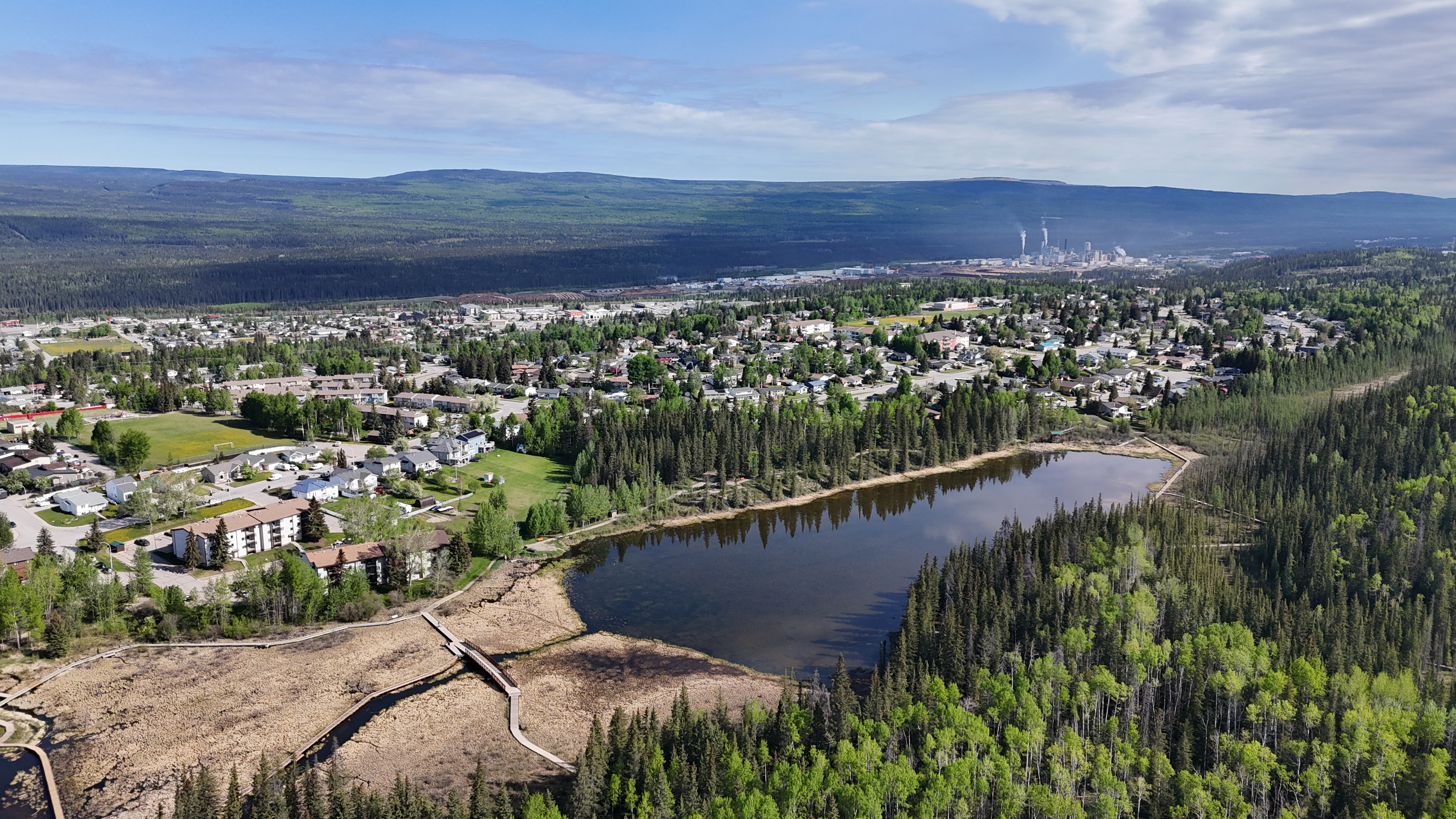
Hinton is in the Athabasca River valley, in the foothills.

Hinton is situated along a 10.5 kilometres (6.5 mi) stretch of the Athabasca River valley, on the southeast side of the river. The western town boundary is Highway 40 South. Highway 16 and the CN Rail tracks run side-by-side, approximately parallel to the river and divide the town lengthwise – the area downhill of the tracks and highway, towards the river, is generally referred to as the Valley District and the area above the tracks and highway is called The Hill District. Hinton has nine districts: Eaton, Hardisty, Hillcrest, Miette, Mountain View, Riverside, Terrace Heights, Thompson Lake, and West Riverside.

Hinton lies in the Alberta Plateau Benchlands physiographic subdivision of the Interior Plains. Soils around town are influenced by deposits of carbonate-rich, wind-blown sand and silt which usually have surface textures of loam, sandy loam or silt loam. They are moderately alkaline, in contrast to the varying, mostly moderate acidity which prevails beyond the zone of calcareous aeolian material.

=== Climate ===
Under the Köppen climate classification, Hinton is classified as Dfc: subarctic, a subcategory of the continental climates. This is defined as having its coldest month averaging below 0 °C (32 °F), three months averaging above 10 °C (50 °F), and no season contributing more than 70% of the annual precipitation.

The closest Environment Canada weather station was located at Entrance, about 10 km (6.2 mi) southwest of Hinton. It supplied climate normals data up to 2010. Current Environment Canada weather forecasts and climate normals data up to 2020 rely on the Jasper Warden Station near Maligne Canyon, 61 kilometres (38 mi) southwest of Hinton.

Climate data for Entrance Climate ID: 3062440; coordinates 53°22′N 117°42′W; elevation: 990.6 m (3,250 ft); 1981–2010 normals, extremes 1917-2006
Month	Jan	Feb	Mar	Apr	May	Jun	Jul	Aug	Sep	Oct	Nov	Dec	Year
Record high °C (°F)	22.2 (72.0)	19.0 (66.2)	22.0 (71.6)	27.8 (82.0)	33.9 (93.0)	34.4 (93.9)	37.8 (100.0)	34.4 (93.9)	34.0 (93.2)	29.4 (84.9)	21.1 (70.0)	17.8 (64.0)	37.8 (100.0)
Mean daily maximum °C (°F)	−3.3 (26.1)	1.1 (34.0)	5.1 (41.2)	11.5 (52.7)	16.3 (61.3)	20.0 (68.0)	22.2 (72.0)	21.7 (71.1)	17.1 (62.8)	10.4 (50.7)	1.8 (35.2)	−1.3 (29.7)	10.2 (50.4)
Daily mean °C (°F)	−9.2 (15.4)	−5.9 (21.4)	−2.2 (28.0)	3.9 (39.0)	8.4 (47.1)	12.3 (54.1)	14.4 (57.9)	13.6 (56.5)	9.2 (48.6)	3.9 (39.0)	−3.7 (25.3)	−7.0 (19.4)	3.1 (37.6)
Mean daily minimum °C (°F)	−15.0 (5.0)	−12.8 (9.0)	−9.5 (14.9)	−3.7 (25.3)	0.6 (33.1)	4.6 (40.3)	6.6 (43.9)	5.5 (41.9)	1.3 (34.3)	−2.7 (27.1)	−9.3 (15.3)	−12.6 (9.3)	−3.9 (25.0)
Record low °C (°F)	−51.2 (−60.2)	−47.0 (−52.6)	−42.8 (−45.0)	−35.6 (−32.1)	−13.5 (7.7)	−6.7 (19.9)	−2.8 (27.0)	−5.0 (23.0)	−19.4 (−2.9)	−27.0 (−16.6)	−39.0 (−38.2)	−47.2 (−53.0)	−51.2 (−60.2)
Average precipitation mm (inches)	24.3 (0.96)	12.9 (0.51)	22.1 (0.87)	25.9 (1.02)	62.5 (2.46)	76.3 (3.00)	94.0 (3.70)	73.9 (2.91)	46.3 (1.82)	33.1 (1.30)	22.1 (0.87)	14.4 (0.57)	507.9 (20.00)
Average rainfall mm (inches)	0.8 (0.03)	0.4 (0.02)	1.6 (0.06)	17.3 (0.68)	56.5 (2.22)	76.3 (3.00)	94.0 (3.70)	73.9 (2.91)	44.6 (1.76)	19.0 (0.75)	2.4 (0.09)	0.3 (0.01)	387.0 (15.24)
Average snowfall cm (inches)	23.5 (9.3)	12.5 (4.9)	20.5 (8.1)	8.6 (3.4)	6.0 (2.4)	0.0 (0.0)	0.0 (0.0)	0.1 (0.0)	1.6 (0.6)	14.2 (5.6)	19.7 (7.8)	14.2 (5.6)	120.9 (47.6)
Average precipitation days (≥ 0.2 mm)	5.8	4.2	6.5	6.6	11.3	13.0	12.6	12.8	11.1	6.4	5.9	4.7	100.9
Average rainy days (≥ 0.2 mm)	0.4	0.1	0.6	4.2	10.8	13.0	12.6	12.8	10.9	4.6	0.9	0.1	70.9
Average snowy days (≥ 0.2 cm)	5.5	4.1	6.1	3.0	1.3	0.0	0.0	0.0	0.5	2.7	5.3	4.6	33.0
Source: Environment and Climate Change Canada

== Demographics ==
Federal census population history of Hinton
Year	Pop.	±%
1951	203	—
1956	948	+367.0%
1961	3,529	+272.3%
1966	4,307	+22.0%
1971	4,911	+14.0%
1976	6,731	+37.1%
1981	8,342	+23.9%
1986	8,630	+3.5%
1991	9,046	+4.8%
1996	9,961	+10.1%
2001	9,405	−5.6%
2006	9,738	+3.5%
2011	9,640	−1.0%
2016	9,882	+2.5%
2021	9,817	−0.7%
Source: Statistics Canada

In the 2021 Canadian census conducted by Statistics Canada, the Town of Hinton had a population of 9,817 living in 4,006 of its 4,405 total private dwellings, a change of −0.7% from its 2016 population of 9,882. With a land area of 33.32 km^{2} (12.86 sq mi), it had a population density of 294.6/km^{2} (763.1/sq mi) in 2021.

The 2021 census also found that 52.1% of the population in Hinton were men (Canada-wide: 49.3%). Hinton's proportion of population that are under 15 years of age was 18.8% (Canada-wide: 16.3%), between 15 and 64 was 68.0% (Canada-wide: 64.8%), and 65 or over was 13.2% (Canada-wide: 19.0%).

The median employment income in 2020 in people 15 years or older was $45,600 in Hinton (Canada-wide: $37,200). The percentage of 25–64 year olds in Hinton who completed high school was 77.9% (Canada-wide: 88.4%). Hinton's English-French bilingualism rate was 8.5% (Canada-wide: 18%). Immigrants make up 11.3% of Hinton's population (Canada-wide: 23.0%).

In the Canada 2016 Census conducted by Statistics Canada, the Town of Hinton recorded a population of 9,882 living in 3,930 of its 4,343 total private dwellings, a 2.5% increase from its 2011 population of 9,640. With a land area of 33.52 km^{2} (12.94 sq mi), it had a population density of 294.8/km^{2} (763.6/sq mi) in 2016.

The population of the Town of Hinton according to its 2009 municipal census is 9,825. The census originally counted 9,812 people within the town limits but an additional 13 were added when a long-standing annexation application was approved shortly after the census was conducted.

It is the site of the Foothills Ojibway Society (non-status First Nation).

Panethnic groups in the Town of Hinton (2001−2021)
Panethnic group	2021		2016		2011		2006		2001	
Panethnic group	Pop.	%	Pop.	%	Pop.	%	Pop.	%	Pop.	%
European (Note: Statistic includes all persons that did not make up part of a visible minority or an indigenous identity.)	7,110	73.15%	7,705	78.7%	7,950	83.25%	8,320	85.42%	8,000	85.38%
Indigenous	1,330	13.68%	1,170	11.95%	1,085	11.36%	1,145	11.76%	1,020	10.89%
Southeast Asian (Note: Statistic includes total responses of "Filipino" and "Southeast Asian" under visible minority section on census.)	675	6.94%	485	4.95%	270	2.83%	115	1.18%	70	0.75%
South Asian	210	2.16%	75	0.77%	30	0.31%	10	0.1%	10	0.11%
East Asian (Note: Statistic includes total responses of "Chinese", "Korean", and "Japanese" under visible minority section on census.)	165	1.7%	115	1.17%	30	0.31%	100	1.03%	215	2.29%
African	105	1.08%	110	1.12%	80	0.84%	10	0.1%	25	0.27%
Latin American	55	0.57%	15	0.15%	50	0.52%	20	0.21%	25	0.27%
Middle Eastern (Note: Statistic includes total responses of "West Asian" and "Arab" under visible minority section on census.)	30	0.31%	20	0.2%	0	0%	20	0.21%	15	0.16%
Other/multiracial (Note: Statistic includes total responses of "Visible minority, n.i.e." and "Multiple visible minorities" under visible minority section on census.)	40	0.41%	85	0.87%	40	0.42%	10	0.1%	10	0.11%
Total responses	9,720	99.01%	9,790	99.07%	9,550	99.07%	9,740	100.02%	9,370	99.63%
Total population	9,817	100%	9,882	100%	9,640	100%	9,738	100%	9,405	100%
Note: Totals greater than 100% due to multiple origin responses

== Economy ==
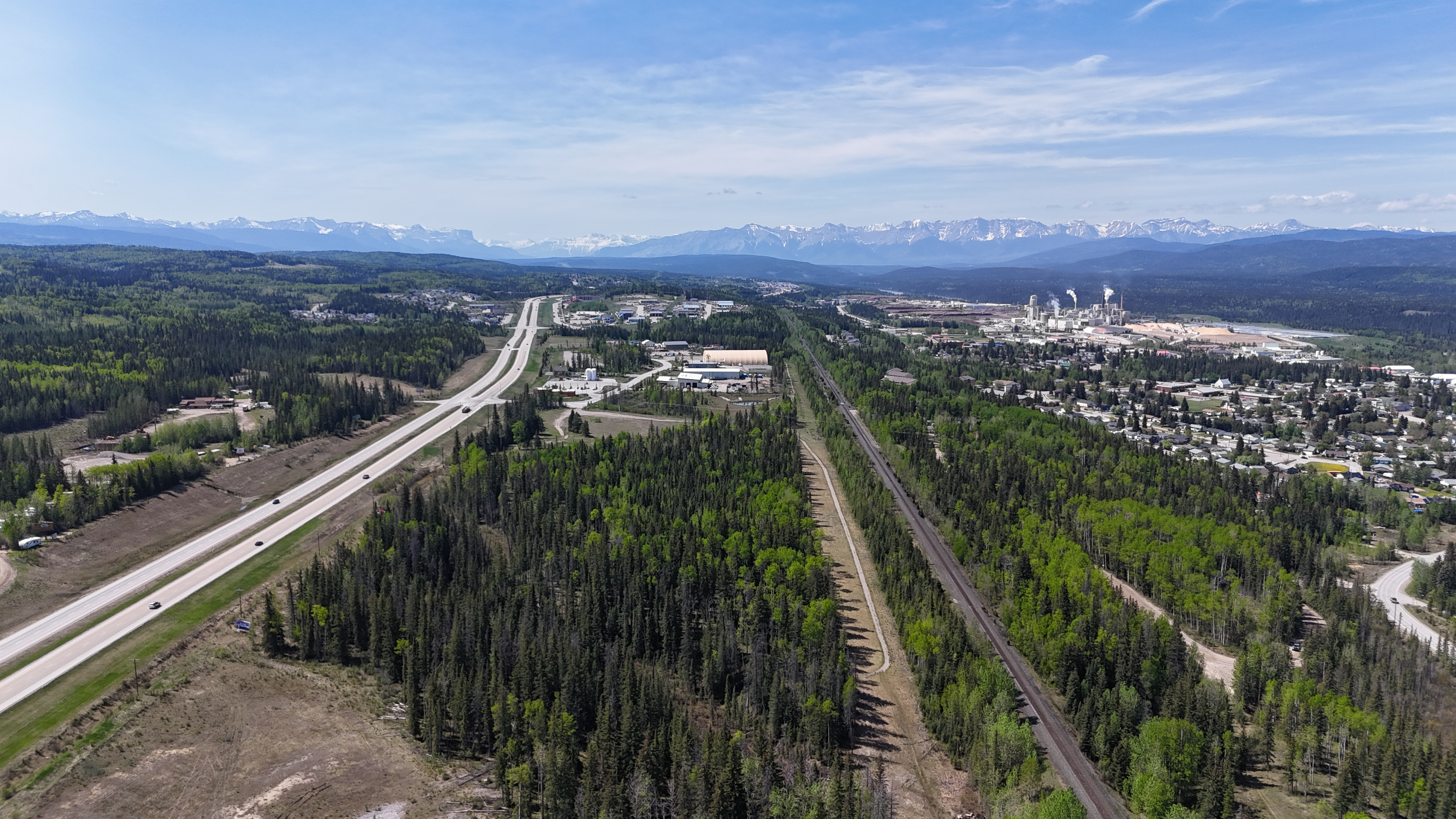
Hinton with its industrial core to the right of Highway 16 and the CN tracks

Throughout the 20th century, Hinton's economy has been resource-based, including coal, timber, natural gas, and petroleum. By the 1980s, the service industry, tourism, and the Forest Technology School had diversified the economy. In 2021, sales and service occupations made up the largest share of Hinton's labour force at 28.9%, followed by trades, transport, and equipment operators (25.0%), then business, finance, and administration (12.0%).

== Arts and culture ==
The Performing Arts Theatre of Hinton exhibits films, live theatre, music, dance, and other events. The Wild Mountain Music Festival is held on the third weekend of July across the Athabasca River from Hinton at the Entrance Ranch. The 3-day event has 2 concert stages, a beer tent, food stalls, tent and RV camping, and runs a shuttle between Hinton and the festival. The annual event began in 2008.

The Northern Rockies Museum of Culture and Heritage is in the original GTP Hinton station. It was moved from its original location across the highway and, after renovations, opened 20 May 2017.

== Recreation ==
=== In town ===
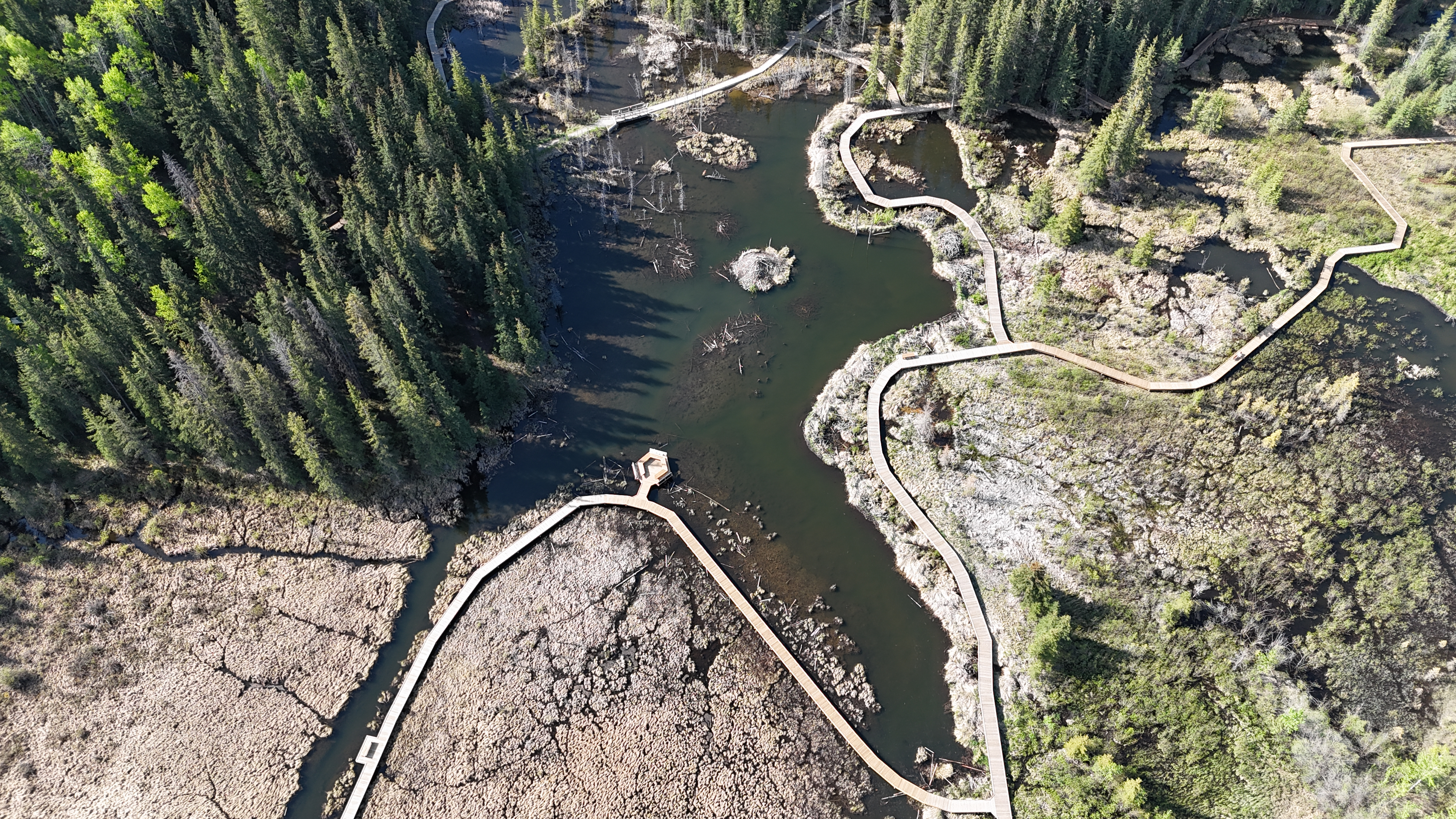
Aerial view of a portion of the boardwalk

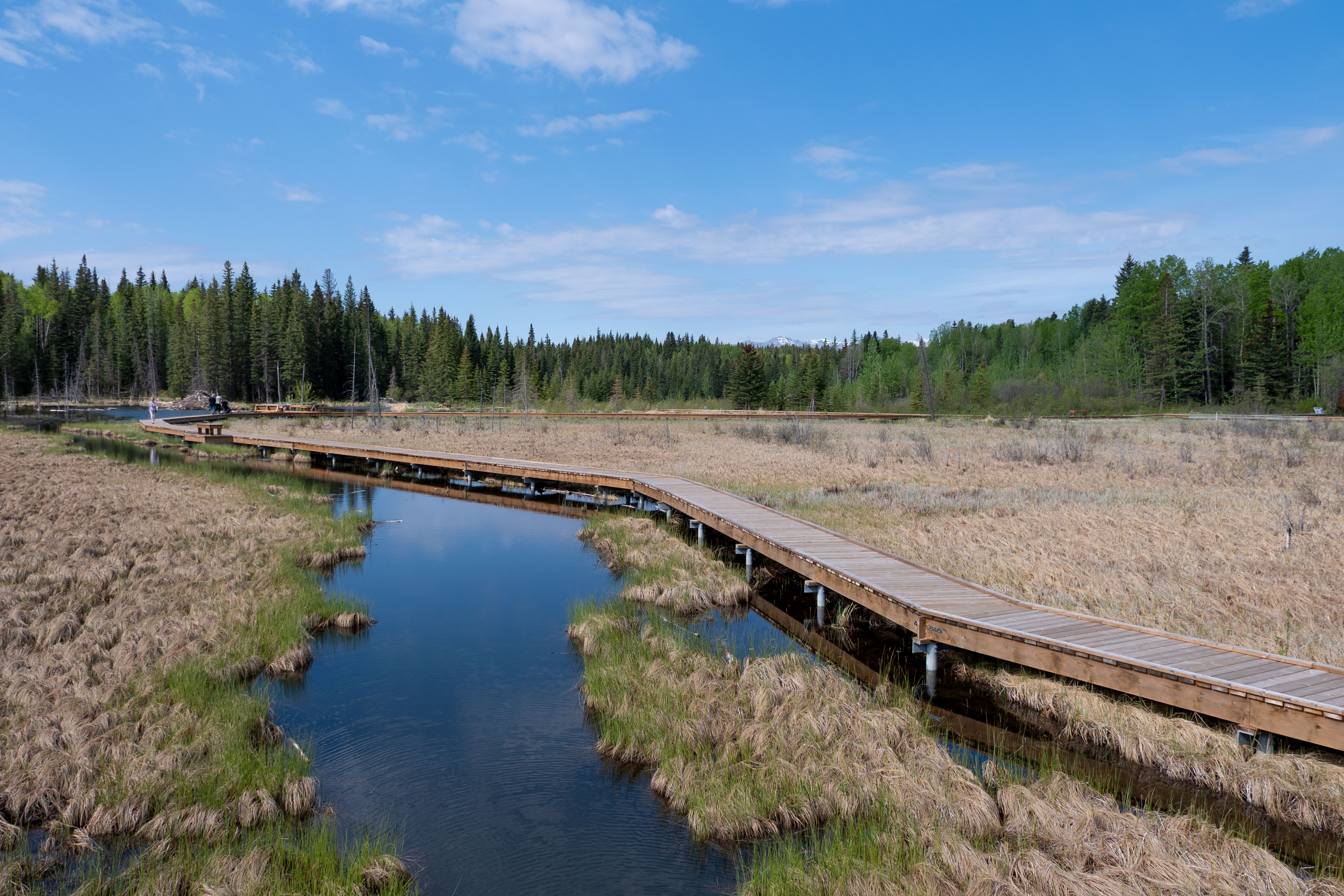
The Beaver Boardwalk

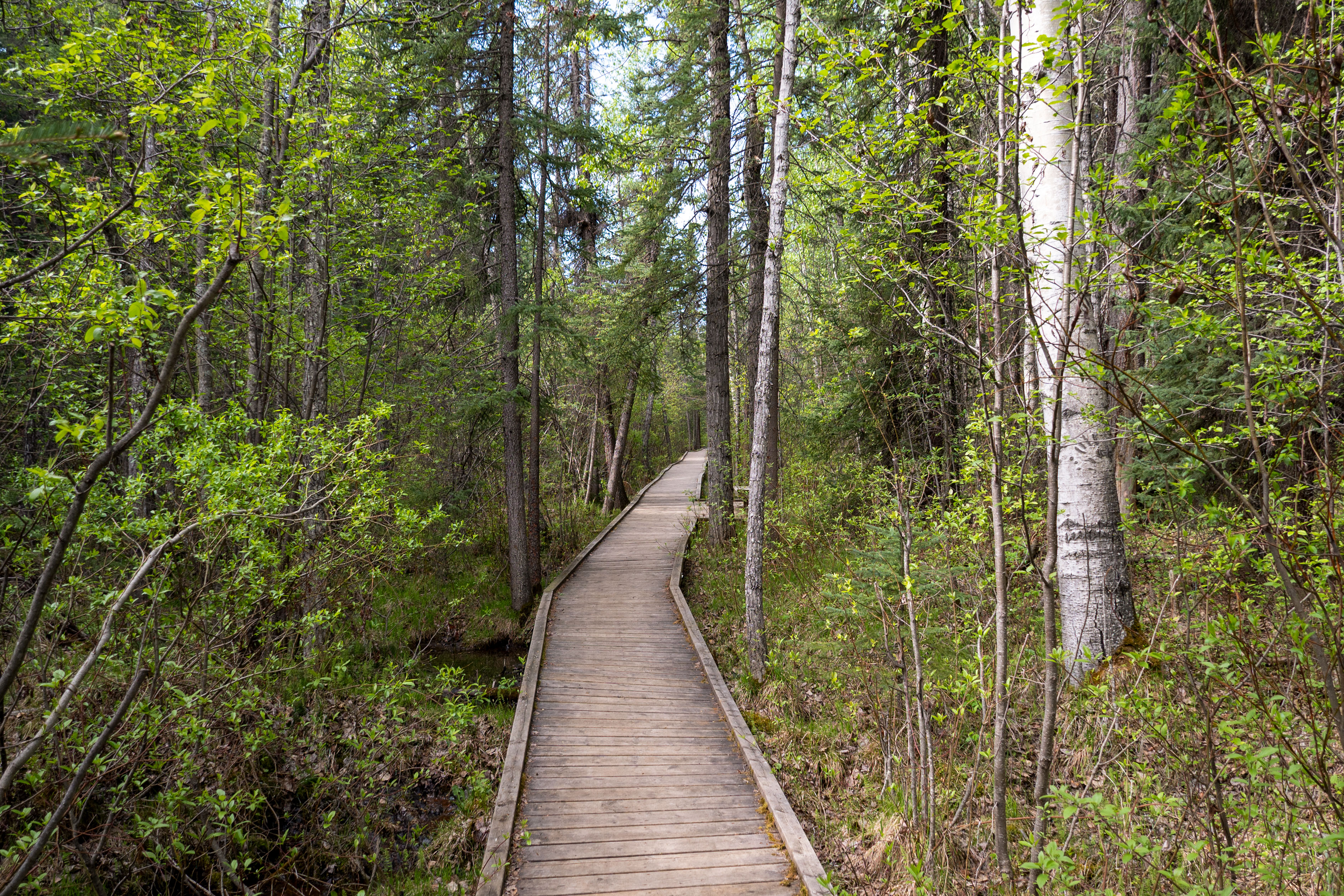
A forested portion of the boardwalk

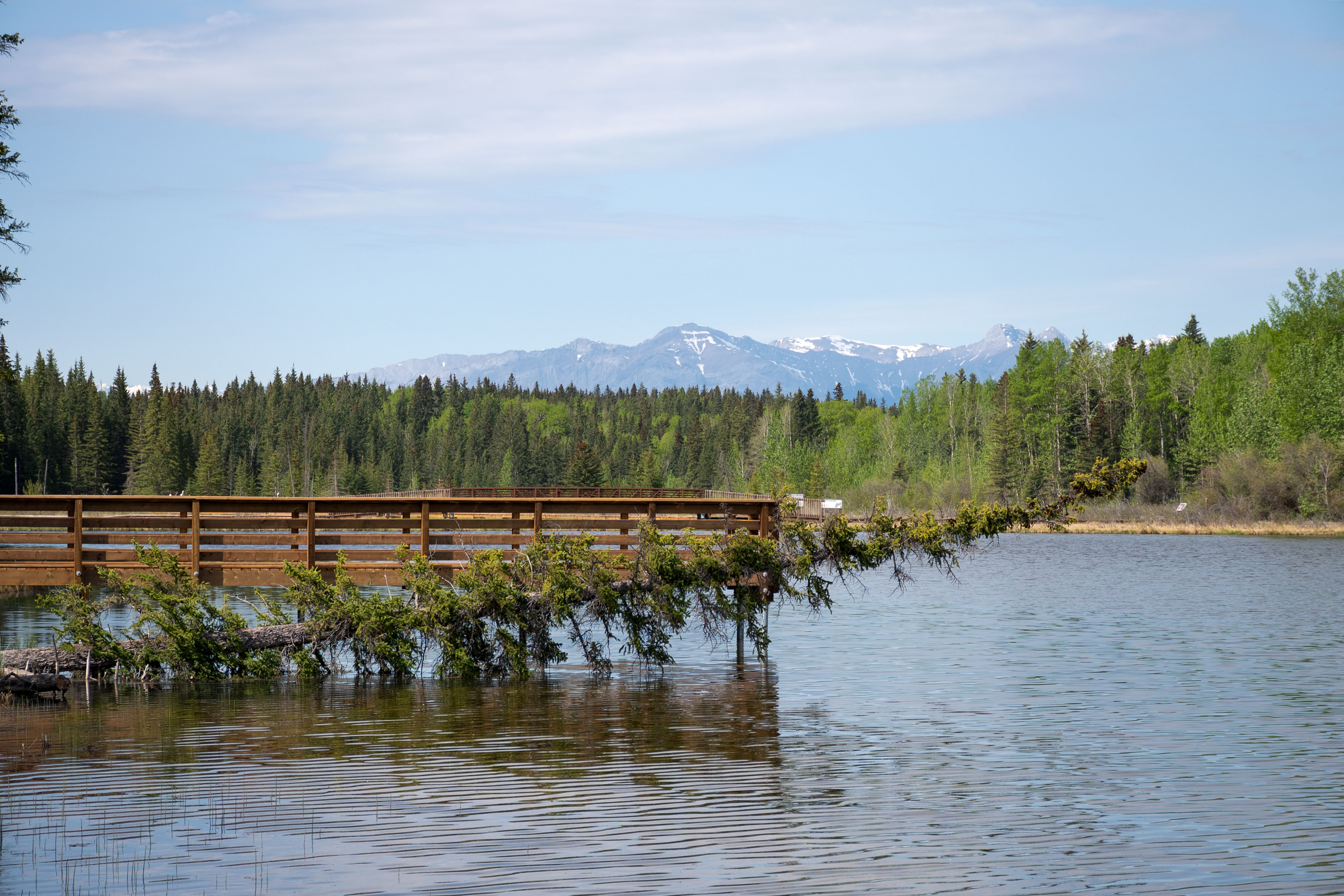
Maxwell Lake

The Beaver Boardwalk consists of three kilometres (1.9 miles) of boardwalk through the forest, meadow, and wetland near Maxwell Lake, at the south side of town. It is named for the active beaver lodge that it passes beside. Large sections of the boardwalk were rebuilt in early 2025, with more rehabilitation planned for future winters.

The Hinton Mountain Bike Park has 23 trails of varying difficulty, a skills area, pump track, and jumps. The bike park is connected to the Happy Creek trail network, which has an additional 39 maintained trails. The Bighorn Ridge trails begin 3.5 kilometres (2.2 mi) south of the bike park and offers an additional 33 kilometres (21 mi) of maintained mountain bike trail.

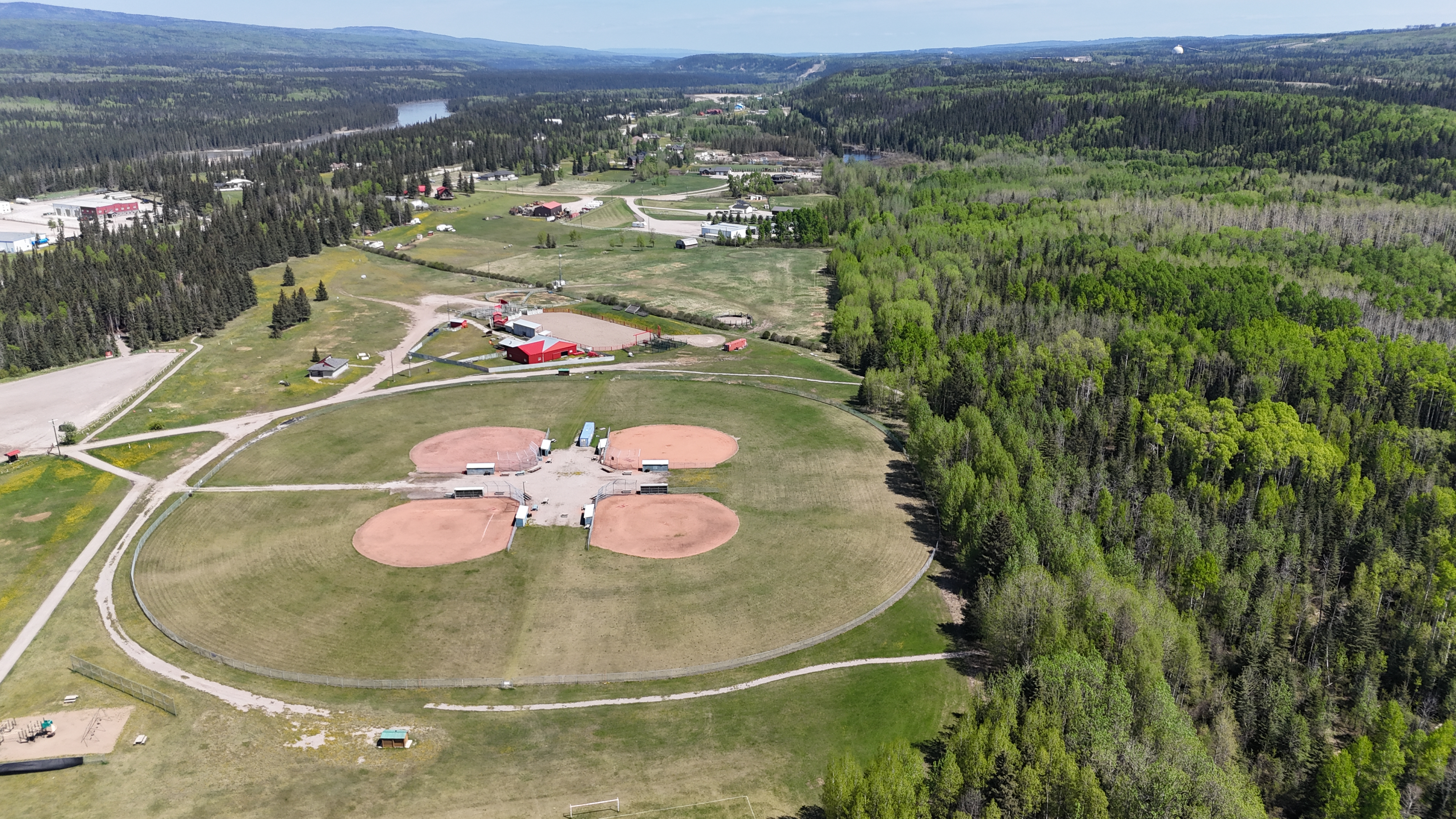
Mary Reimer Park

Hinton has both an 18-hole golf course and an 18-hole disc golf course. The town has numerous parks with a boat launch, rodeo grounds, sports fields, picnic facilities, and trails.

The Dr. Duncan Murray Recreation Centre has a 25m pool, sauna, hot tub, kids pool, two skating rinks, a bouldering wall, and courts for basketball, racquetball, and squash. It also includes the Hinton Municipal Library.

=== Regional ===
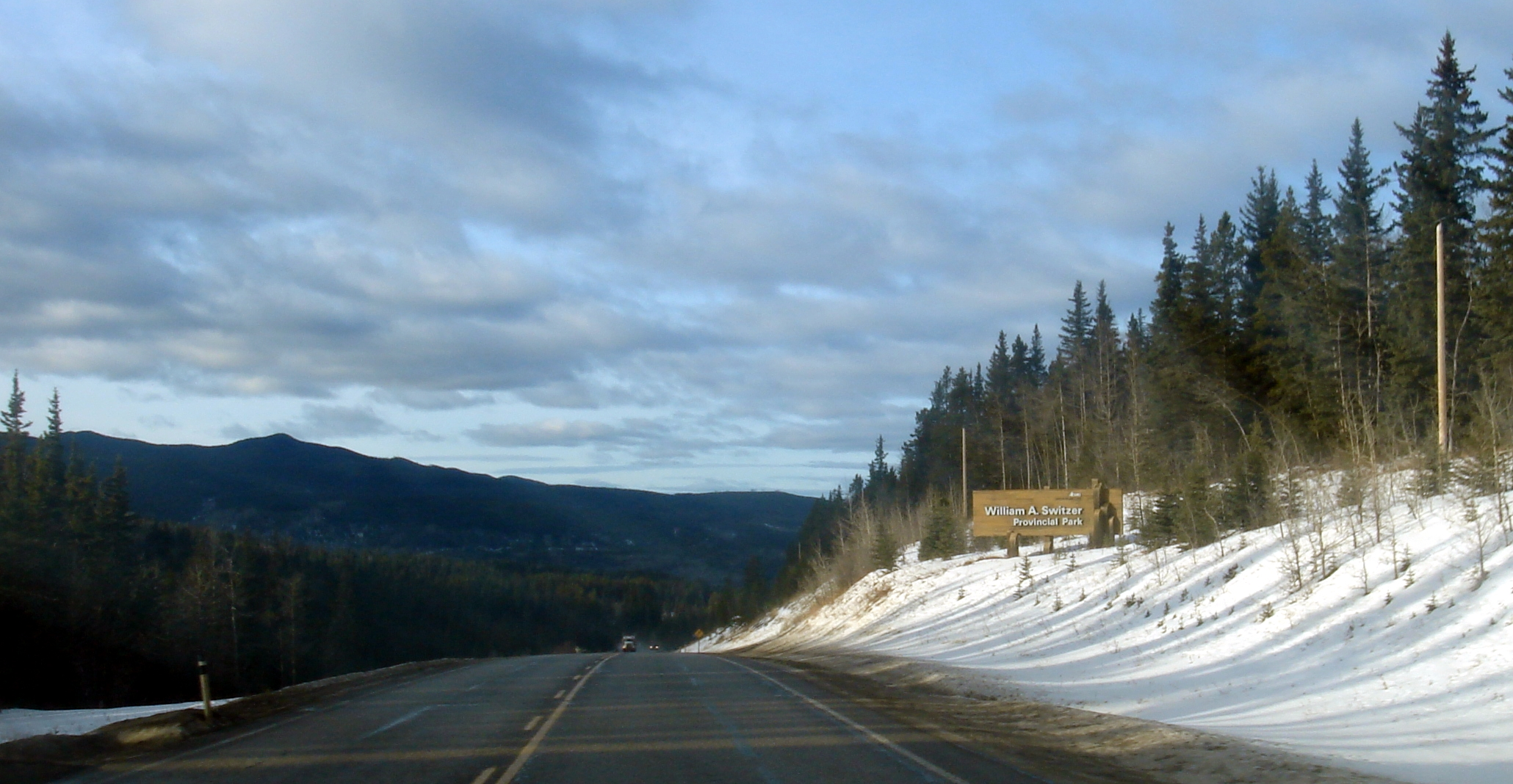
William A Switzer Provincial Park

Hinton is a short drive from several popular parks and recreation areas:

- Jasper National Park's east gate is 27 kilometres (17 mi) southwest on Highway 16.
- Obed Lake Campground is 30 kilometres (19 mi) east on Highway 16.
- The Hinton Nordic Centre is 22 kilometres (14 mi) northwest on Highway 40.
- Switzer Park Visitor Centre is 27 kilometres (17 mi) northwest.
- Rock Lake is 73 kilometres (45 mi) northwest.
- Whitehorse Creek Campground is 57 kilometres (35 mi) south on Highway 40.
- Cardinal Divide is 73 kilometres (45 mi) south

Hinton is a staging area for expeditions into the Willmore Wilderness Park, via Rock Lake or Big Berland Provincial Recreation Area. The other common staging area is Grande Cache.

== Governance ==
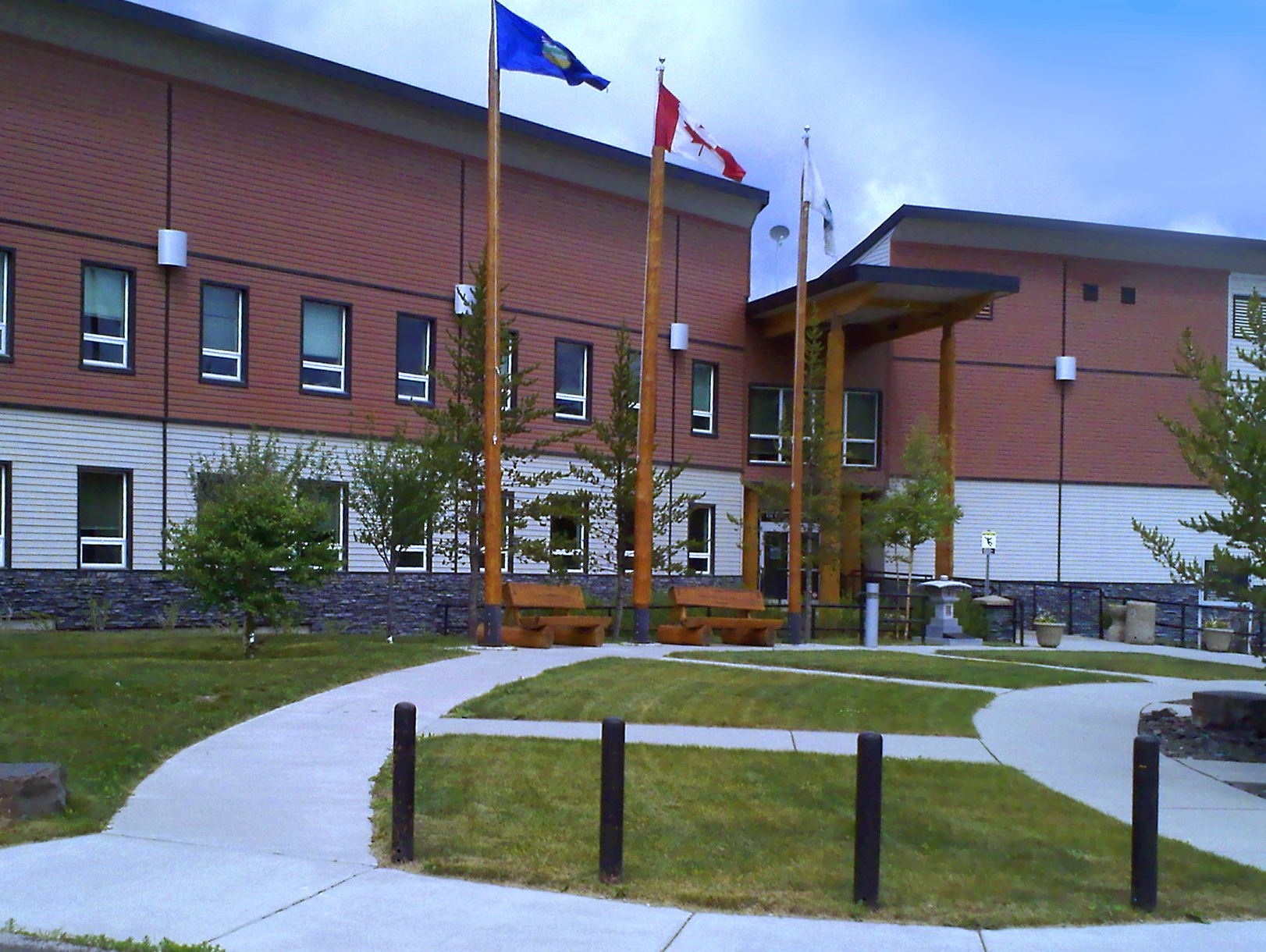
Hinton Government Centre

2026 By-election	Vote	%
**Lori-Anne Frattinger**	**508**	**26**
**Lyla Mozel**	**485**	**25**
Kristine (Kris) Haslett	449	23
Debbie Workun	338	17
Eric Rosendahl	187	10
Two councilor vacancies. **Bold** indicates elected.

2025 Mayoral Candidates	Vote	%
Nicholas Nissen (X)	452	19
**Brian LaBerge**	**1222**	**52**
David Michael Rees	665	28
(X) indicates incumbent. **Bold** indicates elected.

2025 Councillor Candidates	Vote
**Kristen Chambers (X)**	**1375**
Trevor Haas (X)	798
Ryan Maguhn (X)	776
**Natalie Charlton**	**1462**
**Gail Dunn**	**1312**
**Donald MacLean**	**1093**
**William (Bill) McDonald**	**996**
Lyla Mozel	853
**Dewly Nelson**	**1271**
Mike Storey	736
(X) indicates incumbents. **Bold** indicates elected. Top six candidates are elected at large.

Hinton has a council-manager government system, where residents elect a mayor and six councilors every four years. They, in turn, appoint the Chief Administrative Officer to oversee management of town departments. The mayor and each councilor has equal voting power for enacting by-laws and policies, with the mayor serving also as the Chief Elected Official.

The government is empowered by the Municipal Government Act, which delimits its roles and responsibilities. These include property tax collection, building permits, by-law enforcement, road and utility maintenance, fire services, recreation, and transit.

=== Recent Elections ===
In October 2021, Marcel Michaels was re-elected as mayor to a second term, but resigned in August 2023. In a by-election in November, Nicholas Nissen defeated former councilor Brian LaBerge. Laberge's vacant seat was won by Kristen Chambers in the same by-election. The other councilors elected in 2021 were JoAnn Race, Ryan Maguhn, Trevor Haas, Albert Ostashek, and Stuart Taylor, who resigned in May 2025. As the municipal election was scheduled for October 20, 2025, there is no by-election for his seat.

In the 2025 Alberta Municipal Elections, LaBerge again ran for mayor, this time defeating incumbent Nissen. Longtime incumbent councilors Trevor Haas and Ryan Maguhn also lost their seats. Other incumbents Race, Ostashek, and Taylor did not seek re-election; only Chambers kept her seat. The other councilors elected were Natalie Charlton, Gail Dunn, Donald MacLean, William (Bill) McDonald, and former councilor Dewly Nelson. Out of 7,900 eligible electors, 2,369 voted, for a voter turnout of 29.9%.

Voters were also given three options in a non-binding plebiscite concerning the recreation centre. "Build New" received the most support with 1001 yes votes to 664 no votes. The percentage of voters who cast ballots for this question was 29.5%.

On August 27, 2026, Hinton held a by-election to replace councilors McDonald (deceased) and Nelson (resigned). Five candidates ran to fill the two vacancies, with Lori-Anne Frattinger and Lyla Mozel coming in first and second, respectively.

== Infrastructure ==
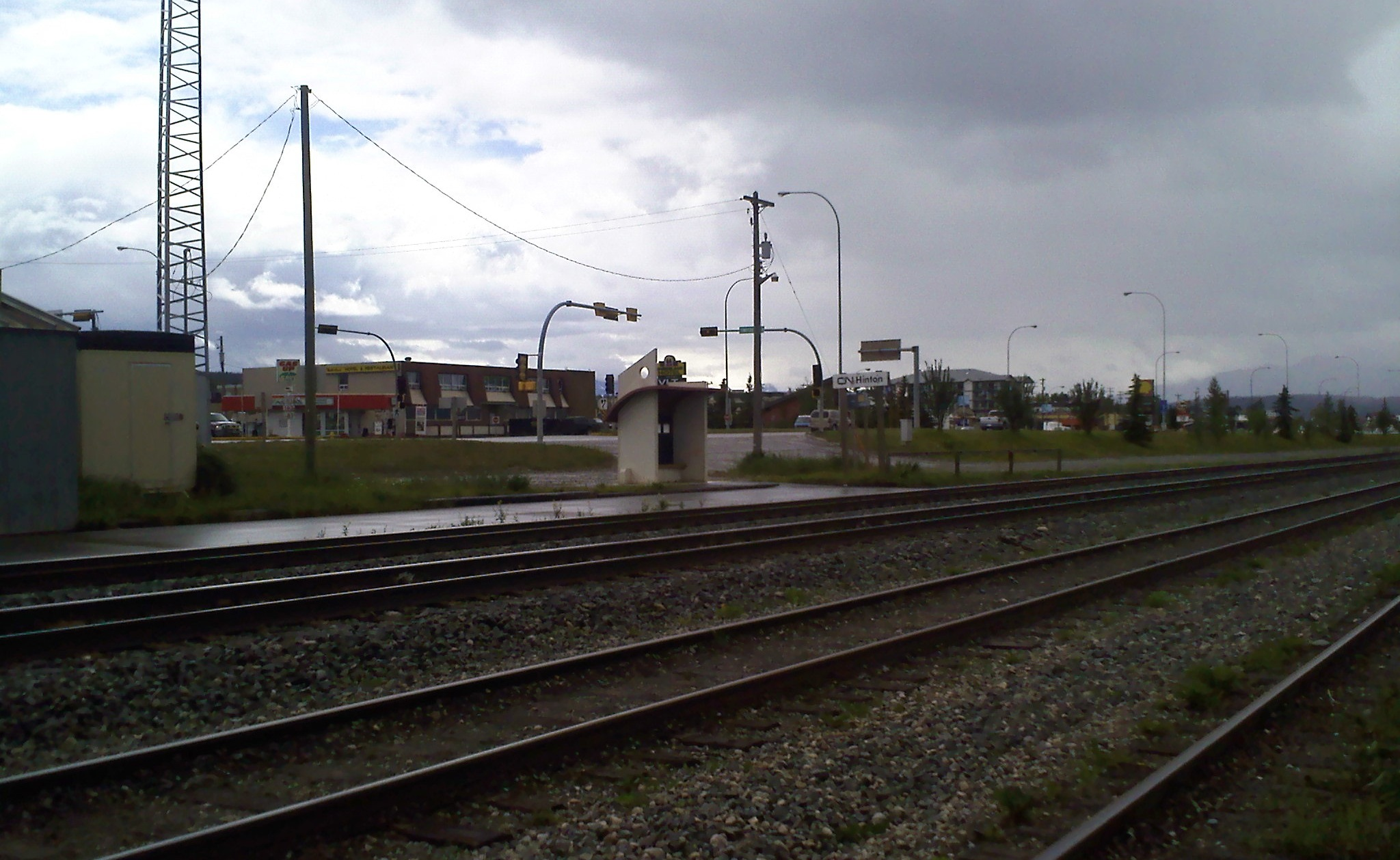
Hinton Railway Station

=== Transportation ===
Hinton Transit is the municipal public transportation service, operated under contract by First Student Canada, which is responsible for providing the vehicles, drivers and maintenance.

The bus service operates on Monday to Saturday from 7 am to 1 pm and 2:30 pm to 8:30 pm. No service is provided on Sunday or statutory holidays. It alternately runs a hill district loop and a valley district loop, returning to each stop at the same minute after the hour.

There is also an accessible, door-to-door transit service available upon request for residents with physical and cognitive disabilities called The Freedom Express.

Regional bus service is provided by SunDog Transportation and Tour Co. which has a daily route between Edmonton and Jasper, with one stop in Hinton. Starting in the summer of 2025, the province has funded a bus route between Jasper and Hinton that is $15 per trip, but free for Jasper residents displaced by the 2024 wildfire. It is operated by Jasper Transit, and is funded for approximately 2 years.

As a flag stop, Via Rail's The Canadian calls at the Hinton station two times per week, in each direction.

There are two small airports near Hinton. The Jasper-Hinton Airport is 9.5 nautical miles (17.6 km; 10.9 mi) southwest of Hinton on Highway 16. It is operated by Yellowhead County and is used by chartered air services supporting tourist, forestry, mining, and wildlife research activities. The Hinton/Entrance Airport is 6 nautical miles (11 km; 6.9 mi) west of town, across the Athabasca River. It is owned by Alberta Forestry and primarily supports wildfire fighting operations. It is operated by the Hinton Flying Club.

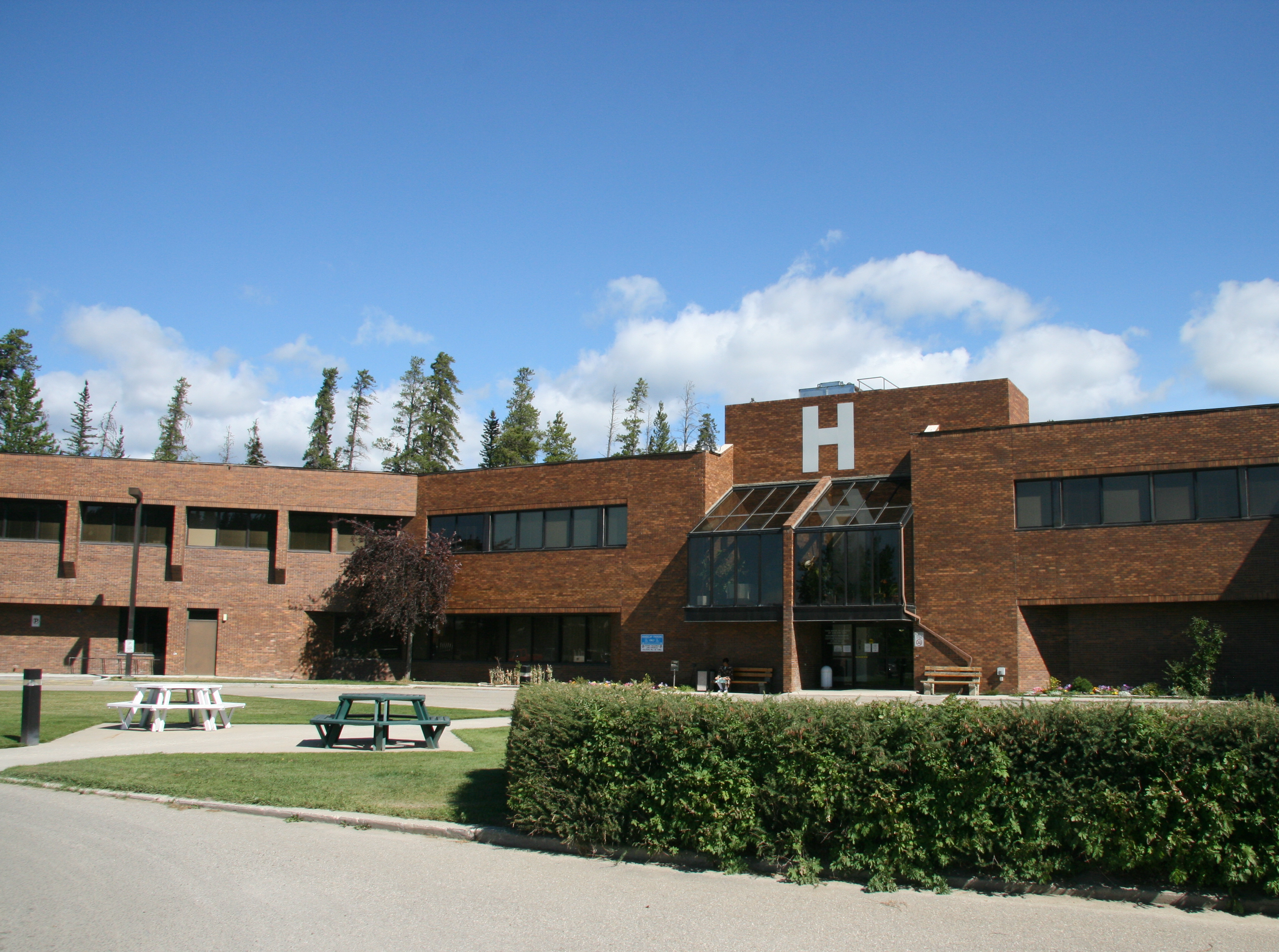
The Hinton Healthcare Centre's main building.

=== Health care ===
Emergency and other medical care is provided at the Hinton Healthcare Centre. The hospital offers a wide range of diagnostic testing, chronic and acute care, and recovery services. As of 2022, it has 23 acute care beds. Beginning in 2024, physician shortages have resulted in repeated closures of the emergency department, prompting the town to declare a local healthcare crisis.

== Education ==
Education in Hinton includes:

- Grande Yellowhead Public School Division No. 77
  - Crescent Valley Elementary School (K-7)
  - Mountain View Elementary School (K-7 English, French)
  - Harry Collinge High School (8-12 English, French)
- Evergreen Catholic Separate School Division
  - St. Gregory Catholic Elementary School (K-4)
  - Father Gerard Redmond Community Catholic School (5-12)
- Post secondary
  - Northwestern Polytechnic
  - Hinton Employment and Learning Place
  - Hinton Training Centre
  - Northern Lakes College

== Media ==
=== Newspapers ===
Hinton no longer has a local paper. The Hinton Voice, an independent newspaper that started in June 2009, printed its last issue on 28 August 2025. Hinton also had a weekly tabloid-format newspaper called the Hinton Parklander, which printed its final issue on 13 January 2020. The Parklander had published continuously since August 18, 1955, at first as the Hinton Herald. As it changed ownership, it also changed its name to Hinton Herald Parklander, Herald Parklander, and finally just the Parklander in 1976.

=== Radio ===
- CBXI-FM 88.1 CBC Radio One
- CFXH-FM 97.5 Newcap Broadcasting (Stingray Radio)
- CFHI-FM 104.9 Newcap Broadcasting

- CHFA-FM-4 100.7 Ici Radio-Canada Première
- CKUA-FM-7 102.5 CKUA Radio Network

== Notable people ==
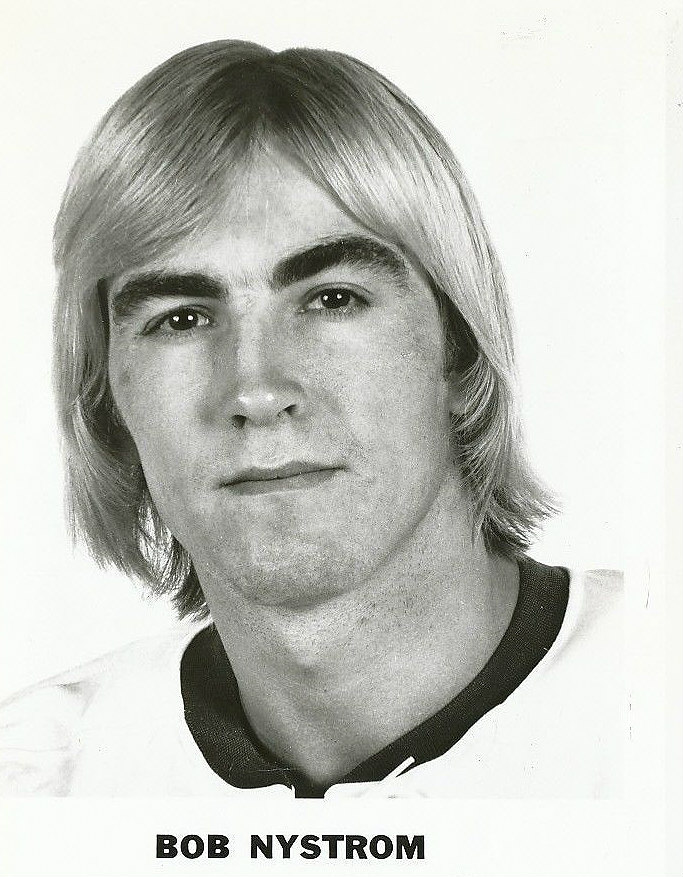
Bob Nystrom, Swedish-Canadian professional ice hockey player, moved to Hinton as a 4-year old

- Bob Nystrom (born 1952), Swedish-Canadian professional ice hockey player
- Arthur Peuchen, major of the Canadian armed forces, lived in Hinton most of his life until few weeks before his death in 1929, when he returned to his native Toronto.
- Dave Scatchard (born 1976), professional National Hockey League ice hockey player
- Glenn Taylor (born 1961/62), former leader of the Alberta Party, former mayor

== See also ==
- List of communities in Alberta
- List of francophone communities in Alberta
- List of towns in Alberta
