= Alberta Highway 47 =

Highway in Alberta, Canada

Highway 47

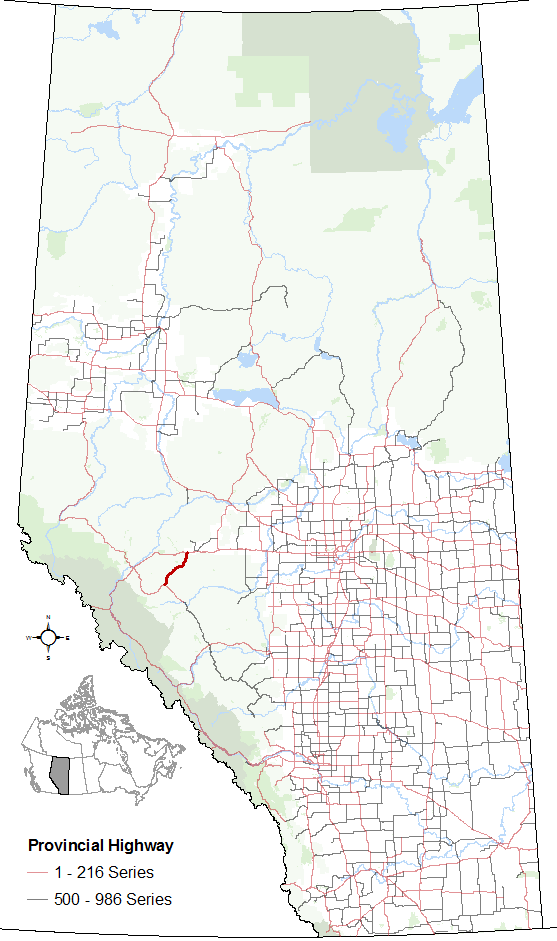

Route information
- Maintained by the Ministry of Transportation and Economic Corridors
- Length: 60.2 km (37.4 mi)

Major junctions
- South end: Highway 40 south of Robb
- North end: Highway 16 (TCH) west of Edson

Location
- Country: Canada
- Province: Alberta
- Specialized and rural municipalities: Yellowhead County

Highway system
- Alberta Numbered Highway Network; List; Former
← Highway 45	→ Highway 49

Alberta Provincial Highway No. 47, commonly referred to as Highway 47, is a north–south highway located in west–central Alberta, Canada that stretches from Highway 16 (Yellowhead Highway), approximately 10 km (6.2 mi) west of Edson, to Highway 40, approximately 6 km (3.7 mi) south of Robb.

The highway is paralleled by a spur of the Canadian National Railway that connects the main branch with the Coal Valley. It follows the McLeod River valley south of the Yellowhead Highway, then follows the Embarras River.

== Major intersections ==
From south to north. The entire route is in Yellowhead County.

Location	km	mi	Destinations	Notes
Coalspur	0.0	0.0	Highway 40 – Nordegg, Cadomin, Hinton	
Robb	8.4	5.2	Robb Road	Formerly part of the Forestry Trunk Road
Embarras	20.6	12.8		
	47.2	29.3	Crosses the McLeod River	
	60.2	37.4	Highway 16 (TCH/YH) – Jasper, Edson, Edmonton	Highway 16 exit 180; eastbound grade separated and westbound at-grade; future Highway 947 north
1.000 mi = 1.609 km; 1.000 km = 0.621 mi
