= Embarras, Alberta =

Locality in Alberta, Canada

Coordinates: 53°18′18″N 116°53′52″W

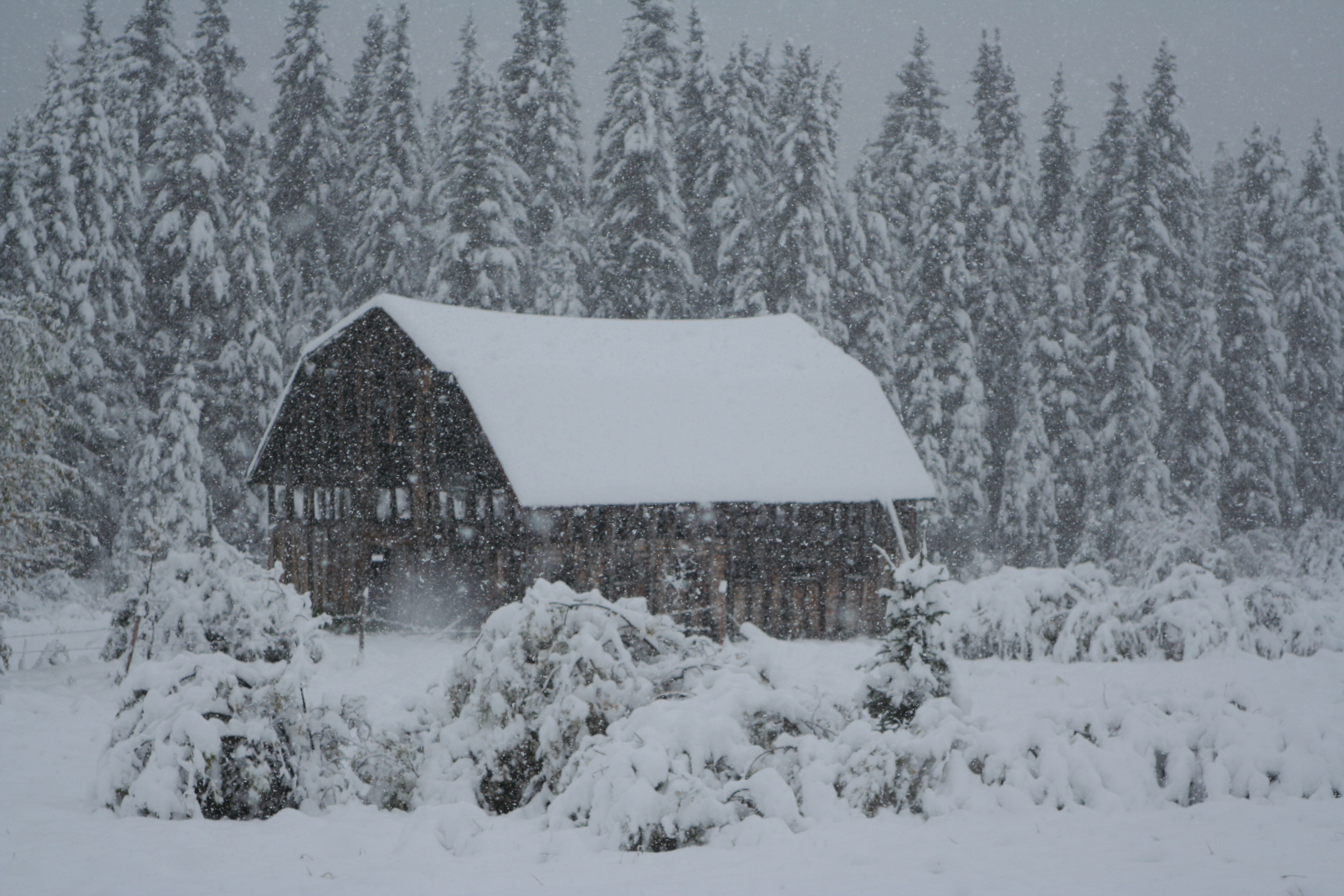
Barn at Embarras, 2006

Embarras is a locality in Yellowhead County, Alberta, Canada. It takes its name from the Embarras River. 'Embarrass' is French for 'barrier', probably in reference to the piles of driftwood that often clog the shallow, winding river.

== History ==
Embarras was founded in 1913 by the Grand Trunk Pacific Railway (GTP) when that company built the Alberta Coal Branch line south from Edson on the Edmonton-Prince Rupert mainline. The Coal Branch line was constructed by the Grand Trunk Pacific Branch Lines Company (GTPRBL) from the mainline at Bickerdike south to Coalspur and Lovett. Coal mines were opened by GTP subsidiaries at Mercoal, Cadomin and Mountain Park.

Embarras, along with other sidings on the Coal Branch Line such as McLeod River, Erith, Weald, and Oke were all ghost towns by the 1960s with the decline in coal mining as railways converted to diesel locomotives. The Embarras siding housed a GTP type "E" station house on the north side of the tracks that was common on the Coal Branch Line. The station house was removed in 1968 and the railbed regraded, removing all traces of the station.

Prest Creek flows into the Embarras River near the station. E. B. Johnson and Son operated a sawmill on the site between 1940 and 1963. Remnants of several buildings can still be found on site today. There are no permanent residents but the site is still popular with users who can access the multitude of recreational activities in the area.

== See also ==
- List of ghost towns in Alberta
