= Mountain View Estates, Alberta =

Mountain View Estates, Alberta may refer to:

- Mountain View Estates, Rocky View County, Alberta
- Mountain View Estates, Yellowhead County, Alberta
