= Alberta Coal Branch =

Railway line in Canada

Coordinates: 53°11′N 117°01′W

Overview
- Status: Open
- Locale: Yellowhead County
- Termini: Alberta Highway 16; Brazeau River

Service
- Type: Branch
- System: Canadian National Railway
- Services: 2

History
- Opened: 1912

Technical
- Line length: 57 mi (92 km)
- Track gauge: 4 ft 8 1/2 in (1,435 mm) standard gauge

Location of the Coal Branch in Alberta

The Alberta Coal Branch is the name given to a segment of the Canadian National Railway (originally the Grand Trunk Pacific Railway) and the region through which it passes. It is located within Yellowhead County in west-central Alberta, Canada.

== Geography ==
The Coal Branch region encompasses a portion of the eastern slopes and foothills of the Canadian Rockies east of Jasper National Park. It extends from Alberta Highway 16 in the north to the Brazeau River in the south. The McLeod, Lovett and Embarras Rivers flow through it, and it includes many former coal-mining towns and ghost towns.

== History ==
The Coal Branch rail line was built between 1911 and 1912 by the Grand Trunk Pacific Railway to gain access to deposits of high-quality steam coal. It diverges from the main line at Bickerdike and runs south through Coalspur to the Lovett River, a distance of 57 miles (90 km). A series of coal mining, railroad, and logging towns quickly developed along the route. Going south from Bickerdike, they include McLeod River, Erith, Weald, Embarras, Robb, Coalspur, Diss, Sterco, Foothills and Lovetteville.

A western branch that opened in the summer of 1913 diverges at Coalspur and extends 37 miles (60 km) to Mountain Park. Along that route lie Mercoal, Shaw, Leyland, Cadomin, and Mountain Park. In 1921 a spur 5 miles (10 km) long was built to Luscar.

The Coal Branch towns thrived from the arrival of the railroad until markets for steam coal declined as the railroads replaced steam locomotives with diesel. Most of the mines closed during the 1950s, after which the population quickly declined and many of the towns were abandoned.

Today the permanent population of the area is small, but the scenic mountain setting makes the Coal Branch area a popular destination for all types of outdoor recreation. Coal mining continues near Luscar, producing coking coal for export to Asian steel mills, but most of the workforce lives to the north in Edson and Hinton.
