= Luscar, Alberta =

Luscar
- Locality
- Location within Yellowhead County Location within Alberta
- Coordinates: 53°04′N 117°24′W
- Country: Canada
- Province: Alberta
- Municipal district: Yellowhead County

Government
  - Type: Unincorporated
  - Mayor: Jim Eglinski
  - Governing body: Yellowhead County Council: Shawn Brian Berry; Sandra Cherniawsky; Anthony Giezen; Dawn Mitchell; Fred Priestley-Wright; David Russell; William Velichko; Jack Williams
- Time zone: UTC−06:00 (Alberta Time)
- Area codes: 780, 587, 825

Luscar is a ghost town and former coal mining community in west-central Alberta, Canada. Located in the foothills of the Northern Rockies, its abandoned site lies 7 kilometres (4.3 mi) northwest of Cadomin. It is accessible along the Bighorn Highway (Highway 40), at the end of the CN Railway line.

== Toponymy ==
Luscar is named after Luscar Coals Ltd., the first commercial mining operation with a presence in the area. In turn, the company was named after two historic states, Luscar and Craigluscar, situated near Dunfermline, Scotland.

== Topography ==
Luscar was situated along the historic Alberta Coal Branch, a railway line that served several coal mining operations. Coal seams in Luscar date to the Lower Cretaceous period. The area's terrain is rugged, befitting the mountainous area.

=== Ecology ===
Flora native to Luscar includes the lodgepole pine and Engelmann spruce. Luscar hosts populations of bighorn sheep, grizzly bears, elk, voles, martens, and mink.

== History ==
=== Establishment: 1911–1929 ===
Small-scale underground mining began in the area around 1911.

In 1921, Luscar Coals Ltd. (also known as Luscar Collieries) established a permanent underground mining operation that became the community's economic core. The company was closely affiliated with operations in nearby Mountain Park. As a locality, Luscar formally received its name that same year, when the Grand Trunk Pacific Railway established a station to serve the company. Luscar received a dedicated post office in November.

Because Luscar's coal mine was comparatively smaller than nearby settlements along the Alberta Coal Branch, its development lagged its neighbours until business began to improve in the mid-1920s. Luscar had expanded enough by 1924 that residents established Luscar School that year, followed by a Catholic church the next year.

In their downtime, Luscar's miners primarily occupied themselves with drinking, gambling, and frequenting prostitutes who began trading in the area. The local tavern and pool hall formed the centre of Luscar's social scene. Some men formed the Luscar Collieries Silver Band, a brass band that competed at the Edmonton Exhibition during the late 1920s and won several prizes.

Luscar's hockey team, pictured c. 1920.

=== Great Depression and abandonment: 1930–1959 ===
Luscar was lucrative enough by 1934 that its colliery invested heavily in a new coal cleaning plant, despite being in the midst of the Great Depression. Locals formed a baseball team, the Luscar Indians, that competed against teams comprising locals from other Coal Branch towns. The team won the Northern Alberta Senior Hockey League in March 1936, beating the Edmonton Superiors.

Demand for coal spiked during the Second World War, and Luscar's population reached a peak of 650 in 1941. By this time, the community had expanded to contain a pool room, movie theatre, and hotel, the latter of which provided catering for Luscar's population of around 150 single men.

On May 12, 1945, an explosion in Luscar's underground mine killed seven workers. The mine was temporarily closed and flooded to prevent another explosion from occurring. Some of the miners' bodies were not recovered until 1946.

Demand for coal peaked in the late 1940s, prompting Luscar Coals Ltd. to expand its operations to include surface mining. After the introduction of diesel fuel in 1952, however, coal sales rapidly declined in Alberta. Luscar's coal mine closed in October 1956, and the settlement quickly began to depopulate. Many families relocated to Edson; properties that were not moved were torn down. Luscar's post office closed on November 30, 1956.

=== Later history: 1960–present ===
Population history of Luscar
Year	Pop.	±%
1941	620	—
1951	557	−10.2%
1956	301	−46.0%
Source: Statistics Canada

In 1967, Luscar Coals Ltd. merged with Mountain Park Collieries to form Luscar Ltd. Luscar Ltd. then became joint owners of Luscar's coal mine with the Consolidation Coal Company of Canada, and entered an agreement with Cardinal River Coals (CRC) to manage the mine. CRC re-established mining activity in 1969, but did not rebuild the Luscar townsite. In 1970, the firm's operations grew to include a coal processing and preparation plant.

CRC's mine, which produced coking coal for export to Asian steel mills, operated until 2003. Luscar Ltd. sold the mine to Elk Valley Coal Corporation that year, which maintained Luscar's coal processing plant but wound down mining in the area. The final haul of coal from Luscar's mine occurred in 2004.

Upon the re-closure of Luscar's mine, the Government of Alberta and other local stakeholders initiated a plan to manage the site and facilitate its reclamation by nature. A working group was established by 2006, consisting of bodies including the Energy Resources Conservation Board, Alberta Environment and Protected Areas, and Parks Canada. 50% of the former Luscar mine site had been reclaimed by 2011.

A coal processing plant remained active in Luscar until June 2020. The following year, an analysis of provincial data found that Luscar Creek continued to contain elevated levels of selenium, a pollutant from coal mining operations. A follow-up study in 2025 concluded that Luscar Creek still contained unsafe concentrations of selenium, as well as other pollutants. Researchers concluded that provincial regulations designed to limit pollution from Luscar's retired mines were failing.

No commercial operations remain active in Luscar. The name remains in use as a geographical toponym, and for identifying ongoing rewilding efforts in the area.

== See also ==
- List of ghost towns in Alberta
