= Hinton Transit =

- Founded: June 2007. Fully Implemented June 16th 2009
- Service area: Hinton, Alberta
- Service type: bus service
- Routes: 1
- Stops: 42 Stops
- Operator: First Canada
- Website: Hinton Transit System

Hinton Transit is the public transportation service in the town of Hinton in Alberta, Canada, located approximately 284 kilometres (176 mi) west of Edmonton along Highway 16. Bus service operates on Monday to Friday from 8:00am to 8:00pm, Saturdays from 8:00am to 6:00pm. No service is provided on Sundays or Statutory Holidays.

== History ==
A contract was awarded for an initial 18-month trial period beginning in June, 2007. The pilot project proved to be more successful than expected, and the town council approved the creation of a permanent transit system at its meeting on June 16, 2009. The contractor Cardinal Coach Lines which has since been acquired by First Canada, is responsible for providing the vehicles, drivers and maintenance.
