= Haddock, Alberta =

Locality in Canada

Coordinates: 53.814°N 115.984°W

Haddock is a locality in Yellowhead County Alberta, Canada.

The first post office opened in 1915 and was named for Maude Haddock, the first postmistress.
