= Carrot Creek, Alberta =

Carrot Creek
- Locality
- Location of Carrot Creek in Alberta
- Coordinates: 53°36′25″N 115°51′17″W
- Country: Canada
- Province: Alberta
- Census division: No. 14
- Municipal district: Yellowhead County

Government
  - Type: Unincorporated
  - Governing body: Yellowhead County Council
- Time zone: UTC-7 (MST)

Carrot Creek is an unincorporated community in central Alberta in Yellowhead County, located 1 kilometre (0.62 mi) south of Highway 16, about 41 kilometres (25 mi) east of Edson and 160 kilometres (99 mi) west of Edmonton.
