= Mercoal, Alberta =

Mercoal
- Locality
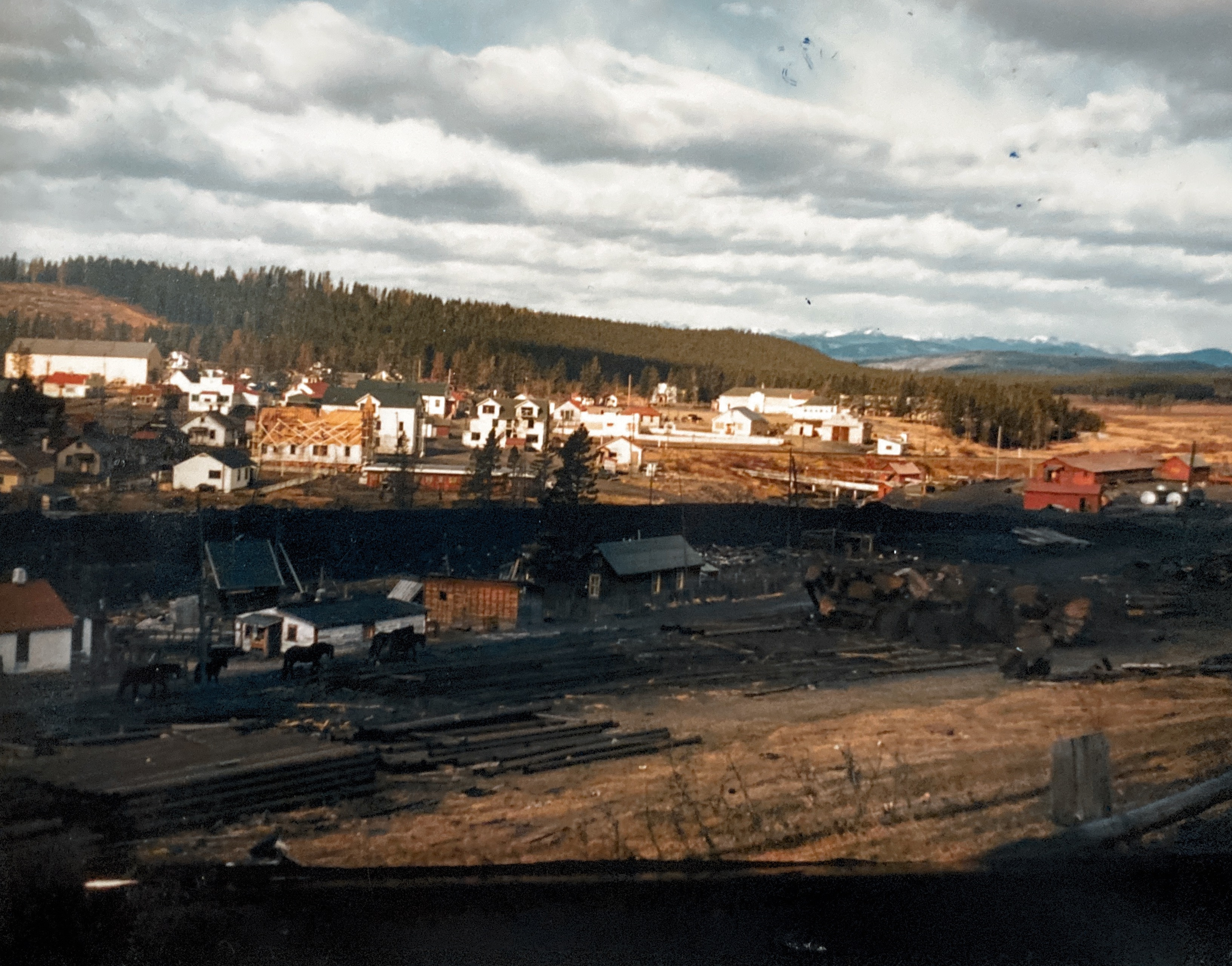
- Mercoal, shortly after mine closure, Spring 1960

- Location within Yellowhead County Location within Alberta
- Coordinates: 53°09′37″N 117°05′43″W
- Country: Canada
- Province: Alberta
- Municipal district: Yellowhead County

Government
  - Type: Unincorporated
  - Mayor: Jim Eglinski
  - Governing body: Yellowhead County Council: Shawn Brian Berry; Sandra Cherniawsky; Anthony Giezen; Dawn Mitchell; Fred Priestley-Wright; David Russell; William Velichko; Jack Williams
- Time zone: UTC−06:00 (Alberta Time)
- Area codes: 780, 587, 825

Mercoal, a former coal mining community, is a ghost town located in Yellowhead County, Alberta, Canada. Situated on Highway 40, it is located 6 km (4 mi) from Coalspur and 11 km (7 mi) from Robb.

== Toponymy ==
Mercoal is an acronym for the McLeod River Hard Coal Company, which opened a mine in the area in 1920.

== Topography ==
Mercoal's terrain is characterized by shallow valleys and gentle slopes. Its soils are predominantly clay loam, formed from glacial till, which range from poorly drained to well drained.

=== Flora and fauna ===
Plants native to the Mercoal area include evening primrose, Jacob's-ladder, northern arnica, mountain strawberry, and the common yarrow. Mercoal Creek, which borders the original townsite, is travelled by Brook trout.

== History ==
=== Founding: 1910–1920 ===
Mercoal was one of the communities created by the Grand Trunk Pacific Railway (GTPR) after 1910, when the GTPR began constructing a line from Edmonton to the British Columbia Coast. Known as the Coal Branch line, it was built to transport coal being mined in the area. The GTPR reached Mercoal in 1913.

In 1920, the McLeod River Hard Coal Company opened a mine that gave the settlement its name. Coal produced by the mine was suitable for use by Alberta's railways, and the area developed into a mining community.

=== Early development and unrest: 1921–1940 ===
Mercoal quickly became host to commercial establishments including a general store, coffeehouse, pool room, and hardware store. A post office opened in January 1922. Children in Mercoal attended a school in nearby Coalspur until Mercoal School opened to serve the growing community.

Single men who worked in the mines lived in boarding houses with a shared cookhouse and dining room. Mercoal was unusual for a Coal Branch settlement in that its demographics settled along ethnic lines, with miners from Ukraine gathering on a hill to the northeast. This was likely due to space requirements: many of these miners kept chickens or cattle, necessitating their separation from the townsite.

The McLeod River Hard Coal Company sold Mercoal's mine to the Saunders Ridge Coal Company in 1924. Forest fires that broke out in 1929 briefly threatened the settlement until summer rains wetted the grassland surrounding Mercoal, sparing it from the fire's path.

In June 1930, a dispute arose between the United Mine Workers of America (UMWA) and Mine Workers' Union of Canada (MWUC) regarding which union represented Mercoal's workers. The dispute began when the mine's owners signed an agreement with the UMWA, without consulting the miners. Supported by the MWUC, between 30 and 70 of the mine's 80 workers went on strike. Politician Christopher Pattinson suggested that a referendum should be held to allow all workers to decide which union they preferred, but the UMWA refused the proposal.

On July 23, the RCMP attended Mercoal in a bid to quell rising hostilities, and a riot erupted. The RCMP requested support from the Alberta Provincial Police, resulting in over 120 armed police officers attending Mercoal the next day. The union dispute ended with Mercoal's workers opting to join the MWUC.

=== Wartime expansion and decline: 1941–2000 ===
Canadian Collieries Ltd. acquired the mine in 1940, amid a period of rising demand for coal caused by the Second World War. At this time, Mercoal had 200 residents; its population grew to 850 by 1946. Mercoal's production increased from 500 tons a day to 1,200 by 1942. Increased mining activity generated an economic boom for Mercoal, which received a theatre, gas station, and General Motors dealership. Mercoal's name was accepted by the Government of Canada for mapping purposes in 1944.

By 1952, Mercoal's mine was the only major producer in the area, as mines in nearby Cadomin and Mountain Park closed in quick succession. Miners from surrounding areas relocated to Mercoal for work, and the community's population reached a peak of 1,000. Mercoal Hospital, an eight-bed facility, also opened that year to accommodate the growing populace. Nonetheless, demand for coal continued to decline throughout the 1950s until Mercoal's mine closed on July 17, 1959. Between the closure of mines in Mercoal and Drumheller that year, 1,200 miners were out of work, and Mercoal began to rapidly depopulate.

Population history of Mercoal
Year	Pop.	±%
1941	91	—
1951	977	+973.6%
1956	972	−0.5%
Source: Statistics Canada

In 1968, writer Robert Kroetsch described Mercoal as having a population of two. Mercoal's post office closed permanently in May of that year. A local history published in 1979 described Mercoal as "no longer on the map."

=== 21st century: 2001–present ===
Only the foundations of the original Mercoal townsite are extant in the 21st century. Mercoal is therefore often referred to as a ghost town, though the vicinity is home to some residential properties, for which Mercoal remains in use as a toponym.

The provincial government contemplated evacuating Mercoal's residents due to a winter wildfire in December 2018, though this order was ultimately aborted. Residents of Mercoal were temporarily evacuated in June 2025 during the 2025 Canadian wildfires.
