= Cadomin =

- Hamlet
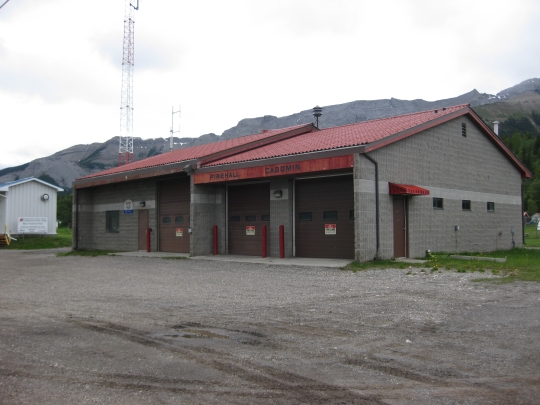
- Cadomin's fire hall in 2011

- Location within Yellowhead County Location within Alberta
- Coordinates: 53.03246°N 117.32652°W
- Country: Canada
- Province: Alberta
- Census division: 14
- Municipal district: Yellowhead County

Government
  - Type: Unincorporated
  - Mayor: Jim Eglinski
  - Governing body: Yellowhead County Council: Shawn Brian Berry; Sandra Cherniawsky; Anthony Giezen; Dawn Mitchell; Fred Priestley-Wright; David Russell; William Velichko; Jack Williams

Area (2021)
  - Land: 1.02 km^{2} (0.39 sq mi)
- Elevation: 1,520 m (4,990 ft)

Population (2021)
  - Total: 54
  - Density: 52.8/km^{2} (137/sq mi)
- Time zone: UTC−06:00 (Alberta Time)

Cadomin /ˈkædəmɪn/ is a hamlet in west-central Alberta, Canada, within Yellowhead County. It is along the McLeod River in the foothills of the Rocky Mountains, approximately 50 kilometres (31 mi) south of Hinton near the Bighorn Highway. It is served by a spur of the Canadian National Railway.

Statistics Canada recognizes Cadomin as a designated place. It is in Census Division No. 14 and in the riding of Yellowhead. It is administered by Yellowhead County.

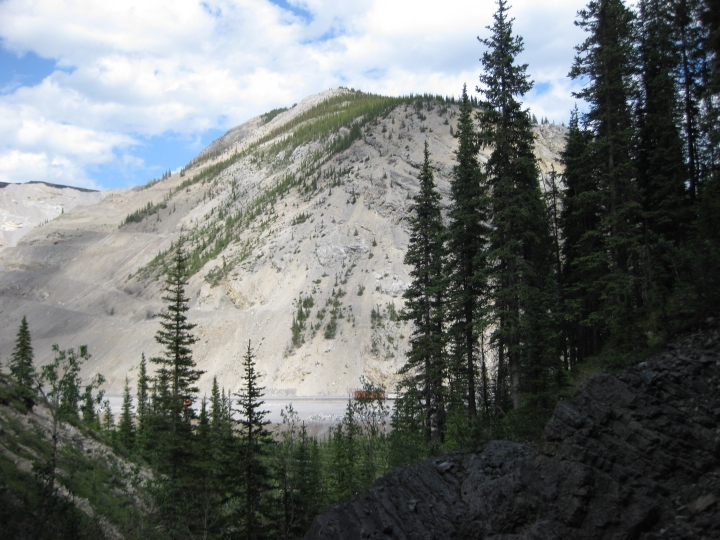
The scenery of Cadomin

== History ==
Cadomin's name is an acronym for 'Canadian Dominion Mining', and the community gives its name to the Cadomin Formation, which forms a nearby prominent outcrop.

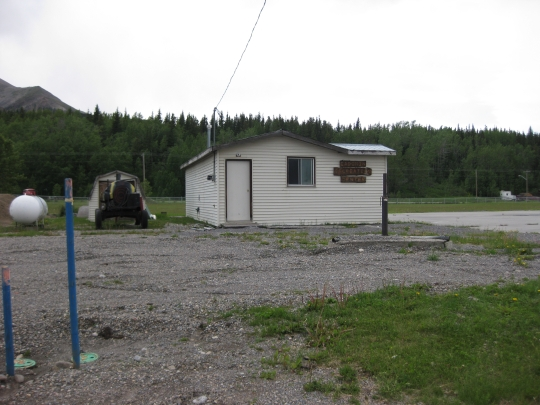
Cadomin Recreation Centre 2011

Cadomin is one of many communities in the Alberta Coal Branch area that thrived from the 1920s to the 1950s. During the early 1930s, Cadomin's population peaked at 1,800. Other Coal Branch communities included Mountain Park, Luscar, Mercoal, and farther to the east, Robb, Embarras, Coalspur, Coal Valley, Lovett, and Foothills.

Mining

The Cadomin Coal Company began operations in 1917 and four underground mines were eventually developed, as well as a surface mine that operated from 1944 to 1950. The main coal seam, called the No. 1 Seam, averaged 33 feet (10 m) in thicknesses. The strata in the area are strongly folded and faulted, and the seam is strongly inclined to overturned, so a variety of methods were employed to work it. The coal was sold primarily as steam coal for railroad use, and the Cadomin coal mines closed in 1952 due to declining markets as the railroads replaced steam locomotives with diesel.

Cadomin Quarry, operated by the Lehigh Cement Company (formerly Inland Cement), continues to employ a small number of local residents.

== Demographics ==
Population history of Cadomin
Year	Pop.	±%
1941	1,053	—
1951	947	−10.1%
1956	109	−88.5%
1961	106	−2.8%
1966	80	−24.5%
1971	109	+36.3%
1976	129	+18.3%
1981	157	+21.7%
1986	107	−31.8%
1991	86	−19.6%
1991A	87	+1.2%
1996	86	−1.1%
2001	64	−25.6%
2006	56	−12.5%
2011	36	−35.7%
2016	40	+11.1%
2021	54	+35.0%
Source: Statistics Canada

In the 2021 Census of Population conducted by Statistics Canada, Cadomin had a population of 54 living in 27 of its 93 total private dwellings, a change of 35% from its 2016 population of 40. With a land area of 1.02 km^{2} (0.39 sq mi), it had a population density of 52.9/km^{2} (137.1/sq mi) in 2021.

As a designated place in the 2016 Census of Population conducted by Statistics Canada, Cadomin had a population of 40 living in 21 of its 92 total private dwellings, a change of 11.1% from its 2011 population of 36. With a land area of 1.02 km^{2} (0.39 sq mi), it had a population density of 39.2/km^{2} (101.6/sq mi) in 2016.

== Attractions ==
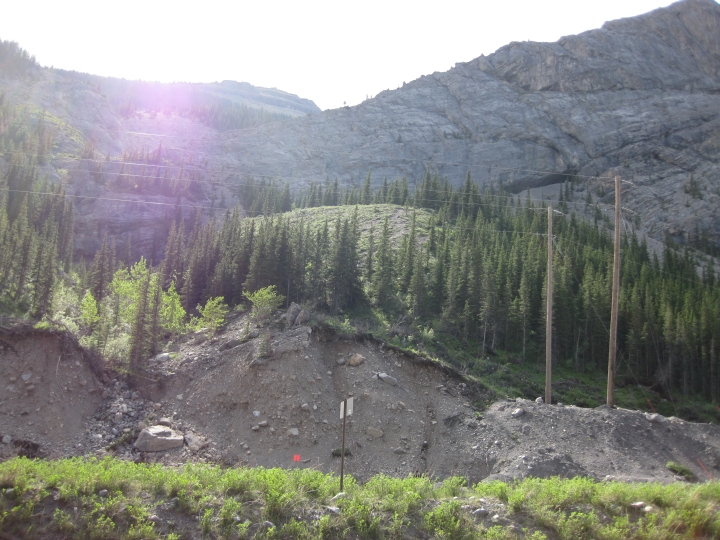
One of the many caves of Cadomin

Cadomin Cave, located several kilometres to the south, used to attract a number of tourists during the summer months, although it remains undeveloped. The caves have been closed since 2010 due to the fungus growth the bats developed.

In the area around Cadomin, there are extensive trails for horse back riding, all-terrain vehicles and dirt biking. Mountain biking is becoming increasingly popular as well. Bird watching is a popular hobby, and there are also regular butterfly counts every year.

The scientific and naturalist communities spend a great deal of time studying the extensive wildlife including bighorn sheep, grizzly bears, moose, elk, and other mountain species.

The fall provides numerous big game hunting opportunities for deer, moose and bighorn sheep.

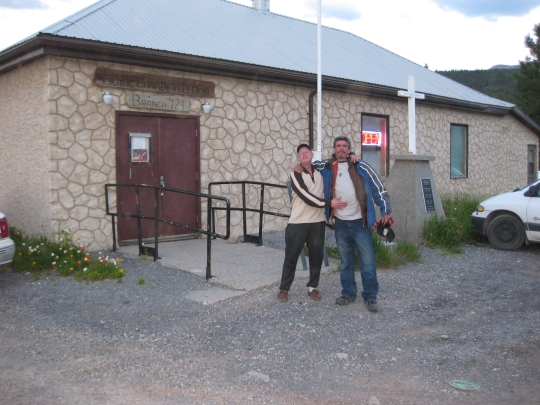
Cadomin Legion in 2011

== See also ==
- List of communities in Alberta
- List of designated places in Alberta
- List of hamlets in Alberta
