= Pine Shadows, Alberta =

Pine Shadows
- unincorporated community
- Location of Pine Shadows in Alberta
- Coordinates: 53°36′8″N 116°18′15″W
- Country: Canada
- Province: Alberta
- Census division: No. 14
- Municipal district: Yellowhead County

Government
  - Type: Unincorporated

Area (2021)
  - Land: 0.61 km^{2} (0.24 sq mi)

Population (2021)
  - Total: 127
  - Density: 208.7/km^{2} (541/sq mi)
- Time zone: UTC−06:00 (Alberta Time)

Pine Shadows is an unincorporated community in central Alberta, Canada within Yellowhead County that is recognized as a designated place by Statistics Canada. It is located 8 km (5.0 mi) east of Edson.

== Demographics ==
In the 2021 Census of Population conducted by Statistics Canada, Pine Shadows had a population of 127 living in 55 of its 60 total private dwellings, a change of −18.1% from its 2016 population of 155. With a land area of 0.61 km^{2} (0.24 sq mi), it had a population density of 208.2/km^{2} (539.2/sq mi) in 2021.

As a designated place in the 2016 Census of Population conducted by Statistics Canada, Pine Shadows had a population of 155 living in 61 of its 65 total private dwellings, a change of 2% from its 2011 population of 152. With a land area of 0.61 km^{2} (0.24 sq mi), it had a population density of 254.1/km^{2} (658.1/sq mi) in 2016.

== See also ==
- List of communities in Alberta
- List of designated places in Alberta
