= Robb, Alberta =

Robb
- Hamlet
- Motto(s): Gateway to coal branch and outdoor adventure
- Location of Robb in Alberta Robb (Canada) Robb (North America)
- Coordinates: 53.2333°N 116.9786°W
- Country: Canada
- Province: Alberta
- Census division: No. 14
- Municipal district: Yellowhead County
- Established: Celebrating 100 years June 24, 2023

Government
  - Type: Unincorporated
  - Mayor: Jim Eglinski
  - Governing body: Yellowhead County Council: Shawn Brian Berry; Sandra Cherniawsky; Anthony Giezen; Dawn Mitchell; Fred Priestley-Wright; David Russell; William Velichko; Jack Williams

Area (2021)
  - Land: 6.82 km^{2} (2.63 sq mi)
- Elevation: 1,140 m (3,740 ft)

Population (2021)
  - Total: 144
  - Density: 21.1/km^{2} (55/sq mi)
- Time zone: UTC−06:00 (Alberta Time)

Robb is a hamlet in west-central Alberta, Canada within Yellowhead County. It is located on Highway 47, approximately 53 km (33 mi) southwest of Edson. Recognized by Statistics Canada as a designated place, the hamlet is located in Census Division No. 14, in the federal riding of Yellowhead.

== Toponymy ==
Robb was likely named for Peter Addison "Baldy" Robb (1887–1955), an entrepreneur who owned several commercial holdings in Robb and Edson. Peter himself claimed the locality was named in honour of politician James Robb, though Yellowhead County deems this unlikely, considering Peter to have made the remark out of modesty.

== Topography ==
Robb is situated in the Foothills Natural Region of Alberta, at an elevation of around 1,140 m (3,740 ft). Soil in the area is predominantly luvisolic. Two bodies of water run through Robb: the Embarras River, which flows in a northerly direction, and its tributary Bryan Creek, which flows in an easterly direction.

=== Ecology ===
Robb lies within Canada's boreal forest and contains flora typical of the environment, such as the white spruce and lodgepole pine. Robb has contended with outbreaks of mountain pine beetles, which infest and ultimately kill trees.

Animals observed in Robb include elk, mule deer, black bears, bighorn sheep, and timber wolves. Bird populations include dusky grouse, rock ptarmigan, and Ross's geese.

== History ==
=== Establishment: 1912–1923 ===
After a coal mine was discovered in 1912, the Grand Trunk Pacific Railway constructed a line through the area to serve mining operations. This line, and communities along it, became collectively known as the Alberta Coal Branch.

Peter Addison Robb, a local entrepreneur, opened the Minehead Coal Company in 1918, after which the community was identified by the name Minehead for several years. In September 1922, a post office opened under the identifier Robb, likely after Peter. The settlement began to appear on maps under the name of Robb in 1923, and a coal town developed around the local mine.

=== Rise and decline of coal mining: 1924–1949 ===
During the 1925 Canadian federal election, Peter Robb and his namesake community received national attention for his conduct as a deputy returning officer for the Peace River constituency. He was accused of tampering with ballots, as well as forging and destroying ballots. While the latter charges were dropped, Peter was convicted of altering votes for Conservative candidate James Arthur Collins into votes for Liberal candidate William Archibald Rae.

Peter's wife Winifred Robb (née Edwards) subsequently assumed management of Robb's mine while her husband served a five-year term of imprisonment. Around 1927, the Minehead Coal Company sold its interest in Robb's mine to the Balcan Coal Company. Balcan, in turn, sold the mine to the Lakeside Company in 1929, just before the beginning of the Great Depression saw demand for coal fall sharply. Nonetheless, Lakeside invested in new mining machinery in 1930, and Robb's production remained steady.

In 1932, Grant McConachie landed a de Havilland Puss Moth in Robb on an improvised landing strip, earning the distinction of piloting the first aircraft in the area. McConachie crashed during take-off on his return trip to Edmonton, though he escaped without injury.

Robb's name was approved for provincial mapping purposes in 1944, and the Bryan Hotel (later renamed the Coal Branch Hotel) opened by 1948.

=== Mine closure and later development: 1950–1989 ===
Bryan School opened to serve the community in 1951. By this time, demand for Alberta's coal was beginning to dwindle, as crude oil and natural gas attracted a larger share of the energy market and Canada's railways moved to diesel. Robb's mine closed in 1957. Nearby mining towns, such as Cadomin and Mercoal, had produced substantially more coal than Robb's mine during its years of activity. While the other localities produced millions of tons of coal, Robb's mine sold 906,968 tons between 1918 and 1957.

Limited coal mining operations resumed in Robb in the 1970s. By this time, Robb's economy had primarily transitioned to forestry and accommodating recreational hunting. Energy companies began exploring ways to leverage undeveloped reserves of natural gas surrounding Robb in 1983, and the following year saw Gulf Canada open a gas processing facility in the area.

=== Hamlet of Robb: 1990–present ===
Robb was declared a hamlet by the Government of Alberta in 1990.

In April 1999, the Grande Yellowhead Regional School Division announced a $2.4 million deficit due to falling enrolment in its jurisdiction. The division began considering closing Robb's Bryan School, which had 14 students and one teacher. Although locals formed the Robb School Council Society in a bid to raise money, Bryan School closed in June that year. It was Alberta's final one-room schoolhouse still in operation. The disused building was transferred to Yellowhead County in April 2012, which put the building up for sale for $1 shortly afterwards. No buyers were found, and the building was subsequently demolished.

Robb received a historical marker in 2019 on Wop May Day, a traditional local to Edson and surrounding areas. Wop May's son, Denny May, attended the unveiling, alongside Gerald Soroka. The marker summarizes Robb's history and presents the hamlet's motto: "Gateway to the Coal Branch". Robb subsequently celebrated its centennial in 2023, with locals marking a century since the community received its name. A commemorative plaque was built to mark the event, and locals buried a time capsule.

In June 2026, Emerald Energy Technologies, a subsidiary of Tourmaline Oil, proposed building a data centre for artificial intelligence near Robb, under the name of Malachite One. The site, which would also contain a power-generation facility, was under consideration by Yellowhead County as of July 2026.

== Mountain Cree Camp ==
In 1967, Robert Smallboy, chief of the Ermineskin Cree Nation, resigned to found the Mountain Cree Camp (initially known as the Smallboy Camp) near Nordegg. Around 100 Ermineskin members joined Smallboy to form a traditionalist community not recognized as a reserve under the Indian Act.

The Mountain Cree Camp relocated to Robb in 1971. In 2019, the community of around 140 residents objected to plans by Teck Resources Ltd. to expand its nearby Cheviot Mine, fearing that pollutants from mining activity would enter the camp's drinking water. Residents continue to follow a self-sufficient lifestyle, growing crops and extracting water from nearby mountain rivers and creeks.

=== Kisiko Awasis Kiskinahamawin School ===
Shortly after the Mountain Cree Camp moved to Robb, a school opened with funding from the Government of Canada, allowing community elders to teach Cree customs and the Cree language. Enrolment peaked at 90 students during the 1980s. The federal government discontinued funding in 1997 after reassessing the camp's eligibility for support as a non-reserve community, and the school closed.

In 2005, the Government of Alberta acknowledged that it was responsible for providing access to education. A private superintendent operated the school under provincial oversight until 2009, when the Edmonton Catholic School Division agreed to take over. The arrangement, which has been renewed several times since, is set to remain in place until at least August 31, 2028. In 2025, Alberta Education announced funding for a replacement building for the school.

== Demographics ==
Population history of Robb
Year	Pop.	±%
1941	153	—
1951	291	+90.2%
1961	271	−6.9%
1966	272	+0.4%
1971	256	−5.9%
1976	211	−17.6%
1981	230	+9.0%
1986	194	−15.7%
1991	196	+1.0%
1996	174	−11.2%
2001	183	+5.2%
2006	186	+1.6%
2011	171	−8.1%
2016	170	−0.6%
2021	144	−15.3%
Source: Statistics Canada

In the 2021 Census of Population conducted by Statistics Canada, Robb had a population of 144 living in 76 of its 125 total private dwellings, a change of −15.3% from its 2016 population of 170. With a land area of 6.82 km^{2} (2.63 sq mi), it had a population density of 21.1/km^{2} (54.7/sq mi) in 2021.

As a designated place in the 2016 Census of Population conducted by Statistics Canada, Robb had a population of 170 living in 82 of its 111 total private dwellings, a change of −0.6% from its 2011 population of 171. With a land area of 6.83 km^{2} (2.64 sq mi), it had a population density of 24.9/km^{2} (64.5/sq mi) in 2016.

== Services ==
=== Services ===
Yellowhead County Fire Department maintains a fire station and waste transfer station in Robb. Through the federal Universal Broadband Fund, the county received funding in 2022 to bring high-speed internet access to Robb and similar communities.

The Canadian National Railway maintains freight services through Robb. As of 2026, Robb's train tunnel, built in 1912, is the oldest operational train tunnel in Yellowhead County.

=== Recreation ===
Robb Multiplex, which contains two sheets of curling ice, functions as Robb's community hall and event venue. The hamlet is also home to Robb Pumptrack and a public park.

== Climate ==
Climate data for Robb
Month	Jan	Feb	Mar	Apr	May	Jun	Jul	Aug	Sep	Oct	Nov	Dec	Year
Record high °C (°F)	16.7 (62.1)	19 (66)	18 (64)	28 (82)	32 (90)	32.2 (90.0)	32.2 (90.0)	32.2 (90.0)	33 (91)	27 (81)	17.8 (64.0)	15.5 (59.9)	33 (91)
Mean daily maximum °C (°F)	−2.8 (27.0)	−0.8 (30.6)	3.9 (39.0)	10.9 (51.6)	15.8 (60.4)	19.3 (66.7)	21.5 (70.7)	20.8 (69.4)	16.2 (61.2)	11.1 (52.0)	1.4 (34.5)	−2.9 (26.8)	9.5 (49.1)
Daily mean °C (°F)	−9.6 (14.7)	−7.9 (17.8)	−3.2 (26.2)	3.7 (38.7)	8.3 (46.9)	12 (54)	14.2 (57.6)	13.5 (56.3)	9.1 (48.4)	4.1 (39.4)	−4.9 (23.2)	−9.2 (15.4)	2.5 (36.5)
Mean daily minimum °C (°F)	−16.3 (2.7)	−15 (5)	−10.2 (13.6)	−3.6 (25.5)	0.7 (33.3)	4.8 (40.6)	6.9 (44.4)	6.2 (43.2)	2.1 (35.8)	−3 (27)	−11.3 (11.7)	−15.5 (4.1)	−4.5 (23.9)
Record low °C (°F)	−43 (−45)	−45.5 (−49.9)	−36.1 (−33.0)	−22.2 (−8.0)	−14.5 (5.9)	−7 (19)	−1.1 (30.0)	−7 (19)	−12.2 (10.0)	−31 (−24)	−42 (−44)	−42.2 (−44.0)	−45.5 (−49.9)
Average precipitation mm (inches)	37.7 (1.48)	22.2 (0.87)	28.2 (1.11)	28.6 (1.13)	72.7 (2.86)	95.1 (3.74)	106.6 (4.20)	93.5 (3.68)	69.5 (2.74)	31.9 (1.26)	25 (1.0)	26.5 (1.04)	637.2 (25.09)
Source: Environment Canada

== In media ==
The 2014 television series When Calls the Heart takes place in the fictional mining town of Coal Valley, which is said to be near Robb.

== See also ==
- List of communities in Alberta
- List of designated places in Alberta
- List of hamlets in Alberta
