= Yellowhead County =

Municipal district in Alberta, Canada

- Municipal district

- Location within Alberta
- Coordinates: 53°34′54″N 116°26′4″W
- Country: Canada
- Province: Alberta
- Region: Central Alberta
- Census division: 14
- Established: 1994
- Incorporated: 1994

Government
  - Mayor: Wade Williams
  - Governing body: Yellowhead County Council: Shawn Brian Berry; Sandra Cherniawsky; Anthony Giezen; Dawn Mitchell; Fred Priestley-Wright; David Russell; William Velichko; Jack Williams
  - CAO: Luc Mercier
  - Administrative office: Edson

Area (2021)
  - Land: 22,238.56 km^{2} (8,586.36 sq mi)

Population (2021)
  - Total: 10,426
  - Density: 0.5/km^{2} (1.3/sq mi)
- Time zone: UTC−06:00 (Alberta Time)
- Website: yhcounty.ca

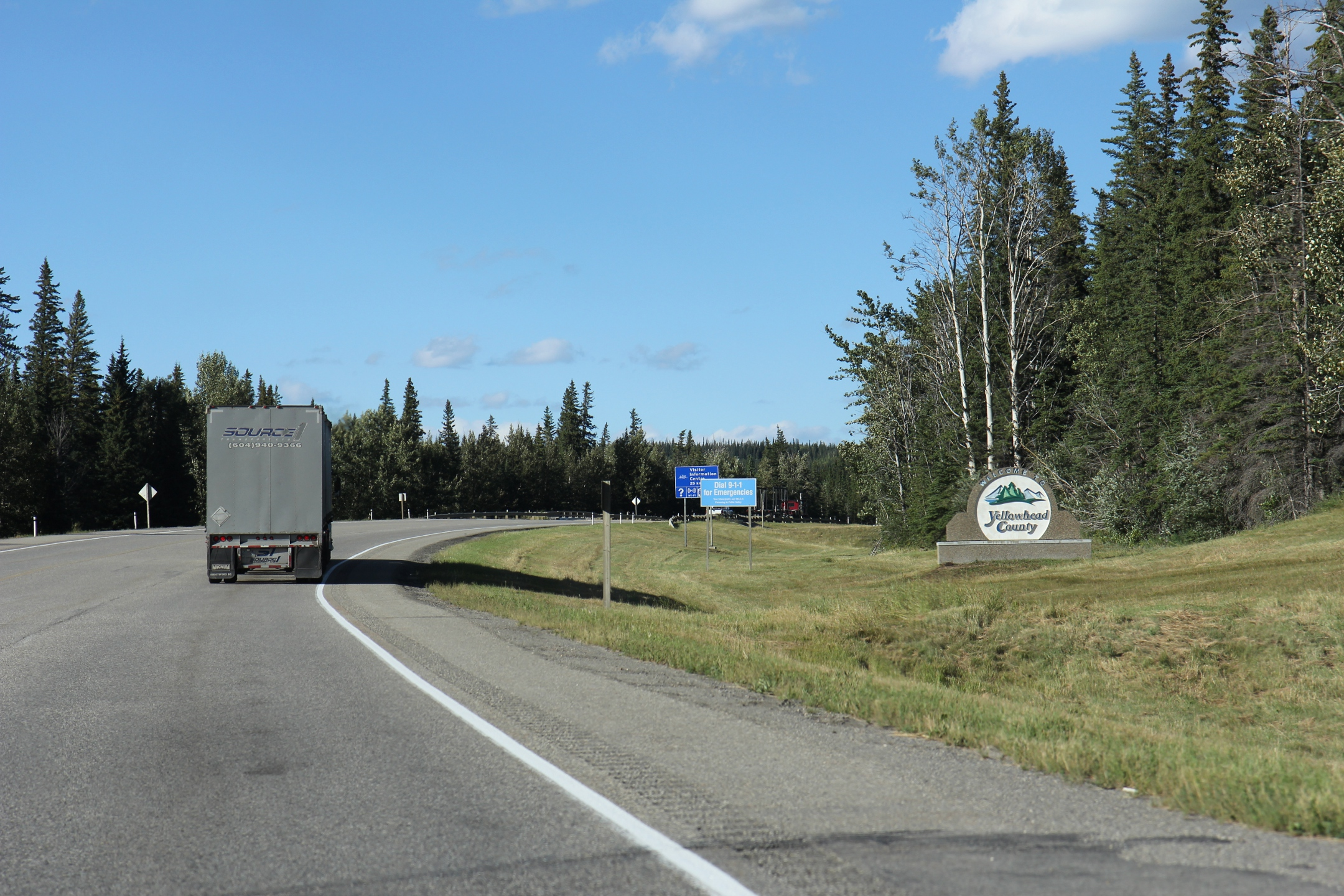
Entering Yellowhead County on the Yellowhead Highway

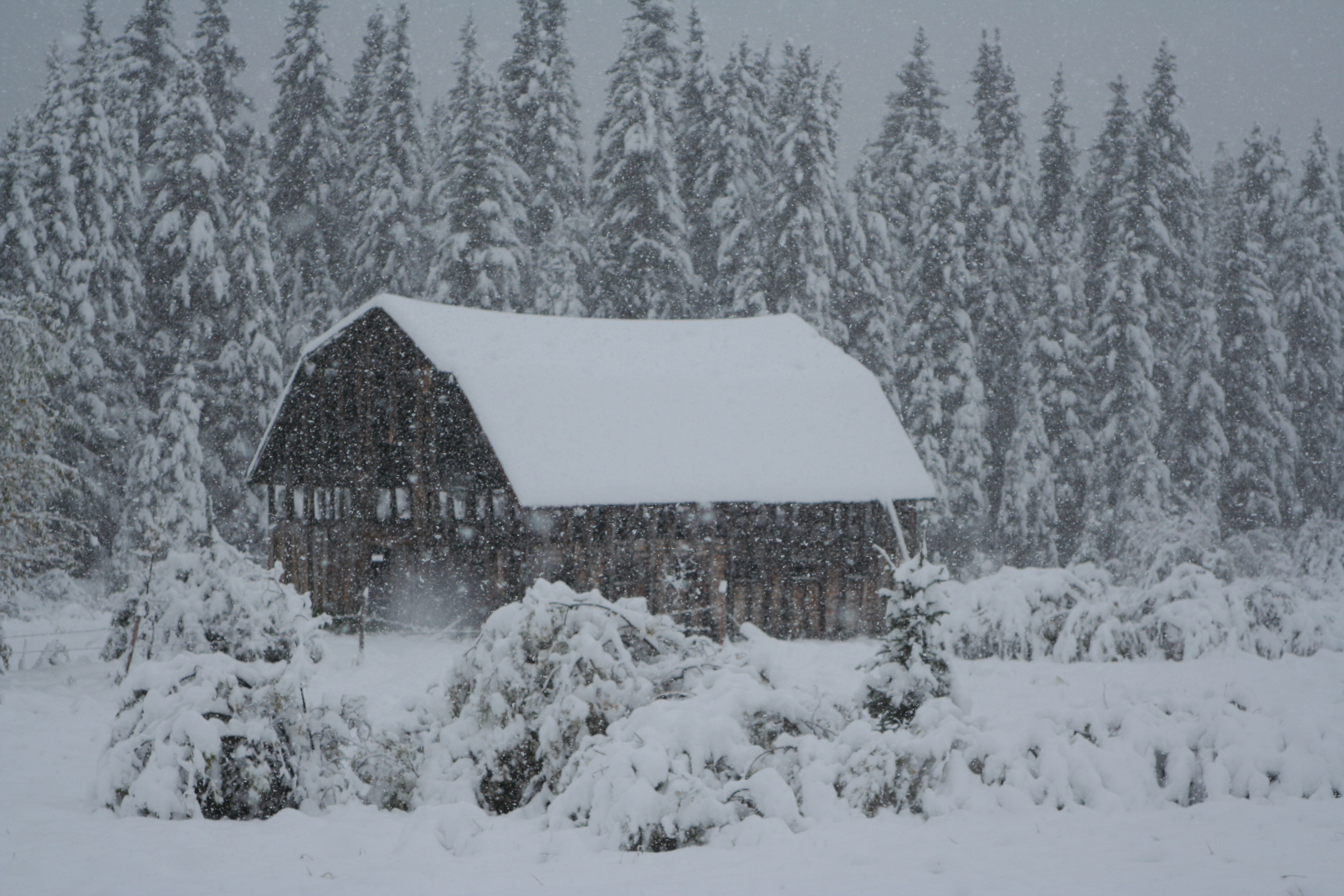
Winter at Embarras

Yellowhead County is a municipal district in west central Alberta, Canada. It is the only municipal district within Alberta census division No. 14.

== History ==
- 1994: Established as a Municipal District of Yellowhead No. 94 on January 1.
- 1998: The name changed to Yellowhead County on July 8.
- 1998: Evansburg dissolved as a village, and became part of Yellowhead Municipal District on June 30.

== Geography ==
=== Communities and localities ===
The following urban municipalities are surrounded by Yellowhead County.

Cities

- none

Towns

- Edson
- Hinton

Villages

- none

Summer villages

- none

The following hamlets are located within Yellowhead County.

Hamlets

- Brule
- Cadomin
- Evansburg
- Marlboro
- Niton Junction
- Peers
- Robb
- Wildwood

The following localities are located within Yellowhead County.

Localities

- Ansell
- Balkan
- Basing
- Bickerdike
- Branch Inn Trailer Court
- Brule Mines
- Brûlé Mines
- Bryan
- Calvert
- Carrot Creek
- Chip Lake
- Coal Valley
- Coalspur
- Dalehurst
- Diss
- Drinnan
- Embarras
- Entrance
- Erith
- Erith Tie
- Fidler
- Foothills
- Galloway
- Granada
- Grave Flats
- Gregg Subdivision
- Haddock
- Hanlon
- Hansonville
- Hargwen
- Hattonford
- Hoff
- Holloway
- Hornbeck
- Kaydee
- Leaman
- Leyland
- Lobstick
- Lovettville
- Luscar
- MacKay (held hamlet designation from 1979 to 2019)
- Mahaska
- Matthews Crossing
- McLeod River
- McLeod Valley
- Medicine Lodge
- Mercoal
- Mountain Park
- Mountain View Estates
- Niton
- Nojack or No Jack
- Northville
- Obed
- Oke
- Old Entrance
- Park Court
- Pedley
- Pembina Forks
- Pine Dale Subdivision
- Pine Shadows
- Pinedale (held hamlet designation from 1987 to 2019)
- Pinedale Estates
- Pioneer
- Rangeton
- Ravine
- Reco
- Rosevear
- Shaw
- Shining Bank
- Solomon
- Steeper
- Sterco
- Styal
- Swan Landing
- Trade Winds Trailer Court
- Two Rivers Estates
- Weald
- Wild Hay
- Wolf Creek
- Yates

The former Village of Tollerton is also located in Yellowhead County.

== Demographics ==
In the 2021 Census of Population conducted by Statistics Canada, Yellowhead County had a population of 10,426 living in 4,160 of its 4,859 total private dwellings, a change of −5.2% from its 2016 population of 10,995. With a land area of 22,238.56 km^{2} (8,586.36 sq mi), it had a population density of 0.5/km^{2} (1.2/sq mi) in 2021.

In the 2016 Census of Population conducted by Statistics Canada, Yellowhead County had a population of 10,995 living in 4,309 of its 5,048 total private dwellings, a 5% change from its 2011 population of 10,469. With a land area of 22,293.16 km^{2} (8,607.44 sq mi), it had a population density of 0.5/km^{2} (1.3/sq mi) in 2016.

== See also ==
- List of communities in Alberta
- List of municipal districts in Alberta
