= Coalspur, Alberta =

Coalspur
- Locality
- Location within Yellowhead County Location within Alberta
- Coordinates: 53°10′58″N 117°00′58″W
- Country: Canada
- Province: Alberta
- Municipal district: Yellowhead County

Government
  - Type: Unincorporated
  - Mayor: Jim Eglinski
  - Governing body: Yellowhead County Council: Shawn Brian Berry; Sandra Cherniawsky; Anthony Giezen; Dawn Mitchell; Fred Priestley-Wright; David Russell; William Velichko; Jack Williams
- Time zone: UTC−7 (MST)
  - Summer (DST): UTC−6 (MDT)
- Area codes: 780, 587, 825

Coalspur is a nearly abandoned coal-mining and railroad town in Yellowhead County, Alberta. It is situated on Highway 47 beside the Embarras River in the foothills of the Canadian Rockies.

== History ==
Population history of Coalspur
Year	Pop.	±%
1941	88	—
1951	133	+51.1%
Source: Statistics Canada

Coalspur was established during the construction of the Alberta Coal Branch, a spur line of the Grand Trunk Pacific Railway (later the Canadian National Railway) during 1911–1912. Located where the east and west lines diverged, it was home to the railroad construction camp and became a transport hub with a roundhouse and repair shops. It later became the headquarters for the Brazeau Forest Reserve and the Alberta Provincial Police.

Soon after the railroad arrived in 1912, a group of British financiers founded the Yellowhead Pass Coal and Coke Company. The original Yellowhead Mine near Coalspur employed 70 men, produced 500 tons of coal per day, and sustained the small community. At the peak of production the mine employed 400 men. A massive underground fire occurred in 1915 and again in 1922. The mine closed in 1923, although other mines in the area continued to operate until the 1950s.

One of the earliest oil wells in the central Alberta foothills was drilled near Coalspur. In 1924 Imperial Oil sank a test well near the community, and discovered a significant flow of natural gas that was used to heat boilers in the mining camp. No commercial quantity of petroleum was found however, and drilling ceased near Coalspur, although several natural gas fields were later discovered in the Coal Branch area.

The population throughout the Coal Branch area declined during the 1950s as the railroads replaced steam locomotives with diesel, and the mines closed due to lack of markets. The Coalspur post office, which opened in 1914, closed in 1963. As of 2001, the community was home to a dozen or so residents.
