= Mountain Park, Alberta =

Ghost town in Alberta, Canada

Coordinates: 52°55′49″N 117°16′21″W

Location of Mountain Park Alberta

Mountain Park is a ghost town in western Alberta, south of Cadomin, elevation 6200 feet, at the end of the historic Alberta Coal Branch line of the Canadian National Railway (originally the Grand Trunk Pacific Railway).

The road into Mountain Park - an early colour photo

Production of steam coal for railroad use by the Mountain Park Coal Co. Ltd. began in 1912 or 1914. It closed in 1950 in response to rising debt, declining coal markets, and a flood by the McLeod River that washed out the railroad bed. Mining throughout the area ceased as the railroads replaced steam locomotives with diesel, and the town was quickly abandoned. Almost nothing remains of Mountain Park today, except for a restored cemetery and a few remnants of the mine. At its peak, the town was home to about 1,500 residents.

Mountain Park was the site of another coal mining operation, the Cheviot Mine, which opened in 2005 despite environmental opposition. Cheviot was operated by Teck Coal Ltd. and produced coking coal for export to Japanese steel mills. It closed in 2020 due to declining coal reserves.
