= Lesser Slave River =

Watercourse in Alberta, Canada

Coordinates: 55°09′59″N 114°03′31″W

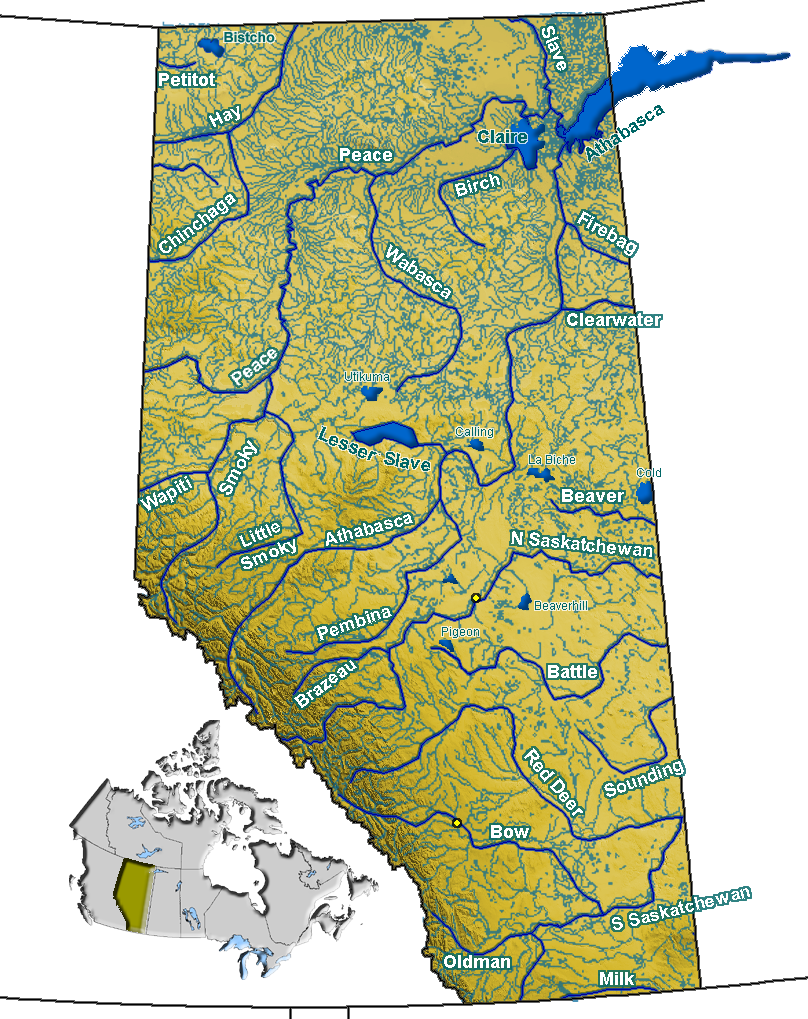
Lesser Slave River in Alberta

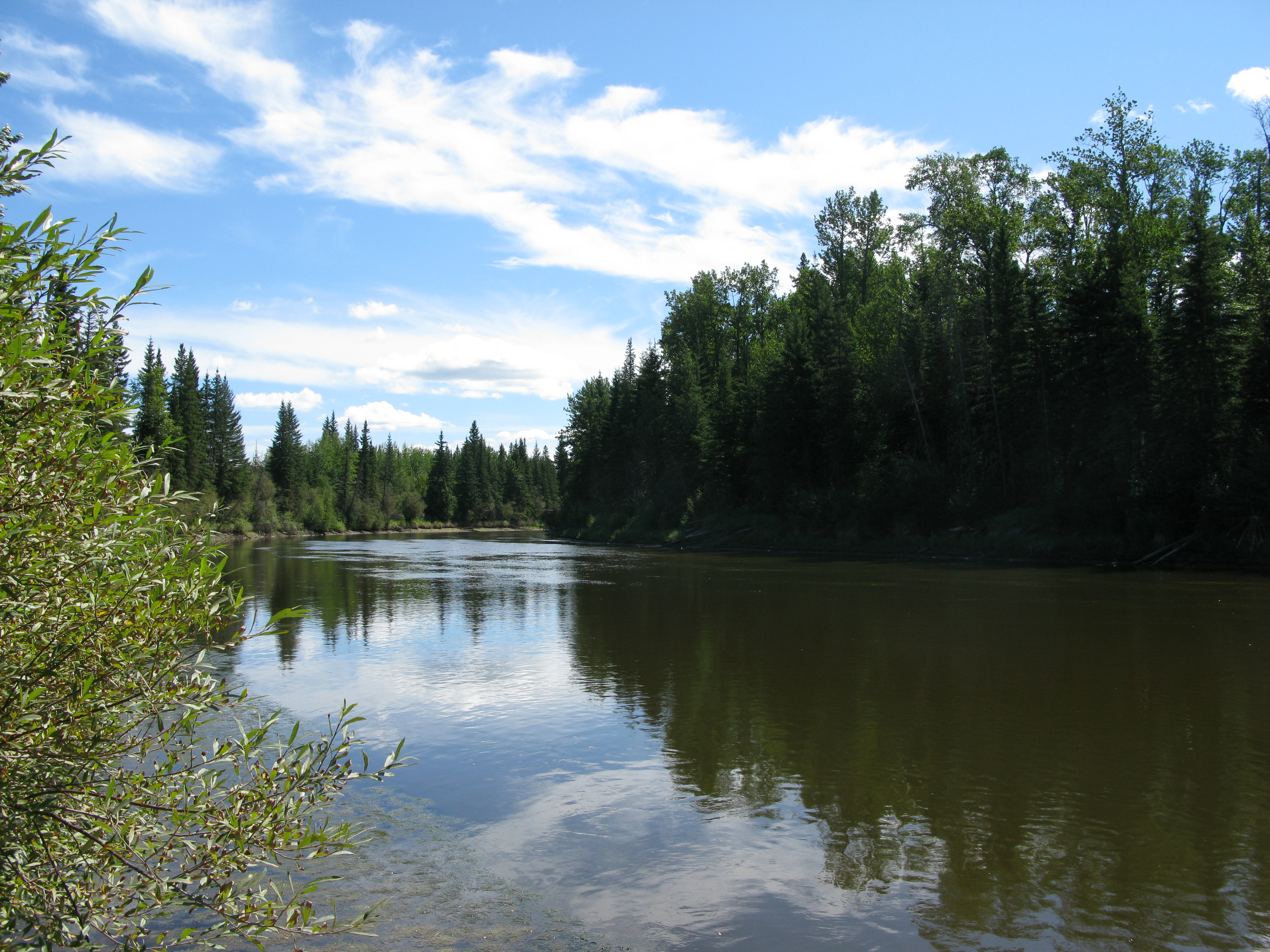
The Lesser Slave River

The Lesser Slave River (Cree Iyaghchi Eennu Sepe, translation: "River of the Strange People") is a river in central Alberta, Canada. It is a major tributary of the Athabasca River.

The Lesser Slave Lake and the river were the main links to the Peace River district until the beginning of the 20th century, when the construction of the Northern Alberta Railway facilitated transportation in the area.

== Course ==
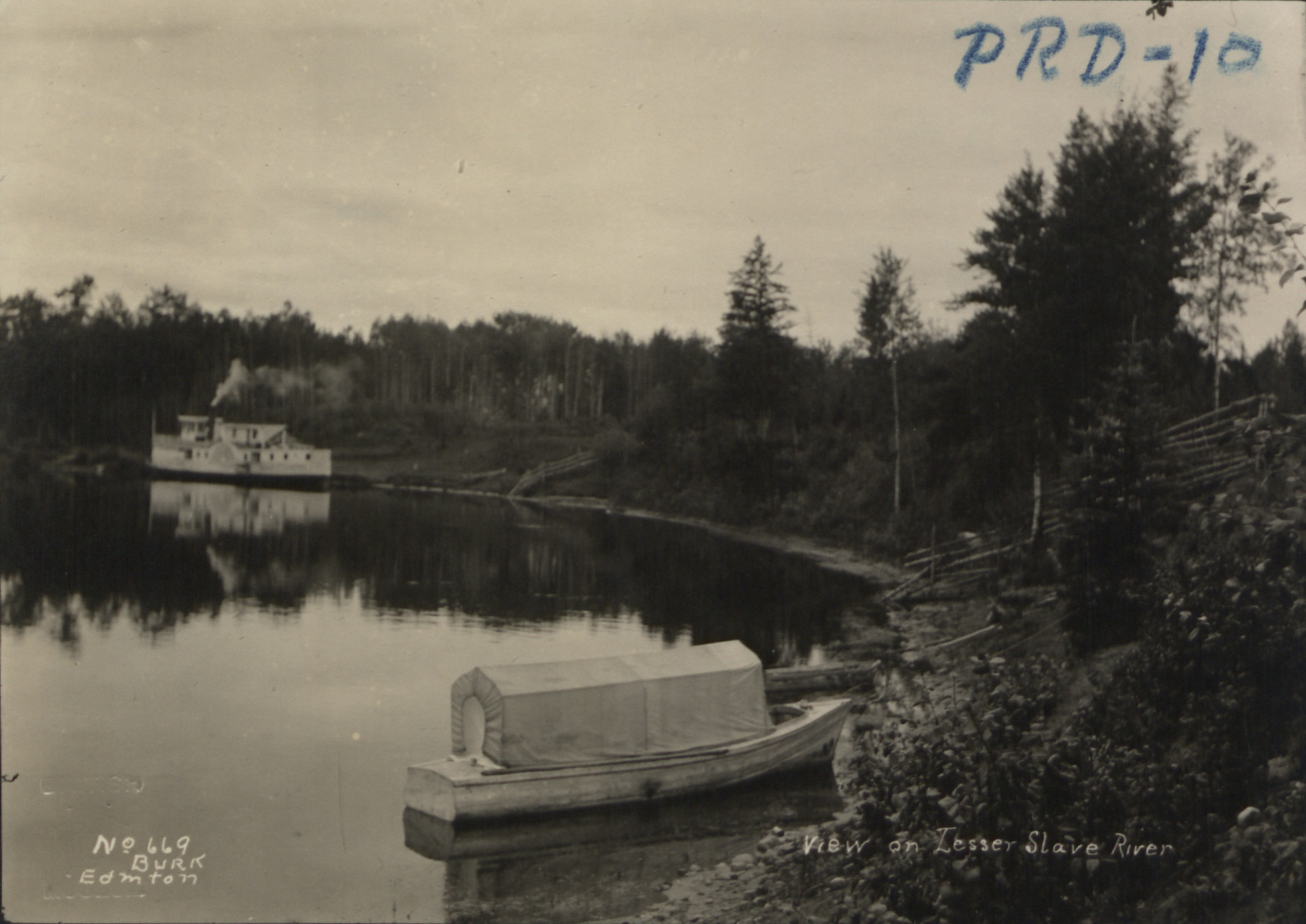
View of the Lesser Slave River, 1911

The river originates from the Lesser Slave Lake at the town of Slave Lake. The average discharge at the mouth of the lake is 20 m³/s. It flows eastwards for 61 km, and merges with the Athabasca River at the village of Smith. From its headwaters of South Heart River, it has a total length of more than 280 km.

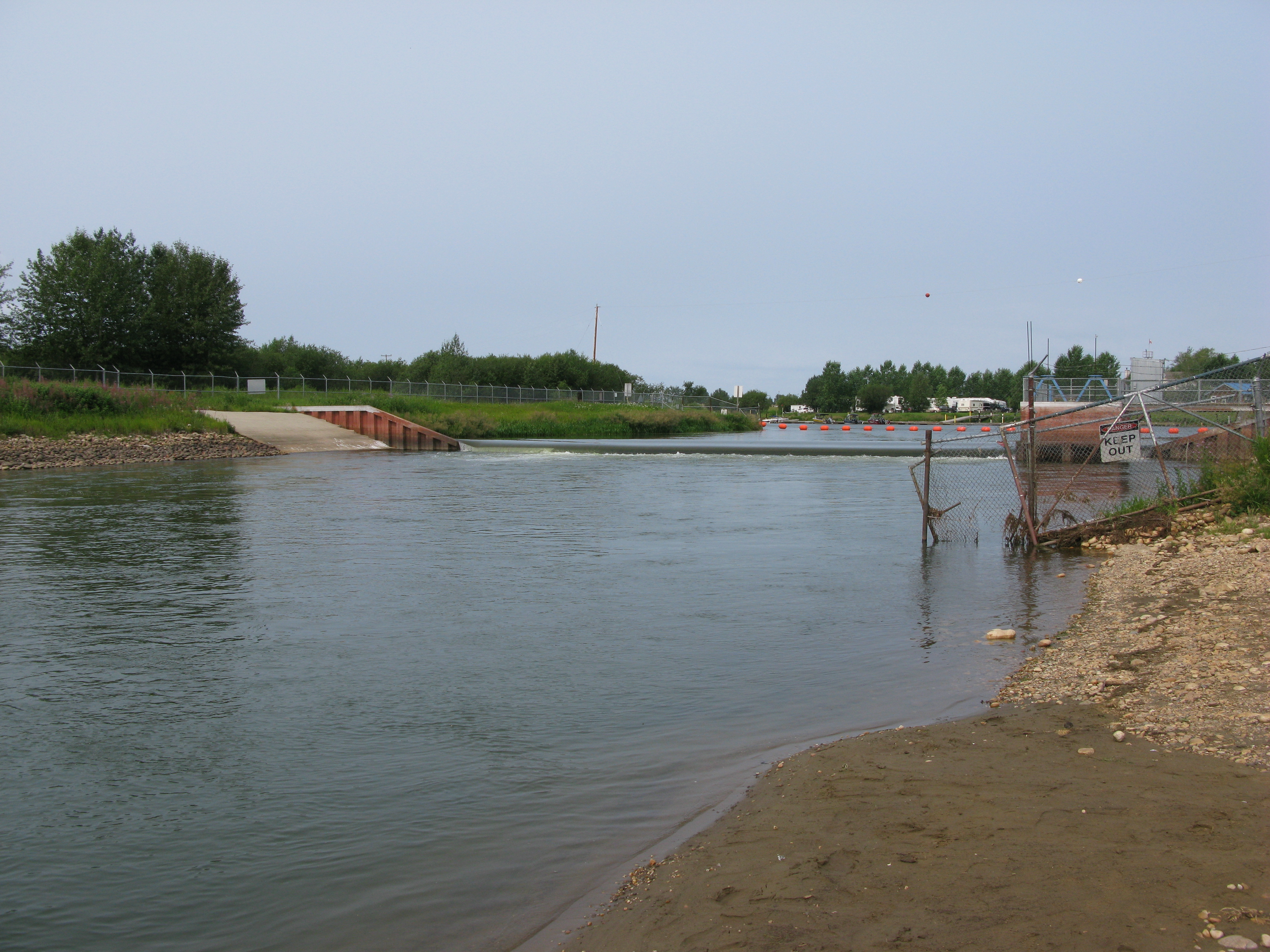
The weir on the Lesser Slave River

== Tributaries ==
Through Lesser Slave Lake

- Assineau River
- Driftpile River
  - Little Driftpile River
- South Heart River
  - East Prairie River, West Prairie River, North Heart River
- Marten River
- Swan River
  - Inverness River, Moosehorn River

Downstream of Lesser Slave Lake

- Sawridge Creek
- Eating Creek
- Mitsue Creek
  - Mitsue Lake, Florida Creek
- Muskeg Creek
- Otauwau River
- Saulteaux River
  - Coutts River
- Driftwood River
  - Fawcett River

== See also ==
- Geography of Alberta
- List of Alberta rivers
