= Jackpine River =

River in Alberta, Canada

Location
- Country: Canada
- Province: Alberta

Physical characteristics
- Source
  - location: Jackpine Pass
  - coordinates: 53°22′13″N 119°27′14″W
  - elevation: 1,726 m (5,663 ft)
- Mouth
  - location: Smoky River
  - coordinates: 53°41′13″N 119°25′09″W
  - elevation: 1,076 m (3,530 ft)

The Jackpine River is an early tributary of the Smoky River. It forms in the Canadian Rockies, within Willmore Wilderness Park, in the province of Alberta, north of Jasper National Park. The river collects the runoff from Resthaven Mountain, Barricade Mountain, Jackpine Mountain, Mount Holmes, Perseverance Mountain, and Draco Peak.

Major tributaries of the Jackpine include Meadowland Creek, Ptarmigan Lake, Avalanche Creek, Beaverdam Creek, and Pauline Creek.

The river, as well the nearby Jackpine Pass and Jackpine Mountain, are named after the Jack Pine, a pine tree dominant in the area.

== See also ==
- List of Alberta rivers
