= Benjamin Creek =

Stream in Alberta, Canada

Coordinates: 51.5338889°N 115.0644444°W

Benjamin Creek is a stream in Alberta, Canada. It is a tributary of Fallentimber Creek.

Benjamin Creek has the name of Jonas Benjamin, a Stoney tribal leader.

== See also ==
- List of rivers of Alberta
