= Drywood Creek =

Stream in Alberta, Canada

Coordinates: 49.29996°N 113.68521°W

Drywood Creek is a stream in Alberta, Canada.

Drywood Creek's name comes from the Indians of the area.

== See also ==
- List of rivers of Alberta
