= Fawcett River =

Stream in Alberta, Canada

Coordinates: 55.25016°N 114.23551°W

Fawcett River is a stream in Alberta, Canada.

Fawcett River has the name of S. D. Fawcett, a government surveyor.

== See also ==
- List of rivers of Alberta
