= Clouston Creek =

Stream in Alberta, Canada

Coordinates: 55.48337°N 117.2859°W

Clouston Creek is a stream in Alberta, Canada.

Clouston Creek has the name of N. S. Clouston, member of a surveying party.

== See also ==
- List of rivers of Alberta
