= Edwin Creek =

Stream in Alberta, Canada

Coordinates: 56.71693°N 110.385°W

Edwin Creek is a stream in Alberta, Canada.

Edwin Creek has the name of Edwin Gay, a surveyor.

== See also ==
- List of rivers of Alberta
