= Bad Heart River =

River in Canada

Location
- Country: Canada
- Province: Alberta

Physical characteristics
- Source
  - location: Saddle Hills
  - coordinates: 55.48250°N 118.76667°W
  - elevation: 930 m (3,050 ft)
- Mouth
  - elevation: 435 m (1,427 ft)

Basin features
- Tributaries
  - left: Kakut Creek

The Bad Heart River is a short river in northern Alberta, Canada. It is a tributary of the Smoky River.

Bad Heart River's name is an accurate preservation of its native Cree-language name, maatsiti.

It originates in Saddle Hills County of the Peace River Country, north of Sexsmith and south of Rycroft, at an elevation of 930 metres (3,050 ft). After descending the slopes of the Saddle Hills, it is crossed by Highway 2, then flows north-eastward. After being crossed by Highway 733, it continues eastward, receives the waters of Kakut Creek, then flows through a 150-metre (490 ft) deep canyon and empties into the Smoky River at an elevation of 435 metres (1,427 ft).

== Tributaries ==
- Kakut Creek

== See also ==
- Geography of Alberta
- List of Alberta rivers
