= Alexandra River (Alberta) =

River in Alberta, Canada

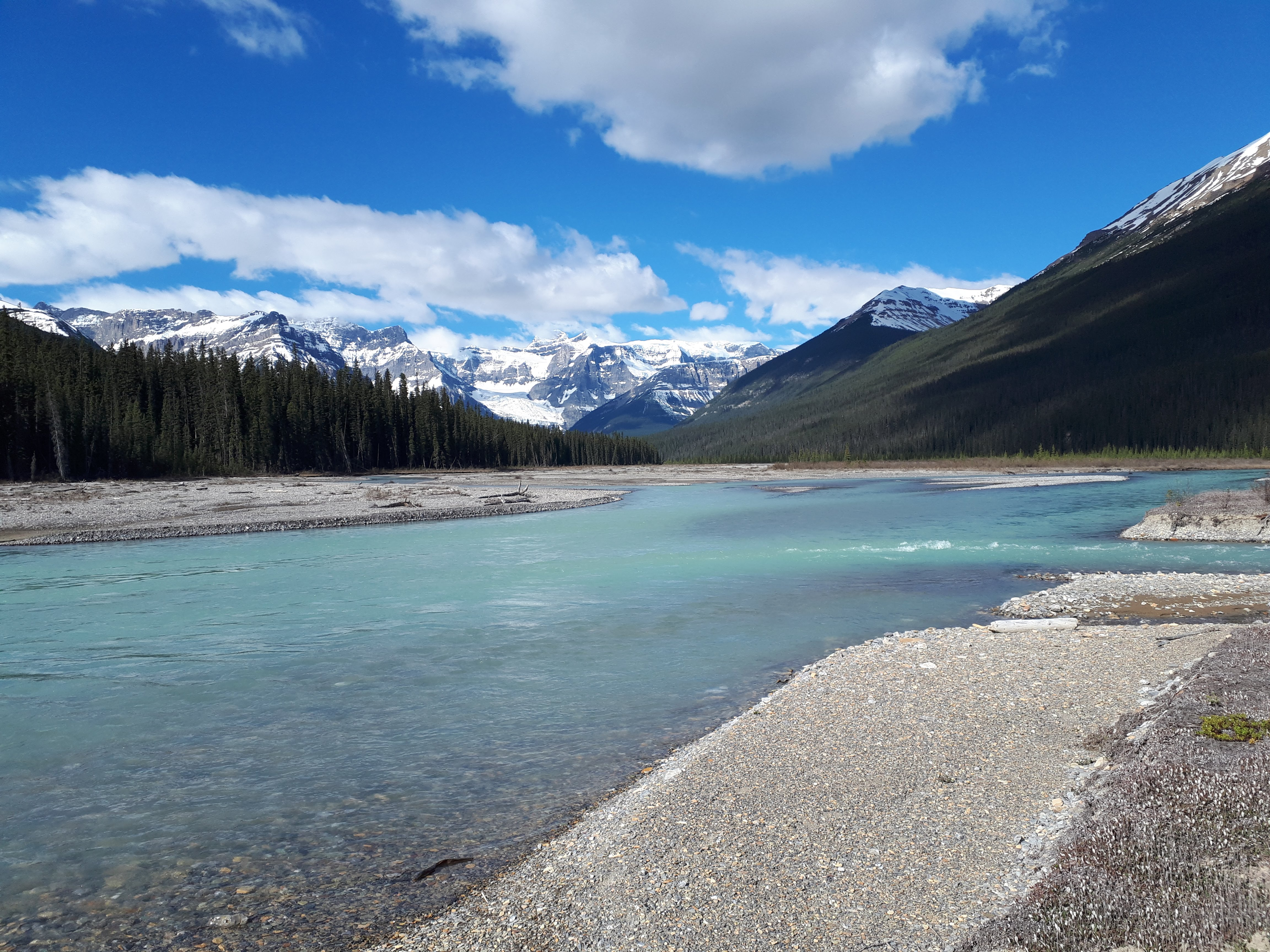
- The Alexandra River near its confluence with Terrace Creek in Banff National Park

Location
- Country: Canada
- Province: Alberta

Physical characteristics
- Source: Unnamed lake
  - coordinates: 52°00′17.4″N 117°08′10.12″W
- Mouth: North Saskatchewan River at Grave Flats
  - coordinates: 52°03′59.5″N 116°55′37″W
- Length: 20 km (12 mi)

Basin features
- Tributaries
  - left: Castleguard River, Terrace Creek,
  - right: Ridges Creek, Amery Creek

The Alexandra River is a tributary of the North Saskatchewan River in Alberta, Canada. Its source is an unnamed lake at 1,563 metres (5,128 ft) of elevation, which is fed by the Alexandra Glacier. From there it flows for about 20 kilometres (12 mi) through a remote valley until it reaches its mouth at the North Saskatchewan River.

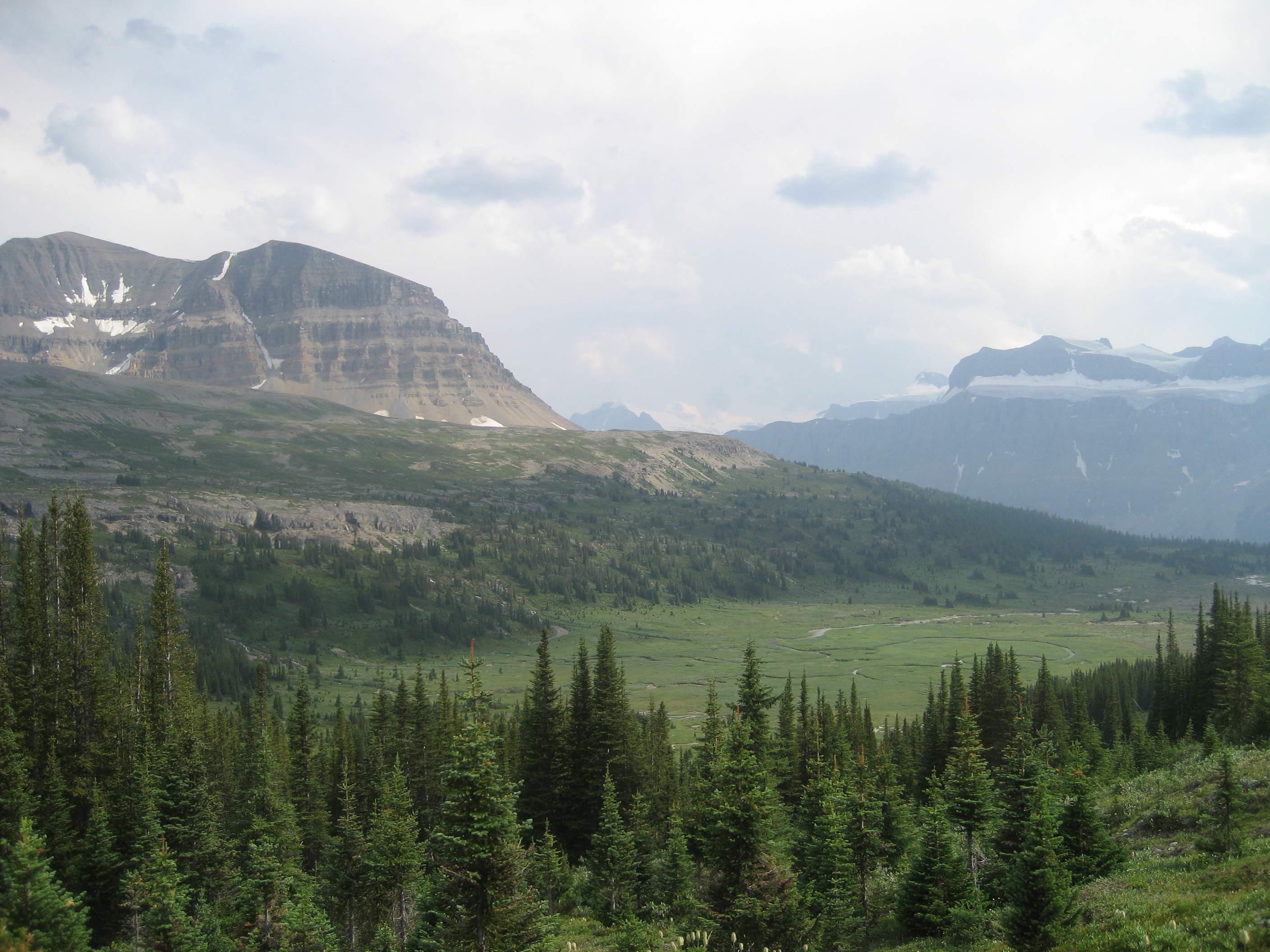
Looking down over Castleguard meadows, north of the Alexandra valley.

A decommissioned Parks Canada access road follows the north bank upstream until the river's confluence with the Castleguard River, allowing foot access to the Castleguard Meadows, a revered but seldom-visited hiking destination. The trail is no longer maintained and most bridges have decayed or been removed, making the two days of travel to the meadows very challenging. In addition, Castleguard Cave is accessible from the upper reaches of the trail.

Other major tributaries of the river include Ridges Creek, Terrace Creek, and Amery Creek.

== See also ==
- List of rivers of Alberta
