= Ells River =

Stream in Alberta, Canada

Coordinates: 57.30022°N 111.66856°W

Ells River is a stream in Alberta, Canada.

Ells River has the name of S. C. Ells, a geologist.

== See also ==
- List of rivers of Alberta
