= Fallentimber Creek =

Stream in Alberta, Canada

Coordinates: 51.7501°N 114.65202°W

Fallentimber Creek (Numbered E3-129) is a stream in Alberta, Canada. It area is of 66 acres.

Fallentimber Creek's name is an accurate preservation of its native Cree Indian name.

It has 314 Wildlife Management Units. Its restrictions include: Day use only. No open fires. Foot access only. Obtain landowner permission to access private lands.

Wildlife in this Creek include brown trout, brook trout and mountain whitefish.

== See also ==
- List of rivers of Alberta
