= Brazeau River =

River in Alberta, Canada

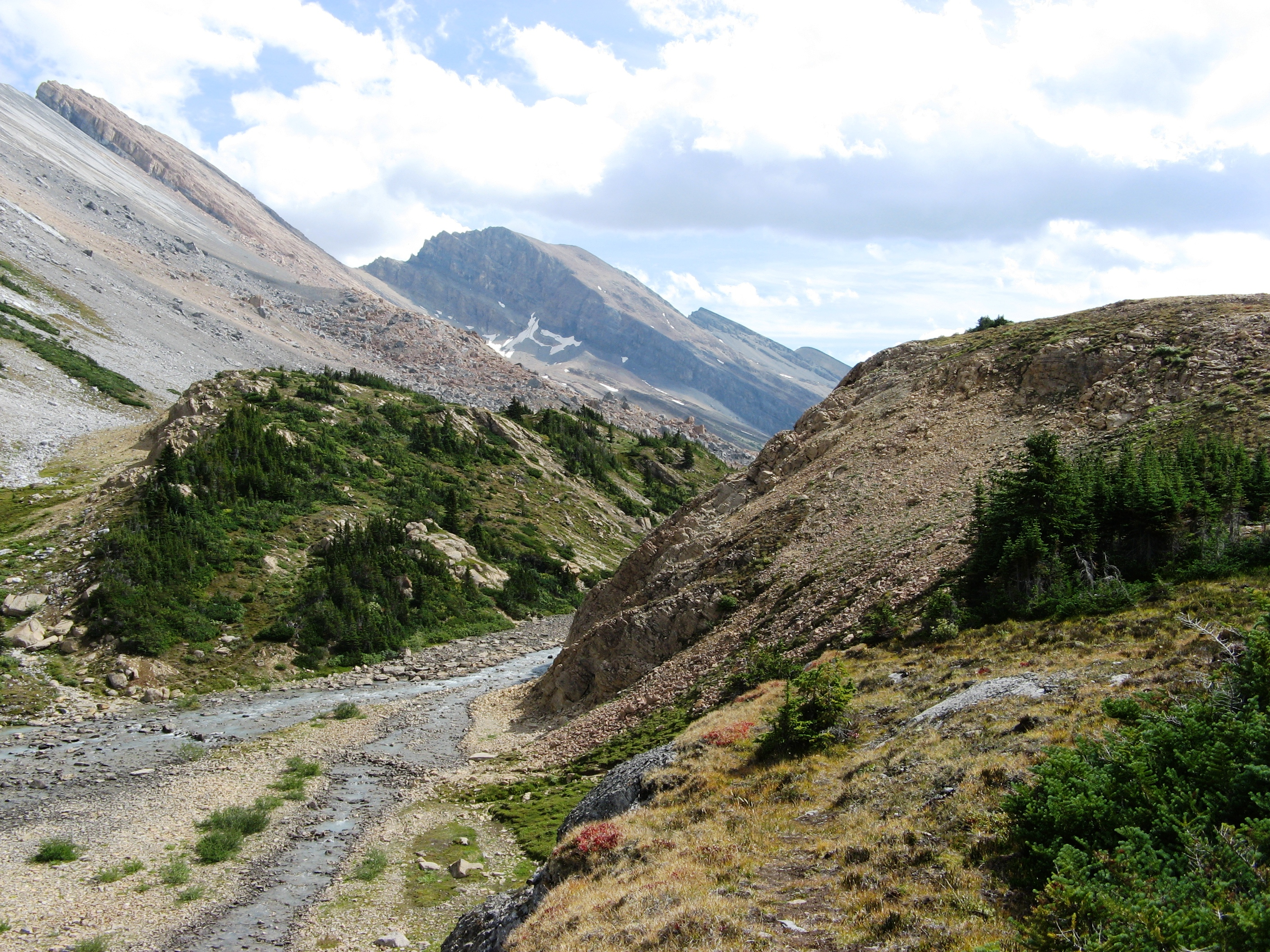
- The Brazeau River in Jasper National Park

Location
- Country: Canada
- Province: Alberta

Physical characteristics
- Source
  - location: Cataract Pass
  - coordinates: 52°13′57″N 117°03′38″W
  - elevation: 2,240 m (7,350 ft)
- Mouth
  - location: North Saskatchewan River
  - coordinates: 52°55′03″N 115°13′45″W
  - elevation: 820 m (2,690 ft)
- Length: 210 km (130 mi)

The Brazeau River is a river in western Alberta, Canada. It is a major tributary of the North Saskatchewan River.

The river was named for Joseph Brazeau, a linguist associated with the Palliser Expedition.

== Course ==
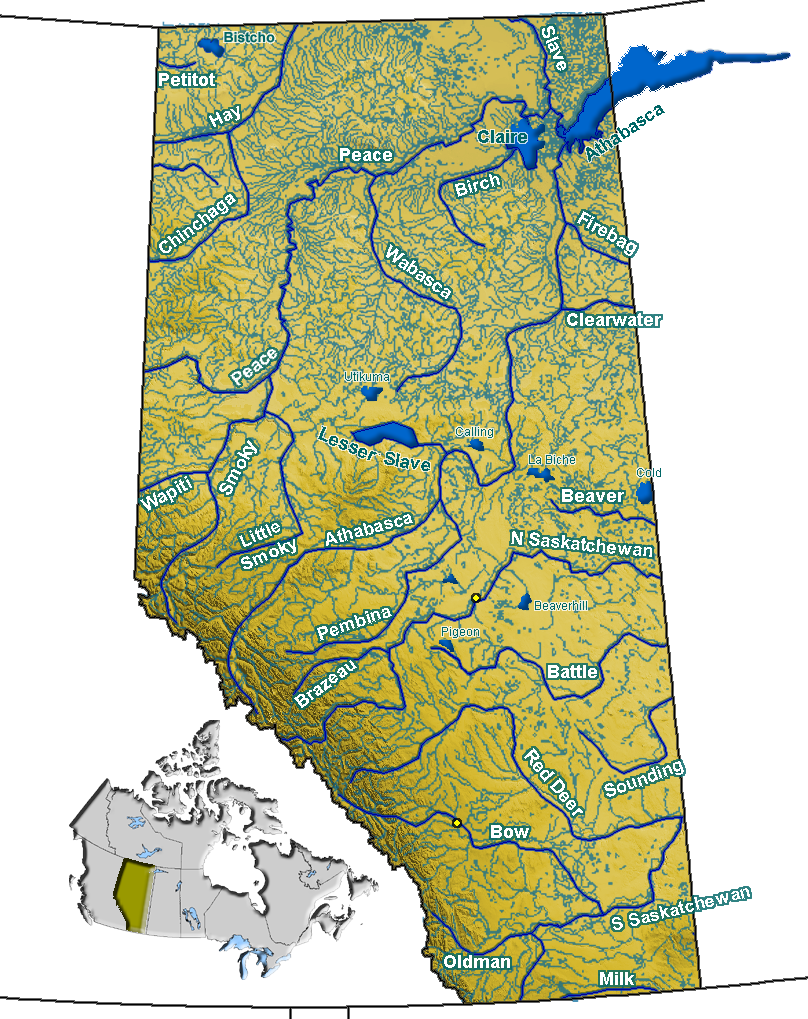

The river originates in the heights of the Canadian Rockies from Cataract Pass on the south boundary of Jasper National Park. It flows northeast into Brazeau Canyon Wildland Provincial Park. The O'Chiese First Nation is established at the confluence with Nordegg River. It merges into the North Saskatchewan River between Drayton Valley and Rocky Mountain House at Brazeau Forks.

The total length of the river is 210 kilometres (130 mi). The river, and various other local geographic features, were named after Joseph Brazeau, a Missouri-born fur trader working for the Hudson's Bay Company in the area between 1852 and 1864.

== Hydroelectric development ==
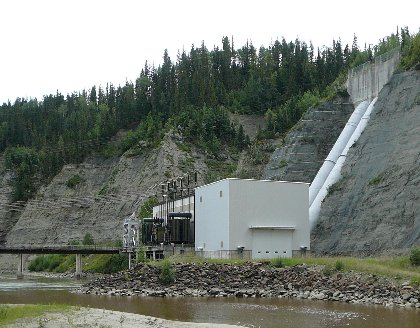
The Brazeau Dam Power Plant

The Brazeau River has long been seen as a potential site for hydroelectric power generation. The earliest scheme to harness the power of the river was hatched in 1913 and involved a dam and storage on Brazeau Lake. The potential power generation was estimated at 5,000 to 10,000 kilovolt-amperes, and power would have been transmitted to Edmonton and Calgary, both roughly 400 kilometres (250 mi) from the generator (this was a relatively ambitious plan: long-distance transmission was not common at the time). The plan was scuttled after the discovery of a large underflow at Brazeau Lake, precluding its use as a storage facility.

The 99-square-kilometre (38 sq mi) Brazeau Reservoir was created on the lower course through the construction of the Brazeau Dam. Its hydroelectric power plant is Alberta's largest, with a capacity of 355 megawatts and an annual production of about 394,000 megawatt hours of electrical energy.

An unusual feature of this hydroelectric development, commissioned in 1965, is a pump system capable of lifting water from the reservoir into the 20-kilometre (12 mi) long canal leading to the power plant so that it can operate at low reservoir water levels.

== Tributaries ==
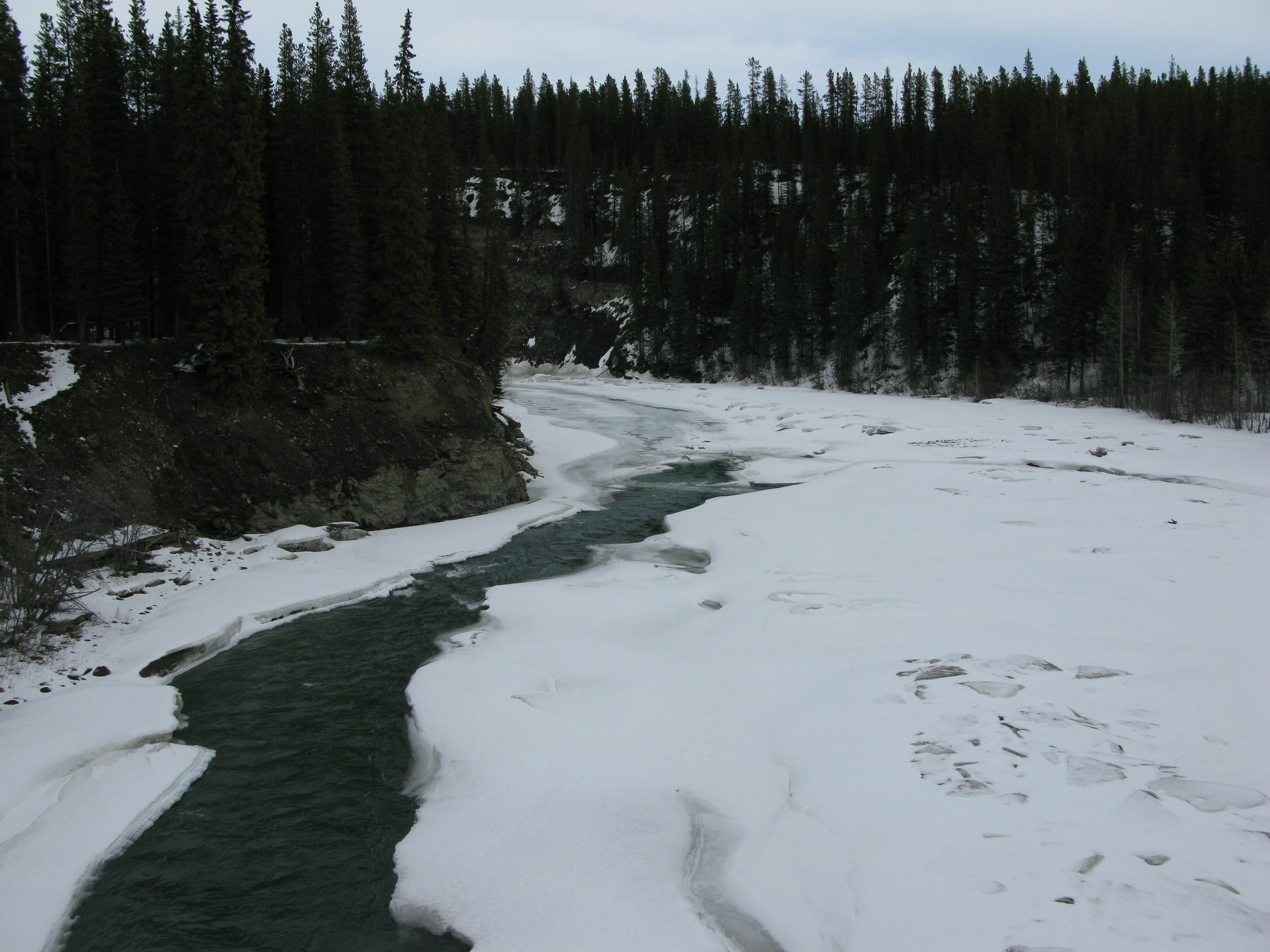
The Brazeau from Alberta Highway 40

- Boulder Creek
- Four Point Creek
- Brazeau Lake
  - John-John Creek
- Upper Longview Lake
- Job Creek
  - Whisker Creek, Whisker Lakes, Job Lake, Leah Lake, Samson Lake
- Isaac Creek
- Race Creek

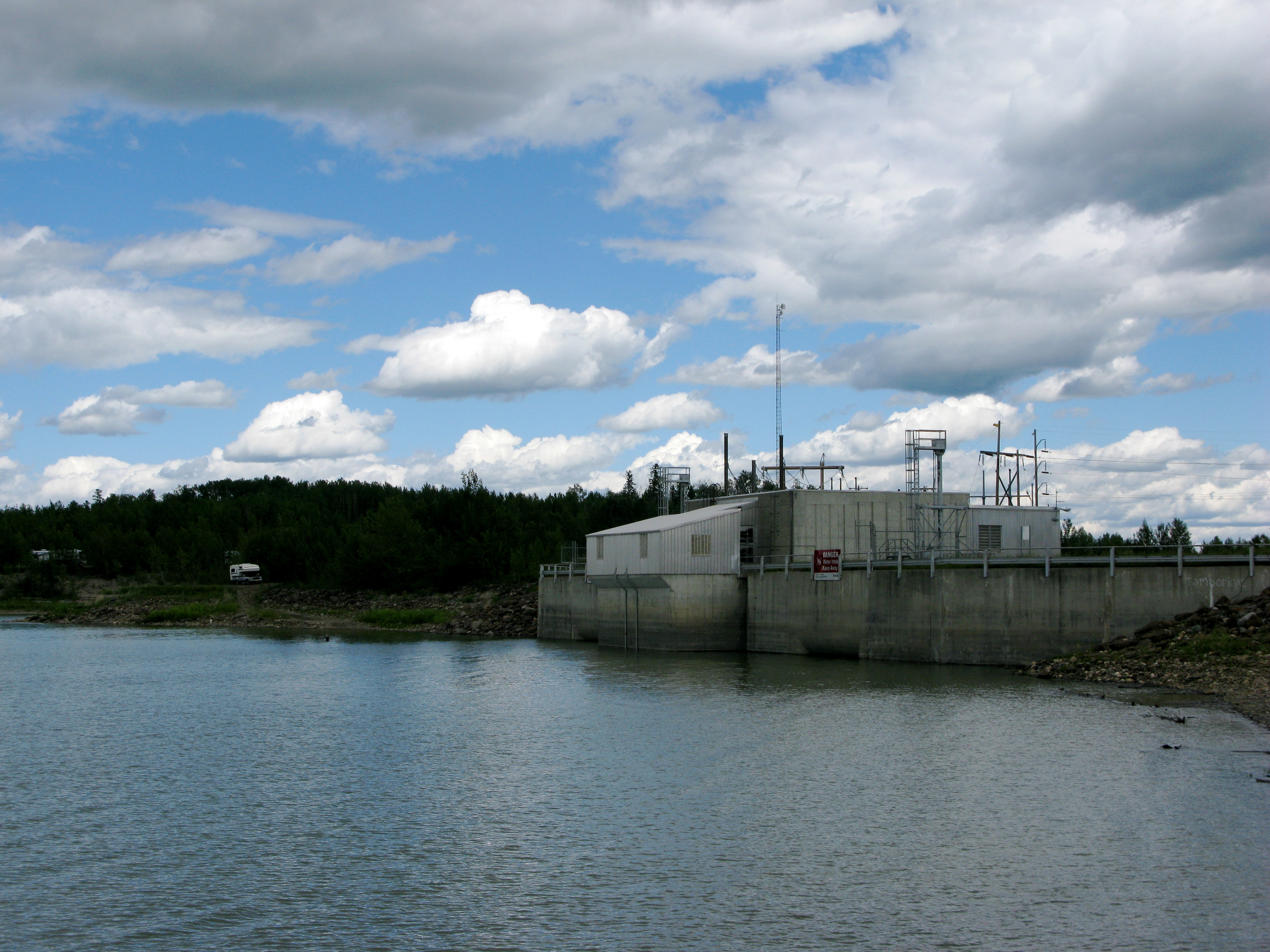
A control structure at the Brazeau Reservoir

- Southesk River
  - Southesk Lake
- Thistle Creek
  - Chimney Creek
- Marshybank Creek
  - Marshybank Lake
- Canyon Creek
- Moosehound Creek
- Cardinal River
- Blackstone River
- Elk River
- Nordegg River

== See also ==
- Geography of Alberta
- List of Alberta rivers
