= Marguerite River Wildland Provincial Park =

Protected area in northern Alberta, Canada

- IUCN category Ib (wilderness area)
- Location within Alberta Location within Canada
- Location: Wood Buffalo, Alberta, Canada
- Nearest city: Fort McMurray
- Coordinates: 57°38′14″N 110°15′55″W
- Area: 196,301.9 ha (757.926 sq mi)
- Established: 20 December 2000
- Governing body: Alberta Forestry, Parks and Tourism

Marguerite River Wildland Provincial Park is a wildland provincial park in Wood Buffalo, northern Alberta, Canada. The park was established on 20 December 2000 and has an area of 196,301.9 hectares (757.9 sq mi). The park is part of the Lower Athabasca Regional Plan. The park was named for the Marguerite River that flows thru the park and forms a portion of the park's western boundary. The park was originally created in 1998 as Marguerite Crag and Tail Wildland Provincial Park. It was reformed and renamed in 2000.

== Location ==
The park consists of two parcels of land, located east and northeast of Fort McKay, abutting the Saskatchewan border on the east. The northern limits of the park adjoin Richardson Wildland Provincial Park and the Marguerite River. The smaller, southern parcel is 9.7 kilometres (6 mi) north-to-south and 19 kilometres (12 mi) west of the Saskatchewan border covering Township 95 and Ranges 1 and 2, west of the fourth meridian. This parcel contains a portion of the Firebag River. The larger, northern parcel is 58 kilometres (36 mi) north to south covering Townships 97 thru 102. The largest extent westward is 48 kilometres (30 mi) at the junction of Reid Creek with Marguerite River.

== Ecology ==
The park contains two subregions of the Boreal Forest Natural Region of Alberta: Central Mixedwood and Athabasca Plain; and the Kazan Uplands subregion of the Canadian Shield region. The park contains landscapes unique in Alberta. The north portion of the park contains a dissected kame creating an extremely rugged landscape with relative elevations of over 200 metres (660 ft). The Marguerite and Richardson rivers have developed the best examples of braided stream valley in the Boreal Forest Natural Region. An esker standing over 65 metres (213 ft) marks the south end of the park. The park also includes a drumlin field and glacial flutes. The Snuff and Otter Lakes area represents the most pristine organic wetlands in Alberta's boreal forest. Within the park is a unique crag and tail landscape with granite crags and glacially deposited gravel tails on the lee side. The crag and tail landscape is part of the Canadian Shield Natural Region. A rare fern (Rock polypody) is found in the crag and tail area. Grizzly bears are found in the park.

== Activities ==
The park has no developed facilities so only wildlife viewing, backcountry hiking, and random backcountry camping are available. Snowmobiles are permitted on existing trails only. Hunting and fishing are allowed with proper permits.

== See also ==
- List of provincial parks in Alberta
- List of Canadian provincial parks
