= Blackstone River (Alberta) =

River in Alberta, Canada

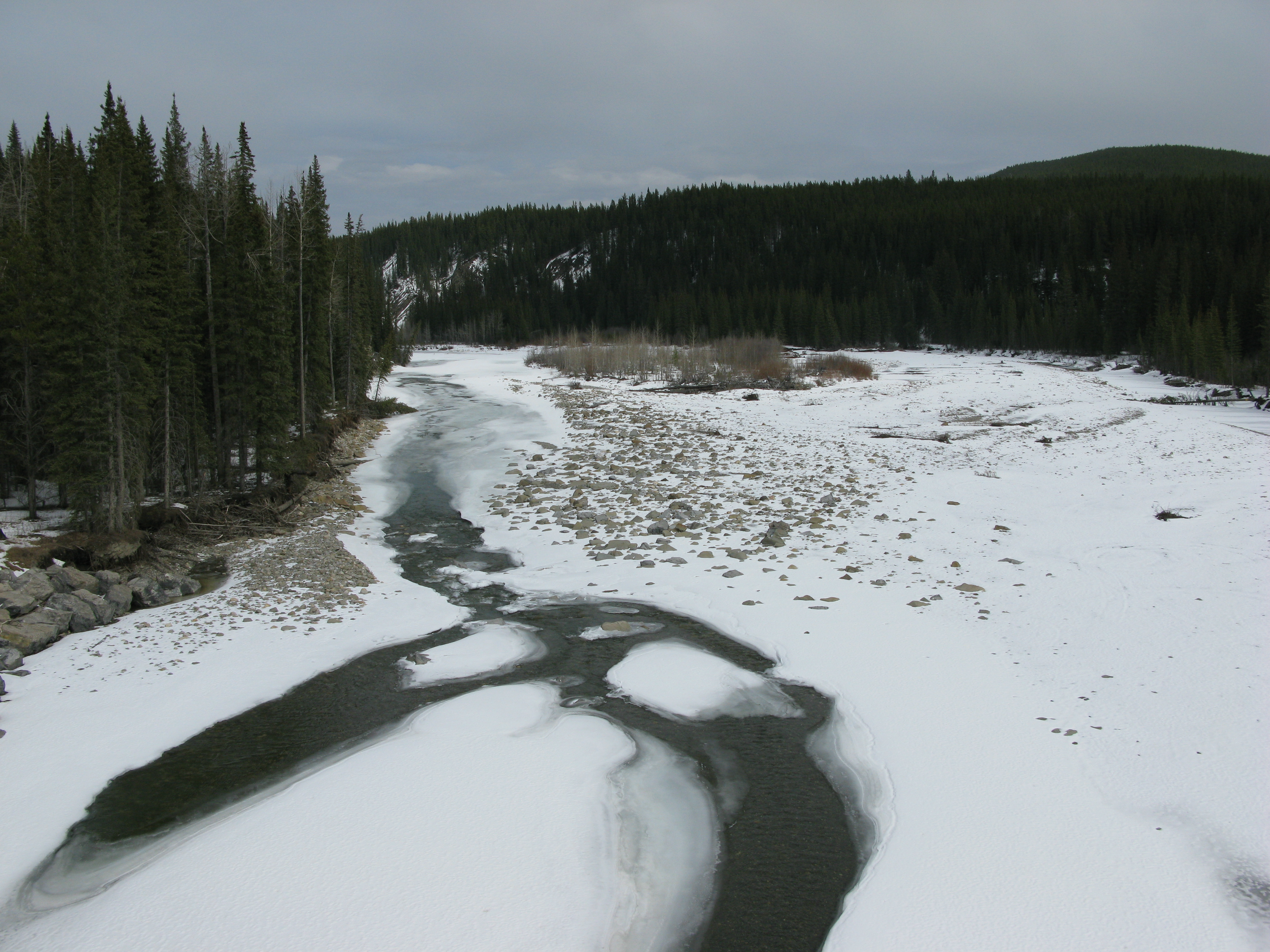
- The Blackstone River from Alberta Highway 40

Location
- Country: Canada
- Province: Alberta

Physical characteristics
- Source
  - location: Tarpeian Rock
  - coordinates: 52°49′38″N 116°4′56″W
  - elevation: 1,637 m (5,371 ft)
- Mouth
  - location: Brazeau River
  - coordinates: 52°49′43″N 116°05′03″W
  - elevation: 1,057 m (3,468 ft)

Blackstone River is a medium-sized river originating in the front ranges of the Canadian Rockies. It is a tributary of the Brazeau River, which in turn flows into the North Saskatchewan River.

The Blackstone forms at the base of a geological feature known as the Tarpeian Rock, just outside the southern boundary of Jasper National Park.

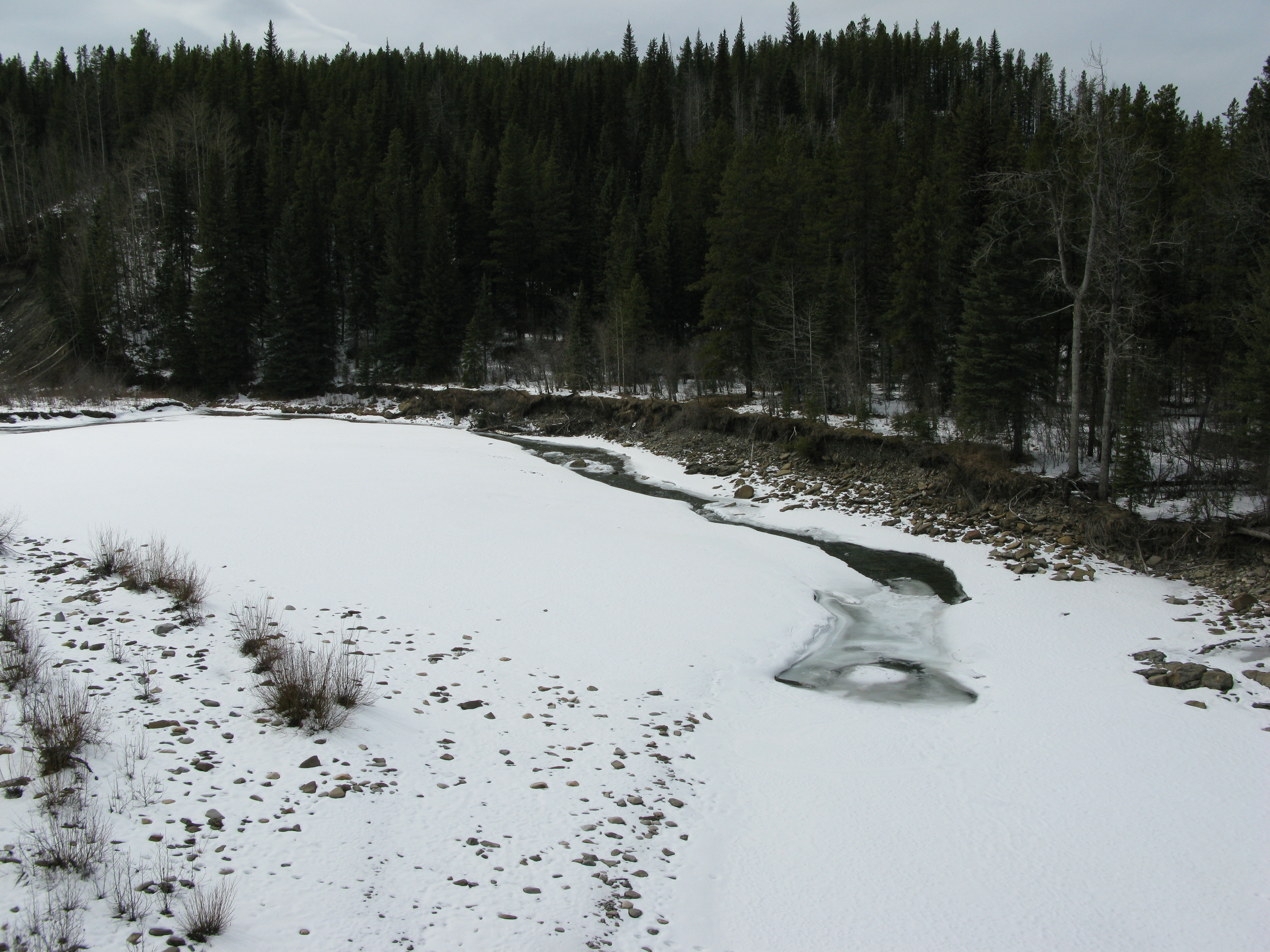
The Blackstone River from Alberta Highway 40

== History ==
Members of the Palliser Expedition discovered this river in the late 1850s. It was named the South Brazeau River after one of the expedition members, Joseph Brazeau of St. Louis.

Later, the river was renamed the Blackstone.

== Tributaries ==
(from headwaters to the Brazeau River)

- Mons Creek
- George Creek
- Smith Creek
- Cutoff Creek
- Wapiabi Creek
- Shanks Creek
- Lookout Creek
- Hansen Creek
- Chungo Creek
  - Dorothy Creek, Seepage Creek, Brown Creek, Clark Creek, McCormick Creek, Ashburner Creek
- Rundell Creek

== See also ==
- List of Alberta rivers
