= Firebag River =

River in Alberta and Saskatchewan, Canada

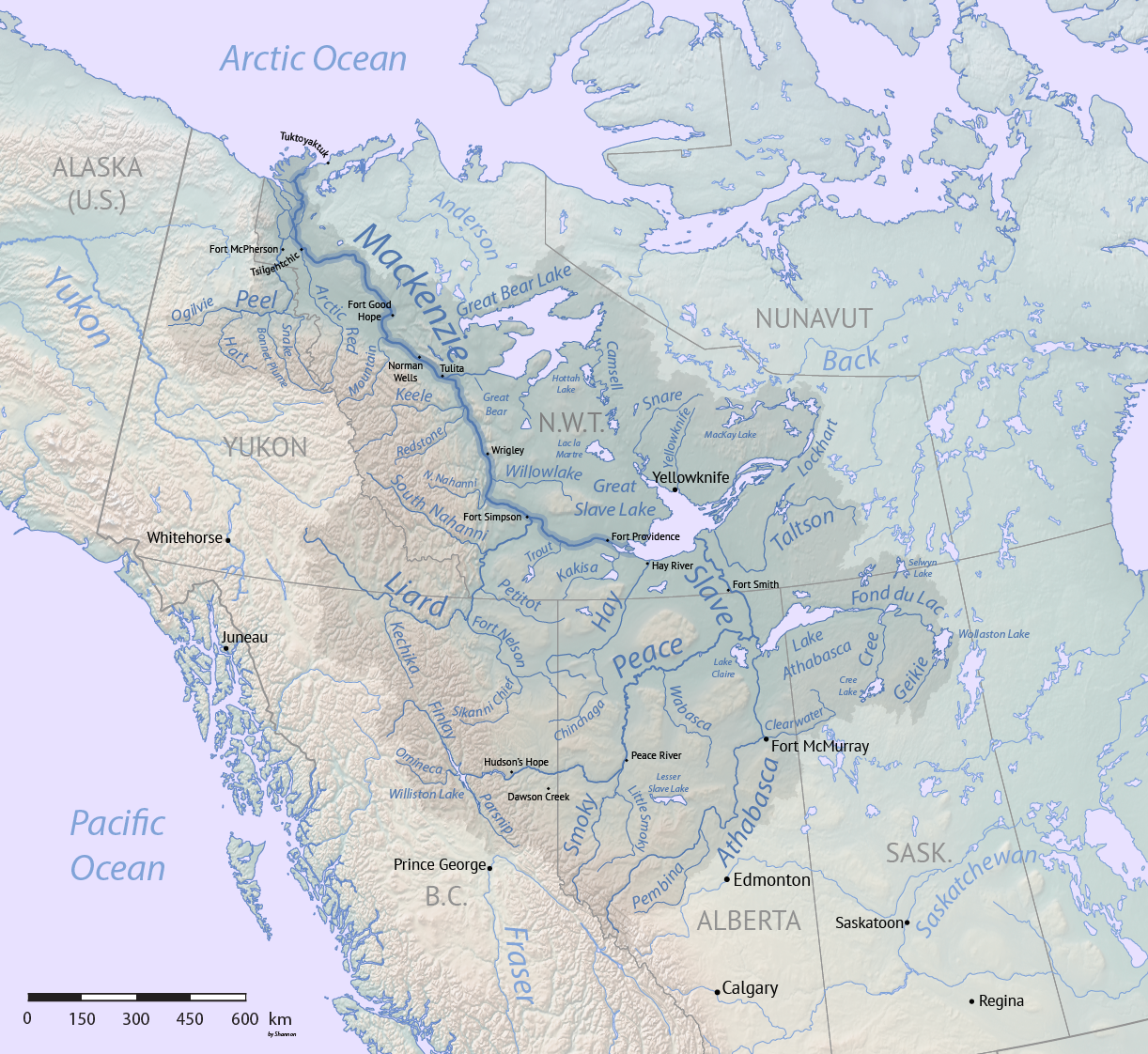
- Map of the Mackenzie River watershed

- Location of the river's mouth in Alberta Firebag River (Canada)

Location
- Country: Canada
- Provinces: Saskatchewan; Alberta

Physical characteristics
- Source: Unnamed lake
  - location: Northern Administration District, Saskatchewan
  - coordinates: 57.4267°N 109.6305°W
- Mouth: Athabasca River
  - location: Regional Municipality of Wood Buffalo, Alberta
  - coordinates: 57.7519°N 111.3538°W
- Length: 170 km (110 mi)

Basin features
- River system: Mackenzie River
- Tributaries
  - left: Wallace Creek
  - right: Trout Creek; Marguerite River
- Waterbodies: Firebag Lake

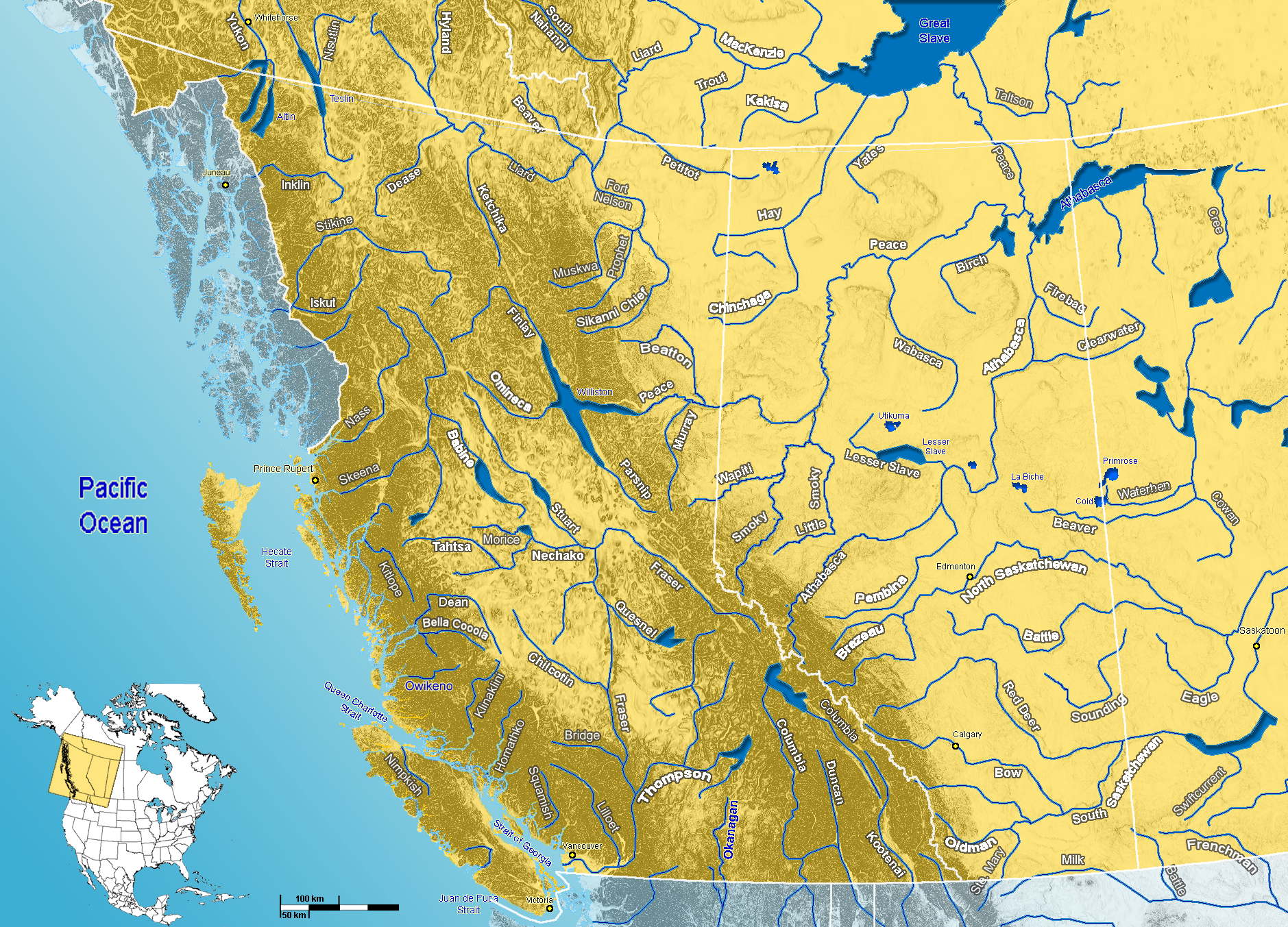
Firebag River in western Canada

The Firebag River is a river in northern Alberta and Saskatchewan, Canada. It gets its name from the traditional bags Aboriginals once used to carry fire-starting flints.

It originates from an unnamed lake east of Firebag Lake in northwestern Saskatchewan, flows west into Alberta, and discharges into the Athabasca River 65 kilometres (40 mi) north of Fort McKay.

The length of the river is approximately 170 kilometres (110 mi), and the average discharge at the Athabasca River confluence is 20 m^{3}/s.

The southern tract of Marguerite River Wildland protects part of the river valley, and a recreation park for Northeast Alberta Region located along the river was proposed in 1980.

Suncor has an SAGD project in production (the Firebag in-situ operation), extracting bitumen from the oil sands of the McMurray Formation located in the river basin.

Fort MacKay/Firebag Aerodrome is located 22 nautical miles (41 km; 25 mi) away.

== See also ==
- List of rivers of Alberta
- List of rivers of Saskatchewan
