= Chungo Creek =

Stream in Western Alberta, Canada

Coordinates: 52°42′45″N 116°19′17″W

Chungo Creek is a large creek close to Nordegg in Western Alberta, Canada. It starts at a mountain lake called Upper Mons Lake, and eventually empties into the Blackstone River (Alberta).

Chungo is a word derived from the Stoney language, meaning "trail".

== Tributaries ==
- Seepage Creek
- Mons Creek
- Upper Hansen Creek
- Dorothy Creek
- Clark Creek

== Fish species ==
The most common fish of the Chungo Creek is the bull trout. There is also westslope cutthroat, brook and brown trout and a small population of mountain whitefish further down the creek.

== See also ==
- List of Alberta rivers
