= Adolphus Lake =

Lake in Alberta, Canada

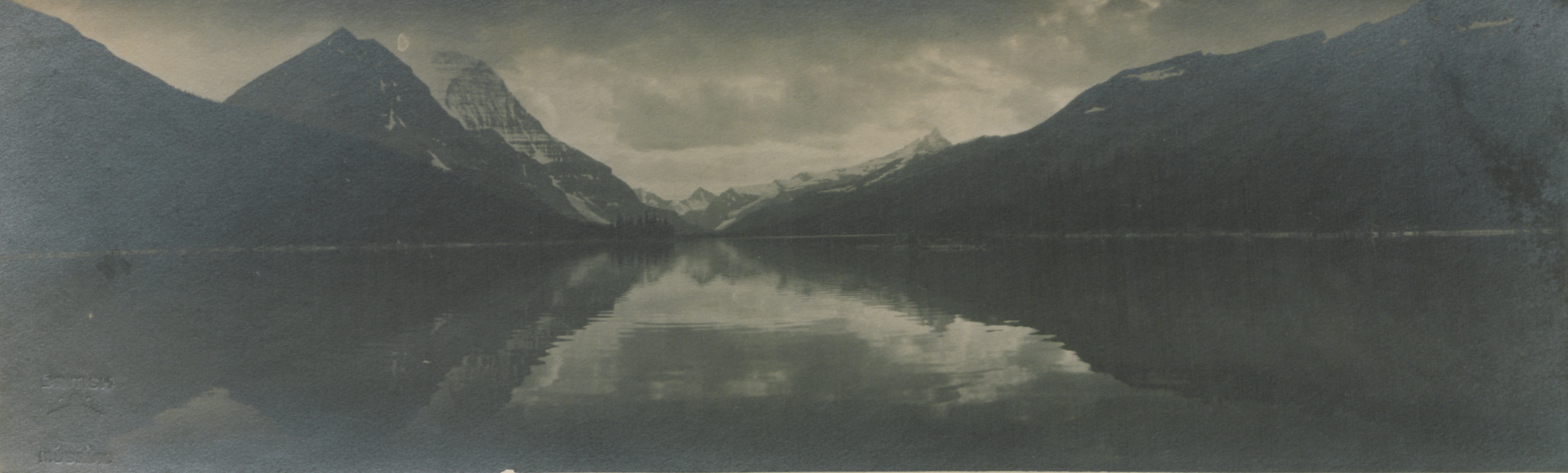
- Lake Adolphus in 1911

- Location within British Columbia
- Location: Mount Robson Provincial Park, British Columbia
- Coordinates: 53°10′12″N 119°7′5″W
- Primary outflows: Smoky River
- Basin countries: Canada
- Settlements: None

Adolphus Lake is in Alberta, Canada, on the border of Jasper National Park and Mount Robson Provincial Park.

Adolphus Lake was named after Adolphus Moberly, an early Métis in the Jasper area with close links to the local Iroquois. He guided the Arthur Coleman 1908 expedition from Jasper valley up the Moose River, to Moose Pass. The expedition continued into the headwaters of the Smoky River, and over Robson Pass to the foot of Robson Glacier.

== See also ==
- List of lakes of Alberta
