= Cutbank River =

Location
- Country: Canada

Physical characteristics
- Source
  - location: Rocky Mountains foothills
  - elevation: 1,555 meters (5,102 ft)
- Mouth
  - location: Smoky River
  - coordinates: 54.70681°N 118.53823°W
  - elevation: 625 meters (2,051 ft)

Cutbank River is a river in western Alberta, Canada. It is a major tributary of the Smoky River.

It originates in the boreal forest of the Rocky Mountains foothills, on the south-eastern flanks of Nose Mountain, and flows east into the Smoky River. Before emptying in the Smoky, it is crossed by Bighorn Highway. From its springs at 625 meters (2,051 ft), it falls 930 meters (3,050 ft) to an elevation of 625 meters (2,051 ft) at its mouth.

The river is known for northern pike, walleye and bull trout fishing.

== See also ==
- List of rivers of Alberta
