= Inverness River =

Stream in Alberta, Canada

Coordinates: 55.06682°N 115.30231°W

Inverness River is a stream in Alberta, Canada.

Inverness River takes its name from Inverness, in Scotland.

== See also ==
- List of rivers of Alberta
