= Puskwaskau River =

Location
- Country: Canada
- Province: Alberta

Physical characteristics
- Source
  - location: Puskwaskau Lake
  - coordinates: 55.27887°N 117.65259°W
  - elevation: 715 meters (2,346 ft)
- Mouth
  - location: Smoky River
  - coordinates: 55.48403°N 118.15646°W
  - elevation: 440 meters (1,440 ft)

The Puskwaskau River is a short river in Northern Alberta, Canada. It is a tributary of the Smoky River flowing westwards in the Peace River Country. Its waters flow through the Smoky River, Peace River, Slave River, Great Slave Lake and Mackenzie River into the Arctic Ocean.

The name of the river originates from the Cree word for short grass. The Puskwaskau Formation, a stratigraphical unit of the Western Canadian Sedimentary Basin, was named for the river.

== Course ==
The river originates from the Puskwaskau Lake in the Sturgeon Heights, at an elevation of 715 meters (2,346 ft), north-west from Valleyview. It flows north-west and receives the waters of Little Puskwaskau River before being crossed by Highway 676. It continues flowing in a western direction through a 150 meters (490 ft) deep canyon before it empties in the Smoky River, west of Teepee Creek, at an elevation of 440 meters (1,440 ft), 40 kilometers (25 mi) west of its origin.

== Tributaries ==
- Puskwaskau Lake
- Little Puskwaskau River

== See also ==
- List of rivers of Alberta
