= Berland River =

River in Alberta, Canada

Coordinates: 54.0016°N 116.8727°W

Berland River is a stream in Alberta, Canada. It is a tributary of the Athabasca River.

A former variant name was "Baptiste Berland River". It was named after Jean Baptiste Berland, a Métis hunter who was the guide of botanist Thomas Drummond when he was exploring the region. Its course runs around 216km long.

== See also ==
- List of rivers of Alberta
