= Brazeau Reservoir =

Lake in Alberta, Canada

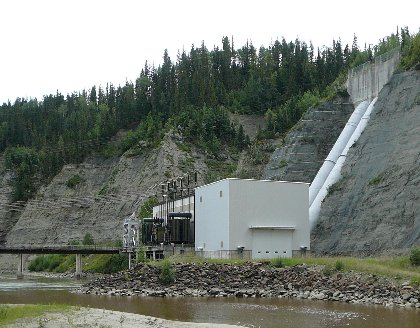
- Brazeau Dam Power Plant

- Location within Alberta
- Location: Brazeau County, Central Alberta
- Coordinates: 52°56′53″N 115°38′21″W
- Type: man-made reservoir
- Primary inflows: Brazeau River
- Primary outflows: Brazeau River
- Basin countries: Canada
- Max. length: 13 kilometres (8.1 mi)
- Max. width: 6 kilometres (3.7 mi)

Brazeau Reservoir is a large man-made reservoir in Alberta, Canada. It is in Brazeau County of central Alberta, 55 kilometres (34 mi) southwest of Drayton Valley. It was developed along the Brazeau River, at the confluence with Elk River, in the hydrographic basin of the North Saskatchewan River.

Construction of the dam began around 1960 and was completed in 1963. The first generating unit was installed at the power plant in 1965, adding 355 MW of generating capacity to the Calgary Power System.

== Energy production ==
The dam and hydroelectric plant are managed by TransAlta. The plant has an electricity generating capacity of 355 megawatts (MW). The Brazeau Plant is the largest hydroelectric plant owned by TransAlta.

The hydrology of the Brazeau area allows it to produce an annual average of 397,000 megawatt-hours (MW⋅h) of electric energy. The annual output of the Brazeau Plant is slightly behind TransAlta's Bighorn Dam, with a smaller peak capacity of 120 MW but an available water supply that allows it to produce 408,000 MW⋅h each year. In order to deal with the sometimes challenging water supply on the Brazeau, the plant includes a pump-back system capable of lifting water from the outflow below the dam back up to the 20 kilometres (12 mi) long reservoir, allowing the power plant to maintain capacity at low reservoir water levels.

== Recreation ==
The Brazeau Reservoir Provincial Recreation Area is established near the lake, upstream from the dam, and another three campgrounds dot its shores.

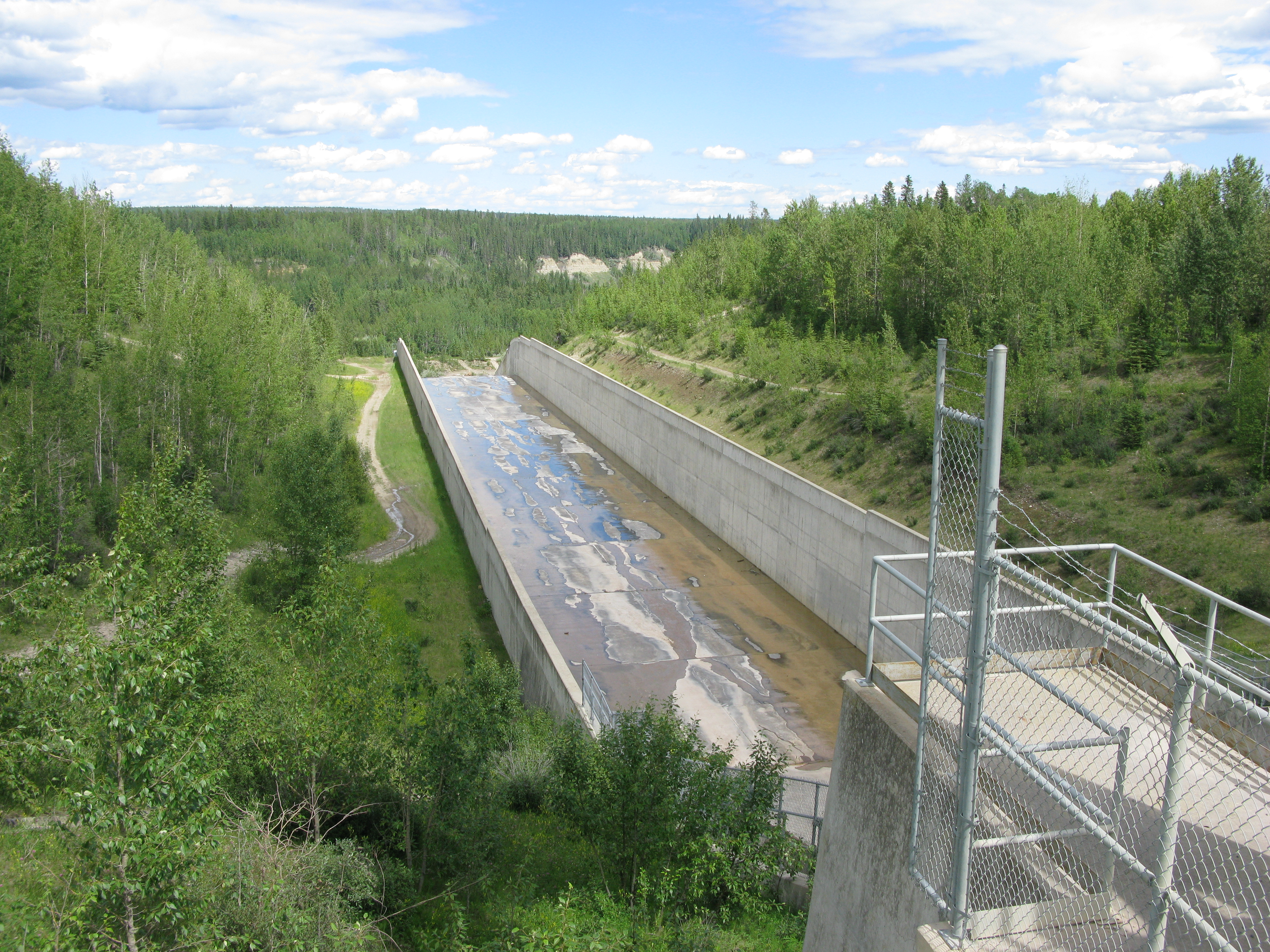
Spillway of the Brazeau Dam

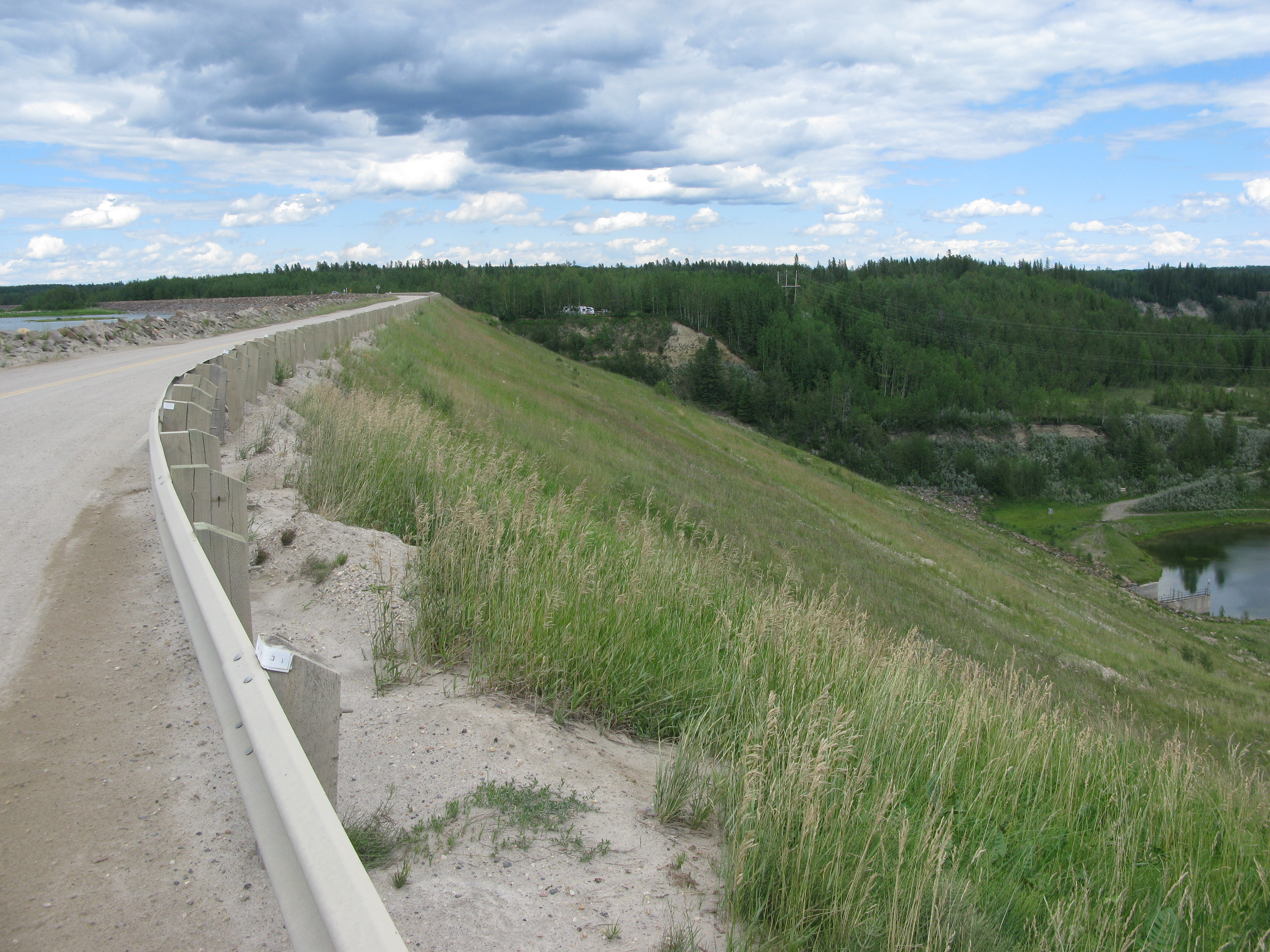
Brazeau Dam

== See also ==
- List of lakes in Alberta
