= Coutts River =

Stream in Alberta, Canada

Coordinates: 54.88345°N 114.5022°W

Coutts River is a stream in Alberta, Canada.

Coutts River has the name of G. M. Coutts, a government surveyor.

== See also ==
- List of rivers of Alberta
