= Smoky River =

River in Alberta, Canada

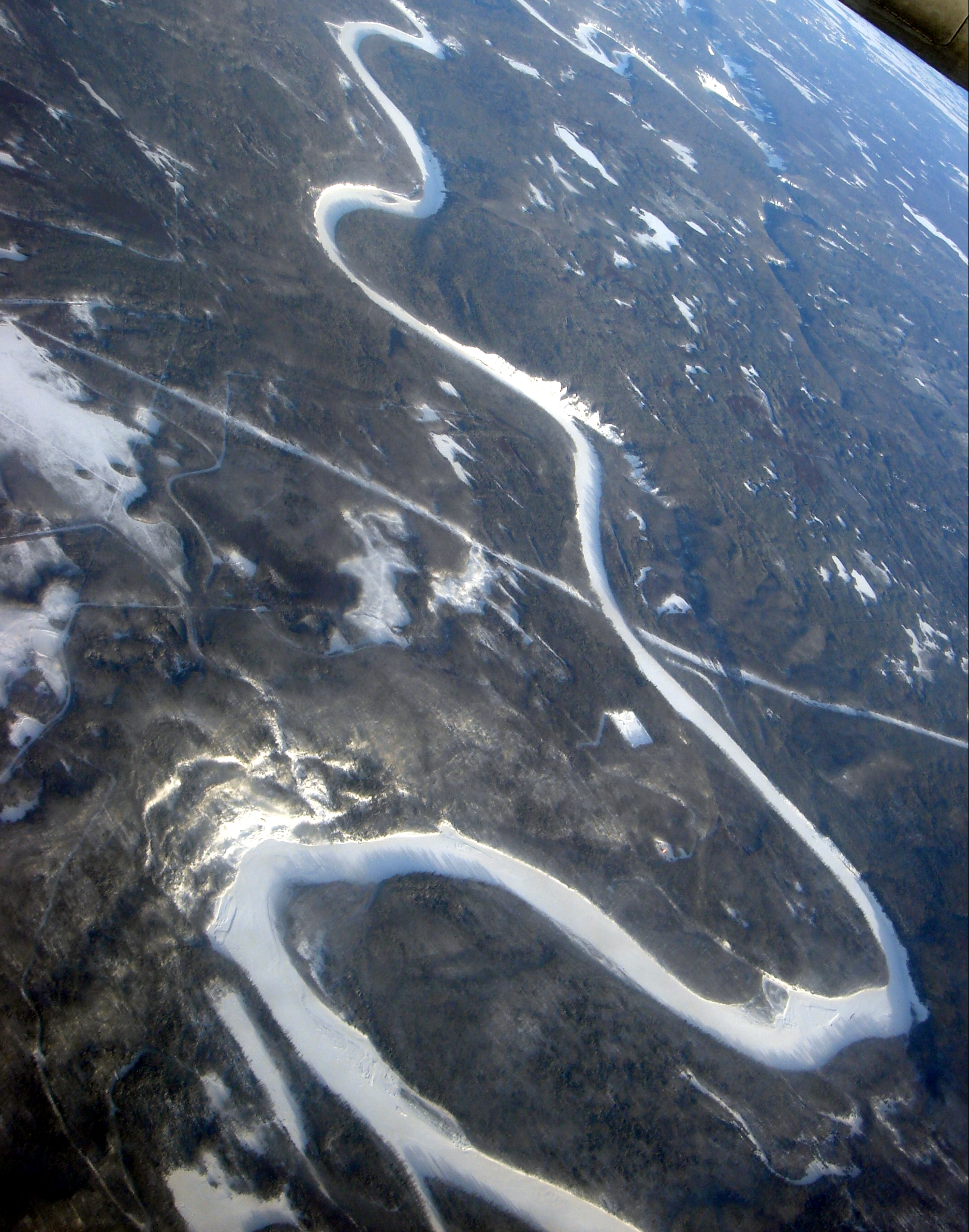
- Frozen Smoky River south-east of Grande Prairie

Location
- Country: Canada
- Province: Alberta

Physical characteristics
- Source
  - location: Adolphus Lake
  - coordinates: 53°10′16″N 119°07′01″W
  - elevation: 1,680 m (5,510 ft)
- Mouth
  - location: Peace River
  - coordinates: 56°11′09″N 117°20′03″W
  - elevation: 315 m (1,033 ft)
- Discharge
  - average: 375 m^{3}/s (13,200 cu ft/s)

The Smoky River is a river in western Alberta, Canada. It is a major tributary of the Peace River. The name refers to the presence of "smouldering beds of coal in the riverbank" noted by the Cree people, an Indigenous people of the area.

It drains an area of 50,300 km^{2} (19,400 sq mi). From its headwaters to the Peace River, the Smoky River has a total length of 492 kilometres (306 mi). The average discharge is 347 m^{3}/s (12,300 cu ft/s).

== Course ==
Confluence with Peace River

The Smoky River originates in the Canadian Rockies, in the northern area of Jasper National Park from Adolphus Lake (53.171N 119.117W). It then flows northeast through the Willmore Wilderness Park until it passes near the hamlet of Grande Cache. It continues north, passes Watino and merges into the Peace River south of the Town of Peace River, Alberta.

== Tributaries ==
- Adolphus Lake
- Calumet Creek
- Carcajou Creek
- Swoda Creek
- Chown Creek
- Twintree Lake
- Short Creek
- Rockville Creek
  - Azure Lake
- Desolation Creek
- No Luck Creek
- Jackpine River
- Muddywater River
- Wolverine Creek
- Calypso Creek
- Corral Creek
- Gentain Creek
- Goldrenrod Creek
- Lawrence Creek
- Henrietta Creek
- Delome Creek
- Davey Creek
- Eaton Creek
- Sulphur River
- Two Cabin Creek
- Roddy Creek
- Muskeg River
- Sheep Creek
- Norris Creek
- Bolton Creek
- Kakwa River
- Cutbank River
- Micmillar Creek
- Lignite Creek
- Ellenwood Lake
- Wapiti River
- Simonette River
- Kleskun Creek
- Puskwaskau River
- Bad Heart River
- Little Smoky River
- Peavine Creek
- Hunting Creek
  - Lalby Creek

== Proposed water withdrawal ==
In 2026, the Smoky River was identified as the proposed water source for Wonder Valley, a planned artificial-intelligence data-centre campus in the Municipal District of Greenview. The project's proponent, O'Leary Digital, said its maximum water demand when in full operation would be less than 6×10^{6} m^{3} (4,900 acre⋅ft) annually. The Municipal District of Greenview holds a license under the Water Act to use up to 6×10^{6} m^{3} (4,900 acre⋅ft) per year from the river, and a preliminary certificate for withdrawals of up to 24×10^{6} m^{3} (19,000 acre⋅ft) annually intended for the wider Greenview Industrial Gateway zone, of which Wonder Valley would be part.

According to Alberta's Ministry of Environment and Protected Areas, water-withdrawal approvals for the Smoky River include conditions intended to protect the environment, and withdrawals may be restricted during periods of low flow. The ministry said the 24×10^{6} m^{3} (19,000 acre⋅ft) application, described as about 2% of the Smoky River watershed's annual yield, remained under review at the time.

Water use was among the concerns residents raised at a June 2026 open house on the project, along with its projected heat output and noise. The Sturgeon Lake Cree Nation challenged the water-license decision and called on the federal government to conduct an impact assessment, while the provincial government said the project was exempt from a provincial environmental impact assessment but would still require permits and approvals.

== See also ==
- List of rivers of Alberta
