= Lesser Slave Lake =

Body of water in Alberta, Canada

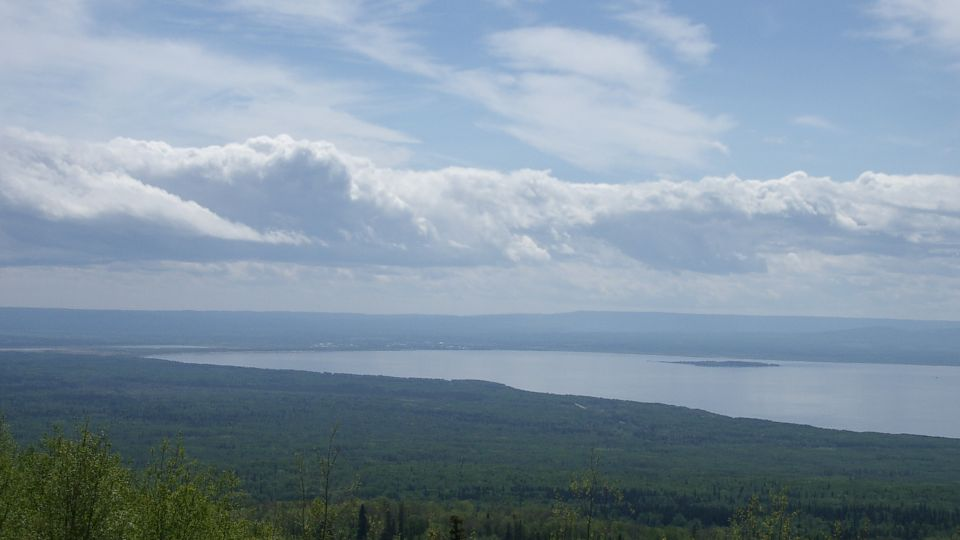
- Southeast corner of the lake from Marten Mountain looking south, with Dog Island, Devonshire Beach, and the Town of Slave Lake visible in the distance

- Location within Alberta
- Location: Big Lakes / Lesser Slave River No. 124, Alberta
- Coordinates: 55°26′26″N 115°29′19″W
- Type: Eutrophic
- Primary inflows: South Heart River, Swan River Driftpile River, Assineau River, Marten River
- Primary outflows: Lesser Slave River
- Catchment area: 13,900 km^{2} (5,400 sq mi)
- Basin countries: Canada
- Max. length: +100 km (62 mi)
- Max. width: 15 km (9.3 mi)
- Surface area: 1,168 km^{2} (451 sq mi)
- Average depth: 11.4 m (37 ft)
- Max. depth: 20.5 m (67 ft)
- Water volume: 13.69 km^{3} (11.10×10^{6} acre⋅ft)
- Shore length^{1}: 247 km (153 mi)
- Surface elevation: 578 m (1,896 ft)
- Settlements: Slave Lake, High Prairie, Alberta
- ^{1} Shore length is not a well-defined measure.

Lesser Slave Lake is located in northern Alberta, Canada, northwest of Edmonton. It is the second largest lake (Note: Lake Claire, in northeast Alberta, is largest) entirely within Alberta boundaries (and the largest easily accessible by vehicle), covering 1,160 km^{2} (450 sq mi) and measuring over 100 km (62 mi) long and 15 km (9.3 mi) at its widest point. Lesser Slave Lake averages 11.4 m (37 ft) in depth and is 20.5 m (67 ft) at its deepest. It drains eastwards into the Athabasca River by way of the Lesser Slave River.

The town of Slave Lake is located at the eastern tip of the lake, around the outflow of Lesser Slave River.

== Conservation and development ==
Due to its location on a major fly-way for migrating birds, Lesser Slave Lake is popular with birders. The nearby Lesser Slave Lake Provincial Park has lakeside camping facilities located along sand beaches, with some rocky beaches as well. Fishing is popular and legal. The entire north shore of the lake is protected, other reserves being Hilliard's Bay Provincial Park, Lesser Slave Lake Wildland and Grouard Trail Park Reserve.

Highway 2 and the Canadian National Railway follow the southern shore of the lake, and the Bicentennial Highway has its southernmost point at eastern end of the lake.

A number of Indian reserves are established at the shores of the lake:

- Kapawe'no First Nations Lands 150, 230 and 231 of the Kapawe'no First Nation,
- Sucker Creek 150a of the Sucker Creek Cree First Nation
- Drift Pile River 150 of the Driftpile First Nation
- Swan River 150e of the Swan River First Nation
- Sawridge 150g and the Sawridge Band

== Accidents ==
February 14, 1968

On February 14, 1968, a Cessna 182H CF-WUK plane crashed into the lake due to ice forming on the wings and causing the pilot to lose control. The pilot was Graham James Cox, a former 501 Squadron Commander during the Second World War. Both he and his two passengers died in the accident. The passengers were William Henry Lucus and Kenneth McIntosh McMillan.

May 20, 2011

On May 20, 2011, a Bell 212 helicopter crashed into the lake while fighting the 2011 Slave Lake fire. The pilot, 54-year-old Jean-Luc Deba of Montreal, died. On the one-year anniversary, a park at Canyon Creek was named in Deba's honor.

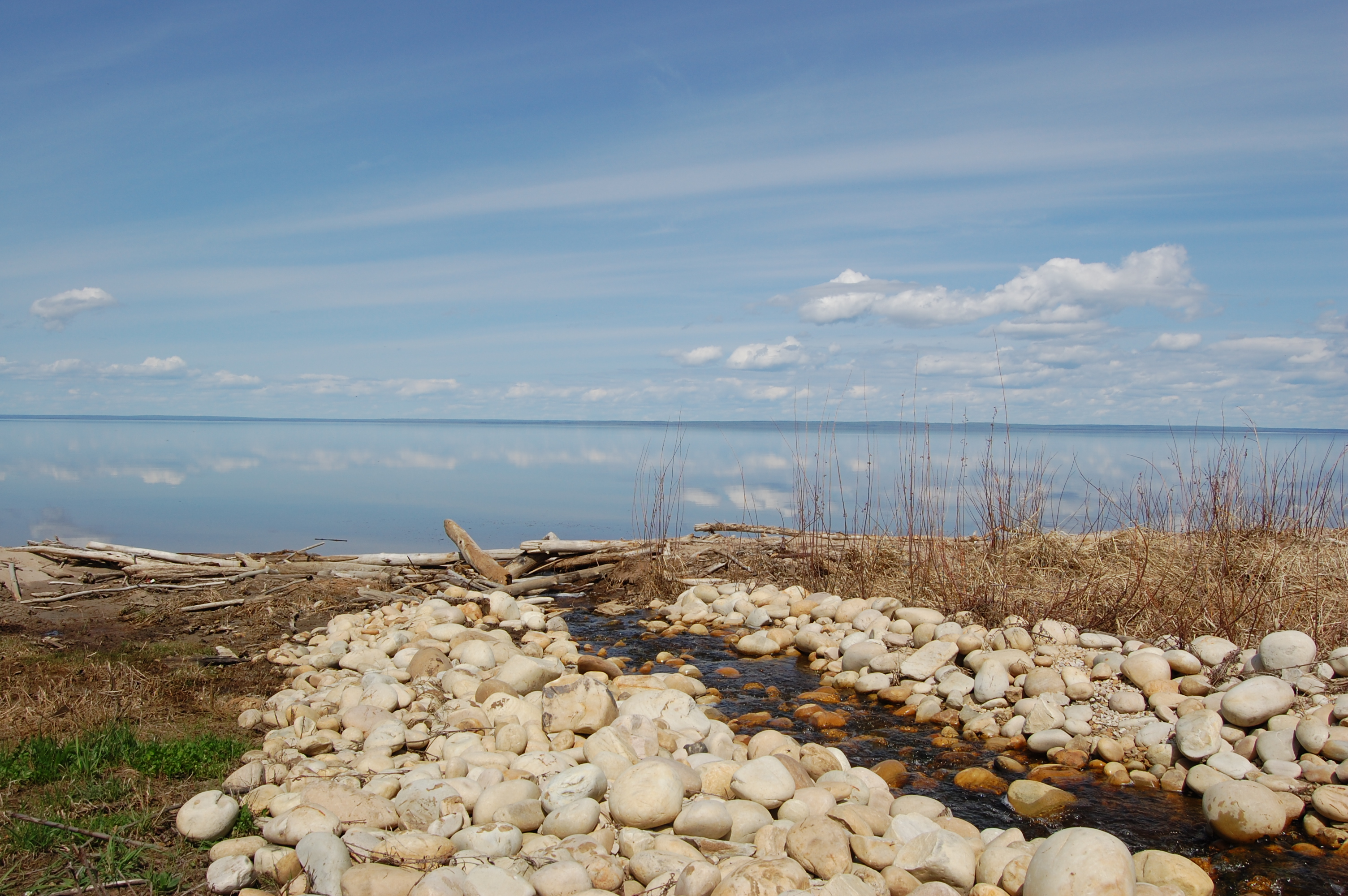
Lesser Slave Lake at Canyon Creek

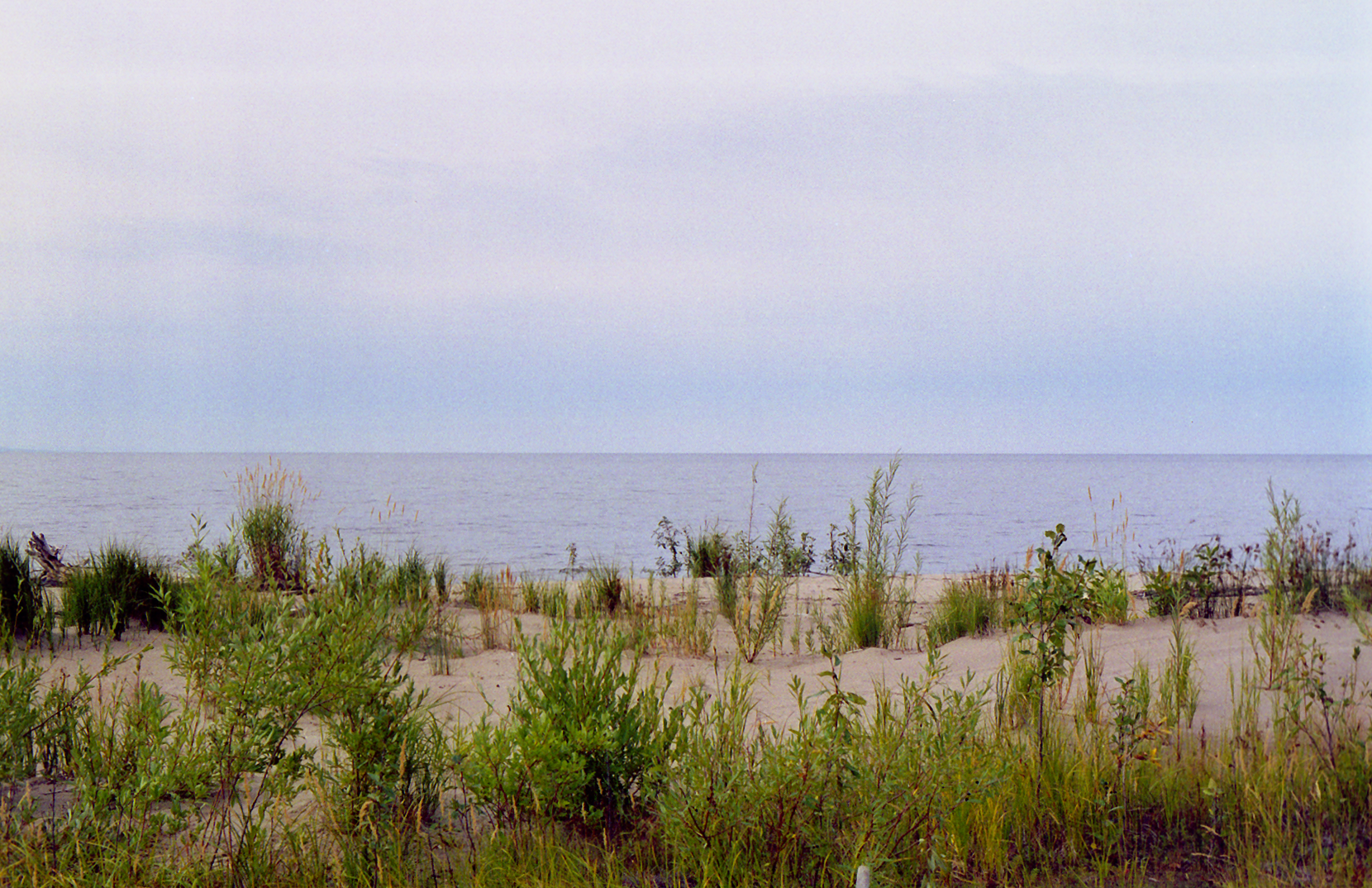
Slave Lake shoreline
