= Marten River (Alberta) =

Location
- Country: Canada
- Province: Alberta

Physical characteristics
- Source
  - location: Marten Lakes
  - coordinates: 55°35′28″N 114°37′43″W
  - elevation: 779 m (2,556 ft)
- Mouth
  - location: Lesser Slave Lake
  - coordinates: 55°30′52″N 114°56′15″W
  - elevation: 577 m (1,893 ft)

The Marten River is a short river in central Alberta. The Marten is one of the major inflows of Lesser Slave Lake, which drains through the Lesser Slave River, a major tributary of the Athabasca River. Significant debate exists regarding the origin of the river's name. One theory suggests the river, as well as nearby Marten Mountain were named for a local trapper. The other theory suggests the river and mountain were named for martens, a weasel that inhabits the region. The Geological Survey of Canada used the name Martin River on an 1892 map.

The river forms to the north of Marten Mountain at the outlet of the westernmost Marten Lake. It flows southwest before passing under Alberta Highway 88. It enters Lesser Slave Lake at the northern tip of Lesser Slave Lake Provincial Park

== See also ==
- List of Alberta rivers
