= Muddywater River =

Location
- Country: Canada
- Province: Alberta

Physical characteristics
- Source
  - location: Morkill Pass
  - coordinates: 53°40′54″N 119°46′09″W
  - elevation: 1,648 m (5,407 ft)
- Mouth
  - location: Smoky River
  - coordinates: 53°46′34″N 119°20′56″W
  - elevation: 1,048 m (3,438 ft)

The Muddywater River is an early tributary of the Smoky River. It forms in the Canadian Rockies, within Willmore Wilderness Park, in the province of Alberta, north of Jasper National Park. The Muddywater forms at Morkill Pass, on the Continental Divide between Alberta and British Columbia.

It flows north and west, collecting runoff from Mount Forgent, Mount Sprague, and Llama Mountain before flowing into the Smoky River above Grande Cache, Alberta. The river's name is descriptive.

== See also ==
- List of Alberta rivers
