= Assineau River =

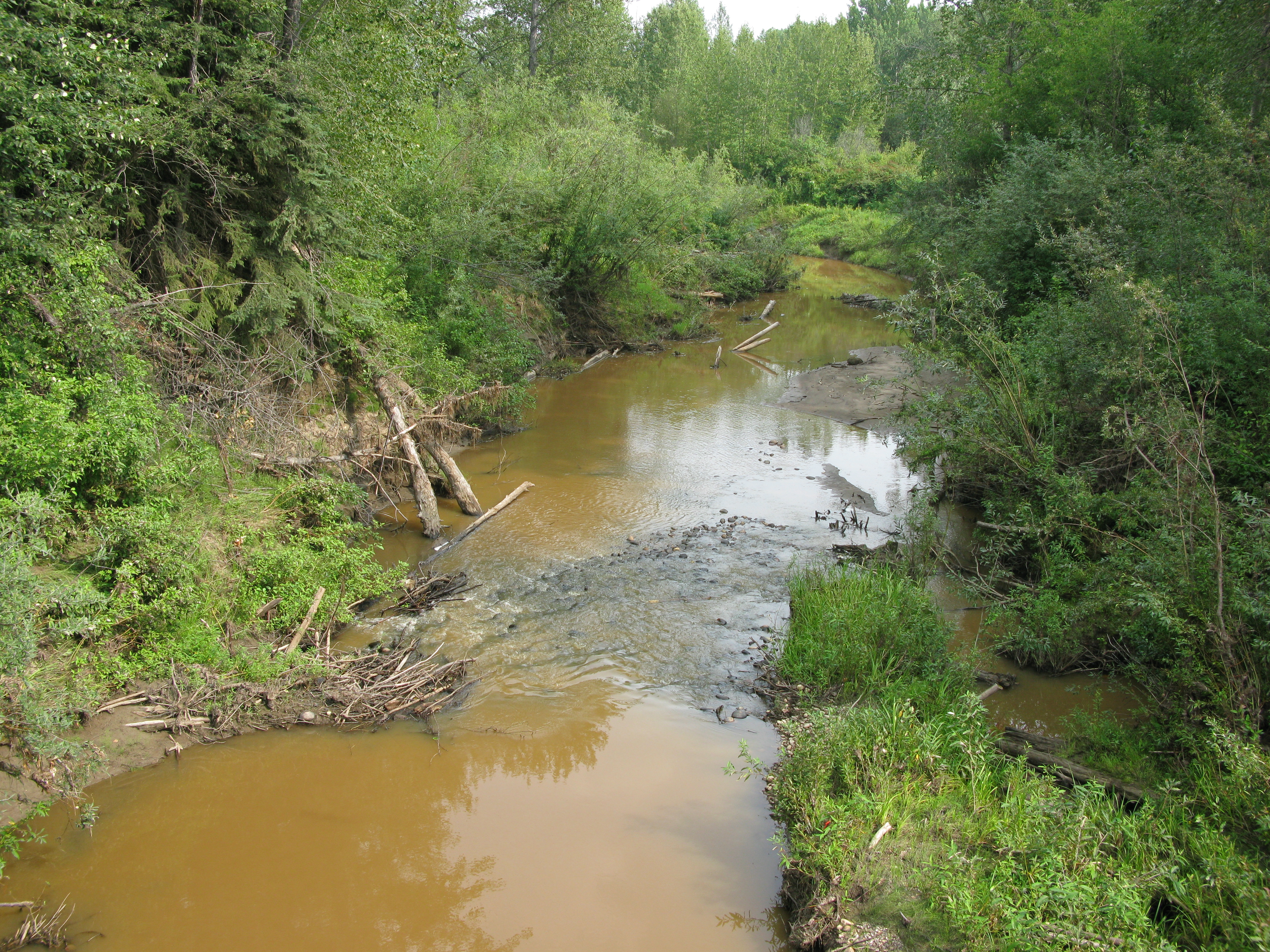
- The Assineau River after heavy rainfall

Location
- Country: Canada
- Province: Alberta

Physical characteristics
- Source
  - location: Sawridge Hill, Grizzly Ridge Wildland Provincial Park
  - coordinates: 55°13′24″N 115°13′13″W
  - elevation: 819 m (2,687 ft)
- Mouth
  - location: Lesser Slave Lake
  - coordinates: 55°23′27″N 115°11′54″W
  - elevation: 577 m (1,893 ft)

The Assineau River is a short river forming in central Alberta. The Assineau flows into Lesser Slave Lake, which flows out through the Lesser Slave River, a major tributary of the Athabasca River. The name of the river was in use by 1904. It is suggested that Assineau is a version of the Cree word for nobody.

The river forms in Grizzly Ridge Wildland Provincial Park and heads north towards Lesser Slave Lake. The river is bridged by Alberta Highway 2 and flows past the hamlet of Assineau, Alberta.

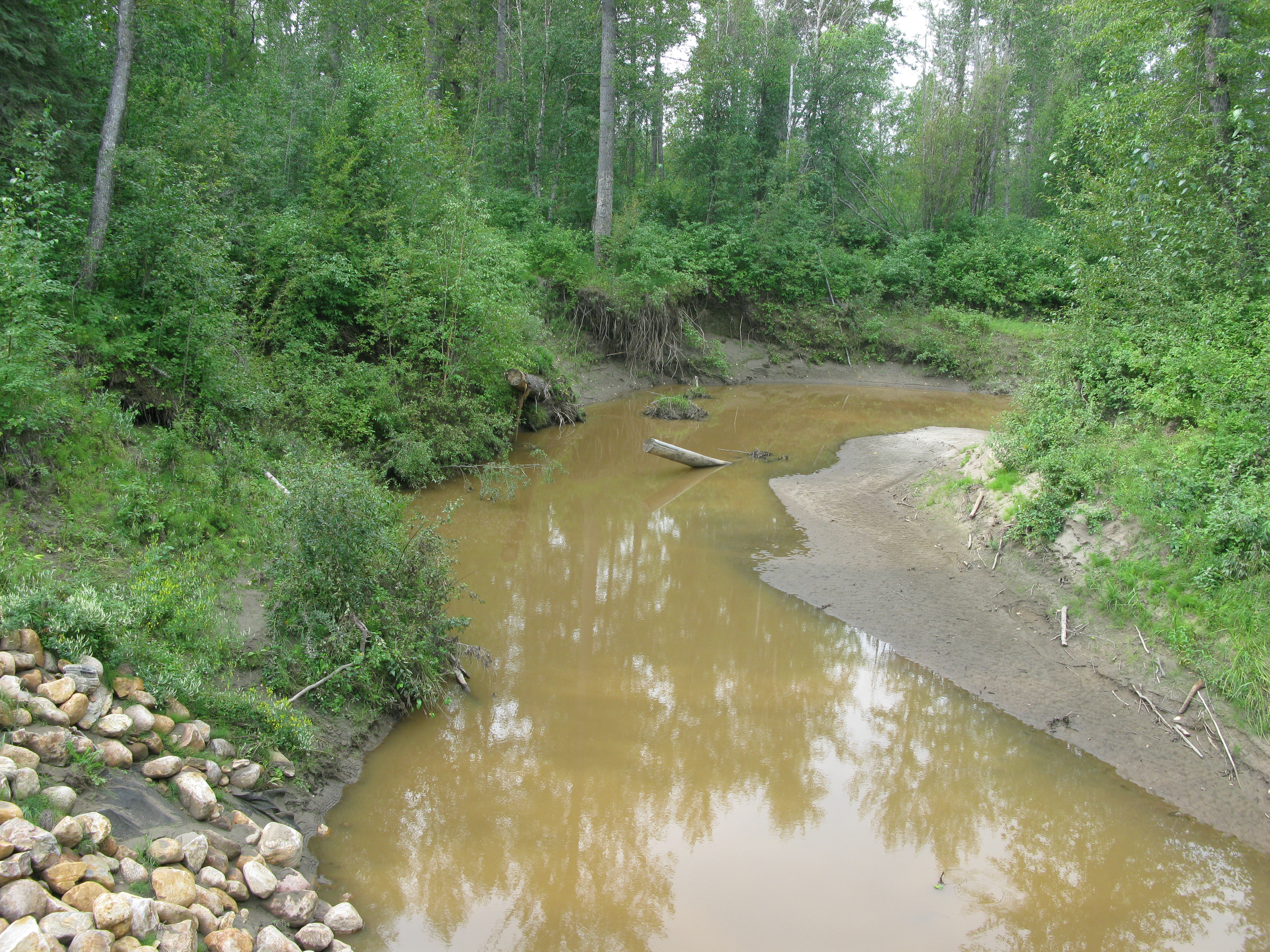
The Assineau near Lesser Slave Lake

== See also ==
- List of Alberta rivers
