= Driftpile River =

River in central Alberta, Canada

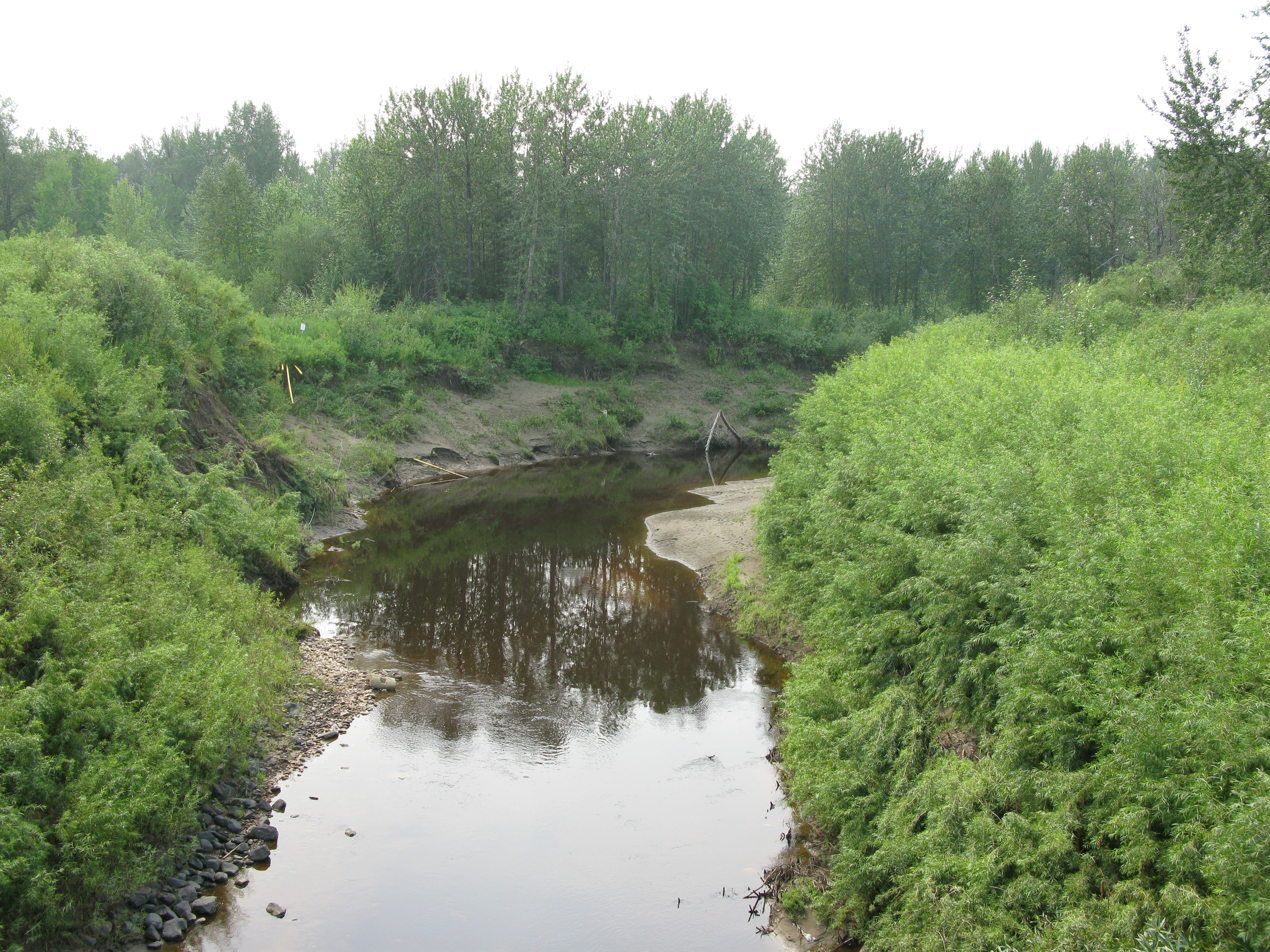
- The Driftpile River near Lesser Slave Lake

Location
- Country: Canada
- Province: Alberta

Physical characteristics
- Source
  - location: Swan Hills
  - coordinates: 54°52′24″N 115°45′51″W
  - elevation: 1,153 m (3,783 ft)
- Mouth
  - location: Lesser Slave Lake
  - coordinates: 55°22′37″N 115°38′27″W
  - elevation: 577 m (1,893 ft)

The Driftpile River is a medium-length river forming in central Alberta. The Drifpile flows into Lesser Slave Lake, which flows out through the Lesser Slave River, a major tributary of the Athabasca River. The Geological Survey of Canada was using the name Driftpile by 1892. The river was named because of the large amount of driftwood that collected at the river's mouth.

The river forms in Swan Hills region of central Alberta and heads north towards Lesser Slave Lake. The Driftpile's main tributary is the Little Driftpile River. The river is bridged by Alberta Highway 2 and flows past the hamlet of Driftpile, Alberta, as well as the Driftpile River First Nation Indian reserve.

== See also ==
- List of Alberta rivers
