= Elk River (Alberta) =

Location
- Country: Canada
- Location: Alberta

Physical characteristics
- Source
  - location: Elk River headwaters
  - coordinates: 52°56′12″N 116°25′34″W
  - elevation: 1,372 m (4,501 ft)
- Mouth
  - location: Brazeau Reservoir
  - coordinates: 52°57′02″N 115°42′41″W
  - elevation: 976 m (3,202 ft)

The Elk River is a short river rising in the eastern portion of the Alberta foothills. The river begins south of the ghost town of Coalspur and heads east before draining into the Brazeau Reservoir created by the Brazeau Dam on the Brazeau River, a tributary of the North Saskatchewan River.

The river follows the Elk River Road for much of its course. The Elk River Provincial Recreation Area is also located on the river.

== Physical characteristics ==
Alberta Environment, a Ministry of the Government of Alberta, undertook a survey of the Elk River in the 1980s. The following data was generated from the survey:

Reach number 1

- Terrain Surrounding Valley: Rolling hills, ground moraine

Valley characteristics

- Description: Wide, stream cut valley
- Terraces: 2 fragmentary levels

Valley Flat

- Width: 750 m
- Description: Broad alluvial floodplain occasionally marked by oxbow cutoffs

River Channel

- Pattern: Irregular meanders
- Islands: None
- Bar type: Point bars
- Bed material: Sand with local gravel
- Bank material: Sand and gravel overlain by silt

Reach number 2

- Terrain surrounding valley: Rolling hills, ground moraine

Valley characteristics

- Description: Broad glacial spillway channel now occupied by a smaller underfit stream
- Terraces: None

Valley flat

- Width: 500 m
- Description: Broad alluvial floodplain marked by numerous cutoffs

River channel

- Pattern: Irregular to tortuous meanders
- Islands: None
- Bar type: Point bars
- Bed material: Sand with local gravel
- Bank material: Sand and gravel overlain by silt, occasional till where channel is confined

Reach number 3

- Terrain surrounding valley: Rolling hills, fluted ground moraine

Valley characteristics

- Description: Wide, stream cut valley
- Terraces: None

Valley flat

- Width: 400 m
- Description: Alluvial valley marked by oxbow cutoffs

River channel

- Pattern: Irregular meanders
- Islands: None
- Bar type: Point bars, side bars
- Bed material: Sand with local gravel
- Bank material: Sand, gravel, and till

Reach number 4

- Terrain surrounding valley: Fluted ground moraine, some outwash

Valley characteristics

- Description: Narrow stream cut valley
- Terraces: None

Valley flat

- Width: >100 m
- Description: Highly variable

River channel

- Pattern: Irregular
- Islands: None
- Bar type: Point bars, side bars
- Bed material: Sand with local gravel
- Bank material: Sand, gravel, and till

Reach number 5

- Terrain surrounding valley: Rolling hills, ground moraine

Valley characteristics

- Description: Narrow stream cut valley
- Terraces: None

Valley flat

- Width: >100 m
- Description: Fragmentary

River channel

- Pattern: Irregular to sinuous
- Islands: None
- Bar type: Side bars
- Bed material: Gravel
- Bank material: Gravel, outwash, and till

Reach number 6

- Terrain surrounding valley: Rolling upland, ground moraine

Valley characteristics

- Description: Wide, stream cut valley
- Terraces: None

Valley flat

- Width: 400 m
- Description: Wide alluvial flat marked by oxbow cutoffs

River channel

- Pattern: Tortuous meanders
- Islands: None
- Bar type: Point bars
- Bed material: Sand
- Bank material: Sand overlain by silt

== See also ==
- List of Alberta rivers
