= Barricade Mountain =

Mountain in Alberta, Canada

- Location within Alberta

Highest point
- Elevation: 3,180 m (10,430 ft)
- Prominence: 320 m (1,050 ft)
- Listing: Mountains of Alberta
- Coordinates: 53°24′13″N 119°28′56″W

Geography
- Location: Alberta, Canada
- Parent range: Front Ranges
- Topo map: NTS 83E6 Twintree Lake

Climbing
- First ascent: 1911 by J. Norman Collie et al.

Barricade Mountain is a summit in Alberta, Canada.

Barricade Mountain was named for a rock outcropping in the form of a natural barricade.
