= Jackpine Mountain =

Mountain in AB/BC, Canada

- Location within Alberta Location within British Columbia Location within Canada

Highest point
- Elevation: 2,555 m (8,383 ft)
- Prominence: 474 m (1,555 ft)
- Parent peak: Chalco Mountain 2597 m
- Listing: Mountains of Alberta
- Coordinates: 53°22′16″N 119°33′43″W

Geography
- Country: Canada
- Provinces: Alberta and British Columbia
- Topo map: NTS 83E5 Chalco Mountain

Jackpine Mountain is located on the border of Alberta and British Columbia. It was named in 1913 by Mary Jobe Akeley. Jack pine timber accounts for the name.

== See also ==
- List of peaks on the Alberta–British Columbia border
- Mountains of British Columbia
