= South Heart River =

Watercourse in Alberta, Canada

Coordinates: 55.56681°N 116.18578°W

The South Heart River is a river of Alberta. It empties into Lesser Slave Lake and is the largest river flowing into it.
