= List of rivers of Alberta =

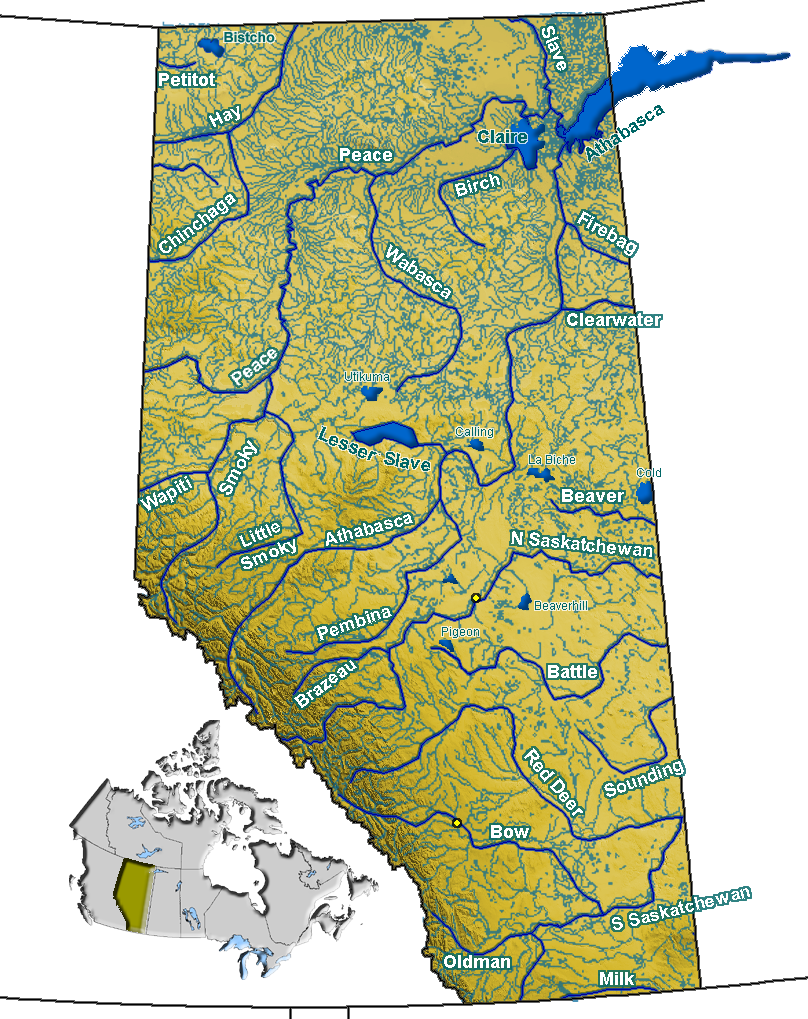
Rivers in Alberta

Alberta's rivers flow towards three different bodies of water, the Arctic Ocean, the Hudson Bay and the Gulf of Mexico. Alberta is located immediately east of the continental divide, so no rivers from Alberta reach the Pacific Ocean.

== List of rivers in Alberta ==
The north of the province drains towards the Arctic Ocean and the northern rivers have comparatively higher discharge rates than the southern ones that flow through a drier area. Alberta's southern half has waters flowing toward Hudson Bay, the only exception being the Milk River and its tributaries; they flow south through the Missouri and Mississippi River to the Gulf of Mexico.

=== Arctic Ocean watershed ===
Albertan rivers in the Arctic Ocean watershed are drained through Great Slave Lake and Mackenzie River, except for Petitot River which is drained through Liard River directly into the Mackenzie River, thus bypassing the Great Slave Lake.

- Athabasca River
  - Chaba River
  - Sunwapta River
  - Whirlpool River
  - Astoria River
  - Miette River
  - Maligne River
  - Snaring River
  - Rocky River
  - Snake Indian River
  - Fiddle River
  - Berland River
    - Wildhay River, Little Berland River, North Berland River, South Berland River
  - Sakwatamau River
  - Freeman River
    - Morse River
  - McLeod River
    - Gregg River, Embarras River, Erith River, Edson River
  - Pembina River
    - Lovett River, Lobstick River, Bigoray River, Paddle River, Wabash Creek, Steele River
  - Lesser Slave River
    - West Prairie River, East Prairie River, South Heart River, Driftpile River, Swan River, Inverness River, Assineau River, Otauwau River, Saulteaux River, Fawcett River, Marten River
  - Tawatinaw River
  - La Biche River
  - Calling River
  - La Petite Riviere Jaillante
  - Pelican River
  - House River
  - Licock River
  - Algar River
  - Horse River
  - Little Fishery River
  - Clearwater River
    - Christina River, Hangingstone River, Winefred River, Landels River, Graham Creek
  - Steepbank River
  - Mackay River
    - Dover River
  - Muskeg River
  - Ells River
  - Firebag River
  - Marguerite River
  - Richardson River
  - Maybelle River
- Peace River
  - Pouce Coupe River, Clear River, Eureka River, Montagneuse River, Hamelin Creek, Ksituan River, Hines Creek
  - Saddle River
    - Spirit River
  - Smoky River
    - Jackpine River, Muddywater River, Sulphur River, Muskeg River, Sheep Creek, Kakwa River, Cutbank River, Simonette River, Kleskun Creek, Puskwaskau River, Bad Heart River
    - Little Smoky River
      - Waskahigan River, Iosegun River, Goose River
    - Wapiti River
      - Red Deer Creek, Belcourt Creek, Narraway River, Nose Creek, Pinto Creek, Redwillow River, Bear River
  - Heart River
  - Whitemud River
  - Cadotte River
  - Little Cadotte River
  - Notikewin River
    - Hotchkiss River, Meikle River
  - Wolverine River
  - Buffalo River
  - Keg River
  - Little Burn River
  - Boyer River
  - Caribou River
  - Harmon River
  - Wabasca River
  - Mikkwa River
  - Wentzel River
  - Jackfish River
  - Lake Claire
    - Birch River, Harper Creek, Alice Creek, McIvor River, Mamawi Lake, Baril Lake
- Slave River
  - Peace-Athabasca Delta
    - Athabasca River, Lake Athabasca, Riviere Des Roches, Chilloneys Creek, Revolution Coupe, Dempsey Creek, Peace River, Scow Channel, Murdock Creek, Darough Creek
  - Powder Creek
  - Leland Lakes
  - Hornaday River
- Hay River
  - Chinchaga River
    - Lennard Creek, Tanghe Creek, Werniuck Creek, Sloat Creek, Vader Creek, Thordarson Creek, Waniandy Creek, Haro River, Haig River
  - Meader River
  - Steen River
  - Melvin River
  - Little Hay River
- Liard Watershed (BC)
  - Petitot River
- Yates River

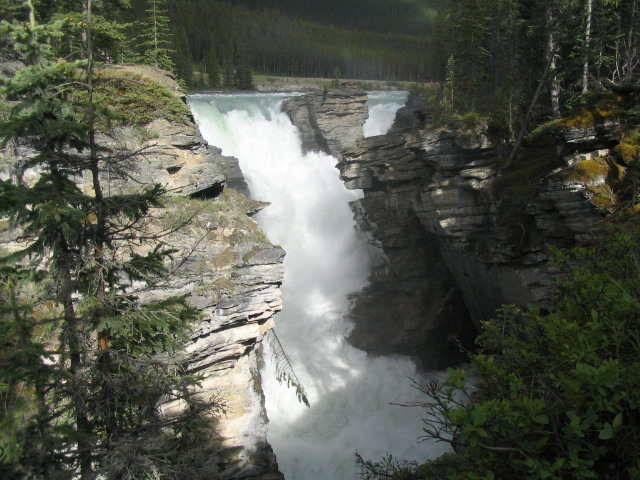
Athabasca Falls

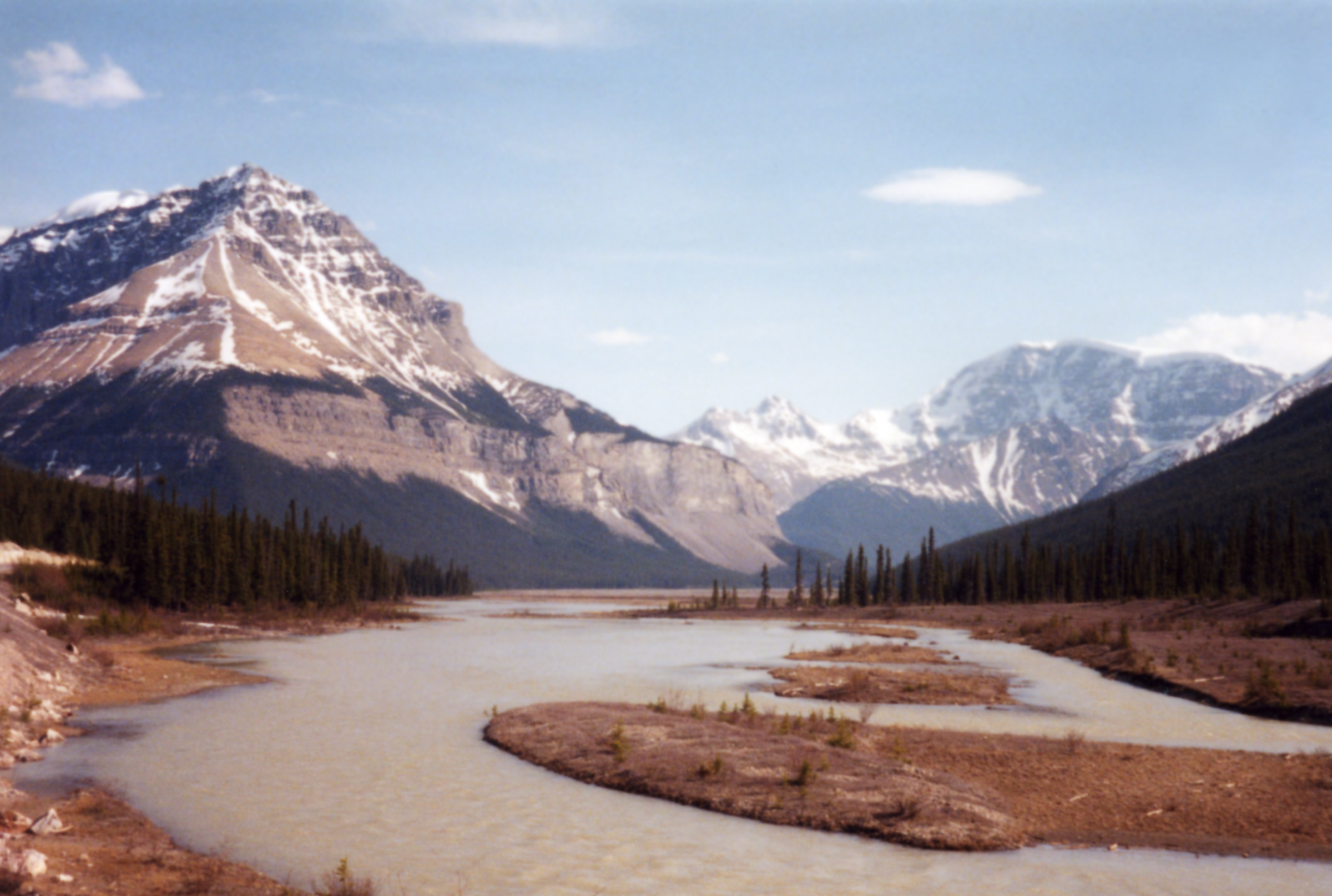
Athabasca River

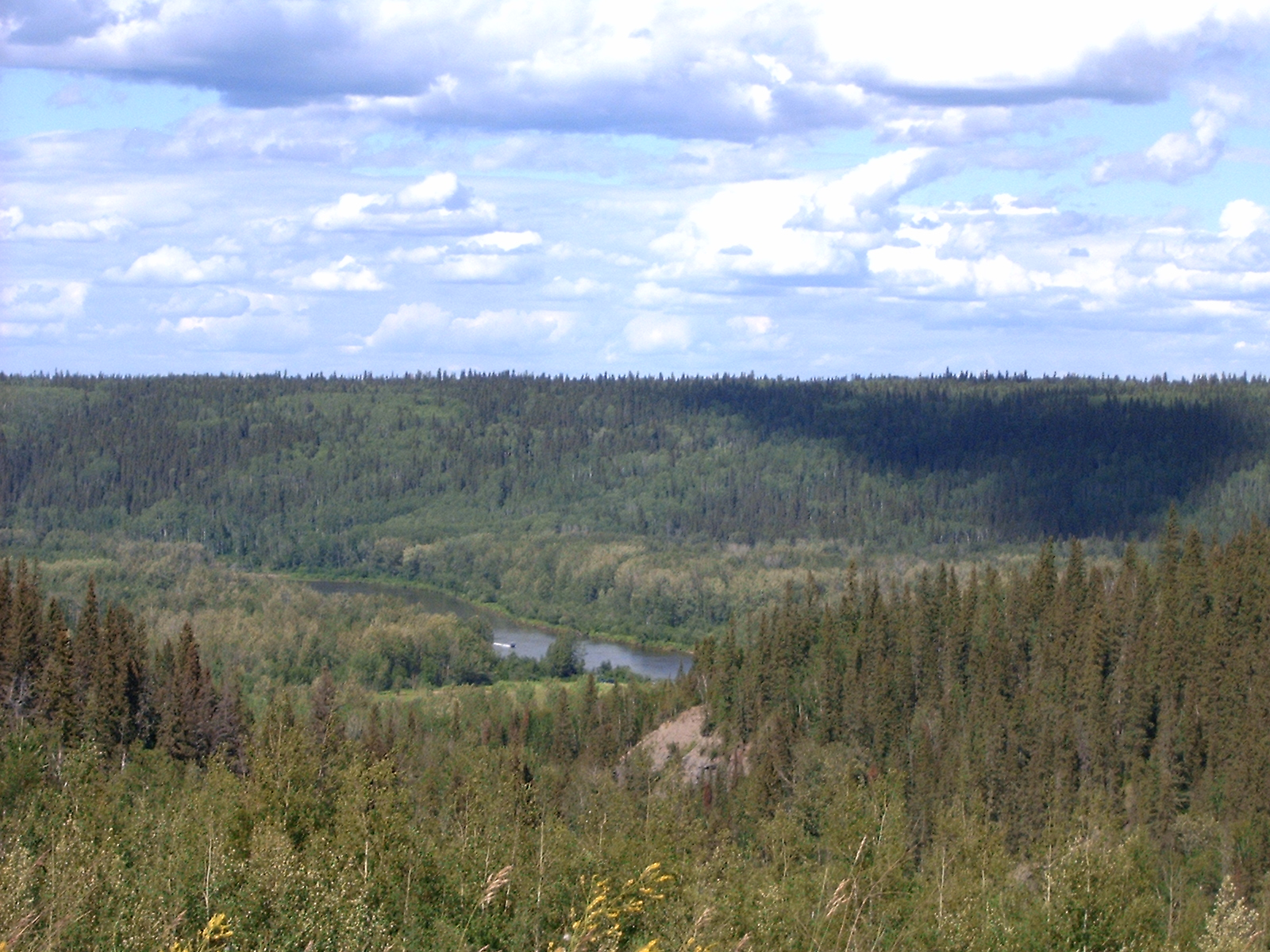
Clearwater River Valley

=== Hudson Bay watershed ===
Albertan Rivers in the Hudson Bay watershed are drained through Saskatchewan River, Lake Winnipeg and Nelson River, except for Beaver River, which is drained through Churchill River.

- North Saskatchewan River
  - Alexandra River
  - Howse River
    - Glacier River
  - Mistaya River
  - Siffleur River
    - Escarpment River
  - Cline River
  - Bighorn River
  - Ram River
    - North Ram River, Joyce River
  - Clearwater River
  - Baptiste River
  - Brazeau River
    - Nordegg River, Blackstone River, Chungo Creek, Elk River, Cardinal River, Southesk River, Cairn River
  - Sturgeon River
  - Redwater River
  - Death River
  - Vermilion River
  - Monnery River
  - Englishman River
  - Turtle Lake River
  - Jackfish River
  - Battle River
    - Pipestone Creek
    - Castor Creek
    - Eyehill Creek (flows into Manitou Lake)
      - Sounding Creek
  - Spruce River
  - Garden River
- South Saskatchewan River
  - Oldman River
    - Livingston River
    - Dutch Creek
    - Racehorse Creek
    - Crowsnest River
    - Castle River
      - South Castle River
      - West Castle River
      - Carbondale River
      - Mill Creek
    - Belly River
      - Waterton River
    - St. Mary River
    - Little Bow River
  - Bow River
    - Pipestone River
    - Spray River
    - Cascade River
    - Kananaskis River
    - Ghost River
    - Elbow River
      - Little Elbow River
    - Highwood River
      - Sheep River
  - Red Deer River
    - Panther River
      - Dormer River
    - James River
    - Raven River
    - Little Red Deer River
    - Medicine River
    - Blindman River
    - Rosebud River
    - Raven River
      - North Raven River
    - Blood Indian Creek
- Beaver River
  - Amisk River
  - Mooselake River
  - Sand River
    - Wolf River
  - Martineau River

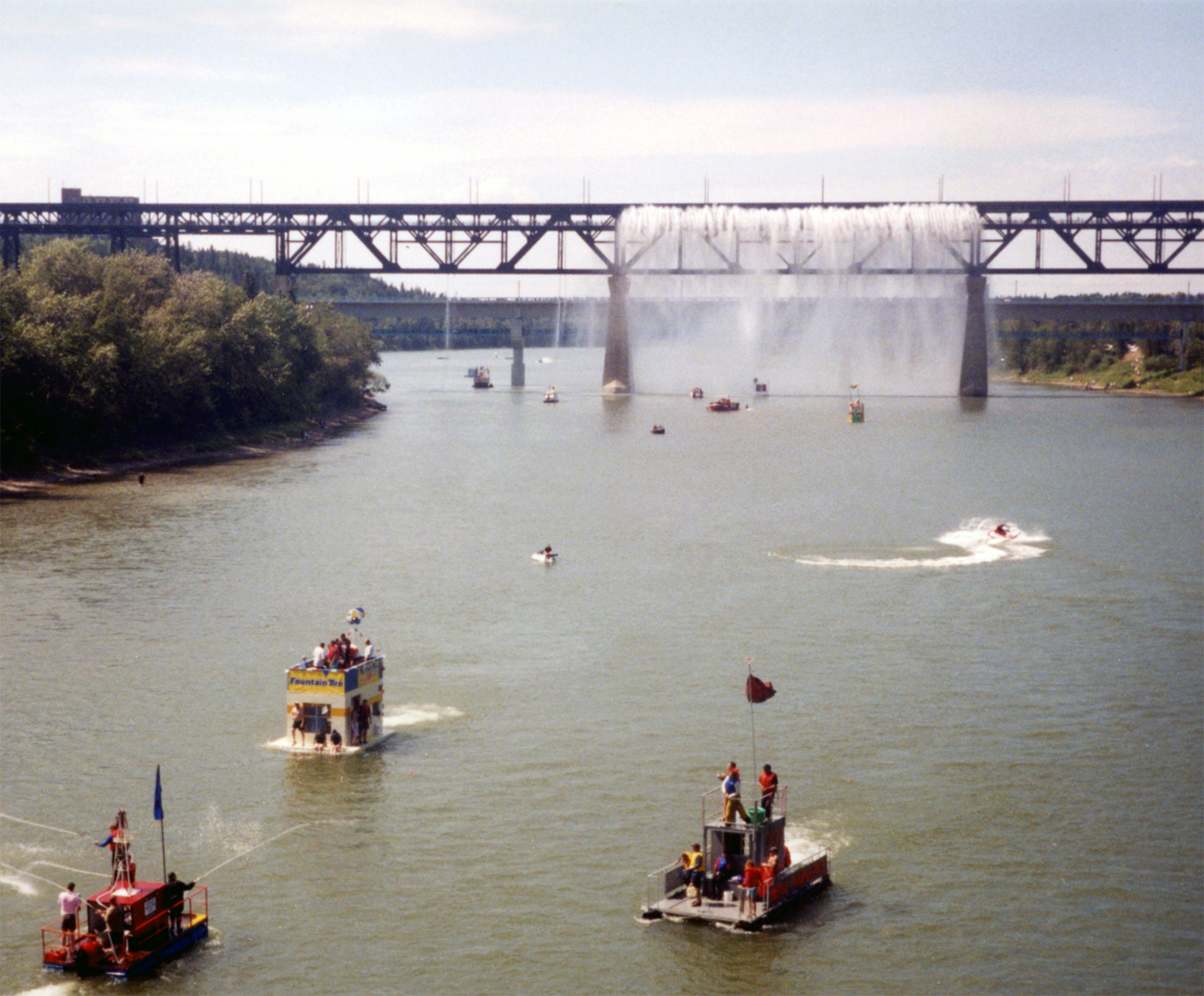
North Saskatchewan River

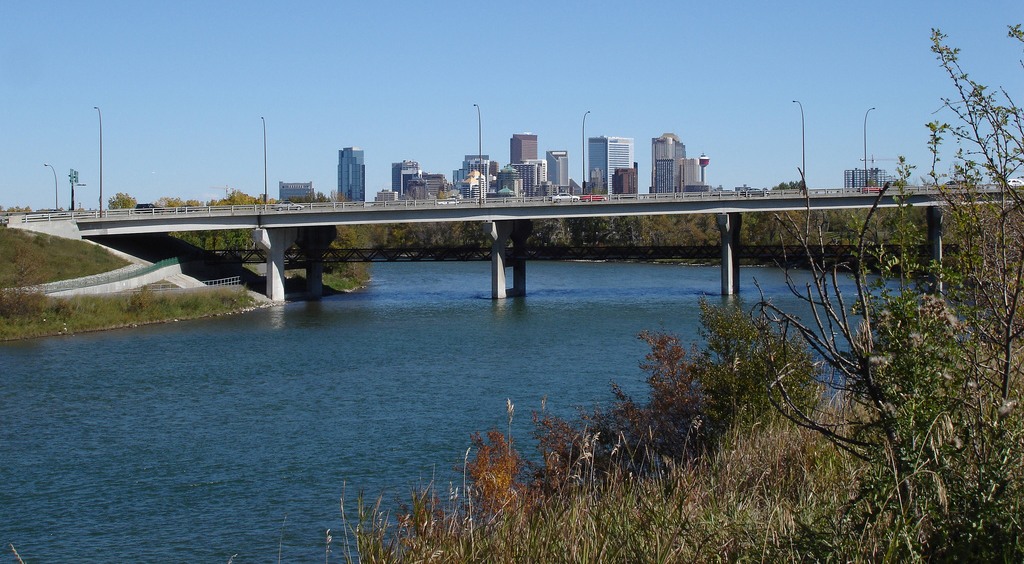
Bow River

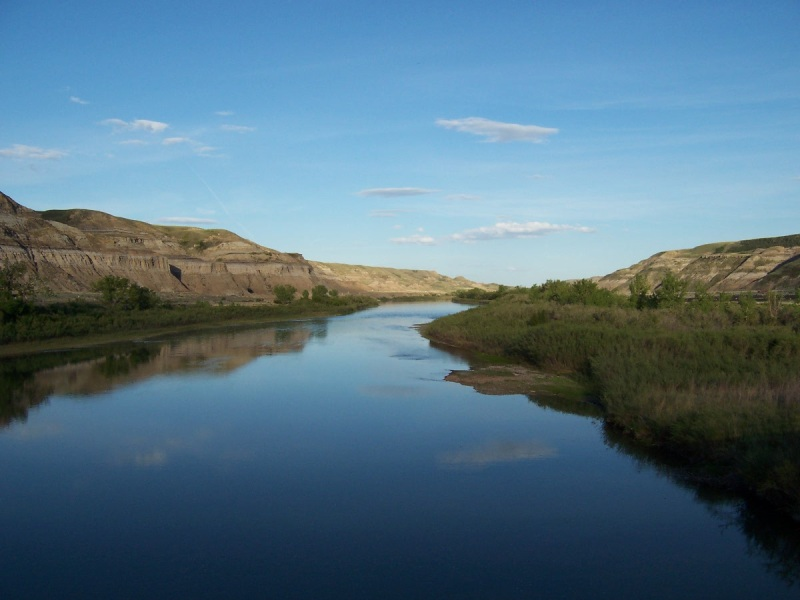
Red Deer River

=== Gulf of Mexico watershed ===
The small areas drained by the Milk River in southern Alberta and southwestern Saskatchewan as well as the Poplar River in southern Saskatchewan are the only areas in Canada that drain into the Gulf of Mexico.

- Missouri Watershed (United States)
  - Milk River
    - North Milk River
      - Shanks Lake Creek
    - Police Creek
    - Lodge Creek
    - Sage Creek
    - Willow Creek
    - Manyberries Creek (Pakowki Lake)
    - Battle Creek

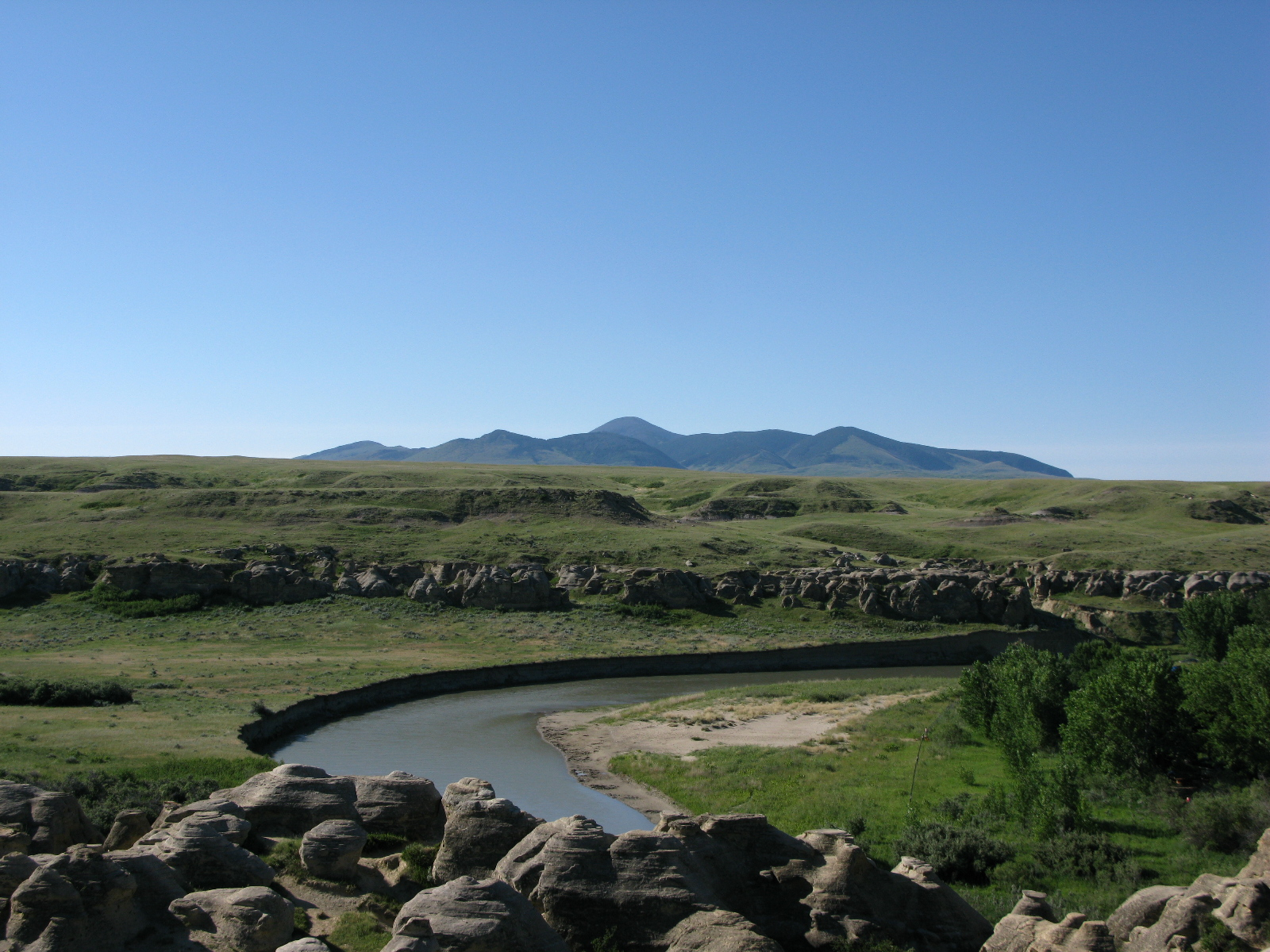
Milk River

== See also ==
- Rivers of the Americas
- Lakes of Alberta
- Geography of Alberta
- List of rivers of Canada
