= Whitehorse Wildland Provincial Park =

Protected area in west central Alberta, Canada

- IUCN category Ib (wilderness area)
- Location within Alberta Location within Canada Location within Yellowhead County
- Interactive map of Whitehorse Wildland Provincial Park
- Location: Yellowhead County, Alberta
- Nearest town: Cadomin, Alberta
- Coordinates: 52°59′42″N 117°27′18″W
- Area: 17,325.54 ha (66.8943 sq mi)
- Established: 26 August 1998
- Governing body: Alberta Parks

Whitehorse Wildland Provincial Park is a wildland provincial park in west-central Alberta, Canada. The park was established on 26 August 1998 and had an area of 17,439.886 hectares (43,094.90 acres; 67.34 sq mi). On 23 July 2002, the area was changed slightly to 17,325.54 ha (42,812.34 acres; 66.89 sq mi). The park is included in the Upper Athabasca Region Land Use Framework. The park is named for the creek within the boundaries of the park.

== Location ==
The park is in Yellowhead County in western Alberta, approximately 38 km (24 mi) southwest of Robb and 6 km (3.7 mi) south of Cadomin, Alberta. Jasper National Park borders the park to the west. Whitehorse Wildland is adjacent to Whitehorse Creek Provincial Recreation Area.

== Ecology ==
In the National Ecological Framework for Canada used by Environment and Climate Change Canada, the park is in the Luscar and Ram River Foothills ecodistricts of the Western Alberta Upland ecoregion in the Boreal Foothills ecoprovince of the Boreal Plains ecozone. Under the OneEarth classification (previously World Wildlife Fund), the park is in the Northern Rockies Conifer Forests ecoregion of the Greater Rockies & Mountain Forests bioregion.

=== Geography ===
The northern part of the park contains the watershed of the Whitehorse Creek and the ridges of foothills forming the valley for the creek. The northern ridge that bounds the Whitehorse Creek valley is the Nikanassin Range while the southern is the Miette Range. Within the park, in the Nikanassin Range are four mountains: Luscar Mountain at 2,606 m (8,550 ft) elevation, Leyland Mountain (2,545 m (8,350 ft)), Mount Gregg (2,530 m (8,300 ft)). and Mount Sir Harold Mitchell (2,514 m (8,248 ft)). The Miette Ranges contains several unnamed mountains 2,100 to 2,300 m (6,900 to 7,500 ft) in elevation. The southern arm of the park follows the Cardinal Divide Ridge. The Cardinal Divide, with an elevation of 2,025 m (6,644 ft), is the continental divide between two major watersheds: the McLeod and Athabasca Rivers, which eventually drain into the Arctic Ocean; and the Cardinal, Brazeau, and North Saskatchewan Rivers, which eventually drain into Hudson Bay. In the southern arm contains several named mountains: Prospect Mountain (2,819 m (9,249 ft)), Cheviot Mountain (2,720 m (8,920 ft)), and Tripoli Mountain (2,620 m (8,600 ft)). In addition, two mountains form the border with Jasper National Park and are thus partially in Whitehorse Wildland park: Blackface Mountain (2,867 m (9,406 ft)) and Climax Mountain (2,823 m (9,262 ft)). The elevation of Whitehorse Creek when it leaves the park is 1,600 m (5,200 ft). There is an extensive trail network in the park for hiking and horseback trail riding.

=== Climate ===
The Köppen climate classification of the park is Continental, Subarctic (Dfc) characterized by long, cold winters, and short, warm to cool summers. Using the data from a nearby weather stations (Luscar Creek), average daily temperatures for 1991 to 2020 exceeds 10 °C (50 °F) only for June, July, and August while average daily temperatures are less than 0 °C (32 °F) for November through March. At Luscar Creek, the long-run average precipitation from 1991 to 2020 for the wettest months, June and July, is 100 to 110 mm (3.9 to 4.3 in) per month; conversely, the station receive less than 40 mm (1.6 in) per month from October through March.

=== Natural history ===
The park is home to many wildlife species. Ungulates include bighorn sheep, elk, moose, and mule deer. Carnivores include grizzly bears, wolves, and cougars. Among the small mammals are hoary marmots and American pikas. The park also provides breeding habitat for harlequin ducks which are dependent on the fast-flowing mountain streams for nesting and rearing their young.

Cadomin Cave, located just south of Cadomin, is an extensive limestone cave system providing important bat habitat and is one of only four major bat hibernacula in Alberta.

== Activities ==
Front country camping is available at the adjacent Whitehorse Creek Provincial Recreation Area. Whitehorse Wildland has four designated backcountry campgrounds, as well as random backcountry camping. The extensive trail system allows for hiking, horesback trail riding, and mountain biking. Also found are geocaching and wildlife viewing. Hunting is permitted when licensed.

== See also ==
- List of provincial parks in Alberta
- List of Canadian provincial parks
