= Arctic Divide =

An 1857 map showing the Hudson Bay drainage basin in Canada in green. Its northern boundary is the Arctic Divide.

The Arctic Divide is the continental divide between the watersheds of the Arctic Ocean and Hudson Bay. It thus forms the northern boundary of the Hudson Bay drainage basin, and historically of Rupert's Land. It traverses what is today Western and Northern Canada.

The major watersheds to its northwest are those of the Mackenzie River mostly via the Athabasca River, and of the Back River. The major watersheds to its southeast are those of the Nelson River via the North Saskatchewan River, the Churchill River, and the Thelon River. The divide is interrupted by Wollaston Lake, the world's largest natural bifurcation lake, which has distributaries that drain to both oceans.

The divide was a barrier to the expansion of the North American fur trade, which largely used canoe routes. Although the divide was made the border of Rupert's Land in 1670, it wasn't until the late 18th century that it was actually mapped by explorers of European descent with the assistance of Indigenous guides. In the early 19th century, the major trade routes across the divide were the Fort Assiniboine–Fort Edmonton road, Lac La Biche Portage, and Methye Portage.

== History ==
The first people to cross the Arctic Divide were Paleo-Indians during the initial peopling of the Americas. These indigenous peoples established numerous trade and migration routes that crossed the divide.

After the 1668–1669 expedition of the English merchant ship Nonsuch, a 1670 charter formed the Hudson's Bay Company and granted it the territory of Rupert's Land, defined as all land draining into the waters within and beyond the Hudson Strait. This gave legal significance to the continental divide between the Arctic Ocean and Hudson Bay, although at the time its location was unknown. Exploration and settlement centered around the fur trade, and in Western Canada this initially focused on the beaver-rich mixed forest on the northern and eastern fringes of the Canadian Prairies.

Explorers of European descent began to encounter the divide in the late 18th century. Samuel Hearne, traveling with a Chipewyan group led by Matonabbee, was the first European to reach the Arctic Ocean over land from the continent's east coast in his 1770–1772 journey, which traveled from Churchill to the mouth of the Coppermine River and crossed the Arctic Divide to the east of Great Slave Lake. Peter Pond crossed the Methye Portage, already a traditional Indigenous route, on behalf of the newly formed North West Company in 1778; this led to expansion of the fur trade by several competing groups into the area around and beyond Lake Athabasca in what became known as the North-Western Territory. In 1796, David Thompson crossed the divide at Wollaston Lake upon the advice of Chipewyan guides in his party. Two years later, he traversed the portage at Lac La Biche. In 1825, a road was constructed in the prairies between Fort Edmonton and Fort Assiniboine, becoming a major route across the divide; it was in 1875 supplanted by the Athabasca Landing Trail slightly farther east.

Exploration proceeded such that a 1796 map by Aaron Arrowsmith notes the divide at a single point, the "Lands Height" across the Methye Portage, while an 1809 map by Arrowhead shows the divide through much of the continent. In 1821, the North West Company was merged into the Hudson's Bay Company, its jurisdiction was extended into the North-Western Territory. In 1870, Rupert's Land and the North-Western Territory were combined and transferred to become the Northwest Territories of Canada shortly after its Confederation, removing the divide as a legal boundary.

Historical sources refer to the divide as the "height of land" or related terms. The term "Arctic Divide" is used in modern times. However, the term is also used for the unrelated northernmost part of the Great Divide in Alaska.

== Route ==
=== Alberta ===
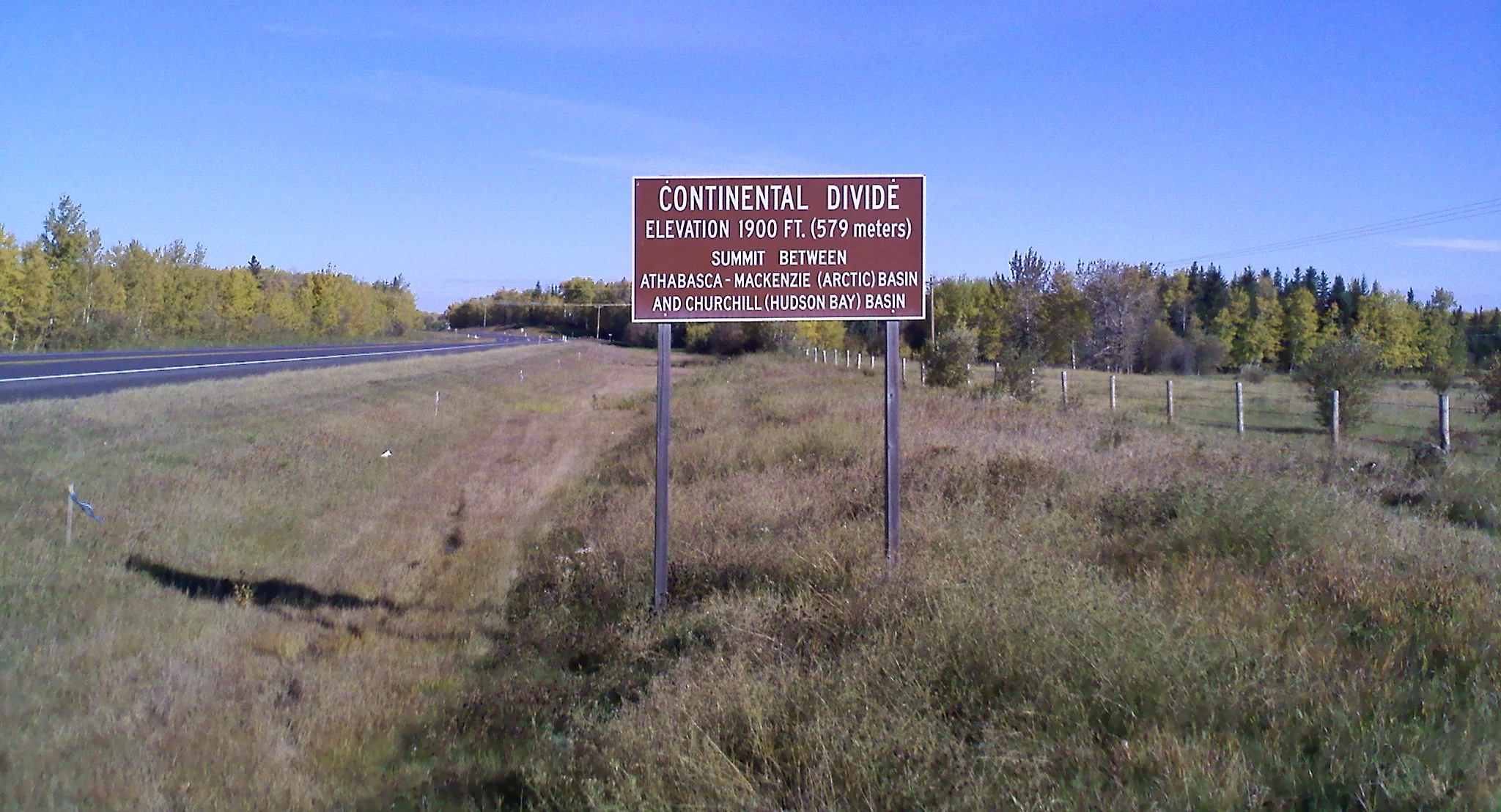
Sign marking the Arctic Divide on Alberta Highway 36 and 55 south of Lac La Biche, Alberta in 2010

The Arctic Divide's southwestern end is at the summit of Snow Dome on the border between British Columbia and Alberta, where it diverges from the Great Divide. Glaciers from the surrounding Columbia Icefield give rise to the headwaters of the Athabasca River to the north, which ultimately flows to the Mackenzie River and Arctic Ocean; and of the North Saskatchewan River to the south, which ultimately flows to the Nelson River and Hudson Bay.

The divide crosses the peak of Mount Athabasca and then descends to Sunwapta Pass, where it crosses Icefields Parkway. It then ascends to the summit of Nigel Peak, and then passes through or near the summits of Sunwapta Peak, Poboktan Mountain, Mount Brazeau, Maligne Mountain, Mount Southesk, Mount La Grace, Mount Cardinal, Blackface Mountain, Cheviot Mountain, and Redcap Mountain.

The divide then crosses from the Canadian Rockies into cultivated lands of the Canadian Prairies to the west and north of Edmonton. It initially parallels the Pembina River to its north, crossing the Yellowhead Highway between Entwistle and Magnolia Bridge. It crosses Alberta Highway 2 near Nestow. Just west of Long Lake, the southern watershed of the divide switches from the Nelson River to the Churchill River. The divide than traverses the isthmus between Lac La Biche and Beaver Lake.

From this point forward, the divide traverses remote boreal forest and is traversed by few roads. The divide passes through the Dillon River Wildland Provincial Park and then remains in the vicinity of the Alberta–Saskatchewan border, crossing it five times. In its northernmost stretch in Alberta, it crosses the proposed route of Alberta Highway 956 and then passes through the Gipsy-Gordon Wildland Park between Gipsy Lake and Garson Lake.

=== Saskatchewan ===
In Saskatchewan, the Arctic Divide crosses the Methye Portage between the Clearwater River and Lac La Loche. It crosses Saskatchewan Highway 955 in this area. It then passes to the south of Cree Lake.

The divide is interrupted at the watershed of Wollaston Lake and its main tributary, the Geikie River. Wollaston Lake is the world's largest natural bifurcation lake whose water exits both through the Fond du Lac River ultimately to the Arctic Ocean, and the Cochrane River ultimately to Hudson Bay. Saskatchewan Highway 914 terminates in this region and Saskatchewan Highway 905 crosses through it. The Canadian National Hydro Network map assigns a work unit boundary going through the lake that is sometimes confused for a watershed divide despite the fact that water freely exchanges through all areas of the lake and that work units do not necessarily reflect watershed boundaries.

In the northeasternmost part of Saskatchewan, the southern watershed of the divide switches from the Churchill River to the Thelon River.

=== Northwest Territories and Nunavut ===
The Arctic Divide takes a roughly north–south path through the remote eastern part of the Northwest Territories. The path includes an isthmus between Selwyn Lake and Wholdaia Lake. It crosses the tree line into the tundra, and then passes just to the east of Artillery Lake. Just to its north, the northern watershed of the divide switches from the Mackenzie River to the Back River.

After passing into Nunavut, the Arctic Divide passes successively to the north of the settlements of Baker Lake, Wager Bay, and Naujaat. It then traverses the western side of the Melville Peninsula, separating shorter rivers flowing into the Gulf of Boothia or Foxe Basin, until it reaches Fury and Hecla Strait.

The Baffin Island drainage divide, which separates the watersheds of Foxe Basin to the south from Baffin Bay to the north, may be considered part of the Arctic Divide. This divide begins at Fury and Hecla Strait and crosses a plateau to the west of the Gifford River and east of Saputing Lake, Admiralty Inlet, and Tasiujaq Sound. It then follows the central part of the Baffin Mountains, during which it crosses the Barnes Ice Cap. It then turns southwards, separating the Great Plain of the Koukdjuak from the areas around Cumberland Sound and Frobisher Bay. It then passes through the middle of the Meta Incognita Peninsula to its southeasternmost point at the edge of the Hudson Strait.
