= Fiddle River =

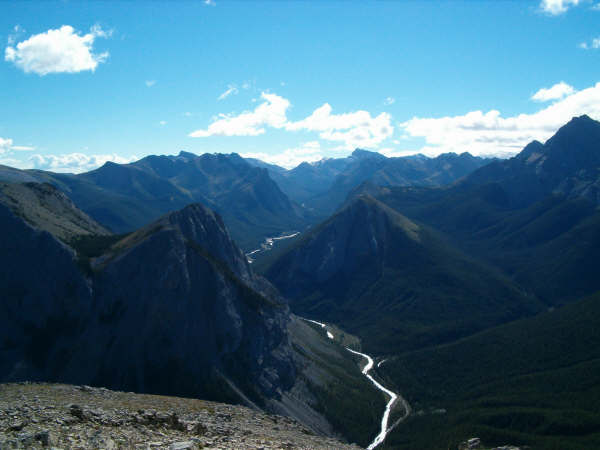
- The Fiddle River in Jasper National Park

Location
- Country: Canada
- Province: Alberta

Physical characteristics
- Source
  - location: Fiddle Pass
  - coordinates: 53°01′47″N 117°30′44″W
  - elevation: 2,058 m (6,752 ft)
- Mouth
  - location: Athabasca River
  - coordinates: 53°13′52.1″N 117°51′33.1″W
  - elevation: 997 m (3,271 ft)

The Fiddle River is a medium-sized tributary of the Athabasca River, flowing into the river near the east gate of Jasper National Park in Alberta, Canada. The Fiddle River forms at the base of Fiddle Pass, with meltwater from Mount Bryant, Mount Gregg, Mount Sir Harold Mitchel, and Mount Barry. The river flows in a general northeast direction before its confluence with the Athabasca. The Fiddle River parallels the road to the popular Miette Hot Springs for a portion of its course.

There are two competing stories for the naming of the Fiddle River (as well as Fiddle Peak, Fiddle Pass, and the Fiddle Range). The first contends that wind flowing over the Fiddle Range with a certain speed and direction mimicks the sound of a #4 fiddle string. The second story argues that the outline of the range resembles that of a violin. The name Fiddle River first appeared in 1846.

== Tributaries ==
- Poachers Creek
- Slide Creek
- Sulphur Creek
- O'Hagan Creek
- Mystery Creek
- Villeneuve Creek
- Morris Creek
- Ashlar Creek

== See also ==
- List of Alberta rivers
