= Roche Miette =

Mountain in Jasper National Park, Alberta, Canada

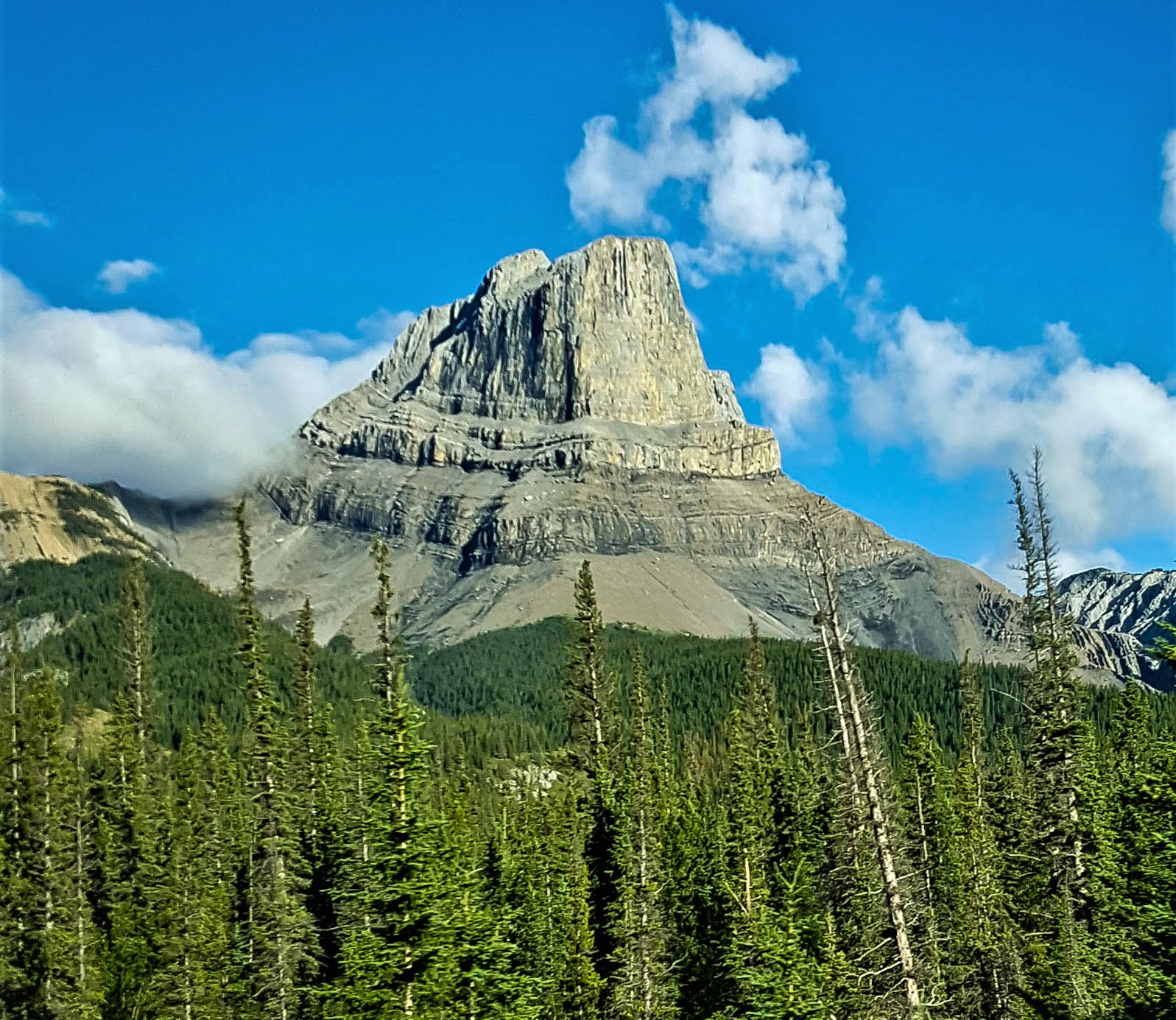
- Roche Miette

Highest point
- Elevation: 2,316 m (7,598 ft)
- Prominence: 45 m (148 ft)
- Listing: Mountains of Alberta
- Coordinates: 53°09′48″N 117°55′11″W

Geography
- Location within Alberta Location within Canada
- Interactive map of Roche Miette
- Location: Jasper National Park; Alberta, Canada
- Parent range: Miette Range; Canadian Rockies
- Topo map: NTS 83F4 Miette

Geology
- Rock type: sedimentary rock

Climbing
- Easiest route: Scrambling

Roche Miette (/rɒʃ maɪˈɛt/) is a 2,316-metre (7,598-foot) mountain at the northwestern tip of the Miette Range in Jasper National Park, in the Canadian Rockies of Alberta, Canada. The peak is a prominent landmark in the Athabasca Valley that is situated approximately 30 km (19 mi) north-northeast of the municipality of Jasper, and 4 km (2.5 mi) northeast of the Jasper House National Historic Site. It is visible from Highway 16 and the Canadian. Its nearest higher peak is Capitol Mountain, 5 km (3.1 mi) to the southeast. Roche Miette translates from French as Crumb Rock.

== History ==
According to James Hector and folklore, Bonhomme Miette, a French Canadian voyageur and gifted fiddler, made the first ascent by climbing it from its south side. (The Fiddle River and Fiddle Range are located immediately northeast of Roche Miette and Miette Range.)

In 1907 Arthur P. Coleman wrote of it: "The most impressive bit of architecture along the Athabasca, pushing its bold front out into the valley like a commanding fort with unscalable walls three thousand feet high, and a flat top somewhat parapeted and loop-holed."

The mountain's name was officially adopted in 1956 by the Geographical Names Board of Canada.

== Geology ==
Roche Miette is composed of sedimentary rock laid down during the Precambrian to Jurassic periods and later pushed east and over the top of younger rock during the Laramide orogeny. The summit block is made of Palliser Formation limestone.

== Climate ==
Based on the Köppen climate classification, Roche Miette is in a subarctic climate with cold, snowy winters, and mild summers. Temperatures can drop below −20 °C with wind chill factors below −30 °C. In terms of favourable weather, June through September are the best months to climb. Precipitation runoff from Roche Miette drains into the Athabasca River.

== Gallery ==
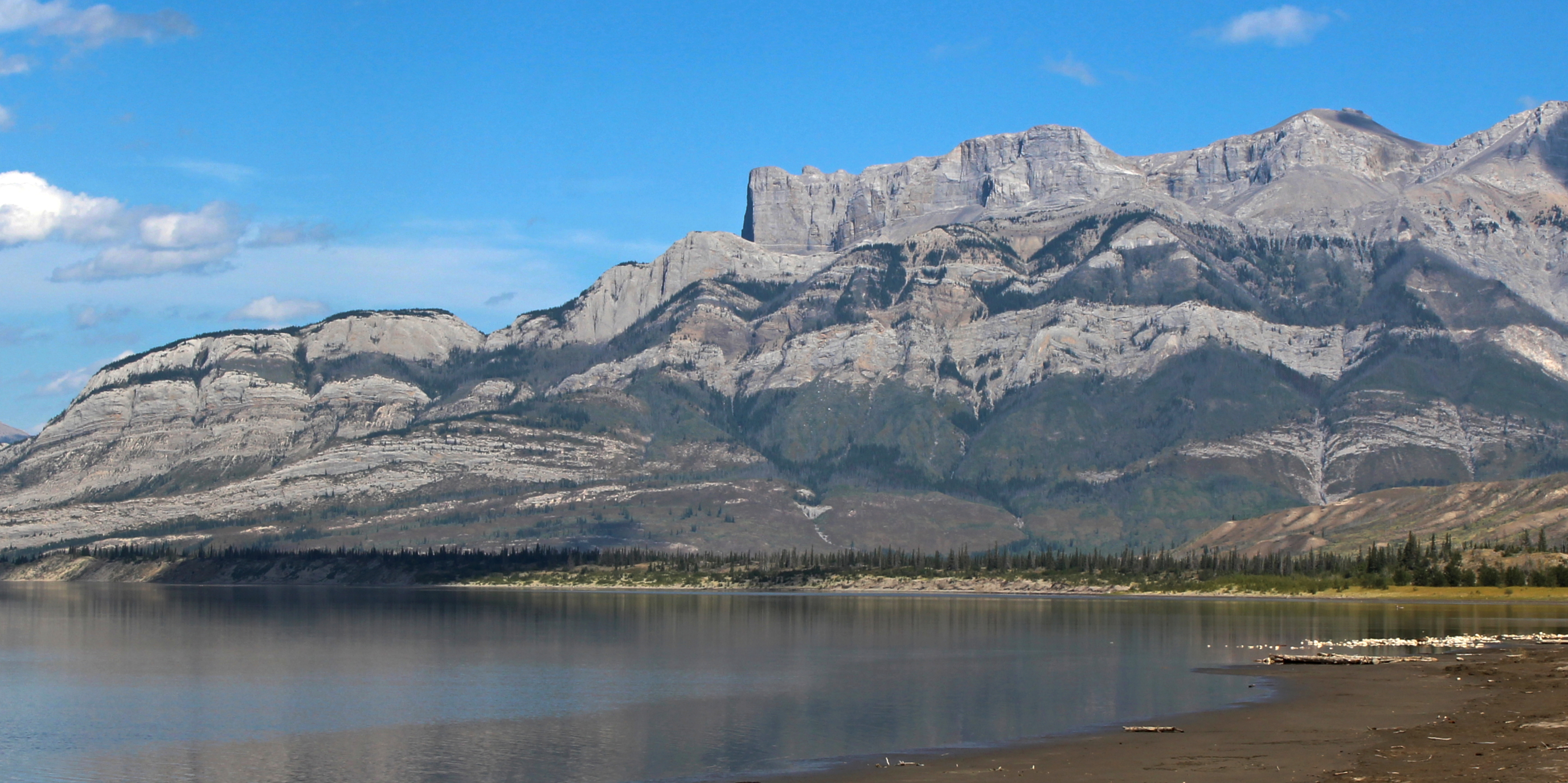
Looking northeast at Roche Miette from Highway 16

== See also ==
- Geography of Alberta
- Scrambles in the Canadian Rockies
