= Cardinal River =

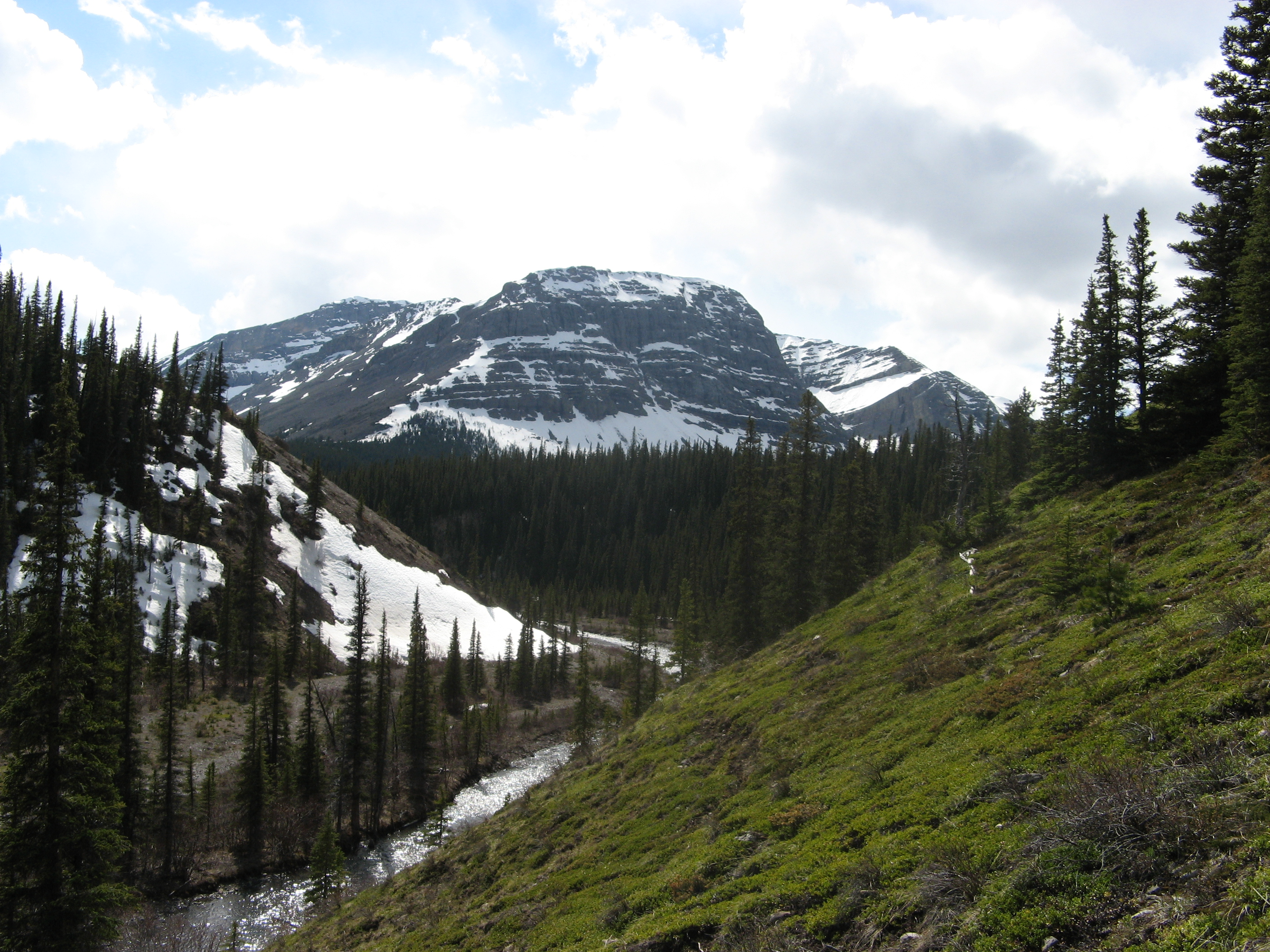
- Cardinal River from the Rocky Pass Trail

Location
- Country: Canada
- Province: Alberta

Physical characteristics
- Source
  - location: Cardinal River Headwaters
  - coordinates: 52°54′02″N 117°23′02″W
  - elevation: 2,224 m (7,297 ft)
- Mouth
  - location: Brazeau River
  - coordinates: 52°51′52″N 116°35′15″W
  - elevation: 1,288 m (4,226 ft)

Cardinal River is a short river in western Alberta, Canada. It flows from the Canadian Rockies, and empties into the Brazeau River, itself a major tributary of the North Saskatchewan River.

At its origin, just east of Jasper National Park, the Cardinal River forms in a basin between Tripoli, Cheviot, Prospect, Climax, and Blackface Mountains, as well as Mount Cardinal, in the Nikanassin Range. From there it flows east, through the eastern slopes of the Canadian Rockies and into the foothills. A portion of Grave Flats Road follows the river before it reaches the Bighorn Highway, where it empties into the Brazeau River south of Pembina Forks.

The Cardinal river and other surrounding landmarks are named for Jacques Cardinal, a local fur trader. His grave is located on the banks of the river.

== Tributaries ==
- Toma Creek
- Russell Creek
- Nomad Creek
- Ruby Creek
  - Ruby Lakes, Flapjack Lake, Flapjack Creek
- Grave Creek
- Muskiki Creek
  - Muskiki Lake

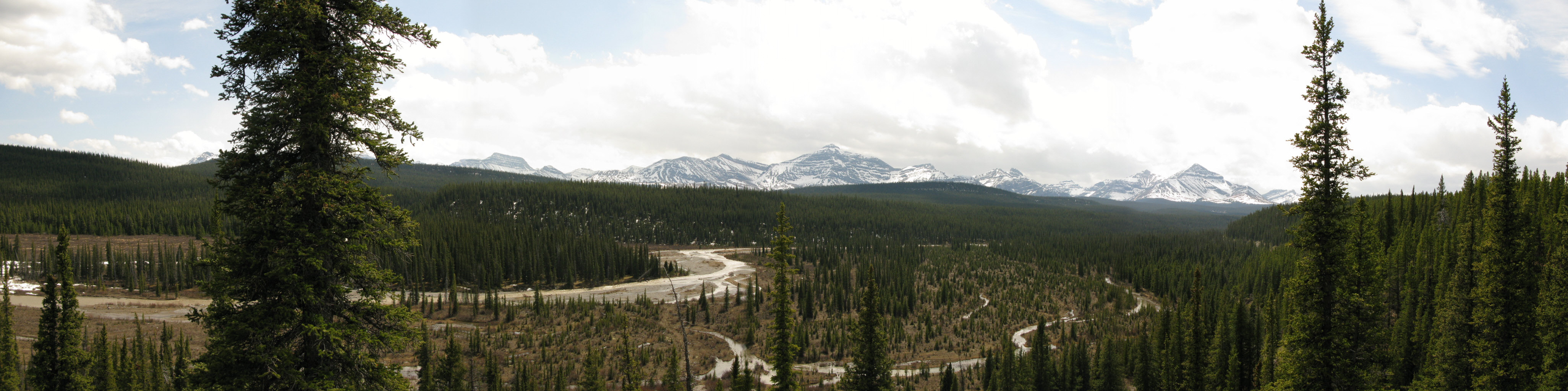
The Cardinal River from the Cardinal River Road

== See also ==
- List of Alberta rivers
