= Nikanassin Range =

Mountain range in Alberta, Canada

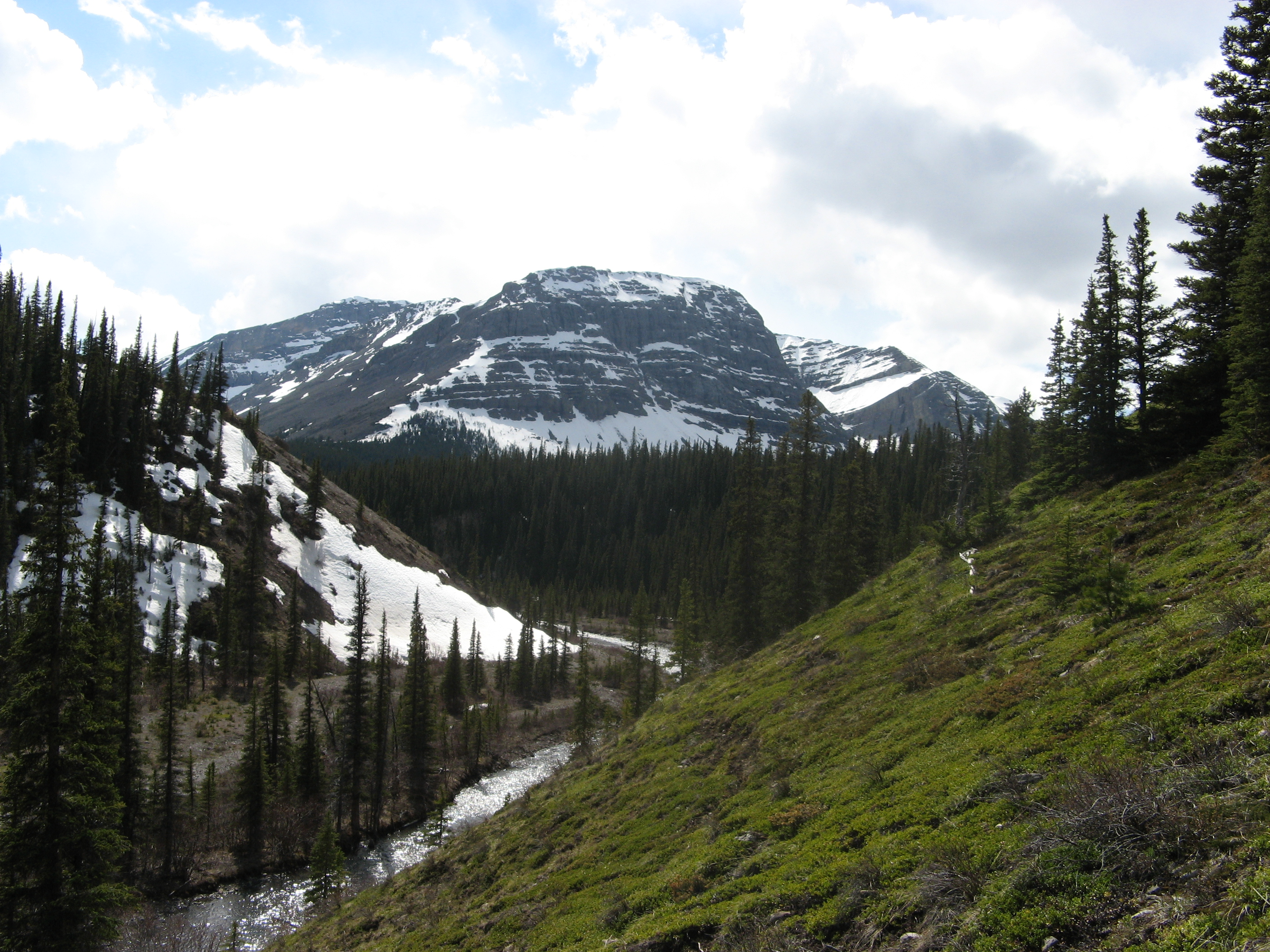
- Cardinal River flowing east through the Nikanassin Range

Highest point
- Peak: Blackface Mountain
- Elevation: 2,867 m (9,406 ft)
- Listing: Mountains of Alberta
- Coordinates: 52°53′58″N 117°24′36″W

Dimensions
- Length: 80 km (50 mi) W-E
- Width: 66 km (41 mi) N-S
- Area: 2,760 km^{2} (1,070 mi^{2})

Geography
- Location within Alberta
- Country: Canada
- Province: Alberta
- Range coordinates: 53°04′N 117°34′W
- Parent range: Canadian Rockies
- Topo map: NTS 83F4 Miette

The Nikanassin Range is a group of mountain ranges in the Canadian Rockies on the eastern edge of Jasper National Park in Alberta, Canada. It is developed south-east of the Fiddle Range, and one of the front ranges. Nikanassin means "first range" in Cree.

The range has an extent of 2,760 square kilometres (1,070 sq mi), with a length of 80 kilometres (50 mi) from north-west to south-east, and a width of 66 kilometres (41 mi). Its highest point is Blackface Mountain, with a height of 2,867 metres (9,406 ft).

Numerous seams of coal are found in this range, with past and present mines at Cadomin, Mountain Park and Luscar.

The range gives the name to the Nikanassin Formation, a stratigraphical unit of late Jurassic age that has its stratotype in this region.

== Peaks ==
Mountain/Peak	Elevation (m/ft)		Location
Blackface Mountain	2,867	9,406	52°53′58″N 117°24′36″W
Climax Mountain	2,823	9,262	52°54′17″N 117°25′16″W
Deception Mountain	2,819	9,249	52°52′09″N 117°23′51″W
Mount Lindsay	2,743	8,999	52°51′36″N 117°22′26″W
Mount Bryant	2,621	8,599	53°01′00″N 117°34′41″W
Overturn Mountain	2,560	8,400	53°03′15″N 117°42′11″W

== Gallery ==
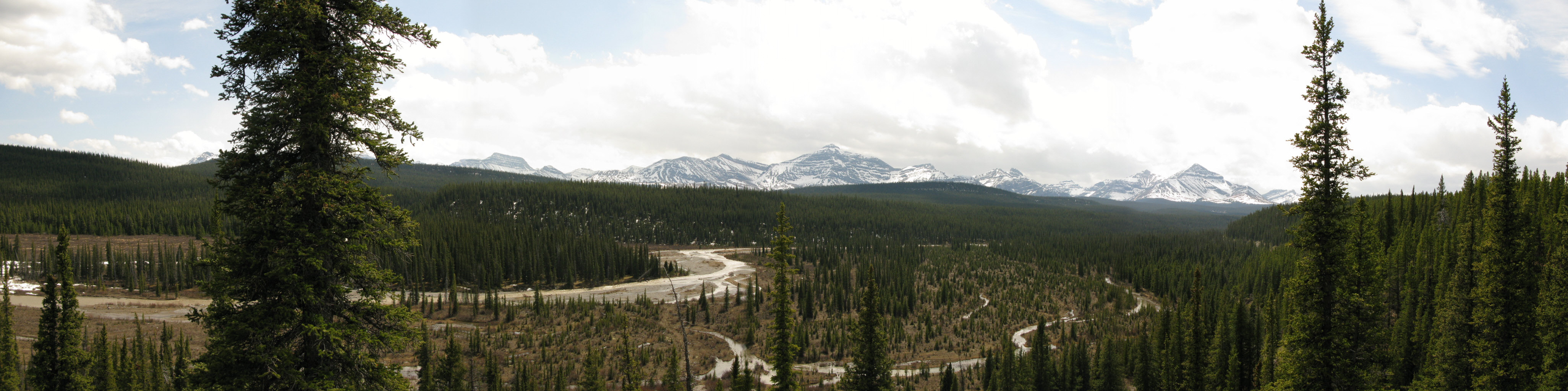
Nikanassin Range over the foothills

== See also ==
- Ranges of the Canadian Rockies
