= Whitehorse Creek =

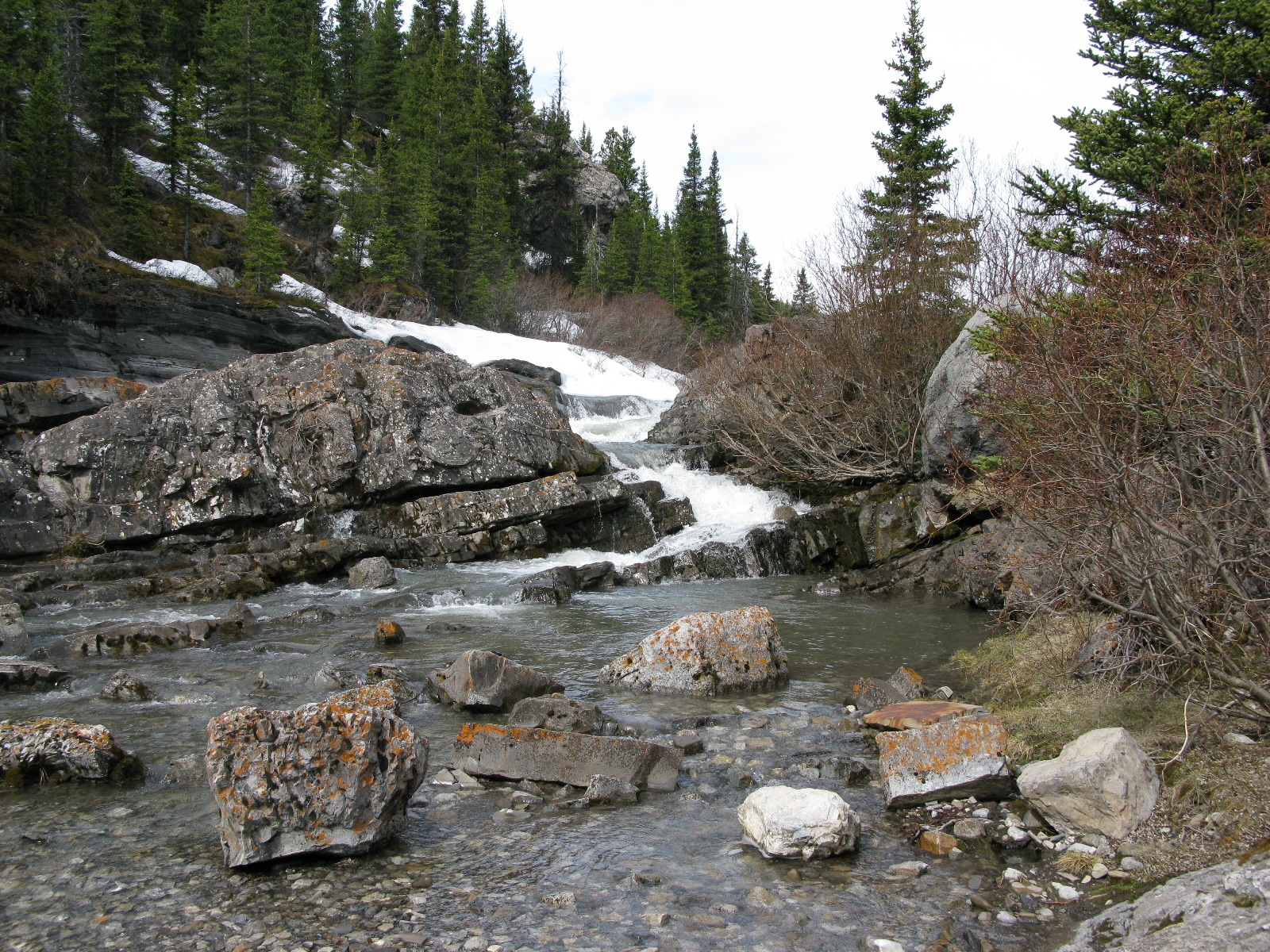
- Whitehorse Creek

Location
- Country: Canada
- Province: Alberta

Physical characteristics
- Source
  - location: Whitehorse Creek Headwaters
  - coordinates: 53°00′00″N 117°31′35″W
  - elevation: 2,118 m (6,949 ft)
- Mouth
  - location: Mcleod River
  - coordinates: 52°58′59″N 117°20′19″W
  - elevation: 1,592 m (5,223 ft)

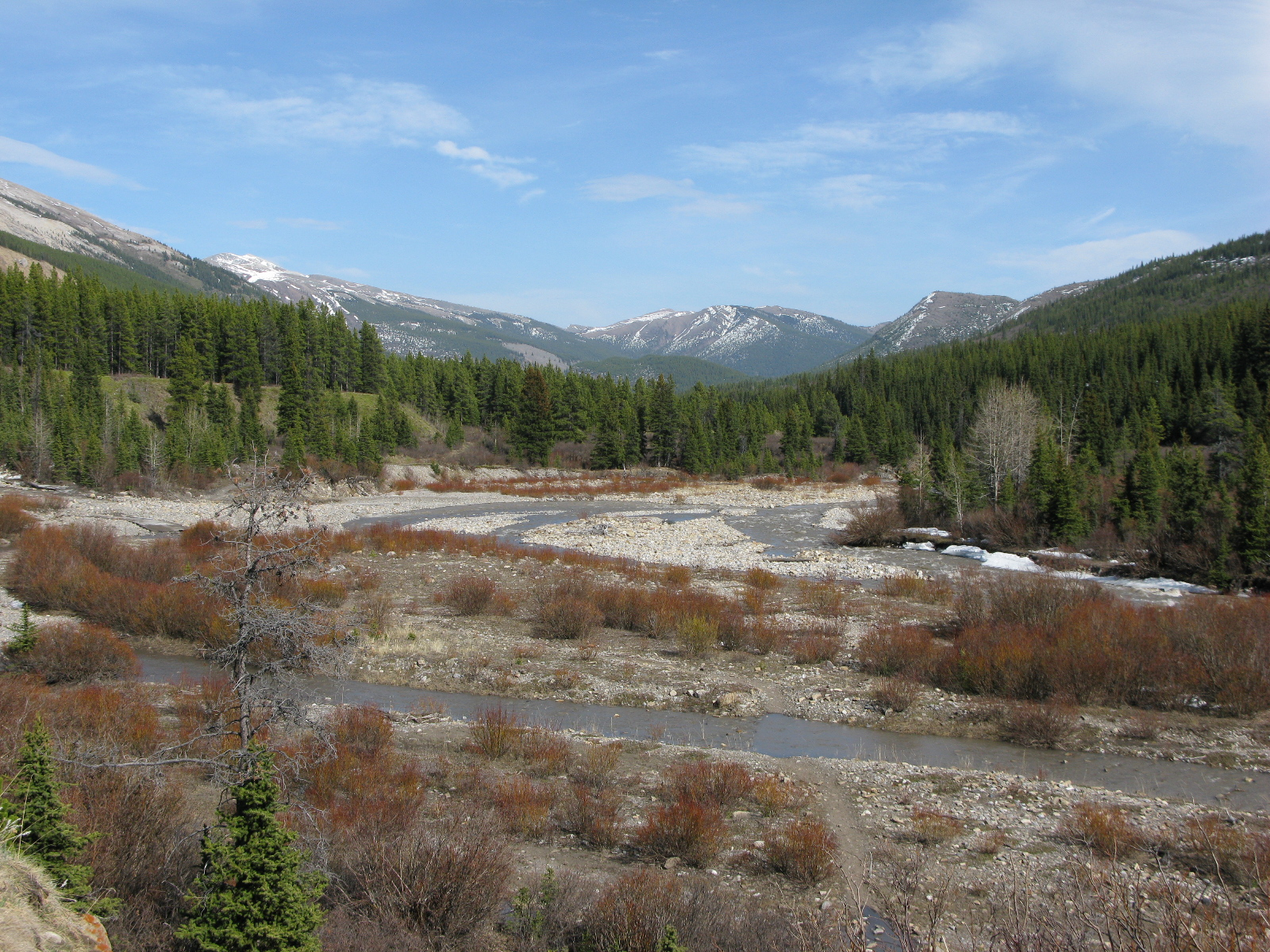
Whitehorse Creek

Whitehorse Creek is a significant stream in west-central Alberta, Canada. It flows from the Canadian Rockies, and is the first major tributary of the McLeod River, a major tributary of the Athabasca River.

At its origin, inside Whitehorse Wildland Provincial Park located just east of Jasper National Park, Whitehorse Creek forms from the meltwater of Mount Gregg and Mount Bryant. The creek flows east, taking on the tributaries of Harlequin Creek and Drummond Creek, before its confluence into the Mcleod River on the east side of the Whitehorse Creek Provincial Recreation Area. The elevation of Whitehorse Creek at its confluence with the McLeod is 1,600 m (5,200 ft). Whitehorse Wildland Provincial Park includes a trail network for hiking and horseback trail riding.

== See also ==
- List of Alberta rivers
