= Roche à Perdrix =

Mountain in Alberta, Canada

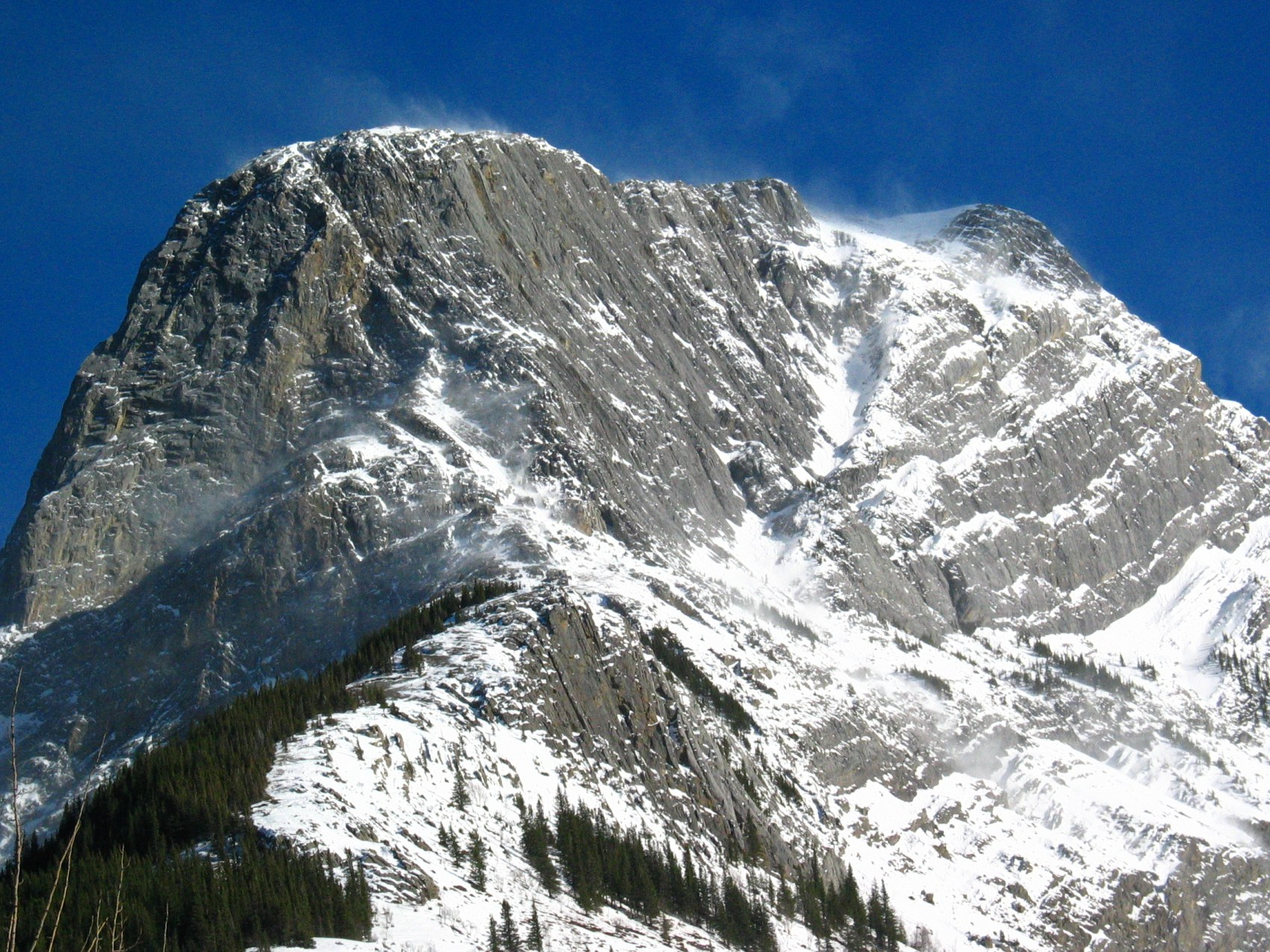

Highest point
- Elevation: 2,134 m (7,001 ft)
- Prominence: 168 m (551 ft)
- Listing: Mountains of Alberta
- Coordinates: 53°12′49″N 117°48′14″W

Geography
- Location within Alberta Location within Canada
- Country: Canada
- Province: Alberta
- Protected area: Jasper National Park
- Parent range: Fiddle Range
- Topo map: NTS 83F4 Miette

Climbing
- Easiest route: moderate scramble

Roche à Perdrix is a mountain in Alberta's Rockies, Canada.

It is located south of Highway 16 on the eastern border of Jasper National Park, and is part of the Fiddle Range, one of the easternmost ranges of the Canadian Rockies. It is one of the first mountains upon entering the park from the east and is directly on the park border. In French, perdrix means partridge and roche means rock. The name is a reference to the rock foliations, which resemble a partridge's tail feathers.

It was named by the Reverend George Grant in 1872.

== Climate ==
Based on the Köppen climate classification, it is in a subarctic climate with cold, snowy winters, and mild summers. Temperatures can drop below −20 °C with wind chill factors below −30 °C. In terms of favourable weather, June through September are the best months to climb. Precipitation runoff from the mountain flows into the Athabasca River.

== Gallery ==
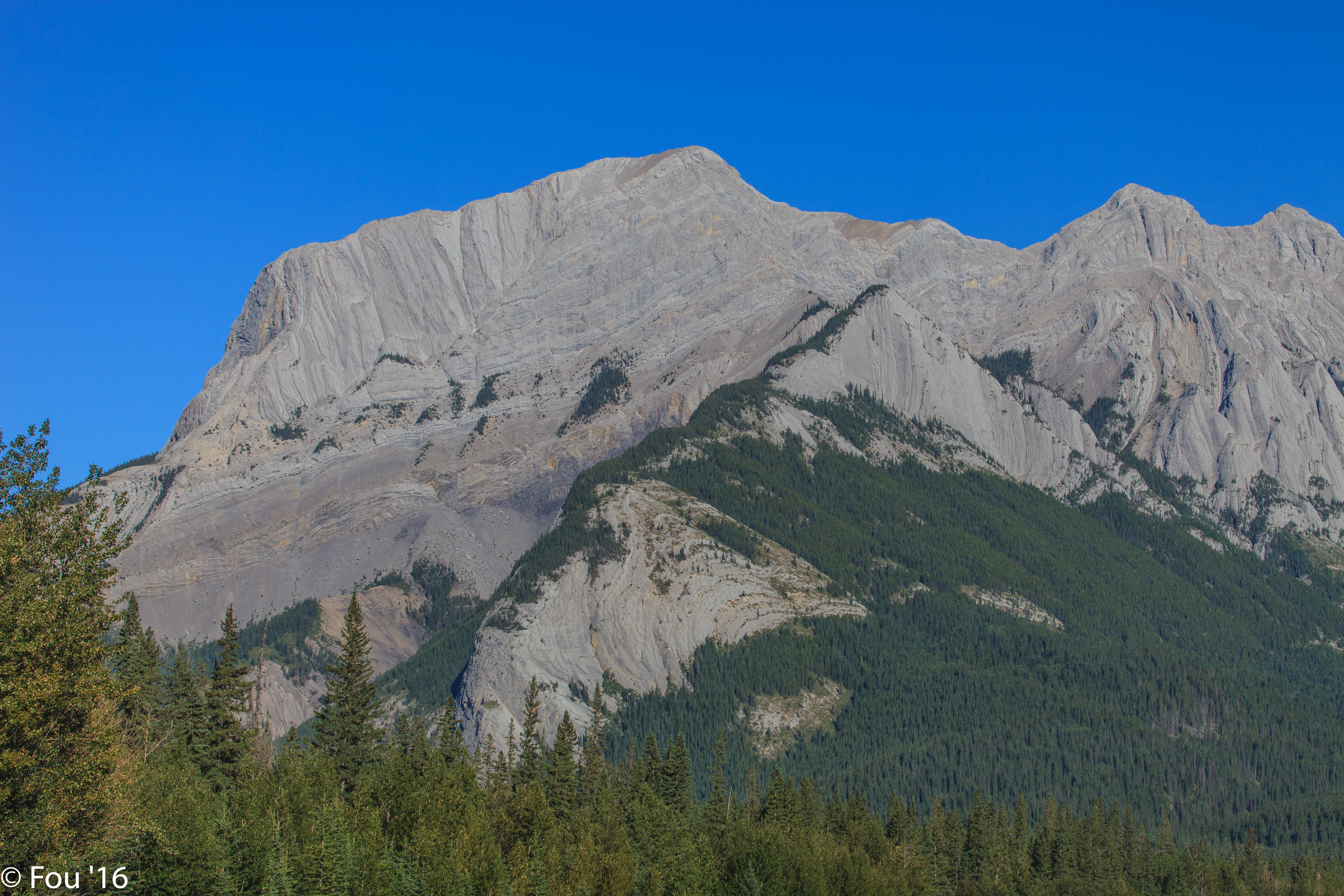
As seen from Highway 16
