= Utopia Mountain =

Mountain in Alberta, Canada

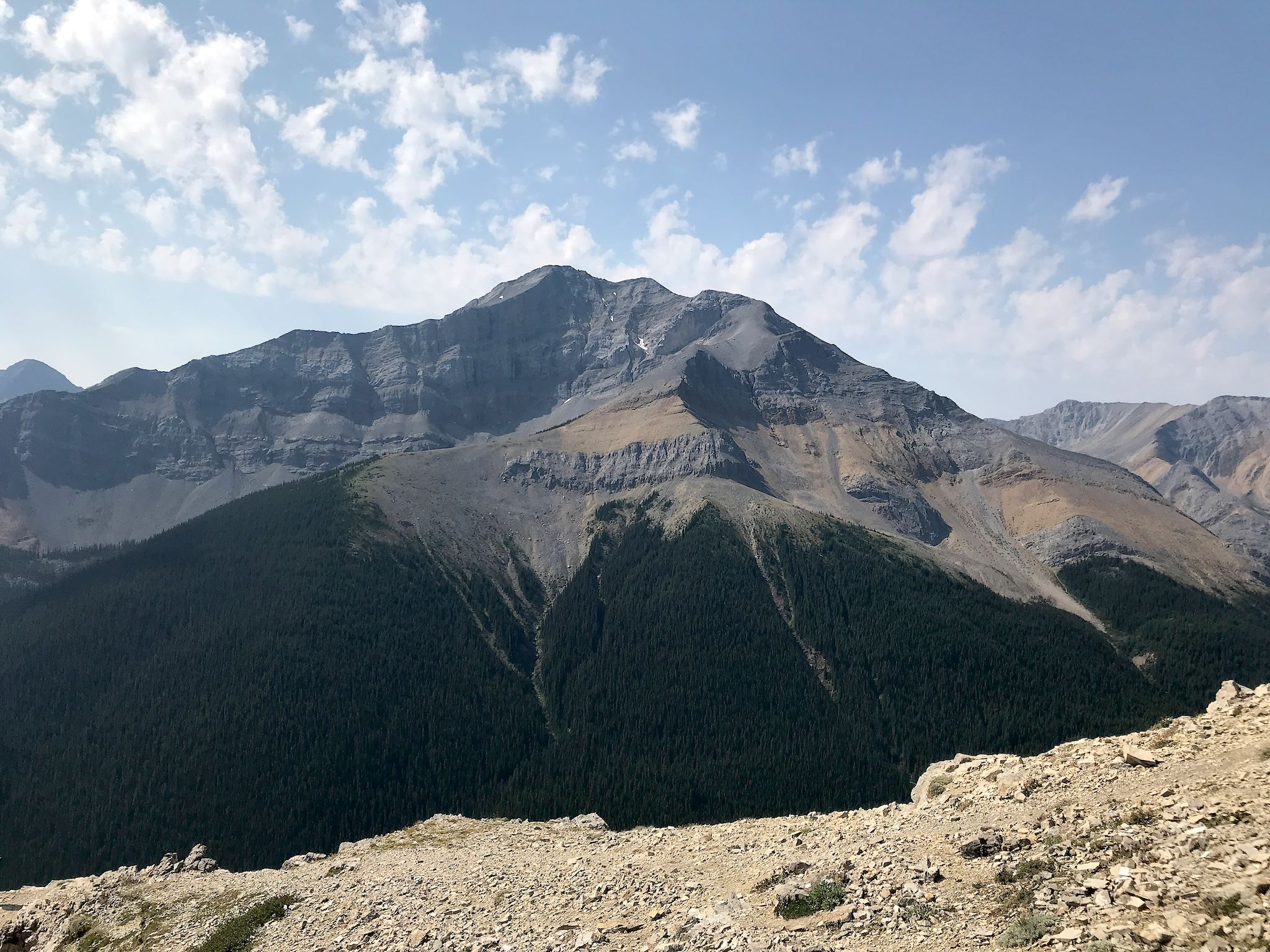
- Utopia Mountain seen from Sulphur Skyline

Highest point
- Elevation: 2,602 m (8,537 ft)
- Prominence: 353 m (1,158 ft)
- Parent peak: Violin Peak (2682 m)
- Listing: Mountains of Alberta
- Coordinates: 53°05′50″N 117°46′08″W

Geography
- Location within Alberta Location within Canada
- Location: Alberta, Canada
- Parent range: Miette Range
- Topo map: NTS 83F4 Miette

Climbing
- Easiest route: Moderate/Difficult Scramble

Utopia Mountain is a 2,602-metre (8,537-foot) mountain in the Miette Range of Jasper National Park, in the Canadian Rockies of Alberta, Canada. It was named by Morrison P. Bridgland in 1916. Bridgland (1878-1948) was a Dominion Land Surveyor who named many peaks in Jasper Park and the Canadian Rockies.

== Climate ==
Based on the Köppen climate classification, Utopia Mountain is in a subarctic climate with cold, snowy winters, and mild summers. Temperatures can drop below −20 °C with wind chill factors below −30 °C. In terms of favorable weather, June through September are the best months to climb. Precipitation runoff from Utopia Mountain drains into tributaries of the Athabasca River.

== See also ==
- Geography of Alberta
