= Cheviot =

Cheviot may refer to:

== Places ==
- The Cheviot, the highest summit in the Cheviot Hills, United Kingdom
- Cheviot, Victoria, Australia
- Cheviot, New Zealand in North Canterbury
- Cheviot (New Zealand electorate), a parliamentary electorate in the Canterbury region of New Zealand
- Cheviot, Ohio, United States

== Other ==
- Cheviot goat, a landrace population of goats in Northern England
- Cheviot sheep, a breed of sheep originally from the borders of England and Scotland
- Cheviot (cloth), a type of tweed, made originally from the wool of the Cheviot sheep
- HMS Cheviot (R90), a C-class destroyer of the British Royal Navy launched in 1944
- SS Cheviot, an English steamer ship of the late 19th century

== See also ==
- Cheviot Hills (disambiguation)
- Cheviot Beach, a beach in Victoria, Australia
- Cheviot Lake, a lake in Saskatchewan, Canada
- Cheviot Mountain, a summit in Alberta, Canada
