= Nikanassin =

Nikanassin is a name of Cree origin, meaning first range and may refer to:

- Nikanassin Range, a mountain range in the Canadian Rockies in Alberta, Canada
- Nikanassin Formation, a geological unit of the Western Canadian Sedimantery Basin of Jurassic age, named after the mountain range
