= Gregg River =

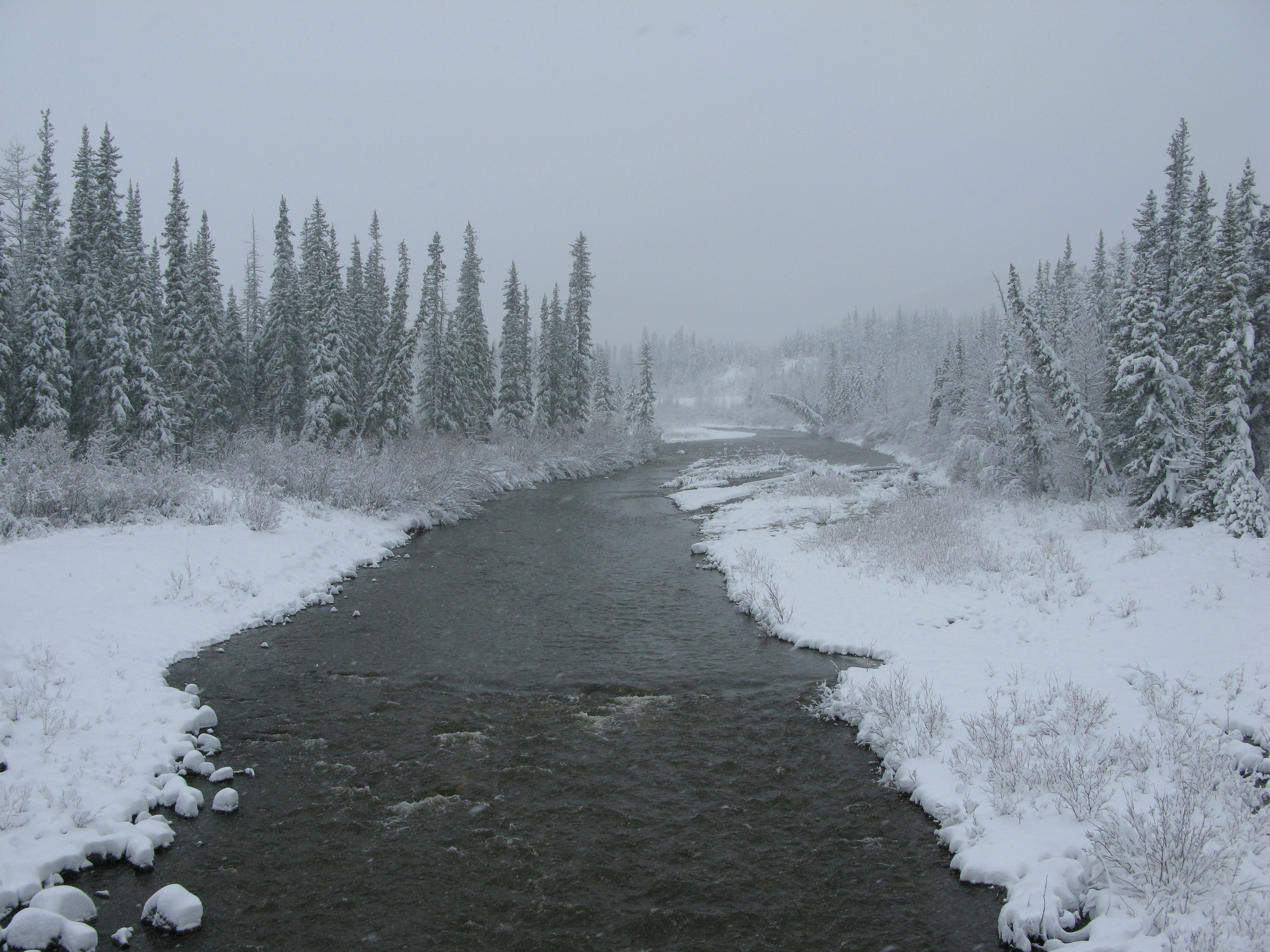
- The Gregg River from Alberta Highway 40

Location
- Country: Canada
- Province: Alberta

Physical characteristics
- Source
  - location: Gregg River Headwaters
  - coordinates: 53°07′20″N 117°28′44″W
  - elevation: 1,489 m (4,885 ft)
- Mouth
  - location: McLeod River
  - coordinates: 53°17′28″N 117°16′52″W
  - elevation: 1,161 m (3,809 ft)

The Gregg River is a short river in west-central Alberta, Canada. The river is named after John James Gregg (1840–1941), a prospector and trapper prominent in the area.

== Course ==
The Gregg River forms at the confluence of a number of minor creeks near the Cardinal River Coal Mine, at the base of Mount Sir Harold Mitchell. The river then flows northwest, taking on a number of tributary creeks before joining the McLeod River, which in turn flows into the Athabasca River. The Gregg is bridged by Alberta Highway 40.

== Tributaries ==
- Berry's Creek
- Sphinx Creek
- Drinnan Creek
- Warden Creek
- Teepee Creek
- Wigwam Creek

== See also ==
- List of Alberta rivers
