= Pocahontas, Alberta =

Human settlement in Alberta, Canada

Coordinates: 53°12′18″N 117°55′34″W

Location of Pocahontas Alberta

Pocahontas is a former coal mining community in Improvement District No. 12 (Jasper National Park) within Alberta's Rockies, Canada. It is on Highway 16, approximately 38 km (24 mi) northeast of Jasper, at the junction that provides access to Miette Hot Springs.

The community was named after Pocahontas, Virginia, United States, also a coal mining town, which itself in turn was named after Pocahontas the person.

On the area of the former community are a campground, a hotel, and a trail through the last remaining structures from the coal-mining era. The campground formerly known as Pocahontas Campground is operated by Parks Canada, reservable online. It has 140 sites, allowing units up to 8.2 m (27 ft). In 2022, the Jasper Indigenous Forum and Parks Canada announced that the campground would be known as Miette Campground in the interim, while discussions continue to "find an acceptable, permanent campground name that properly honours Indigenous cultures and connections to Jasper National Park."

== See also ==
- List of communities in Alberta
