= Cadomin Cave =

Limestone cave in Alberta, Canada

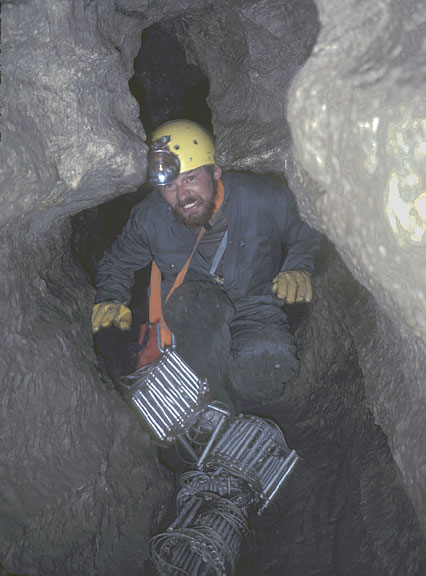
- Cadomin Cave circa 1982, passage between upper and lower series

- Location within Alberta
- Location: Whitehorse Wildland Provincial Park; Alberta, Canada
- Coordinates: 53°01′16″N 117°23′0″W
- Depth: 220 metres (722 ft)
- Length: 2,791 metres (9,157 ft)
- Geology: Limestone
- Hazards: Sumps
- Access: No

Cadomin Cave is a natural limestone cave in the Canadian Rockies near the town of Cadomin, Alberta.

== Geography ==
Cadomin Cave is located within Leyland Mountain at an elevation of 1890m, and was formed within the thickly-bedded limestones of the Palliser Formation. The cave consists of an upper series of spacious phreatic and keyhole-type passages underlain by somewhat smaller passages connected by tight crawlways. There is only one known entrance. Cadomin Cave is named after the town of Cadomin, a portmanteau for the Canada Dominion Mining company.

== Exploration ==
Cadomin Cave has been known since the early 1900s when prospectors opened up the Coal Branch district, but it was almost certainly known to native peoples before then. The first cave survey was conducted in 1959 prior to the formation of Canada's caving clubs, and produced an accurate map of the passages of the upper series as far as the Mess Hall, the cave's principal chamber. In 1977 and 1978 a long-rumored lower series of passages was discovered and surveyed by members of the Alberta Speleological Society, significantly increasing the cave's measured length to 1,704 metres (5,591 ft) and its depth to 171 metres (561 ft). Subsequent explorations including the discovery of the decorated Crystal Crawls in 1982 and unsuccessful dives of the sump have resulted in a measured length of 2,791 metres (9,157 ft) and a depth of 220 metres (722 ft).

== Environmental issues ==
The spacious, easy cave passages of Cadomin Cave's upper series have been popular with local and visiting outdoor enthusiasts for over a hundred years, and are amongst the most vandalized in the Canadian Rockies. In 1997 the Alberta Speleological Society became official stewards of Cadomin Cave under a program managed by Alberta Environment, and periodically conduct garbage cleanups and graffiti removal and assist with bat counts. In 1999 the cave was included within the newly formed Whitehorse Wildland Provincial Park. Cadomin Cave is a hibernaculum for three bat species, including little brown bats, the most common species found in the cave, and access is prohibited under a provincial ministerial order effective on May 14, 2010 to reduce the risk of white nose syndrome transmission. Before 2010, access was prohibited between the first weekend in September and the first day of May to protect the bat colony's hibernation season. Annual surveys are done by researchers to monitor the bat population in the cave and check for the presence of white nose syndrome on bats. The 2025 survey found about 1600 bats, consistent with the population records from past 10 years since cave access was closed. A locked gate was installed to prevent human access while facilitating bat movements.
