= McLeod River =

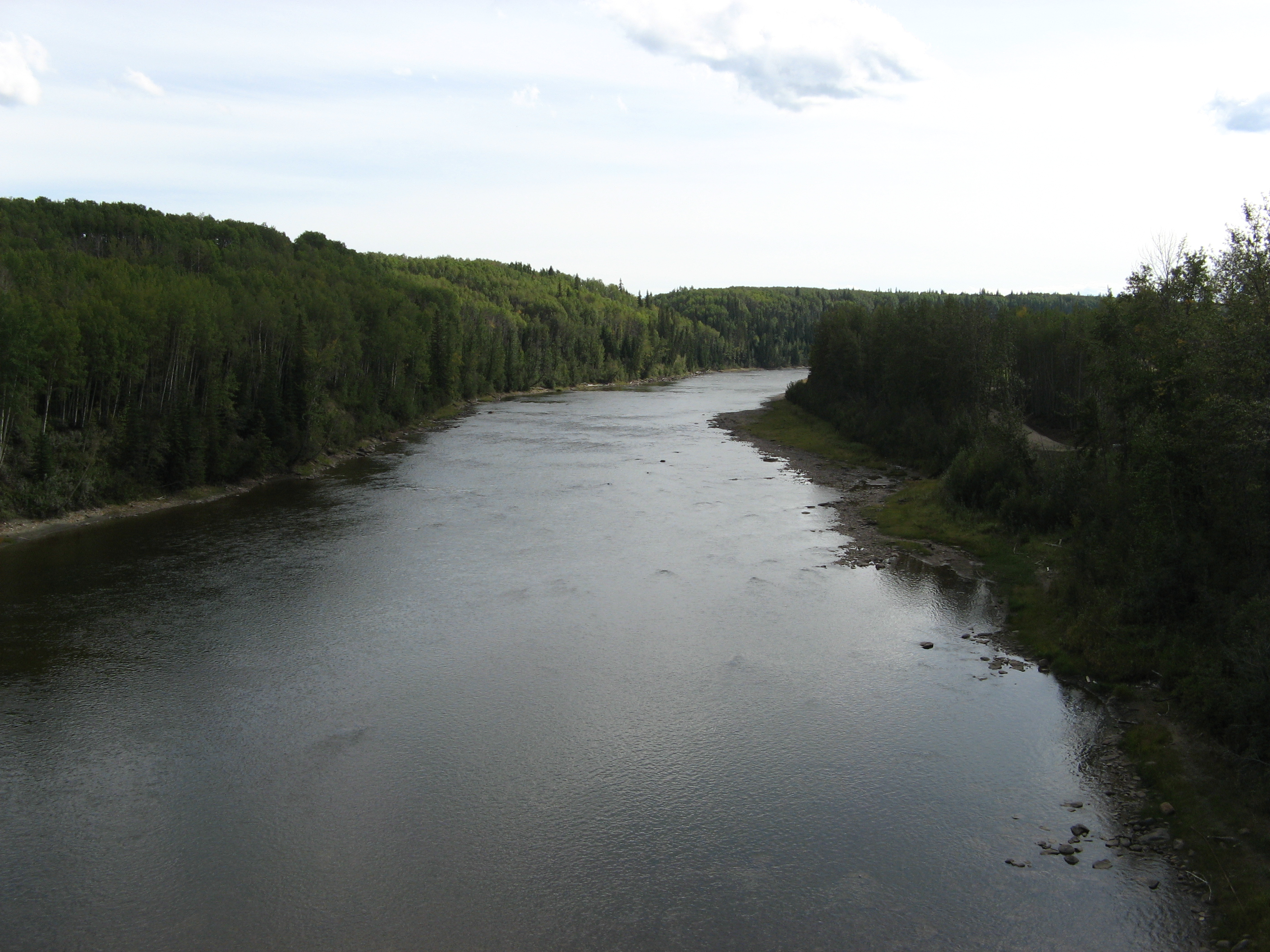
- The McLeod River near Edson, Alberta

Location
- Country: Canada
- Province: Alberta

Physical characteristics
- Source
  - location: Cardinal Divide
  - coordinates: 52°59′00″N 117°20′15″W
  - elevation: 1,621 m (5,318 ft)
- Mouth
  - location: Athabasca River
  - coordinates: 52°51′55″N 115°42′01″W
  - elevation: 690 m (2,260 ft)

The McLeod River is a river in west-central Alberta, Canada. It forms in the foothills of the Canadian Rockies, and is a major tributary of the Athabasca River.

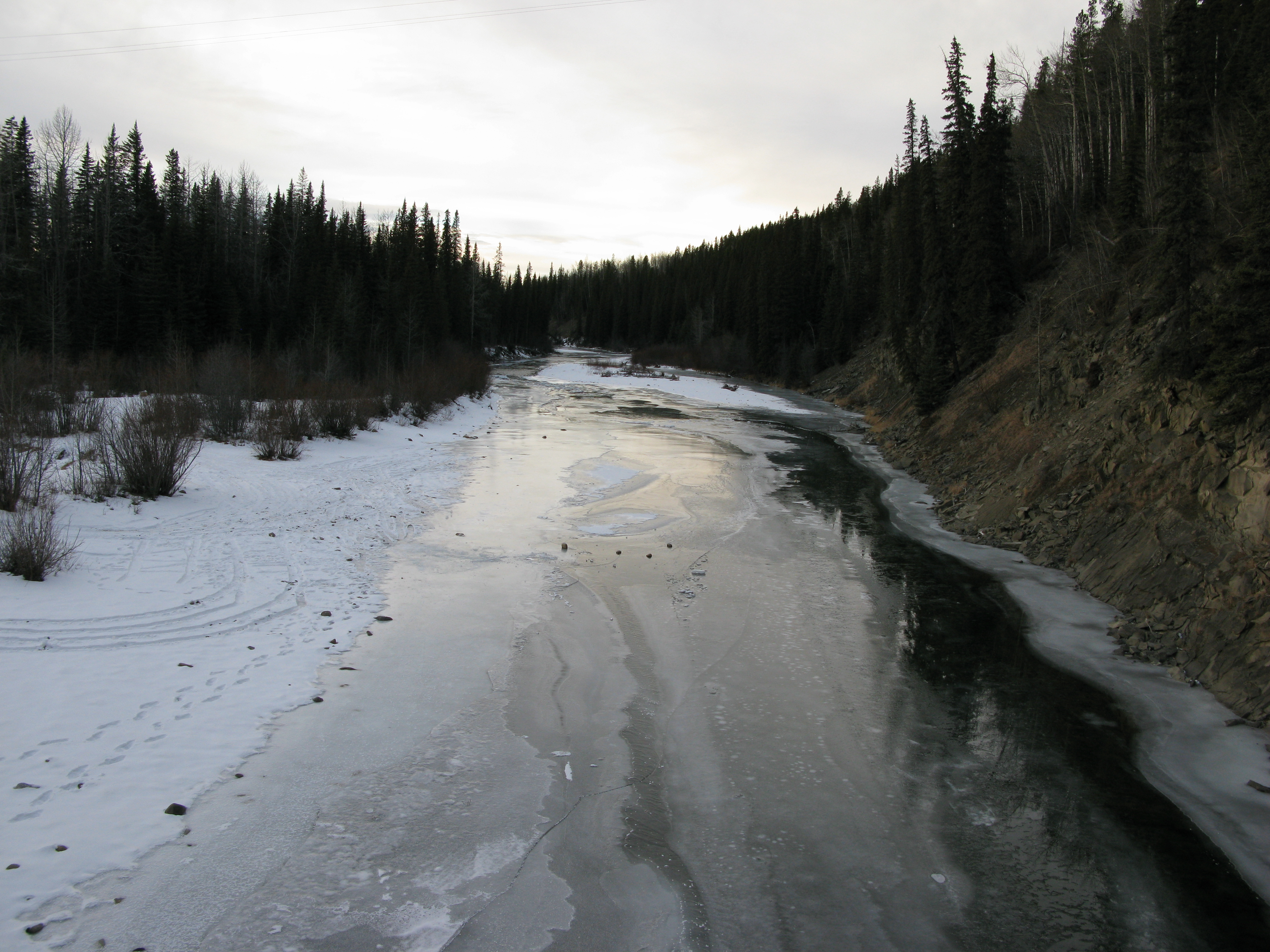
The McLeod River south of Hinton, Alberta

== Course ==
The river begins in the southern arm of Whitehorse Wildland Provincial Park, about 5 kilometres east of the eastern boundary of Jasper National Park. The McLeod River originates from a northward basin between Tripoli Ridge and the Cardinal Divide, a watershed divide that separates water that eventually drains north into the Arctic Ocean and east into Hudson Bay. Headwater tributaries of the McLeod River flowing from the eastern slope of the Rockies include Thornton, Prospect, Whitehorse, Cadomin, and Luscar Creeks. The river snakes through the foothills and is soon joined by four major tributaries, the Gregg, Erith, Embarrass, and Edson rivers before meeting the Athabasca River near the town of Whitecourt, Alberta.

== Planned dam ==
Throughout the 1950s and the 1960s the Alberta Government undertook a number of planning studies that discussed diverting water from the Athabasca-Mackenzie watershed to the North and South Saskatchewan Rivers. In 1970, a preliminary engineering report on the McLeod Valley Dam was released by the provincial Department of Agriculture.

The dam was to be 32 kilometres (20 mi) northeast of Edson, Alberta, near the hamlet of Peers, Alberta. The diverted water would have been sent via a canal to Chip Lake. The report read:

The main embankment would be 5,810 feet [1,770 m] long with crest elevation at 2,780 feet [850 m] and a maximum height of 140 feet [43 m]. Dykes, 13,230 feet [4,030 m] long and with a maximum height of 15 feet [4.6 m] would also be required. Two diversion tunnels, one of which will later be converted to a low level outlet, are proposed to handle river flow during the construction period. A gated ogee crest spillway has been designed with a discharge capacity sufficient to route a 1:500 year flood through the reservoir. The dam would create a reservoir approximately 12 miles [19 km] long with a total storage area of 562,700 acre-feet [694,100,000 m^{3}] at full supply level of 2,770 feet [840 m].

The McLeod Valley Dam, as well as the larger Athabasca-to-Saskatchewan diversion scheme, was shelved in the 1970s due to rising construction costs and environmental concerns.

== Tributaries ==
Tributaries of the McLeod River, from headwaters to the Athabasca River, include:

- Thornton Creek
- Cheviot Creek
- Prospect Creek
- Whitehorse Creek
  - Drummond Creek, Harlequin Creek
- Cadomin Creek
- Luscar Creek
  - Lac des Roches
- Watson Creek
- Mackenzie Creek
- Beaverdam Creek
  - Taylor Creek, Chief Creek, Thompson Creek, Rainbow Creek
- Mercoal Creek
- Deerlick Creek
  - Eunice Creek
- Wampus Creek
- Mary Gregg Creek
  - Mary Gregg Lake, Trapper Creek
- Antler Creek
- McCardell Creek
- Gregg River
  - Berry's Creek, Sphinx Creek, Drinnan Creek, Folding Mountain Creek, Mystery Lake, Warden Creek, Teepee Creek, Wigwam Creek
- Anderson Creek
- Quigley Creek
- McPherson Creek
- White Creek
- Corral Creek
- Embarras River
  - Mitchell Creek, Baril Creek, Lambert Creek, Neill Creek, Prest Creek, Bryan Creek, Dummy (Hay) Creek
  - Erith River
    - Rodney Creek, Raven Creek, Hanlan Creek, Lendrum Creek, Lund Creek, Halpenny Creek, Wickham Creek
- Little Sundance Creek
- Swartz Creek
- Wolf Creek
- Edson River
  - Bench Creek
- Trout Creek
- January Creek
- South Carrot Creek
- Lost Creek
- Groat Creek
- Beaver Creek

== See also ==
- List of Alberta rivers
