= Cheviot Hills (disambiguation) =

The Cheviot Hills are a range of hills in Scotland and England.

Cheviot Hills may also refer to:

- Cheviot Hills, Los Angeles, a neighborhood of Los Angeles, California, U.S.
- Cheviot, New Zealand, a town in Canterbury named for the Cheviot Hills Estate
- Cheviot Hills, Alberta, Canada, a locality in Lac Ste. Anne County
- Cheviot Hills Military Academy in Culver City, California, U.S.

== See also ==
- Cheviot (disambiguation)
