= Miette Range =

Mountain range in Alberta, Canada

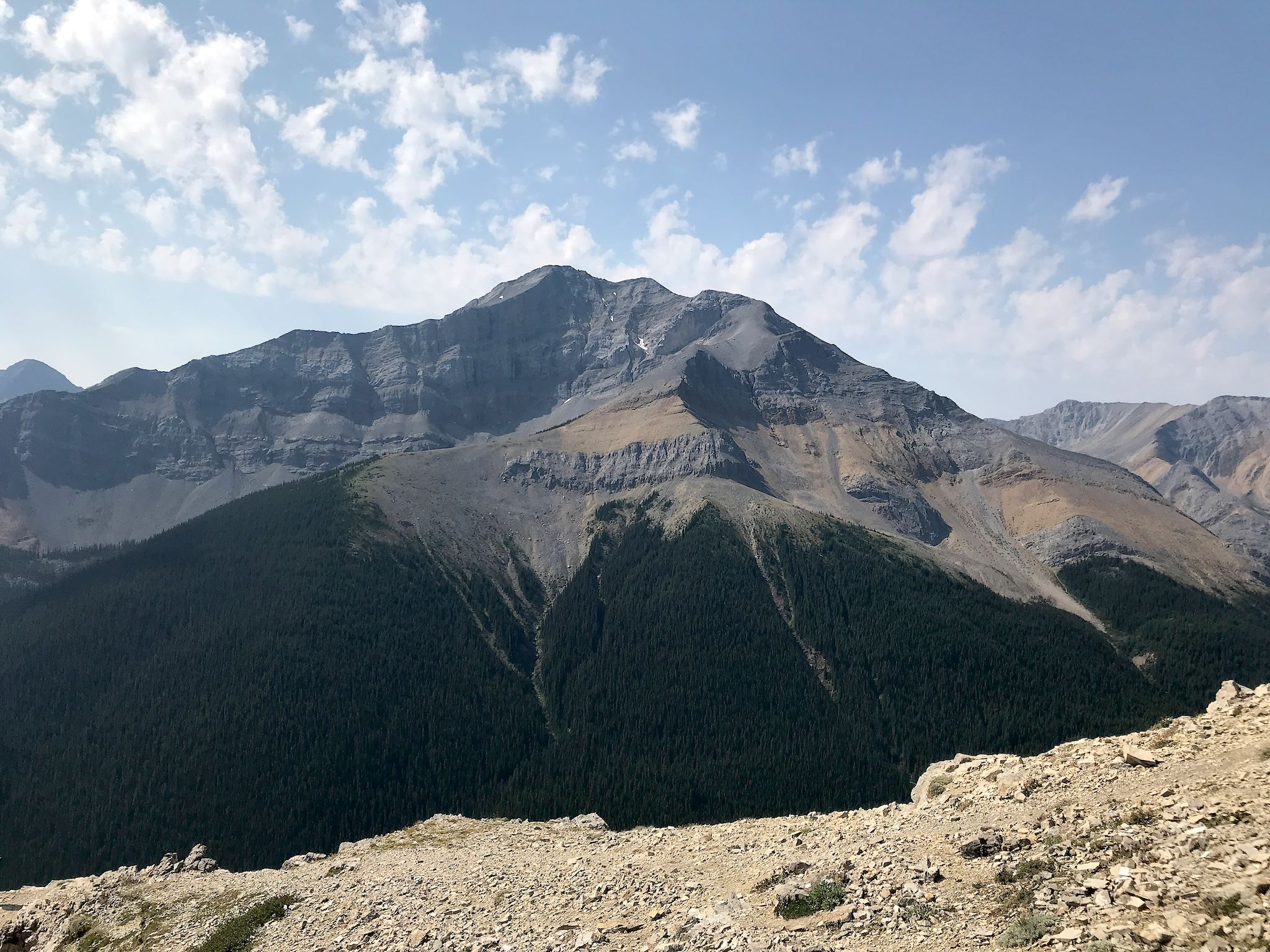
- Utopia Mountain from the Sulphur Skyline

Highest point
- Peak: Utopia Mountain
- Elevation: 2,602 m (8,537 ft)
- Listing: Mountains of Alberta
- Coordinates: 53°05′50″N 117°46′08″W

Geography
- Location within Alberta
- Country: Canada
- Province: Alberta
- Range coordinates: 53°08′N 117°51′W
- Parent range: Canadian Rockies
- Topo map: NTS 83F4 Miette

The Miette Range is a mountain range of the Canadian Rockies located south of Highway 16 near the east border of Jasper National Park, Alberta, Canada.

This range includes the following mountains and peaks:

Mountain/peak	Elevation		Location
Mountain/peak	metres	feet	Location
Utopia Mountain	2,602	8,537	53°05′46″N 117°46′01″W
Mount O'Hagan	2,445	8,022	53°06′46″N 117°48′41″W
Capitol Mountain	2,438	7,999	53°07′54″N 117°51′45″W
Roche Miette	2,316	7,598	53°09′46″N 117°55′08″W
Syncline Ridge	1,905	6,250	53°09′40″N 117°56′10″W

== See also ==
- Ranges of the Canadian Rockies
