= Edson River =

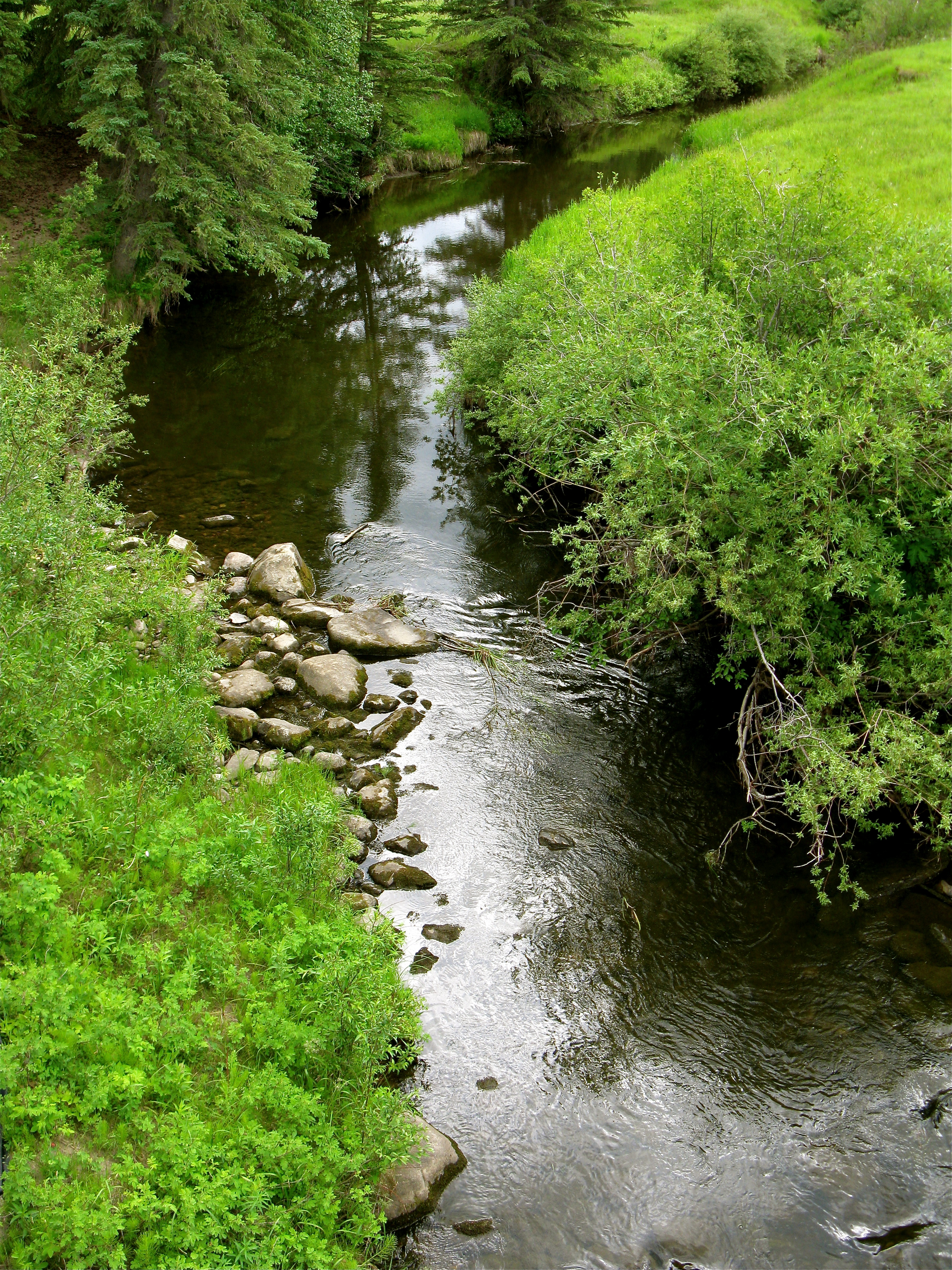
- The Edson River near Edson, Alberta

Location
- Country: Canada
- Location: Alberta

Physical characteristics
- Source
  - location: Edson River Headwaters
  - coordinates: 53°43′19″N 116°52′01″W
  - elevation: 1,103 m (3,619 ft)
- Mouth
  - location: McLeod River
  - coordinates: 53°39′04″N 116°17′17″W
  - elevation: 846 m (2,776 ft)
- Basin size: Athabasca River

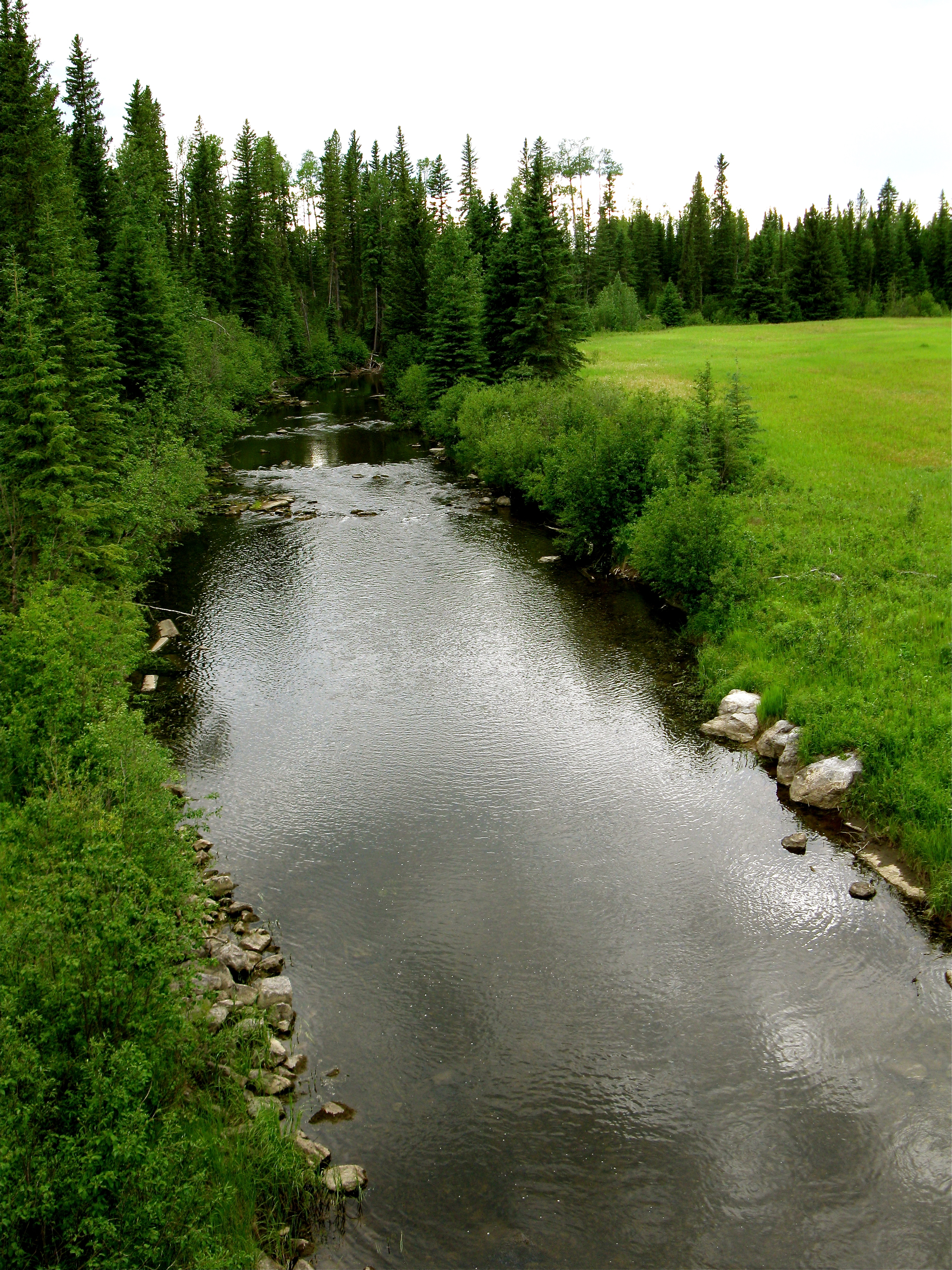
The Edson River from Alberta Highway 748

The Edson River is a minor river in west-central Alberta, Canada. The river, like the nearby town of Edson, is named for Edson Joseph Chamberlin (1852–1924), a vice-president and General Manager of the Grand Trunk Pacific Railway. Chamberlain also acted as the President of the Grand Trunk Railway.

== Course ==
The Edson flows east south-east from its origin in the hills north of Highway 16. It takes on a number of small creeks, and is bridged by the Emerson Lake Haul Road, a multi-use road originally developed by the oil and gas industry. The Edson is bridged twice by Alberta Highway 748 before flowing in to the Mcleod River near Wolf Creek, Alberta.

== Fish ==
Fish found in the Edson River, near its confluence with the Mcleod River, include rainbow trout, Arctic grayling, mountain whitefish, and brown trout.

== Tributaries ==
- Bench Creek

== See also ==
- List of Alberta rivers
