= Embarras River (Alberta) =

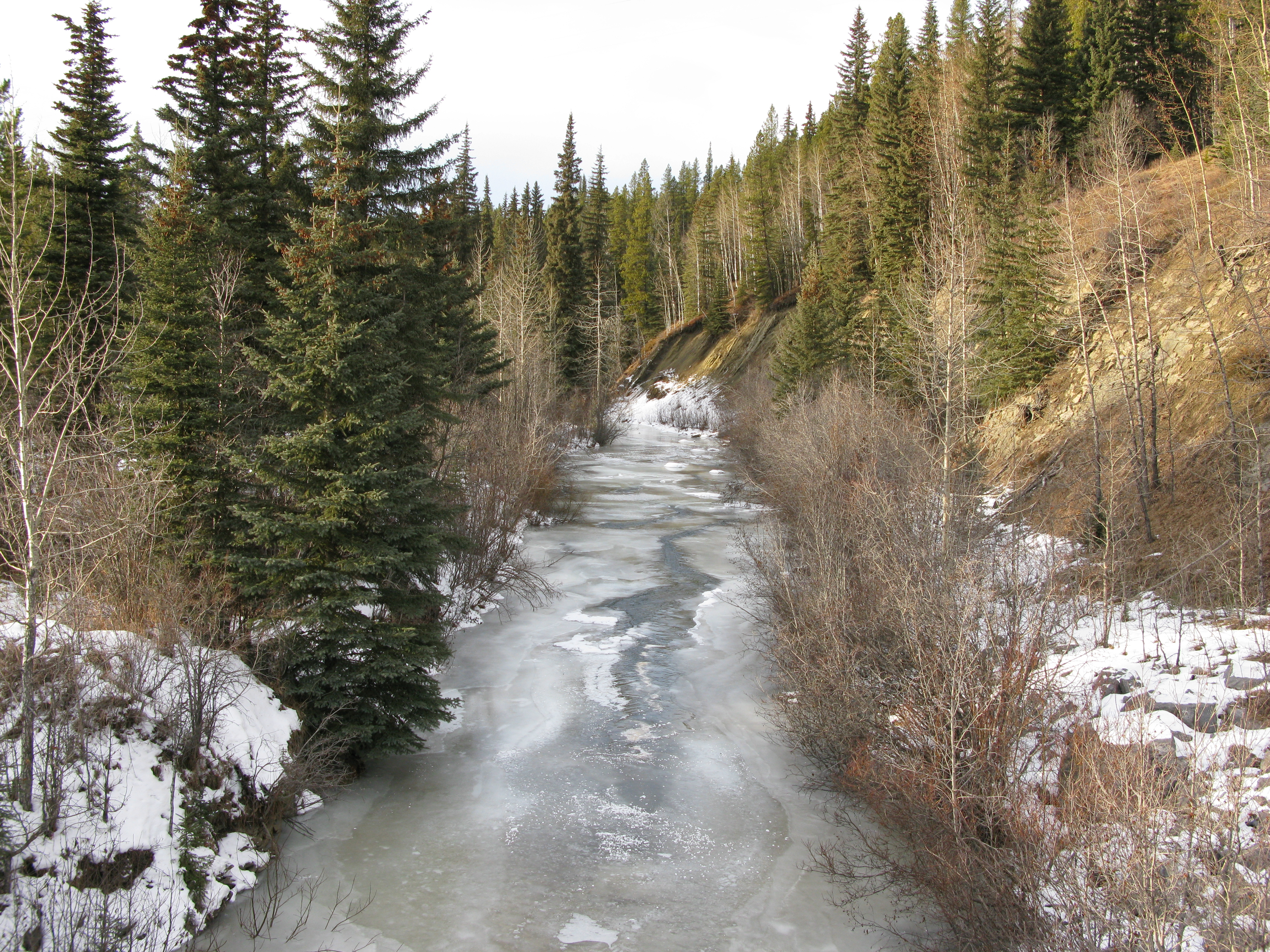
- The Embarras River south of Hinton, Alberta

Location
- Country: Canada
- Province: Alberta

Physical characteristics
- Source
  - location: Embarras River Headwaters
  - coordinates: 53°10′39″N 117°00′27″W
  - elevation: 1,189 m (3,901 ft)
- Mouth
  - location: McLeod River
  - coordinates: 53°27′37″N 116°37′06″W
  - elevation: 927 m (3,041 ft)

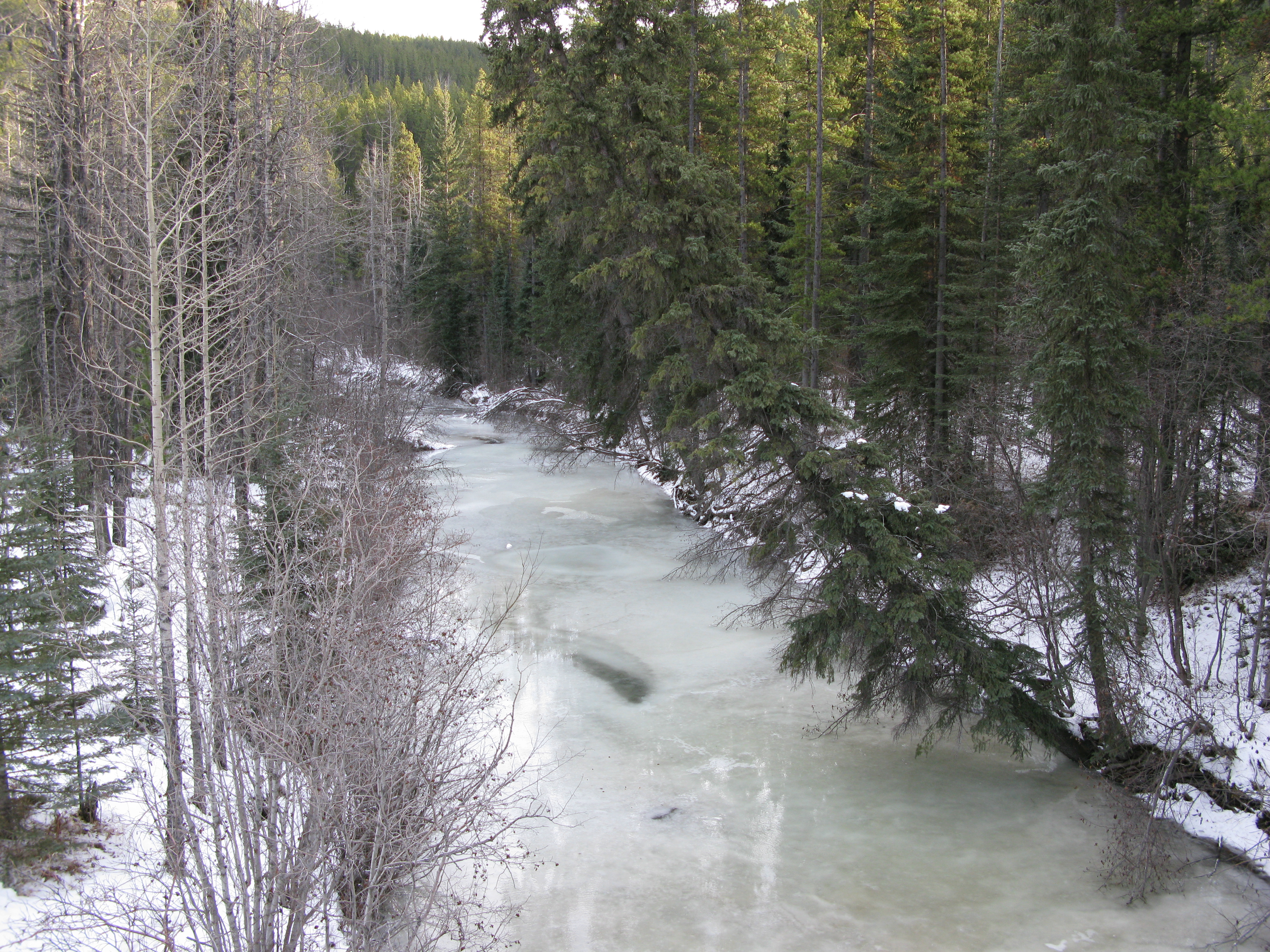
The Embarras River from Alberta Highway 47

The Embarras River is a short river in west-central Alberta, Canada. The river likely derived its name from the French word for obstruction, because it is often obstructed by driftwood.

== Course ==
The Embarras flows north-northeast through the foothills of the Canadian Rockies east of Jasper National Park before being joined by the Erith River. It then flows into the McLeod River, which in turn flows into the Athabasca River.

It forms near Robb, Alberta at the junction of a few small creeks. Snaking northward, the Embarras parallels Alberta Highway 47 before its confluence with the McLeod. In the winter, it freezes solid. In the summer, the flow rate can reach 35 mph.

Embarras Landing is a former coal town established at the confluence of the river with Prest Creek.

== Tributaries ==
- Dummy (Hay) Creek
- Prest Creek
- Neill Creek
- Mitchell Creek
- Baril Creek
  - Lambert Creek

== See also ==
- List of Alberta rivers
