= Fiddle Peak =

Mountain in Jasper NP, Alberta, Canada

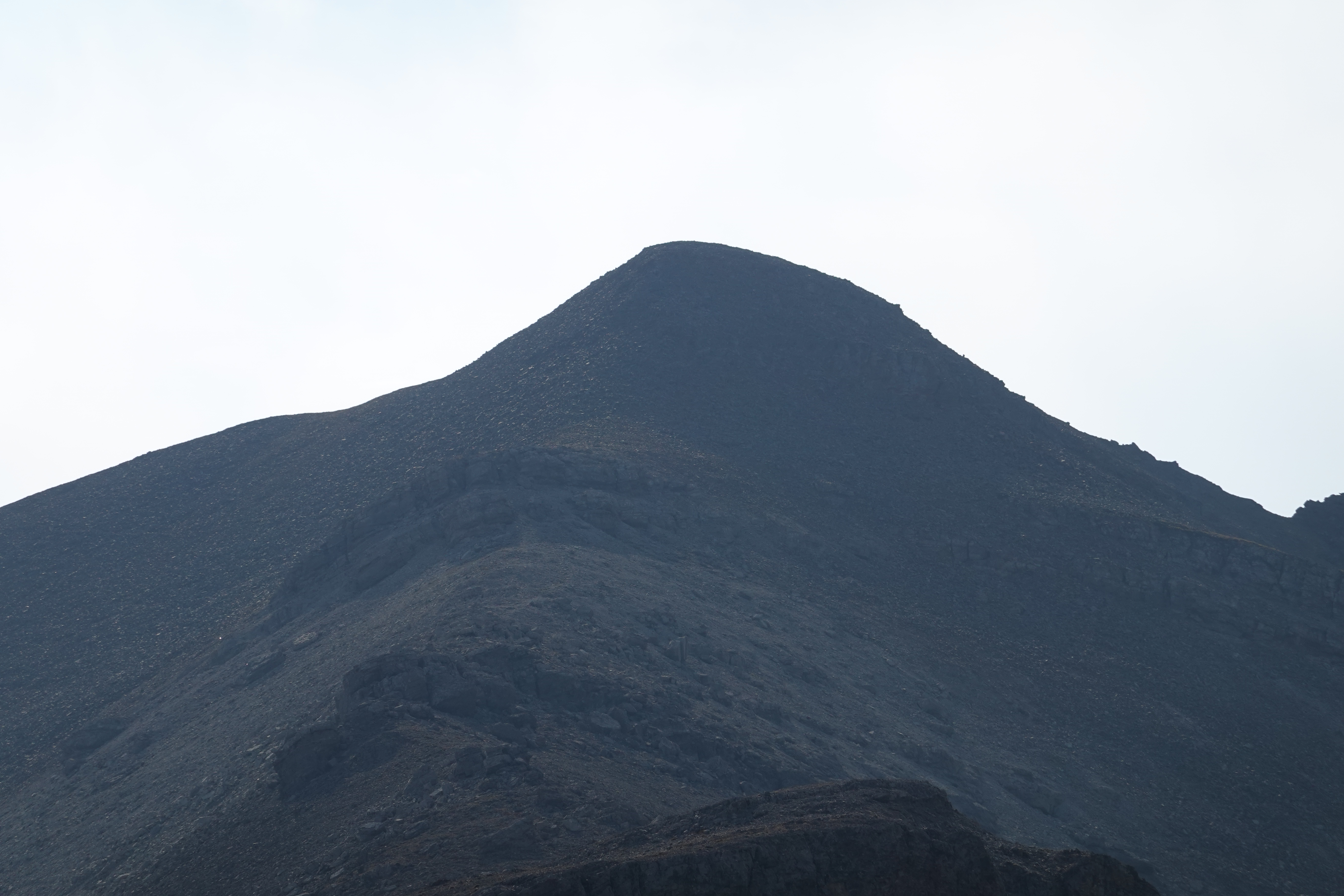
- Fiddle Peak seen from northwest

Highest point
- Elevation: 2,243 m (7,359 ft)
- Prominence: 765 m (2,510 ft)
- Parent peak: Sphinx Mountain (2460 m)
- Listing: Mountains of Alberta
- Coordinates: 53°10′46″N 117°44′42″W

Geography
- Location within Alberta
- Country: Canada
- Province: Alberta
- Protected area: Jasper National Park
- Parent range: Fiddle Range
- Topo map: NTS 82F4 Trail

Fiddle Peak was named by James Hector in 1858. It is located in the Fiddle Range of Jasper National Park, Alberta, Canada.
