= Fiddle Range =

Mountain range of the Canadian Rockies

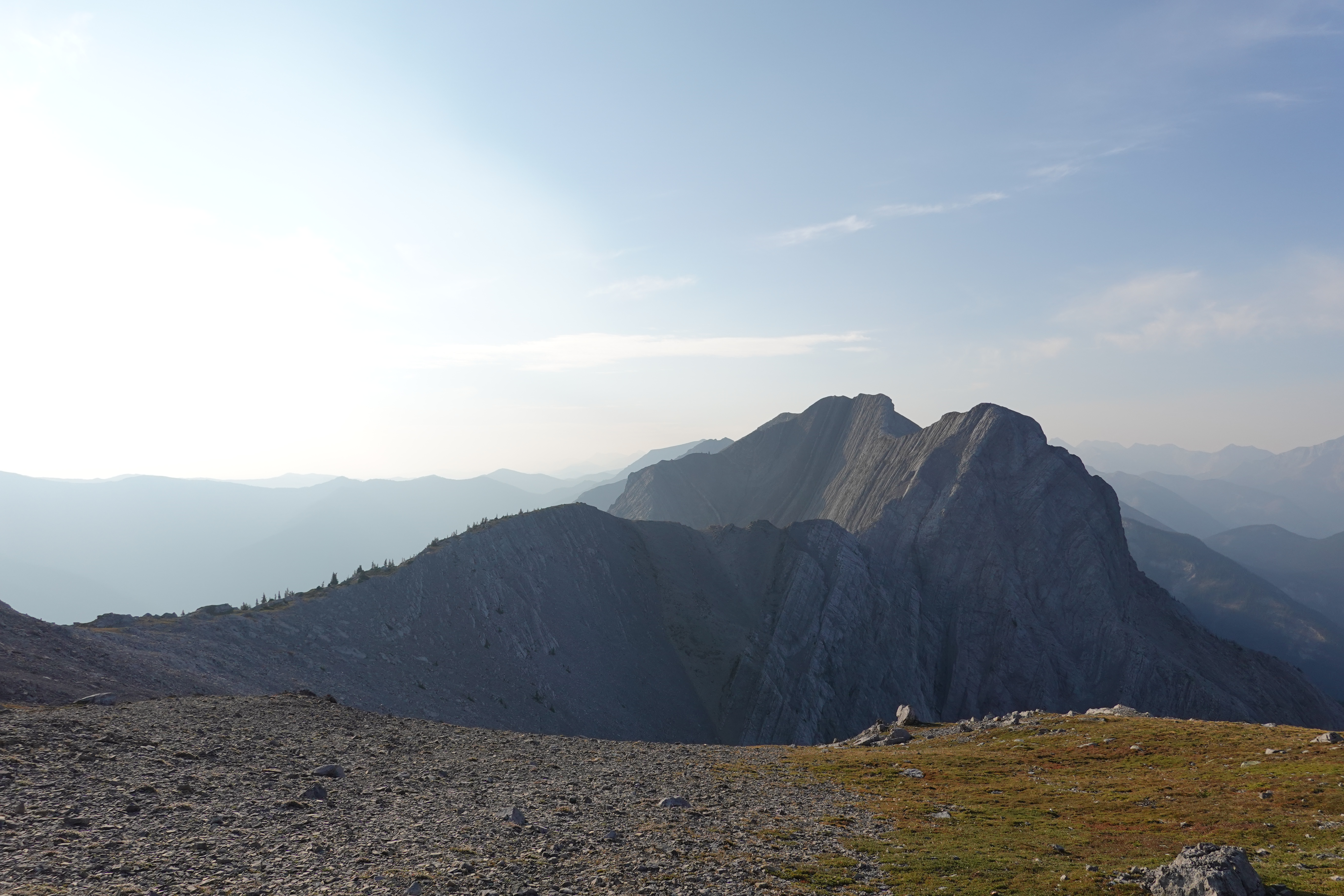
- Fiddle Range seen from Roche à Perdrix summit

Highest point
- Peak: Fiddle Peak
- Elevation: 2,243 m (7,359 ft)
- Listing: Mountains of Alberta
- Coordinates: 53°10′46″N 117°44′42″W

Geography
- Location within Alberta
- Country: Canada
- Province: Alberta
- Range coordinates: 53°11′57″N 117°46′48″W
- Parent range: Canadian Rockies
- Topo map: NTS 83F4 Miette

The Fiddle Range is a mountain range of the Canadian Rockies located south of Highway 16 on the east border of Jasper National Park, Canada.

The range was so named on account of noises produced by blowing wind.

This range includes the following mountains and peaks:

Name	Elevation (m/ft)	
Fiddle Peak	2,243	7,359
Roche à Perdrix	2,135	7,005

== See also ==
- Ranges of the Canadian Rockies
