= Mount Cardinal =

Mountain in the country of Canada

Coordinates: 52.845°N 117.318°W

Mount Cardinal is a summit in Alberta, Canada.

Mount Cardinal was named after Jacques Cardinal, a businessperson in the fur industry.
