= Miette Hot Springs =

Thermal springs in Canada

Coordinates: 53°7′47.507″N 117°46′13.876″W

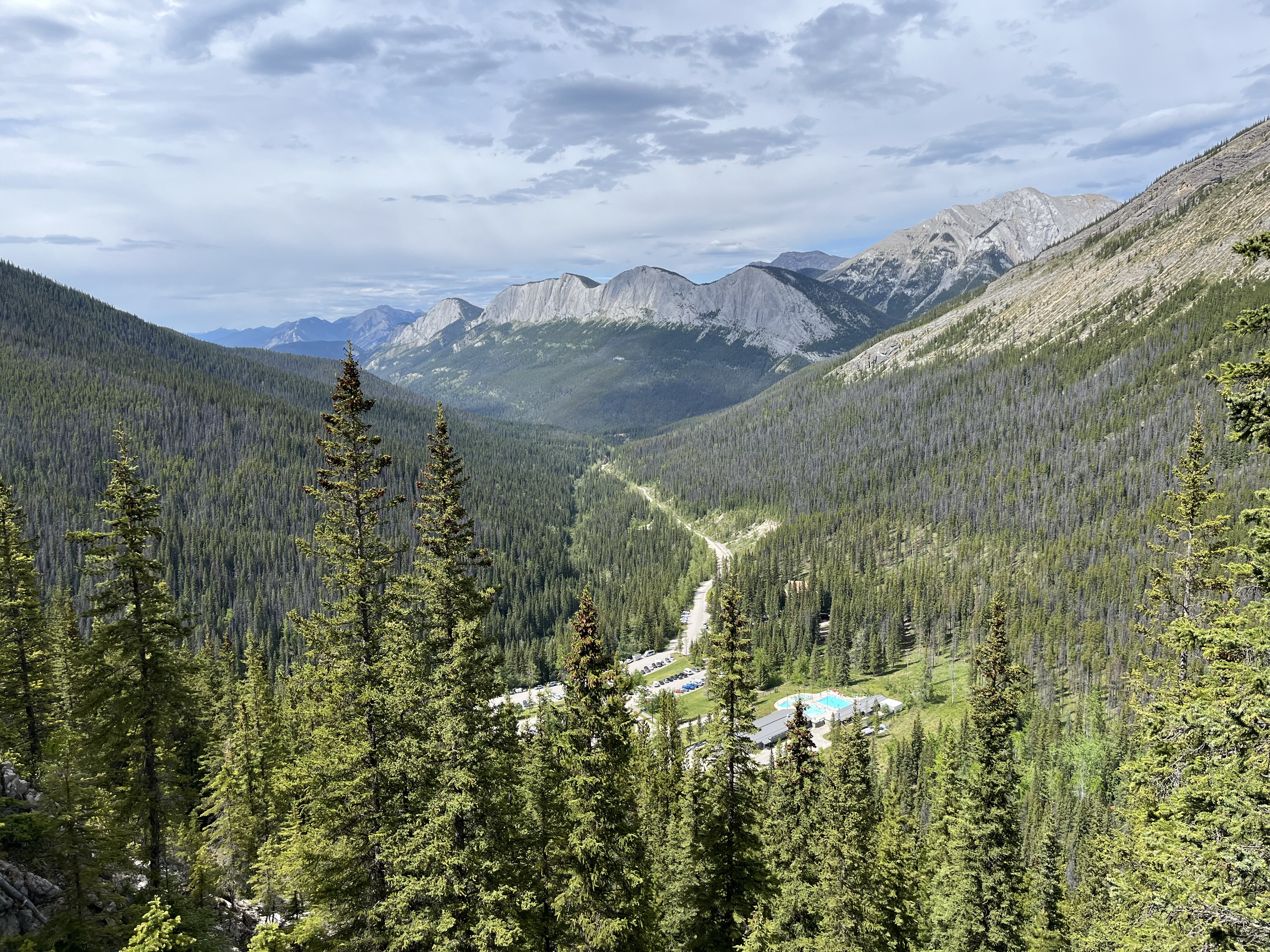
Miette Hot Springs below. Ashlar's Ridge in the background.

Miette Hot Springs are commercially developed hot springs in Jasper National Park in Alberta, Canada, between the towns of Hinton and Jasper. The pool is outdoors and offers visitors a view of the surrounding Fiddle River Valley.

== Modern facilities ==
The complex is at the end of the 17-kilometre (11 mi) seasonal Miette Road off of Highway 16, near the east gate of the park. It has two hot pools, kept at approximately 40 °C (104 °F), and two cold plunge pools of different temperatures.

== History ==
In the 19th century, Indigenous people showed fur traders the Sulphur Creek springs.

In the 1910s, the Grand Trunk Pacific Railway planned to develop the springs as a major tourist attraction in the style of the Banff Springs Hotel, engaging architect Francis Rattenbury for the design. This was frustrated by the outbreak of World War I, the railway's insolvency, and the death of General Manager Charles Melville Hays during the sinking of the Titanic. By 1919, there was only a rough trail and modest structures used by workers from the Pocahontas coal mining camp down the valley.

In 1934, the government of Canada began construction of an automobile road and pool as part of a federal Great Depression relief program. It was completed in 1938. A 1962 pamphlet from the National Parks Branch described the facilities as being, "equipped with a large pool, plunges, steam-rooms, and dressing accommodation."

== Thermal spring properties ==
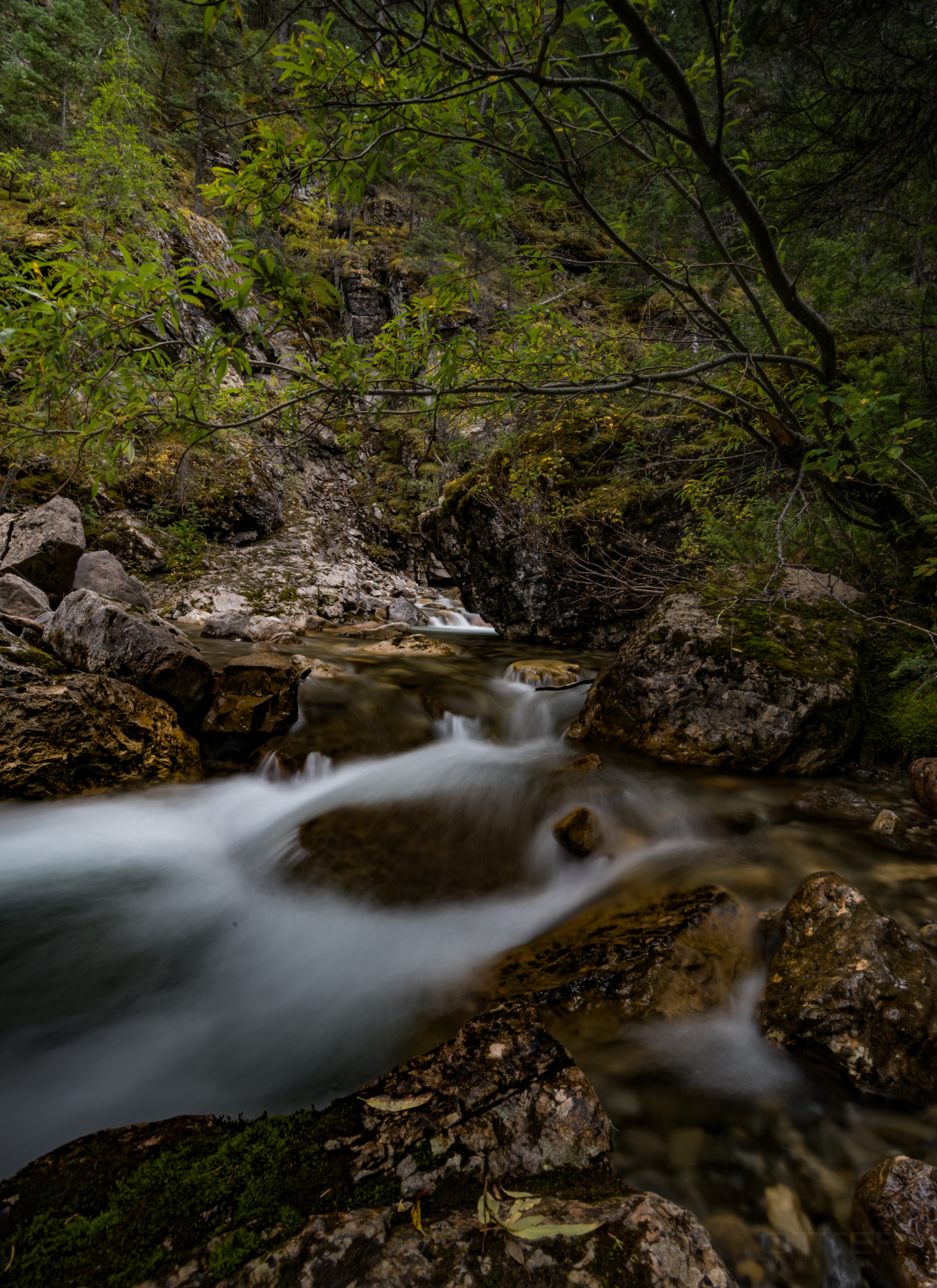
Source of the spring, Miette Hot Springs

There are three springs and several minor seeps above the ruins of the 1938 pool. David M. Baird in 1963 reported that the hottest was about 52 °C (126 °F). Though the temperatures fluctuate seasonally by as much as 20 °C (68 °F) (snow melt during spring mixes with the spring water underground and cools it), the average temperature at the surface is 51.2 °C (124.2 °F). The spring waters are rich in sulphate, carbonate, strontium, and calcium.
