= Mount Bryant =

Mountain in Alberta, Canada

- Location within Alberta

Highest point
- Elevation: 2,629 m (8,625 ft)
- Prominence: 203 m (666 ft)
- Coordinates: 50°54′5″N 114°59′29″W

Geography
- Location: Alberta
- Parent range: Fairholme Range
- Topo map: NTS 82J15 Bragg Creek

Climbing
- Easiest route: Scramble up the north eastern slopes

Mount Bryant is a mountain in the Fisher Range in the Rocky Mountains of Alberta. Named for Alfred Harold Bryant, a homesteader from the surrounding area who later became a forest ranger.

== See also ==
- Mountains of Alberta
