= Cheviot Mountain =

Mountain in Alberta, Canada

Coordinates: 52.911°N 117.353°W

Cheviot Mountain is a summit in Alberta, Canada.

Cheviot Mountain takes its name from Cheviot Hills, at the Anglo-Scottish border.
