= Blackface Mountain =

Mountain in Alberta, Canada

Coordinates: 52.9000°N 117.4101°W

Blackface Mountain is a summit in Alberta, Canada.

Blackface Mountain most likely was so named on account of its appearance.
