= Improvement District No. 12 =

Improvement district in Alberta, Canada

Improvement District No. 12 (Jasper National Park)
- Improvement district
- Location within Alberta
- Coordinates: 52°45′15″N 117°53′30″W
- Country: Canada
- Province: Alberta
- Region: Alberta's Rockies
- Census division: No. 15
- Established: April 1, 1945
- Renumbered: January 1, 1969

Government
  - Governing body: Alberta Municipal Affairs (AMA)
  - Minister of AMA: Ric McIver
  - CAO: Darryl Joyce
  - MLA: Martin Long

Area (2021)
  - Land: 10,118.55 km^{2} (3,906.79 sq mi)

Population (2021)
  - Total: 0
  - Density: 0/km^{2} (0/sq mi)
- Time zone: UTC−06:00 (Alberta Time)

Improvement District No. 12 (Jasper National Park), or Improvement District No. 12, is an improvement district in Alberta, Canada. Coextensive with Jasper National Park in Alberta's Rockies, the improvement district is the municipality that provides local government for the portion of the park outside the Municipality of Jasper.

== History ==
Improvement District (I.D.) No. 12 was originally formed as I.D. No. 80 on April 1, 1945, through the amalgamation of I.D. Nos. 379, 438, 439, 469, 499, 500, and 530, as well as portions of I.D. Nos. 348, 378, 436, 437, 466, 468, 498, 528, 529, and 558. I.D. No. 80 was renumbered to I.D. No. 12 on January 1, 1969.

A second improvement district, Jasper Improvement District, was separated from I.D. No. 12 on August 31, 1995. Jasper Improvement District subsequently became a specialized municipality named the Municipality of Jasper on July 20, 2001.

== Geography ==
=== Communities and localities ===
There are no communities located within Improvement District No. 12.

The following localities are located within Improvement District No. 12.

Localities

- Athabasca Falls
- Devona
- East Gate Trailers
- Lake Edith
- Miette
- Miette Hot Springs
- Pocahontas
- Shale Banks
- Snaring
- Sunwapta

== Demographics ==
In the 2021 Census of Population conducted by Statistics Canada, Improvement District No. 12 had a population of 0 living in 0 of its 0 total private dwellings, a change of −100% from its 2016 population of 53. With a land area of 10,118.55 km^{2} (3,906.79 sq mi), it had a population density of 0.0/km^{2} (0.0/sq mi) in 2021.

In the 2016 Census of Population conducted by Statistics Canada, Improvement District No. 12 had a population of 53 living in 0 of its 0 total private dwellings, a change of 55.9% from its 2011 population of 34. With a land area of 10,185.75 km^{2} (3,932.74 sq mi), it had a population density of 0.01/km^{2} (0.01/sq mi) in 2016.

== Government ==
Improvement District No. 12 is administered by Alberta Municipal Affairs.

== See also ==
- List of communities in Alberta
