= Alberta Highway 734 =

Highway in Alberta, Canada

Forestry Trunk Road
- Highway 734
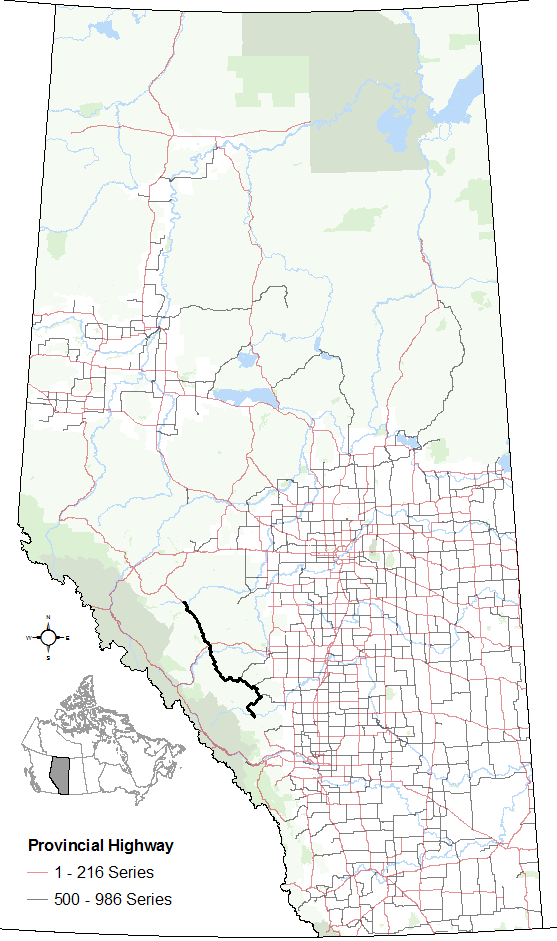

Route information
- Maintained by the Ministry of Transportation and Economic Corridors

Forestry Trunk Road (southern segment)
- Length: 99 km (62 mi)
- South end: Highway 40 north of Coleman
- Major intersections: Highway 532
- North end: Highway 40 / Highway 541 west of Longview

Forestry Trunk Road (central segment)
- Length: 27 km (17 mi)
- South end: Highway 40 / Highway 579 west of Water Valley
- North end: Highway 734

Highway 734
- Length: 268 km (167 mi)
- South end: Forestry Trunk Road
- Major intersections: Highway 584; Highway 591; Highway 752; Highway 11
- North end: Highway 40 south of Coalspur

Forestry Trunk Road (northern segment)
- Length: 168 km (104 mi)
- South end: Highway 40 at Muskeg River
- North end: Highway 43 west of Debolt

Location
- Country: Canada
- Province: Alberta
- Specialized and rural municipalities: Crowsnest Pass, M.D. of Ranchland No. 26, Kananaskis I.D., Bighorn No. 8 M.D., Clearwater County, Yellowhead County, Greenview No. 16 M.D.

Highway system
- Alberta Numbered Highway Network; List; Former
← Highway 733	→ Highway 735

Highway 734 is a highway in western Alberta, Canada that travels through the forested foothills of the Rocky Mountains. It used to be part of Forestry Trunk Road and is still colloquially referred to as such.

It is preceded by the remaining central segment of Forestry Trunk Road, Highway 734 begins south of the Red Deer River to the southwest of Sundre, and is succeeded by Highway 40, which also used to be part of Forestry Trunk Road. The highway ends north of the Pembina River.

Forestry Trunk Road was a north-south resource road that ran from the Crowsnest Highway (Highway 3) in southern Alberta to Highway 43 in northern Alberta. Over time, some segments of the road have been designated as parts of Highway 40 or Highway 734, while the northernmost segment between Highway 40 and Highway 43 is no longer named Forestry Trunk Road.

Two segments of Forestry Trunk Road remain – a southern segment from the Municipality of Crowsnest Pass to Highway 541 to the southwest of Longview, and a short central segment from Highway 579 west of Cremona to south of the Red Deer River. The southern segment is preceded and succeeded by the first and second segments of Highway 40 respectively, while the central segment is preceded by the third segment of Highway 40 and succeeded by Highway 734.

== Route description ==
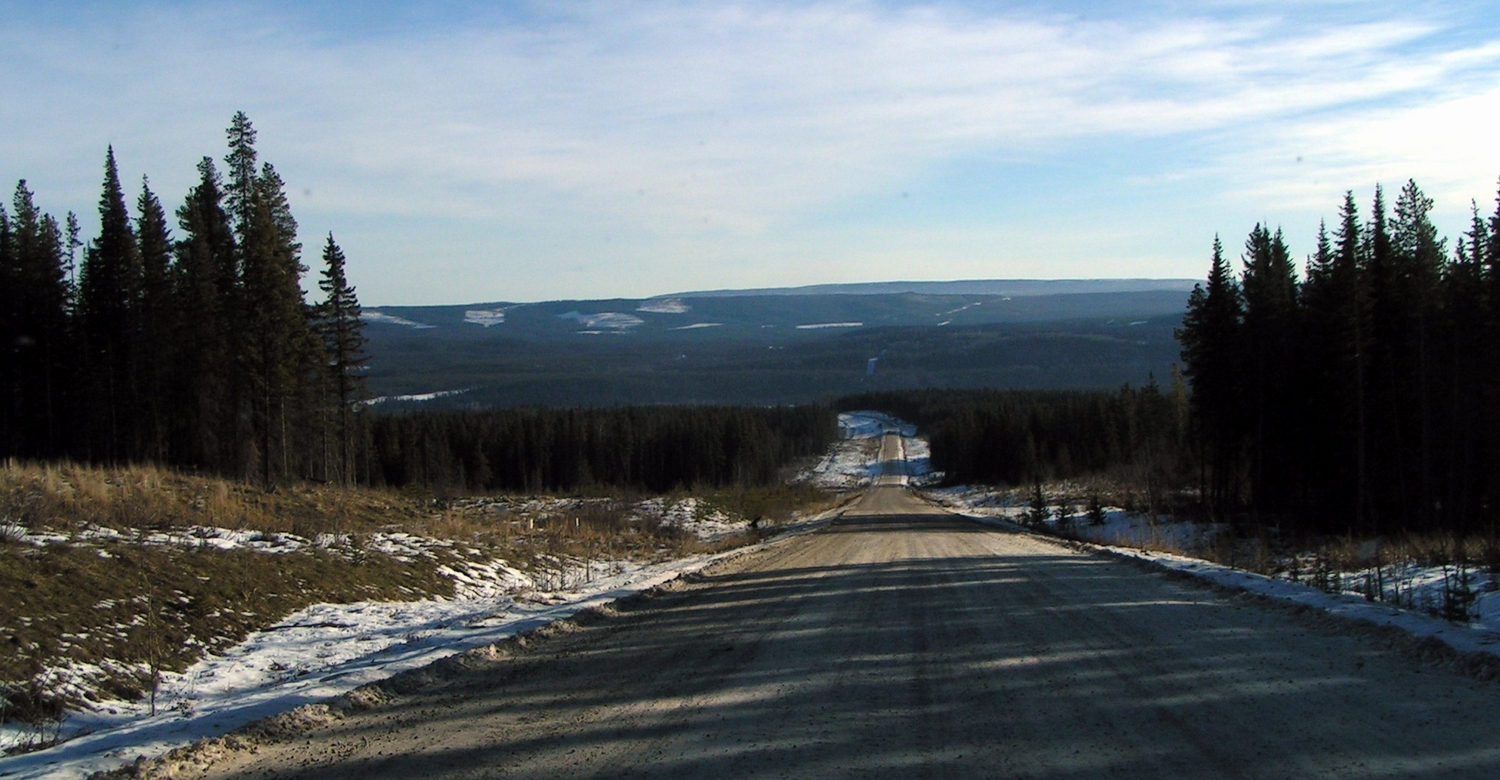
Highway 734 through the Foothills, southbound, north of Nordegg

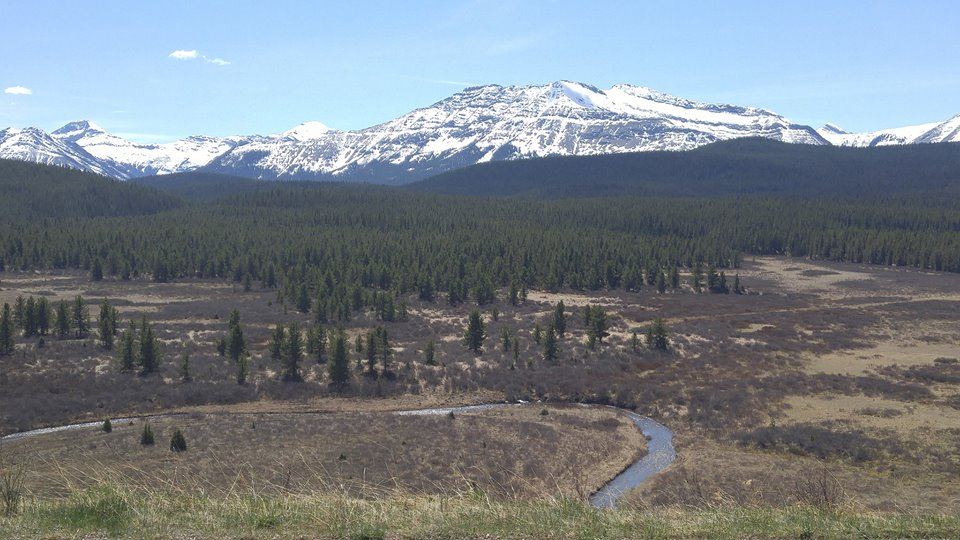
View from Highway 734 after crossing Corkscrew Mountain in May 2017

The southern remaining segment of Forestry Trunk Road begins 3.8 km (2.4 mi) north of the Crowsnest Highway (Highway 3) as a continuation of the southernmost segment of Highway 40. Over its 99 km (62 mi) length, the gravel road provides access to numerous public campgrounds, crosses the Oldman River, and intersects with Highway 532. It also passes near the Bob Creek Wildland Provincial Park, Livingstone Falls, and the Don Getty Wildland Provincial Park before ending at its intersection with Highway 541 and the second segment of Highway 40, which was part of Forestry Trunk Road before being designated a provincial highway.

Another former segment of Forestry Trunk Road, now the third segment of Highway 40, begins at Highway 1A to the west of Cochrane and ends 46 km (29 mi) later at an intersection with Highway 579. Highway 40 continues as the central remaining segment of Forestry Trunk Road for 27 km (17 mi) to a point 8 km (5.0 mi) prior to the Red Deer River. The road then continues for 268 km (167 mi) as Highway 734 to north of the Pembina River, north of the Elk River Indian reserve, where it becomes the fourth segment of Highway 40.

Over its course, the central segment of Forestry Trunk Road combined with Highway 734 provides access to Ram Falls Provincial Park and numerous campgrounds, and intersects Highway 579, Highway 584, Highway 591, Highway 752, and Highway 11 (David Thompson Highway) west of Nordegg. This stretch also crosses the Red Deer, James, Clearwater, Ram, North Saskatchewan, Blackstone, Brazeau, and Pembina rivers.

== Major intersections ==
Rural/specialized municipality	Location	km	mi	Destinations	Notes
Crowsnest Pass	Coleman	0.0	0.0	Highway 3 (Crowsnest Highway) – Fort Macleod, Fernie	Highway 40 southern terminus (southern section)
Crowsnest Pass–M. D. of Ranchland No. 66 boundary		3.8	2.4	Highway 40 ends	Highway 40 northern terminus (southern section); former Highway 940 southern terminus
M. D. of Ranchland No. 66		34.0	21.1	Maycroft Road (Township Road 104A) – Bob Creek Wildland Provincial Park	Former Highway 517 east
M. D. of Ranchland No. 66–Kananaskis I.D. boundary		73.4	45.6	Highway 532 east – Chain Lakes, Nanton	Highway 532 closed December 1-April 30
Kananaskis I.D. (Kananaskis Country)		80.0	49.7	Plateau Mountain Road	Section of Forestry Trunk Road closed December 1-April 30
Kananaskis I.D. (Kananaskis Country)		92.3	57.4	Cataract Creek	Section of Forestry Trunk Road closed December 1-April 30
Kananaskis I.D. (Kananaskis Country)		105.6	65.6	Highway 541 east – Longview; Highway 40 north – Kananaskis Village	Former Highway 940 northern terminus; Highway 40 southern terminus (central section); Highway 40 closed December 1-June 14
150 km (93 mi) gap
Rocky View County		254.6	158.2	Highway 1A (Bow Valley Trail) – Banff, Cochrane; Highway 40 begins	South end of Highway 40 concurrency
M.D. of Bighorn No. 8	Waiparous	271.6	168.8		
M.D. of Bighorn No. 8		300.5	186.7	Highway 579 east – Water Valley, Cremona; Highway 40 ends	North end of Highway 40 concurrency
M.D. of Bighorn No. 8–Clearwater County boundary		326.5 0.0	202.9 0.0	Highway 734 begins	Highway 734 southern terminus
Clearwater County		378.8 52.3	235.4 32.5	Highway 584 east – Sundre	
Clearwater County		399.8 73.3	248.4 45.5	Highway 591 east – Caroline	
Clearwater County		426.7 100.2	265.1 62.3	Highway 752 north – Rocky Mountain House	
Clearwater County		506.0 179.5	314.4 111.5	Crosses the North Saskatchewan River	
Clearwater County	Nordegg	517.1 190.6	321.3 118.4	Highway 11 – Saskatchewan River Crossing, Rocky Mountain House	
Yellowhead County	Elk River 233	585.5 259.0	363.8 160.9	Elk River Road (Lodgepole-Lovett Forestry Road)	
Yellowhead County		595.2 268.7	369.8 167.0	Crosses Lovett River	
Yellowhead County		595.2 268.7	369.8 167.0	Highway 734 ends Highway 40 begins	Highway 734 northern terminus; Highway 40 southern terminus (northern section)
Yellowhead County	Coalspur	628.3	390.4	Highway 47 begins Highway 40 north – Cadomin, Hinton	Highway 47 southern terminus; Forestry Trunk Road followed Highway 47
Yellowhead County	Robb	637.4	396.1	Highway 47 north / Robb Road – Edson	Forestry Trunk Road followed Robb Road
Hinton		675.2	419.5	Switzer Road	To Highway 16
114 km (71 mi) gap
M.D. of Greenview No. 16	Muskeg River	742.2	461.2	Highway 40 (Big Horn Highway) – Hinton, Grande Cache, Grande Prairie	Former Highway 734
M.D. of Greenview No. 16	Goodwin	910.9	566.0	Highway 43 – Grande Prairie, Valleyview, Edmonton	Former Highway 734
1.000 mi = 1.609 km; 1.000 km = 0.621 mi: Closed/former; Concurrency terminus; Route transition
