= Bob Creek Wildland Provincial Park =

Wildland provincial park in southern Alberta, Canada

- IUCN category Ib (wilderness area)
- Location within Alberta Location within Canada Location within M.D. of Ranchland
- Location: Municipal District of Ranchland, Alberta, Canada
- Nearest city: Claresholm
- Coordinates: 50°00′00″N 114°20′00″W
- Area: 20,777.69 ha (80.2231 sq mi)
- Established: 12 May 1999
- Governing body: Alberta Parks

Bob Creek Wildland Provincial Park is a wildland provincial park located in the Municipal District of Ranchland, in southern Alberta, Canada. It was established on 12 May 1999, modified slightly on 24 June 2003, and is 20,777.69 hectares (51,342.8 acres; 80.2 mi^{2}) in area. The park is included in the South Saskatchewan Region Land Use Framework and administered by the South Saskatchewan Regional Plan. Because they are so intertwined, Bob Creek Wildland and Black Creek Heritage Rangeland are managed through the same Management Plan. The park gets its name from the Bob Creek that runs through the center of the park and drains the surrounding hills.

== Location ==
The park is located approximately 50 kilometres (31 mi) west of Claresholm and located between Alberta Highway 40 to the west and Highway 22 to the east and largely north of the Oldman River. Much of the eastern and southern borders of the park is shared with Black Creek Heritage Rangeland. The park is located on east of the Rocky Mountains on the eastern slopes of the Livingstone Range and contains "The Whaleback" ridge: "The Whaleback [...] encompasses the most extensive, least disturbed and relatively unfragmented Montane landscape in Alberta’s Rocky Mountain natural region." The park is accessed through two points in the southern boundary. The Livingston Gap on the southwest corner of the park where the Oldman River cuts through the Livingstone Range as it leaves the Rocky Mountains. And Bob Creek Staging Area through the south-central boundary of the park.

== Ecology ==
The park contains the Alpine, Sub-Alpine and Montane subregions of the Rocky Mountain Natural Region in the Alberta classification system. Together, Bob Creek Wildland and Black Creek Heritage Rangeland preserves the largest tract of montane ecosystems in Alberta. The Whaleback Ridge is the last remaining area of montane wilderness in Alberta. In the National Ecological Framework for Canada used by Environment and Climate Change Canada, the park is in the Blairmore Foothills and Crowsnest Mountains ecodistricts of the Northern Continental Divide ecoregion of the Columbia Montane Cordillera ecoprovince of the Montane Cordillera ecozone. Under the OneEarth classification (previously World Wildlife Fund), the park is in the Northern Rockies conifer forests ecoregion of the Greater Rockies & Mountain Forests bioregion.

=== Geography ===
The geography of the park is rolling fescue grasslands with steep ridges transitioning from grass to forests and many springs and streams along the valley bottoms. The park's geology is folded and faulted sedimentary rock with major fault lines creating ridges. This underlying rock underwent several glaciations and erosion events to create the current topography. The park contains three named ridges while wide valley floors separate the ridges. The eastern ridge, running north to south for approximately 29 km (18 mi), is the Whaleback ridge. Whaleback Peak is at an elevation of 1,783 m (5,850 ft), up from the eastern park boundary of 1,440 m (4,720 ft). On the western boundary is two ridges. The Livingstone ridge, again running north to south, occupies the southern half of the west boundary. From an elevation of 1,394 m (4,573 ft) at the Oldman River at the Livingstone Gap, the Livingstone Ridge climbs going north to an elevation of 2,171 m (7,123 ft) at Thrift Peak. Cutting into the park from the west is the Chaffen Ridge running northeast to southwest. The peak elevation of the Chaffen Ridge in the park is 2,194 m (7,198 ft).

=== Climate ===

The Köppen climate classification of the park is Continental, Subarctic (Dfc) characterized by long, cold, dry winters, and short, cool, moist summers. Using the data from nearby weather stations, Livingstone and Livingstone Gap Auto, for 1991 to 2020, the average daily temperatures exceeds 10 °C (50 °F) only for July and August while average daily temperatures are less than 0 °C (32 °F) for November through March. Livingstone is to the northwest of the park while Livingstone Gap Auto is to the southwest. At Livingstone, the long-run average precipitation from 1991 to 2020 for the wettest month, June, exceeds 110 mm (4.3 in) per month while Livingstone Gap Auto was only about 75 mm (3.0 in) per month. Conversely, the stations receive less than 50 mm (2.0 in) per month from October through March. Strong Chinook winds, which are common during the winter, and low humidity keep the area intermittently snow-free.

=== Vegetation ===
South and west-facing slopes and valley bottoms in the park tend to be drier sites and are covered with grasses. Bluebunch Wheatgrass, oatgrasses, and rough fescue are the dominant grasses. Dominance is affected by elevation, moisture, grazing intensity, and brush and forest encroachment. The bottom of valleys and Riparian zones tend to be moister and contain an abundance and variety of forbs. Rare, uncommon, or unusual plants are found in the protected areas: conimitella, linear-leaved scorpionweed, Pacific bluegrass, silvery everlasting, woolly hawkweed, and yellow paintbrush.

At higher elevations and particularly on north and north-east facing slopes grow coniferous forests. Trees and shrubs are found in moist, sheltered locations including valley bottoms and hillsides. Dominant tree species include aspen, Balsam Poplar, Douglas fir, lodgepole pine, and white spruce. Other trees include Engelmann spruce, Limber Pine Subalpine Fir and Whitebark Pine. Dominant shrubs include bog birch, Creeping Juniper, Rocky Mountain goldenrod, shrubby cinquefoil and several willow species.

=== Wildlife ===
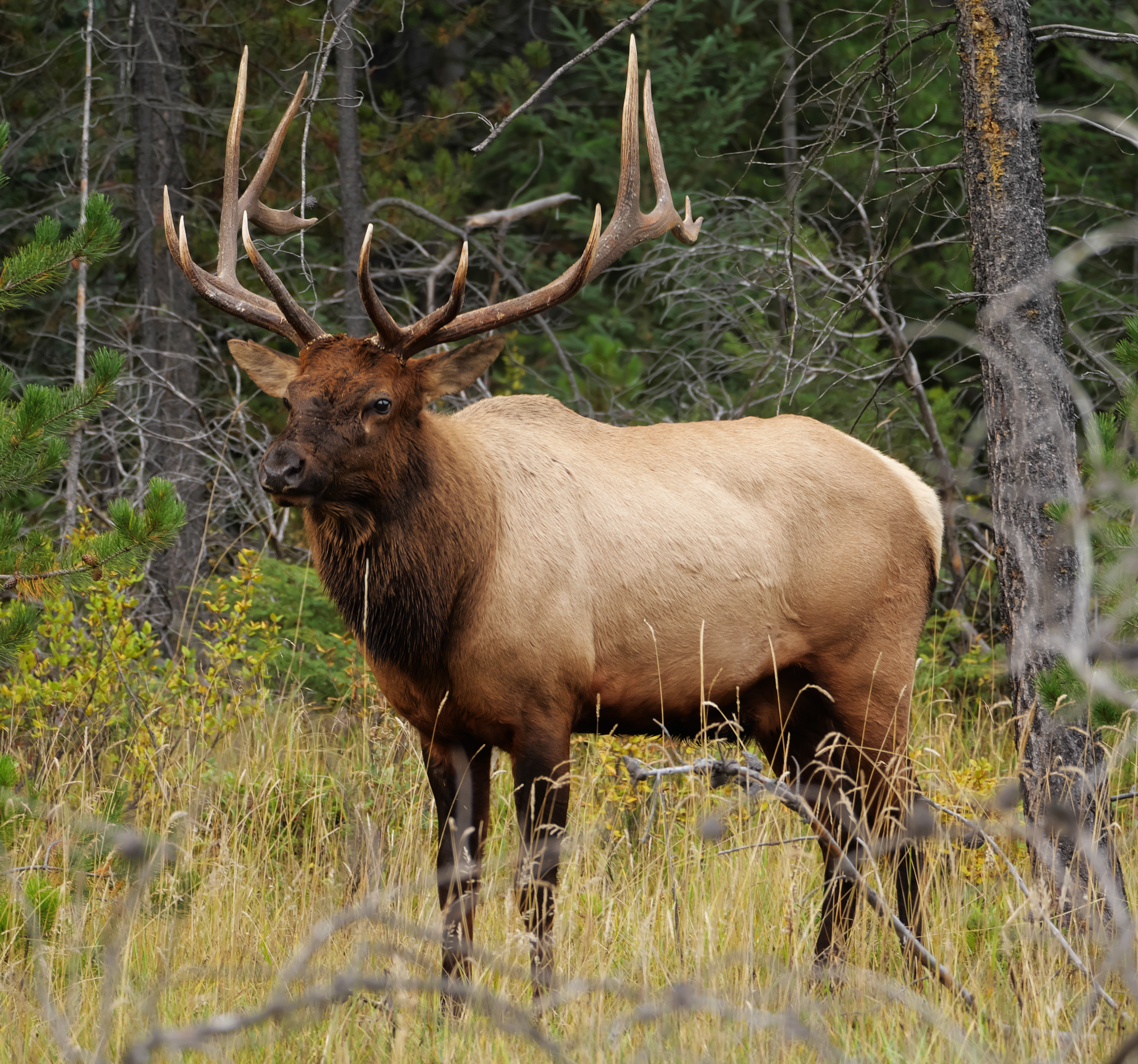
Elk with Antlers

The parks are unique in Alberta as the warm Chinook winds clear the snow cover and produce one of Alberta's most important elk wintering ranges. The park is one of the two most significant elk wintering ranges within the province. Mule deer also winter in the park.

Carnivores regularly in the park include cougars, coyotes, and wolves. American black bears and grizzly bears frequent the park in the summer as they migrate through and forage for food.

The park is located within Wildlife Management Units where Alberta Fish and Wildlife staff regularly inventory wildlife populations. Hunting is permitted to manage the level of wildlife obtained through these inventories to maintain a healthy population and environment. As of July 2011, the following species can be hunted: black bear, cougar, elk, moose, mule deer, white-tailed deer, and wolves.

Within the park, the Oldman River contains bull trout, cutthroat trout, rainbow trout, and mountain whitefish. White Creek contains cutthroat trout and bull trout while Camp Creek produces a cutthroat trout/rainbow trout hybrid. Bob Creek contains cutthroat trout. The Oldman River and the streams within the park are major destinations for trout fishermen. The river and streams are managed under the Eastern Slopes trout stream regulations and are managed through seasonal closures and restrictive possession limits. The Oldman River fishery is managed under a “catch and release” regulation. Streams are managed with catch and minimum size limits and seasonal closures.

== Activities ==
Backcountry hiking and camping are permitted in the park. In addition, hunting and fishing are allowed when properly licensed. The park has extensive trails for horse back trail riding and off-highway vehicles, defined as snowmobiles and quads. Motorized vehicles must remain of established trails. No off trail use is permitted. Normally, the use of off-highway and highway vehicles are not permitted in Heritage Rangeland like Black Creek; however, legislation was created to allow vehicle use on two trails in Black Creek to access Bob Creek. Those trails are the Bob Creek Trail and the Camp Creek Trail. The use of off-highway vehicles is controversial.

== See also ==
- List of provincial parks in Alberta
- List of Canadian provincial parks
- Ecology of the Rocky Mountains
