= Benjamin Thorpe (priest) =

Canadian Anglican priest

Benjamin James Thorpe was a Canadian Anglican priest, most notably Archdeacon of St Andrews in the Diocese of Montreal from 1967 until 1974.

Thorpe was educated at McGill University and the Montreal Diocesan Theological College and ordained in 1931. After a curacy at Clarendon, he held incumbencies in Montreal, Pointe-Claire, Goodwin, Lachute, and Valleyfield.
