= Lovett River =

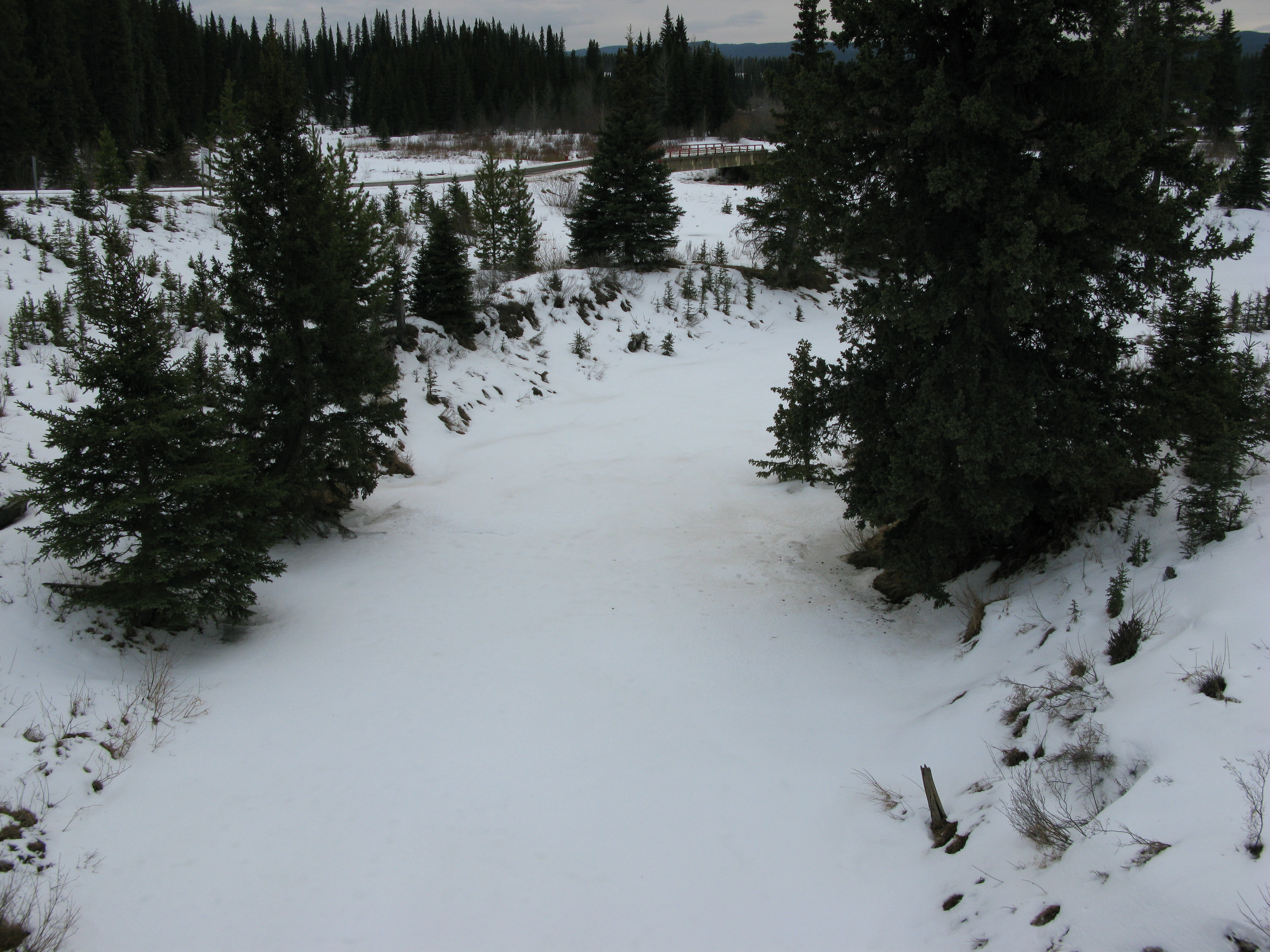
- The Lovett River from Alberta Highway 734

Location
- Country: Canada
- Province: Alberta

Physical characteristics
- Source
  - location: Lovett River Headwaters
  - coordinates: 53°04′41″N 116°53′59″W
  - elevation: 1,427 m (4,682 ft)
- Mouth
  - location: Pembina River
  - coordinates: 52°59′11″N 116°38′20″W
  - elevation: 1,330 m (4,360 ft)

The Lovett River is a short river in the Alberta foothills. The Lovett is an early tributary of the Pembina River, itself a major tributary of the Athabasca River. The Lovett River was formerly known as the Little Pembina River, but to avoid confusion its name was changed. The new name was derived from Lovettville, a defunct coal mining town in the vicinity. The settlement took its name from H. A. Lovett, President of North American Collieries, a mining company in the area.

== Course ==
The river forms in the foothills south of Coalspur, Alberta. It flows in a general southwest direction before being bridged by Alberta Highway 40/Alberta Highway 734. It passes through an active coal mining area and a few minor natural gas fields, as well as former coal mining towns that are now ghost towns. It then drains into the Pembina River

== See also ==
- List of Alberta rivers
