= Winchell Lake, Alberta =

Lake in Alberta, Canada

Winchell Lake
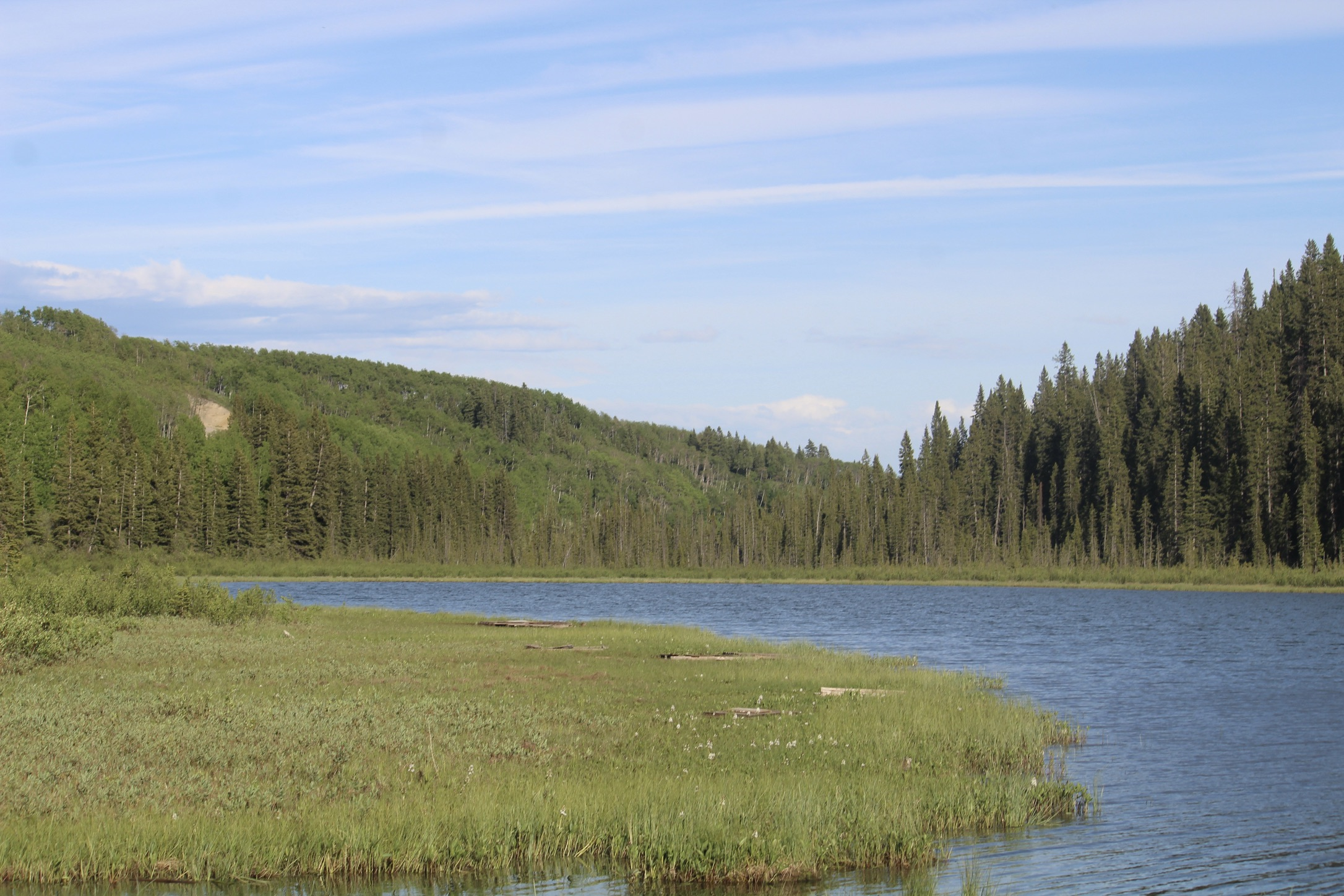
- Winchell Lake in June

- Location within Alberta
- Location: Mountain View County, Alberta
- Coordinates: 51°27′17″N 114°36′33″W
- Catchment area: 30 square kilometres (12 sq mi)
- Basin countries: Canada
- Max. length: 0.67 km (0.42 mi)
- Max. width: 0.13 km (0.081 mi)
- Surface area: 0.05 square kilometres (0.019 sq mi)
- Max. depth: approx. 7 metres (23 ft)
- Shore length^{1}: 1.47 kilometres (0.91 mi)
- ^{1} Shore length is not a well-defined measure.

Winchell Lake is a small lake and recreation area in Mountain View County, Alberta, Canada located roughly 5 km (3.1 mi) south of the unincorporated community of Water Valley and 30 km (19 mi) northwest of the town of Cochrane. The lake is a popular fishing and day use destination, and is stocked annually with Rainbow trout. The nearby neighbourhood of Winchell Lake Estates is considered part of Water Valley by Mountain View County.

== Description ==
Winchell Lake is a narrow and deep lake that is surrounded entirely by the Winchell Lake Recreation Area, a day use park that is operated by Mountain View County. The recreation area has a parking lot with an outhouse and a boat launch. The lake has multiple wooden pallets for fishing and is surrounded by an area of peaty marsh spanning approximately 3 km (1.9 mi) with two other unnamed ponds on either end of the lake. The recreation area includes a 1.02 km (0.63 mi) trail along the northwest shore of the lake.

Hunting and camping are not permitted.

== Flora and fauna ==
The lake and its surrounding area is home to a diverse array of plants and animals. There are at least 76 recorded bird species, with common ones including loons, waxwings, siskins, grosbeak, blue jays and multiple species of sparrows and warblers. During the winter, northern pygmy-owl, great grey owl, and barred owl are sometimes seen. Mammals include Moose, White-tailed deer, and Canadian beaver. Common plants include bogbean, marsh cinquefoil, hooded lady's tresses, variegated yellow pond-lily, yellow lady's slipper, marsh grass of Parnassus, and Huron green orchid.
