= Ram River =

River in Alberta, Canada

Location
- Country: Canada
- Province: Alberta

Physical characteristics
- Source
  - location: Ram River Glacier
  - coordinates: 51°53′19″N 116°10′59″W
  - elevation: 2,374 m (7,789 ft)
- Mouth
  - location: North Saskatchewan River
  - coordinates: 52°22′32″N 115°24′06″W
  - elevation: 1,048 m (3,438 ft)

The Ram River is a river rising in the Alberta Rocky Mountains. It flows eastward, taking on the North Ram River, before joining the North Saskatchewan River near the Town of Rocky Mountain House. The name Ram Rivulet appears on a David Thompson map of 1814. A ram is a male Rocky Mountain Sheep.

The Ram River is characterized by numerous waterfalls and deep canyons throughout its course. It is first bridged by Alberta Highway 734, and again by a secondary road above its confluence with the North Saskatchewan River. Ram Falls Provincial Recreation Area is also located on the river.

== Tributaries ==
- Hummingbird Creek
  - Canary Creek, Onion Creek, Onion Lake
- Lynx Creek
- North Ram River
  - Farley Lake, Kiska Creek, Joyce River, Lynch Creek, Phillip Creek, Pinto Creek
- Fall Creek
- Tawdina Creek

== See also ==
- List of Alberta rivers
