= Ram Falls Provincial Park =

Provincial park in Alberta, Canada

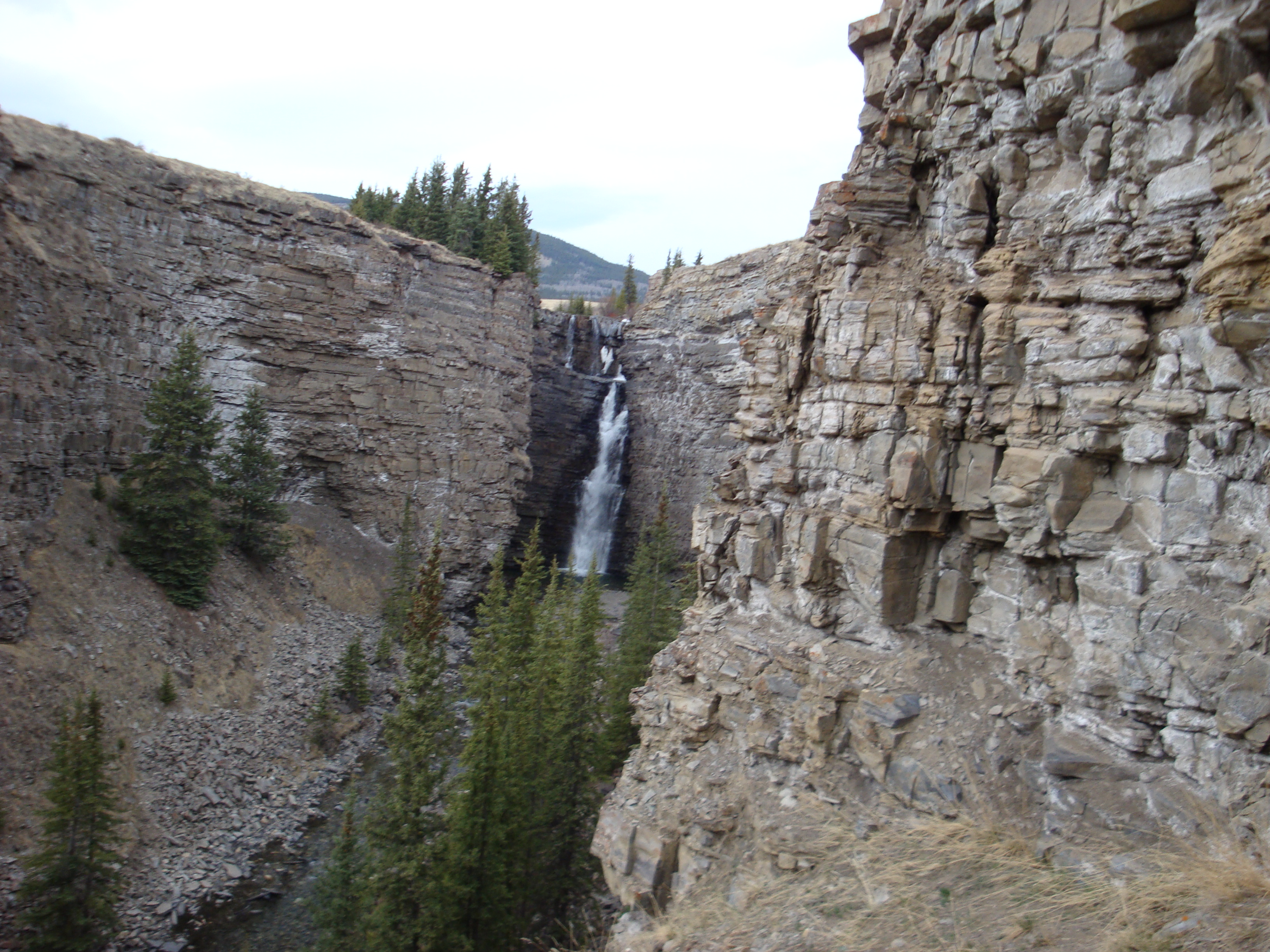

- Location within Alberta
- Interactive map of Ram Falls Provincial Park
- Location: Clearwater County, Alberta, Canada
- Nearest city: Nordegg; Rocky Mountain House
- Coordinates: 52°5′49″N 115°50′21″W
- Governing body: Alberta Tourism, Parks and Recreation

Ram Falls Provincial Park is a provincial park in Alberta, Canada, located 64 km (40 mi) south of Nordegg and 95 km (59 mi) west of Rocky Mountain House on Highway 734.

The park is situated in the Canadian Rockies foothills, along the Ram River valley, in a section dominated by steep river banks with small lakes divided by waterfalls, at an elevation of 1,570 m (5,150 ft).

== Activities ==
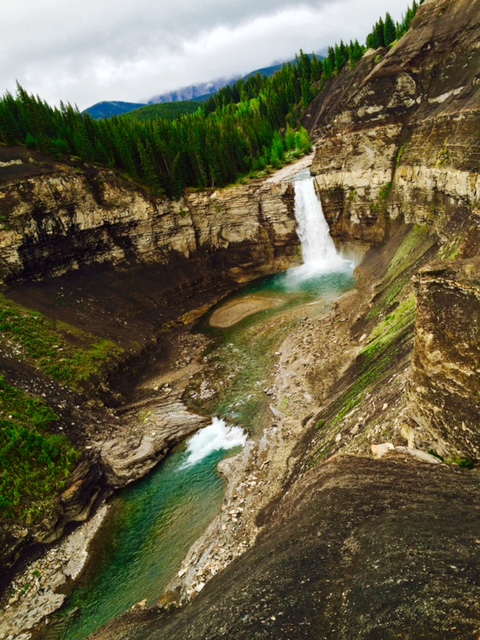
Ram Falls

The following activities are available in the park:

- Bird watching (Golden eagles, bald eagles, merlins, American kestrels and American dippers)
- Camping
- Cross-country skiing and back-country skiing
- Fishing (bull trout, westslope cutthroat trout, mountain whitefish)
- Front country hiking
- Horseback riding (but horses are not permitted in the recreation area)
- Off-site OHV and snowmobile riding
- Wildlife watching

== See also ==
- List of provincial parks in Alberta
- List of Canadian provincial parks
- List of National Parks of Canada
