= Muskeg River, Alberta =

Locality in Alberta, Canada

Coordinates: 53.91661°N 118.64994°W

Location of Muskeg River in Alberta

Muskeg River is a locality in northern Alberta, Canada within the Municipal District of Greenview No. 16.

== Geography ==
It is located at the junction of the Bighorn Highway (Highway 40) and Forestry Trunk Road (former Highway 734), approximately 35 kilometers (22 mi) east of Grande Cache. It has an elevation of 1,250 meters (4,100 ft).

The Muskeg River flows through the community and north into the Smoky River.

== See also ==
- List of communities in Alberta
- List of settlements in Alberta
