= Waiparous =

- Summer village
- Summer Village of Waiparous
- Location of Waiparous in Alberta
- Coordinates: 51.28208°N 114.84095°W
- Country: Canada
- Province: Alberta
- Census division: No. 15

Government
  - Mayor: Cheryl Wauthier
  - Governing body: Waiparous Summer Village Council

Area (2021)
  - Land: 0.41 km^{2} (0.16 sq mi)

Population (2021)
  - Total: 57
  - Density: 140.6/km^{2} (364/sq mi)
- Time zone: UTC−06:00 (Alberta Time)
- Website: Official website

Waiparous /ˈwaɪprəs/ is a summer village in Alberta, Canada. It is located along Highway 40, at the crossing of Waiparous Creek, approximately 32 kilometres (20 mi) of driving west of Cochrane.

== Demographics ==
In the 2021 Census of Population conducted by Statistics Canada, the Summer Village of Waiparous had a population of 57 living in 26 of its 52 total private dwellings, a change of 16.3% from its 2016 population of 49. With a land area of 0.41 km^{2} (0.16 sq mi), it had a population density of 139.0/km^{2} (360.1/sq mi) in 2021.

In the 2016 Census of Population conducted by Statistics Canada, the Summer Village of Waiparous had a population of 49 living in 23 of its 48 total private dwellings, a 16.7% change from its 2011 population of 42. With a land area of 0.41 km^{2} (0.16 sq mi), it had a population density of 119.5/km^{2} (309.5/sq mi) in 2016.

== See also ==
- List of communities in Alberta
- List of summer villages in Alberta
- List of resort villages in Saskatchewan
