= Oatgrass =

Oatgrass is a common name for several plants and may refer to:

- Arrhenatherum, oatgrass or button-grass
- Avenula pubescens, downy oat-grass or downy alpine oatgrass
- Danthonia californica, California oatgrass
- plants of the genus Trisetum are known as oatgrass
- Oats, young plants of which may be referred to as "oat grass"
