= Alberta Highway 40 =

Highway in Alberta, Canada

Highway 40
- Bighorn Highway, Kananaskis Trail, Forestry Trunk Road
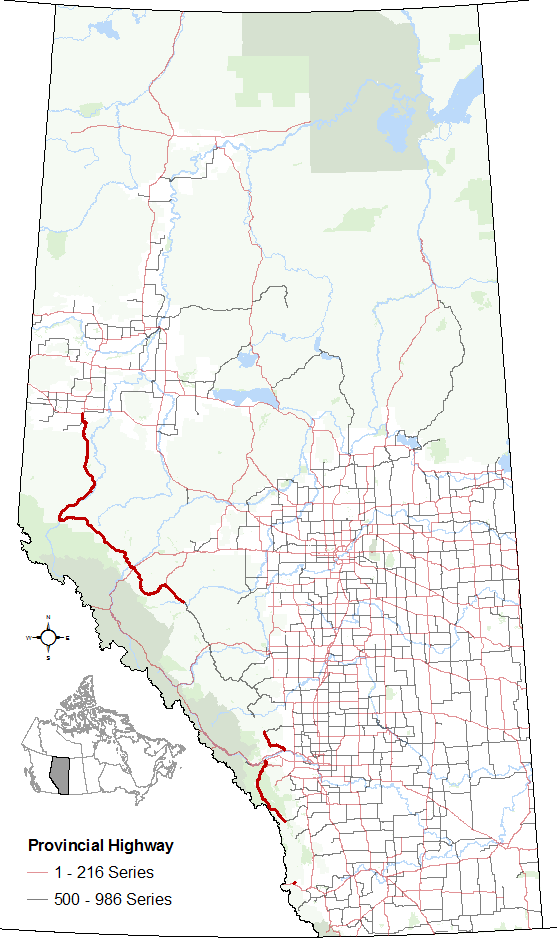

Route information
- Maintained by Alberta Transportation
- Restrictions: Annually closed between Peter Lougheed Provincial Park and Hwy 541 from December 1 - June 14.

Crowsnest Pass segment
- Length: 3.8 km (2.4 mi)
- South end: Highway 3 in Coleman
- North end: Forestry Trunk Road north of Coleman

Kananaskis Trail segment
- Length: 104.6 km (65.0 mi)
- South end: Highway 541 in Highwood House
- North end: Highway 1 (TCH) south of Seebe

Forestry Trunk Road segment
- Length: 45.9 km (28.5 mi)
- South end: Highway 1A east of Ghost Lake
- North end: Highway 579 north of Waiparous

Northern segment
- Length: 443.3 km (275.5 mi)
- South end: Highway 734 south of Coalspur
- Major intersections: Highway 47 in Coalspur; Highway 16 (TCH) in Hinton
- North end: Highway 43 in Grande Prairie

Location
- Country: Canada
- Province: Alberta
- Specialized and rural municipalities: Crowsnest Pass, M.D. of Ranchland No. 66, Kananaskis I.D., M.D. of Bighorn No. 8, Rocky View County, Yellowhead County, M.D. Greenview No. 16, County of Grande Prairie No. 1
- Major cities: Grande Prairie
- Towns: Hinton

Highway system
- Alberta Numbered Highway Network; List; Former
← Highway 39	→ Highway 41

Highway 40 is a south–north highway in western Alberta, Canada. It is also named Bighorn Highway and Kananaskis Trail in Kananaskis Country. Its segmented sections extend from Coleman in the Municipality of Crowsnest Pass northward to the City of Grande Prairie and is currently divided into four sections.

== Route description ==
The southernmost section is gravel; it runs for 3.8 km (2.4 mi) through the Municipality of Crowsnest Pass, where it then becomes the Forestry Trunk Road to Highway 541, which has a combined length of 106 km (66 mi).

The second section of Highway 40 is Kananaskis Trail, which is paved and runs through Kananaskis Country for 105 km (65 mi) from Highway 541, over Highwood Pass, and through Peter Lougheed Provincial Park and Spray Valley Provincial Park. The highway passes Kananaskis Village before terminating at the Trans-Canada Highway (Highway 1).

The third section is gravel and is part of the Forestry Trunk Road, which runs 46 km (29 mi) from Highway 1A to Highway 579. The highway continues as the Forestry Trunk Road and Highway 734 for approximately 293 km (182 mi), through the Rocky Mountains Forest Reserve. The intention is that one day the entire road will be a continuous paved highway. In the past, other gravel sections were named Highway 940; the 900 series in Alberta is used for temporary names. There is no signed connection between the Kananaskis Trail section and the Forestry Trunk Road section; however, it is connected by using Highway 1, Highway 1X, and Highway 1A between Seebe and Ghost Lake.

The fourth section is 443 km (275 mi) and runs from the Lovett River in Yellowhead County to the City of Grande Prairie. The 61-kilometre (38 mi) section south of Cadomin is gravel while the remainder is paved. The highway shares a 2-kilometre (1.2 mi) concurrency with the Yellowhead Highway (Highway 16), before continuing north and passing through the Hamlet of Grande Cache en route to Grande Prairie.

In Grande Prairie, Highway 40 becomes 108 Street. It formerly terminated at 100 Avenue where it met Highway 43; however, when Highway 43X was completed in 2019, the Highway 43 designation was moved to the new bypass and the Highway 40 designation was applied to 100 Avenue to connect to the new Highway 43 alignment, extending Highway 40 by 7.5 km (4.7 mi).

== Old Highway 40 ==
A section of what is today Alberta Highway 501 on the south edge of the province, running between Cardston and Whiskey Gap was originally designated as Highway 40 prior to the 1970s. A further section of roadway marked Old Highway 40 runs south of Highway 501 from a junction south of Taylorville, and runs to the U.S. border. The only location of note along this roadway is a stone monument to Mormon settlers.

== Highway 40X ==
The Province of Alberta is planning a bypass of southwestern Grande Prairie that is currently designated as Highway 40X. The route is to start at Highway 40, between the Wapiti River and Highway 668, and link to Highway 43 on the city's western edge. The Functional planning was completed in 2010 but construction still is unfunded.

== Major intersections ==
Starting from the south end of Highway 40:

Rural/specialized municipality	Location	km	mi	Destinations	Notes
Crowsnest Pass	Coleman	0.0	0.0	Highway 3 (Crowsnest Highway) – Fort Macleod, Fernie	Southern terminus
Crowsnest Pass–M. D. of Ranchland No. 66 boundary		3.8	2.4	Forestry Trunk Road	North end of Highway 40; former Highway 940 north; continues as Forestry Trunk Road
102 km (63 mi) gap in Highway 40
Kananaskis I.D. (Kananaskis Country)		105.5	65.6	Highway 541 east – Longview Forestry Trunk Road	South end of Kananaskis Trail; former Highway 940 south; continues as Highway 541
Kananaskis I.D. (Kananaskis Country)		105.5	65.6	Winter closure gate	
Kananaskis I.D. (Kananaskis Country)		Highway 40 closed December 1-June 14			
Kananaskis I.D. (Kananaskis Country)		143.2	89.0	Highwood Pass – el. 2,206 m (7,238 ft)	
Kananaskis I.D. (Kananaskis Country)	Peter Lougheed Provincial Park	162.9	101.2	Winter closure gate	
Kananaskis I.D. (Kananaskis Country)	Peter Lougheed Provincial Park	162.9	101.2	Kananaskis Lakes Trail	Former Highway 742 north
Kananaskis I.D. (Kananaskis Country)		187.1	116.3	Mount Allan Drive – Kananaskis Village, Nakiska	
Kananaskis I.D. (Kananaskis Country)		202.3	125.7	Highway 68 east (Sibbald Creek Trail)	
Stoney I.R. Nos. 142, 143, and 144		210.1	130.6	Highway 1 (TCH) – Canmore, Banff, Calgary	Interchange; Highway 1 exit 118; north end of Kananaskis Trail
45 km (28 mi) gap in Highway 40
Rocky View County		254.6	158.2	Highway 1A (Bow Valley Trail) – Canmore, Cochrane	South end of Forestry Trunk Road concurrency
M.D. of Bighorn No. 8	Waiparous	271.6	168.8		
M.D. of Bighorn No. 8		300.5	186.7	Highway 579 east – Water Valley, Cremona Forestry Trunk Road to Highway 734 – Nordegg	North end of Highway 40; continues as Forestry Trunk Road
306 km (190 mi) gap in Highway 40
Yellowhead County		595.2	369.8	Highway 734 south (Forestry Trunk Road)	South end of Highway 40; continues as Highway 734 (Forestry Trunk Road)
Yellowhead County		595.2	369.8	Crosses the Lovett River	
Yellowhead County	Coalspur	628.3	390.4	Highway 47 north – Robb, Edson	
Yellowhead County		639.1	397.1	Crosses the McLeod River	
Yellowhead County	Cadomin	657.6	408.6		
Yellowhead County	Hinton	705.4	438.3	Highway 16 (TCH/YH) east – Edmonton	South end of Highway 16 concurrency
Yellowhead County		707.3	439.5	Highway 16 (TCH/YH) west – Jasper	North end of Highway 16 concurrency; south end of Big Horn Highway
Yellowhead County	Entrance	712.1	442.5	Crosses the Athabasca River	
Yellowhead County		713.0	443.0	Brule Road – Brule	
Yellowhead County		735.3	456.9	PAR 123 – William A. Switzer Provincial Park	
M.D. of Greenview No. 16	Muskeg River	813.6	505.5	Forestry Trunk Road	Former Highway 734 north
M.D. of Greenview No. 16	Grande Cache	845.1	525.1	Hoppe Avenue, 100 Avenue	
M.D. of Greenview No. 16	Grande Cache	850.2	528.3	Crosses the Smoky River	
M.D. of Greenview No. 16		1,010.3	627.8	Township Road 700 to Highway 666 – Grovedale	Roundabout
M.D. of Greenview No. 16		1,019.5	633.5	Highway 666 west – Grovedale	Grade separated; southbound exit and northbound entrance
↑ / ↓		1,019.6	633.6	Crosses the Wapiti River	
County of Grande Prairie No. 1		1,024.5	636.6	Highway 668 east / Township Road 710	
City of Grande Prairie		1,031.0	640.6	100 Avenue / 108 Street to Highway 2 / Highway 43 – City Centre, Edmonton	Former Highway 40 northern terminus; former Highway 43 alignment; Highway 40 follows 100 Avenue west
City of Grande Prairie		1,034.3	642.7	124 Street – Grande Prairie Airport	
City of Grande Prairie		1,038.5– 1,039.5	645.3– 645.9	Highway 43 – Beaverlodge, Dawson Creek, Edmonton	Highway 40 northern terminus; future Highway 40X south; continues as Highway 43 west
1.000 mi = 1.609 km; 1.000 km = 0.621 mi: Concurrency terminus; Incomplete access; Route transition

== Gallery ==
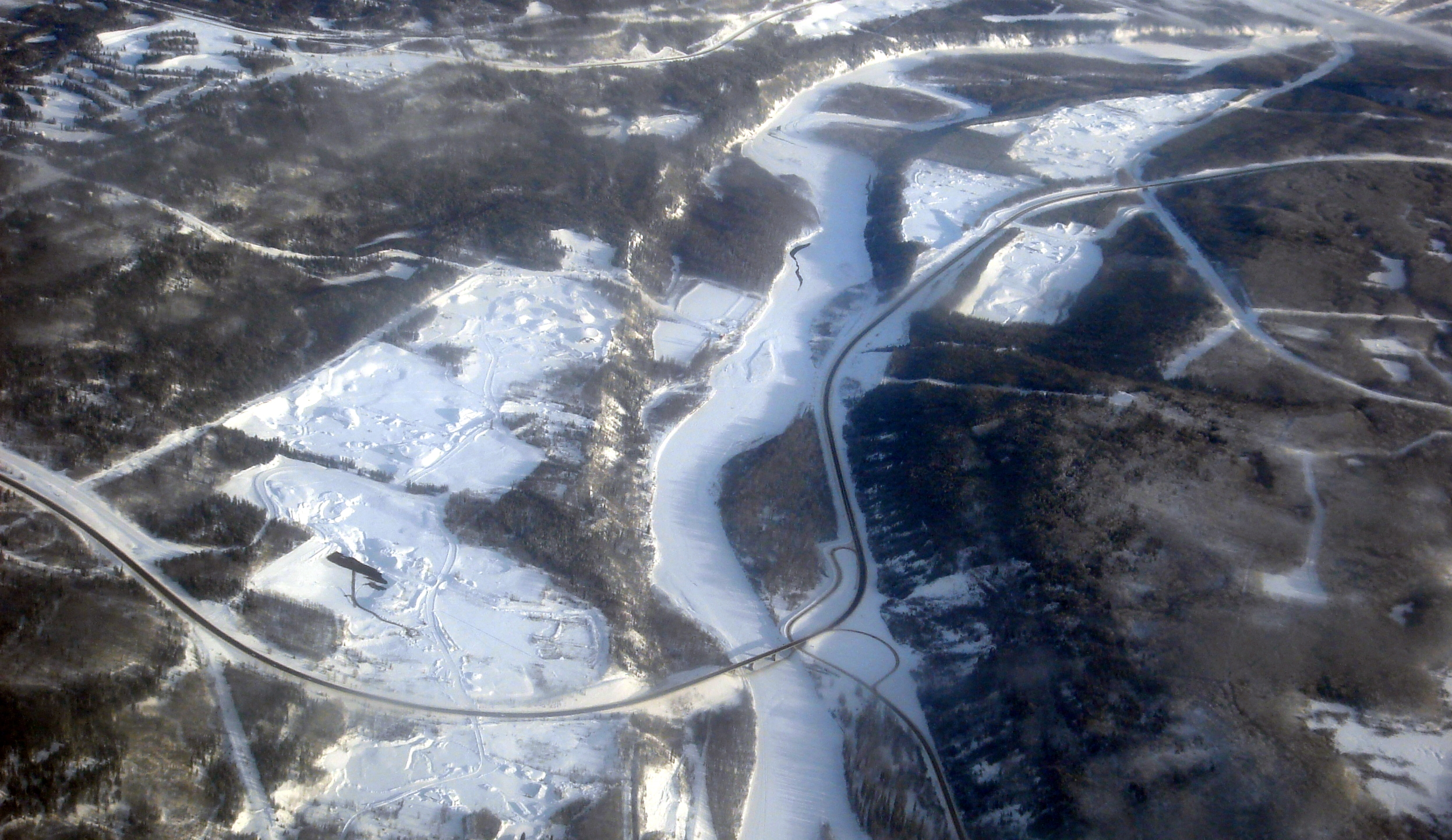
Highway 40 crossing Wapiti River south of Grande Prairie

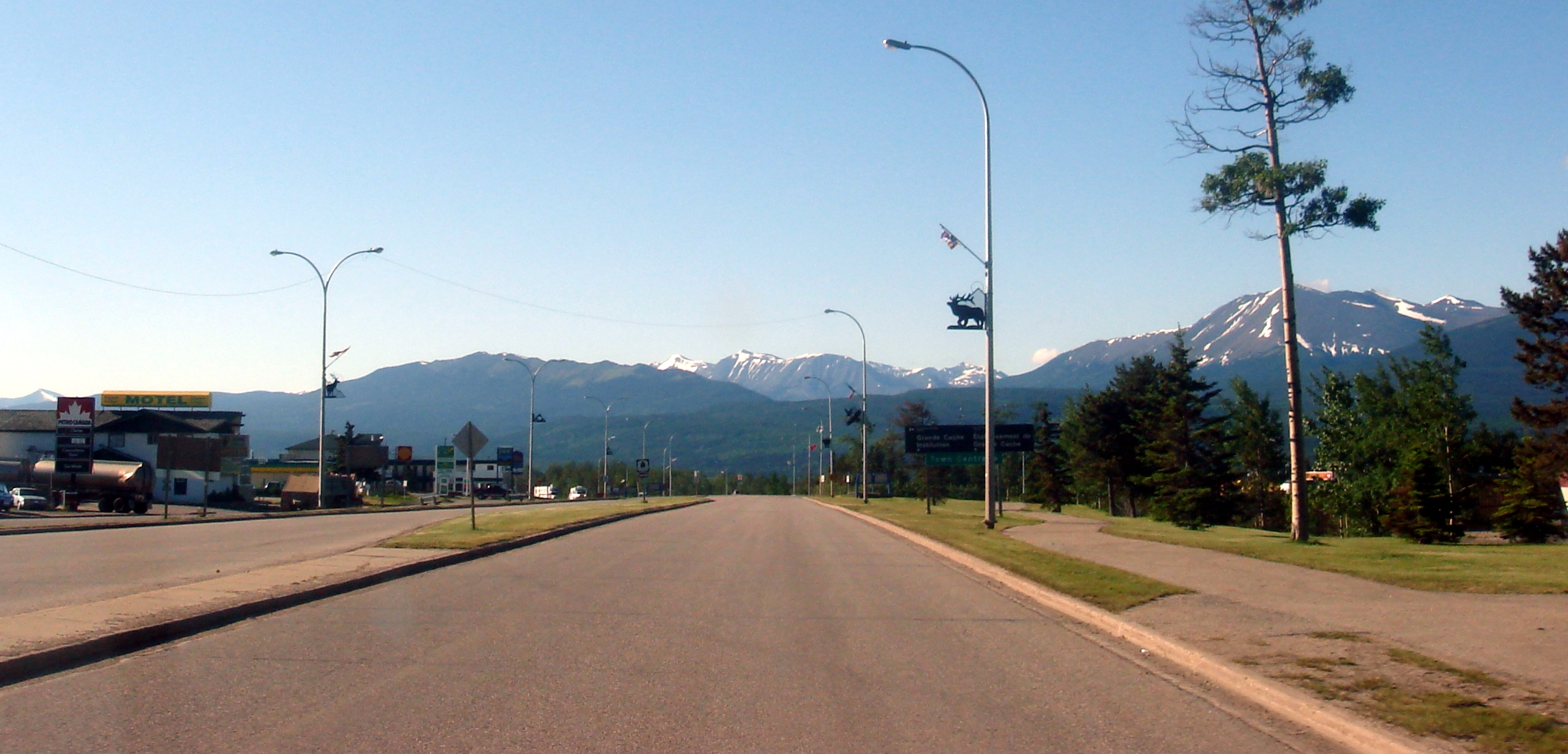
Highway 40 in Grande Cache

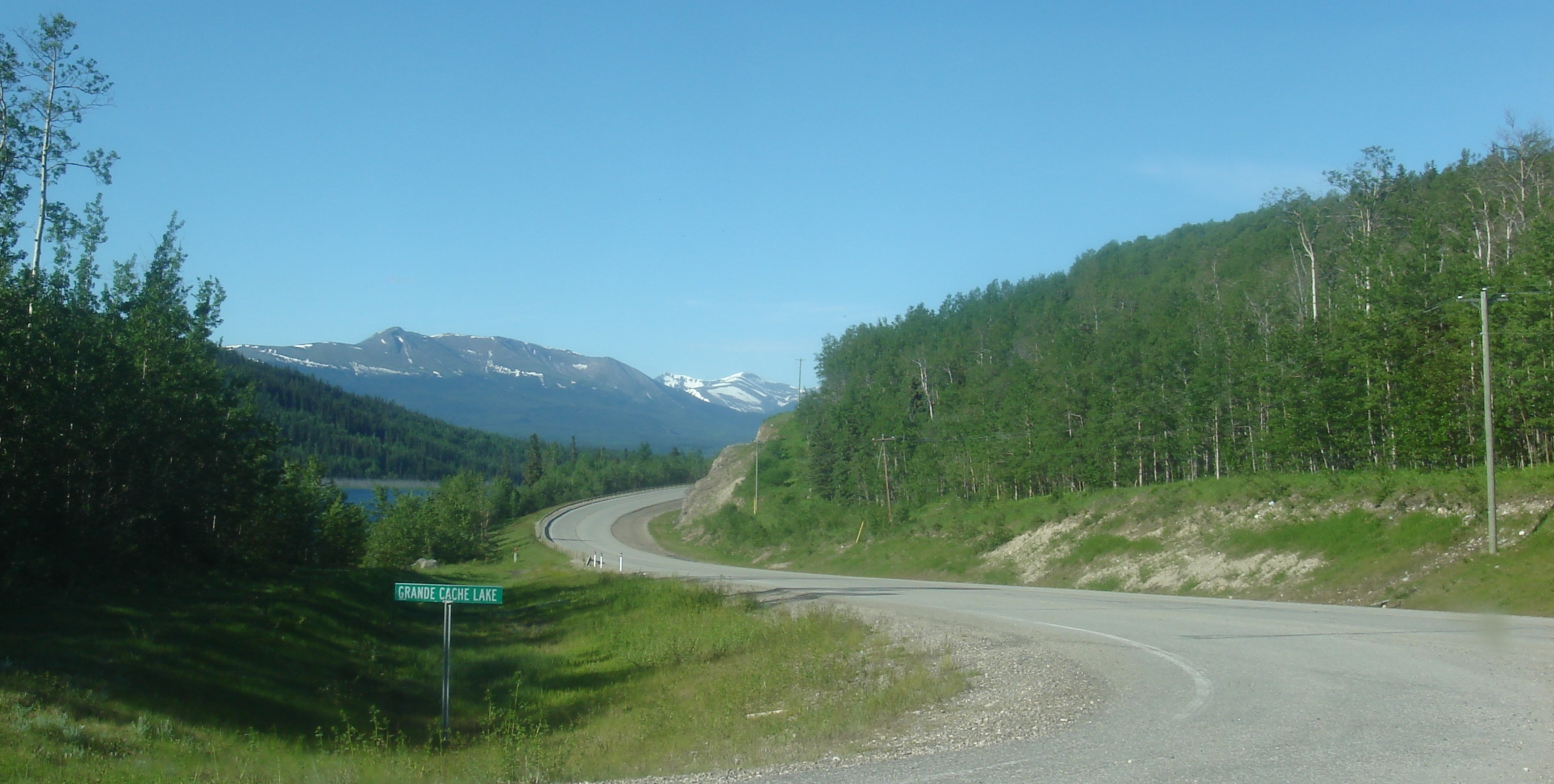
Bighorn Highway, westbound, east of Grande Cache

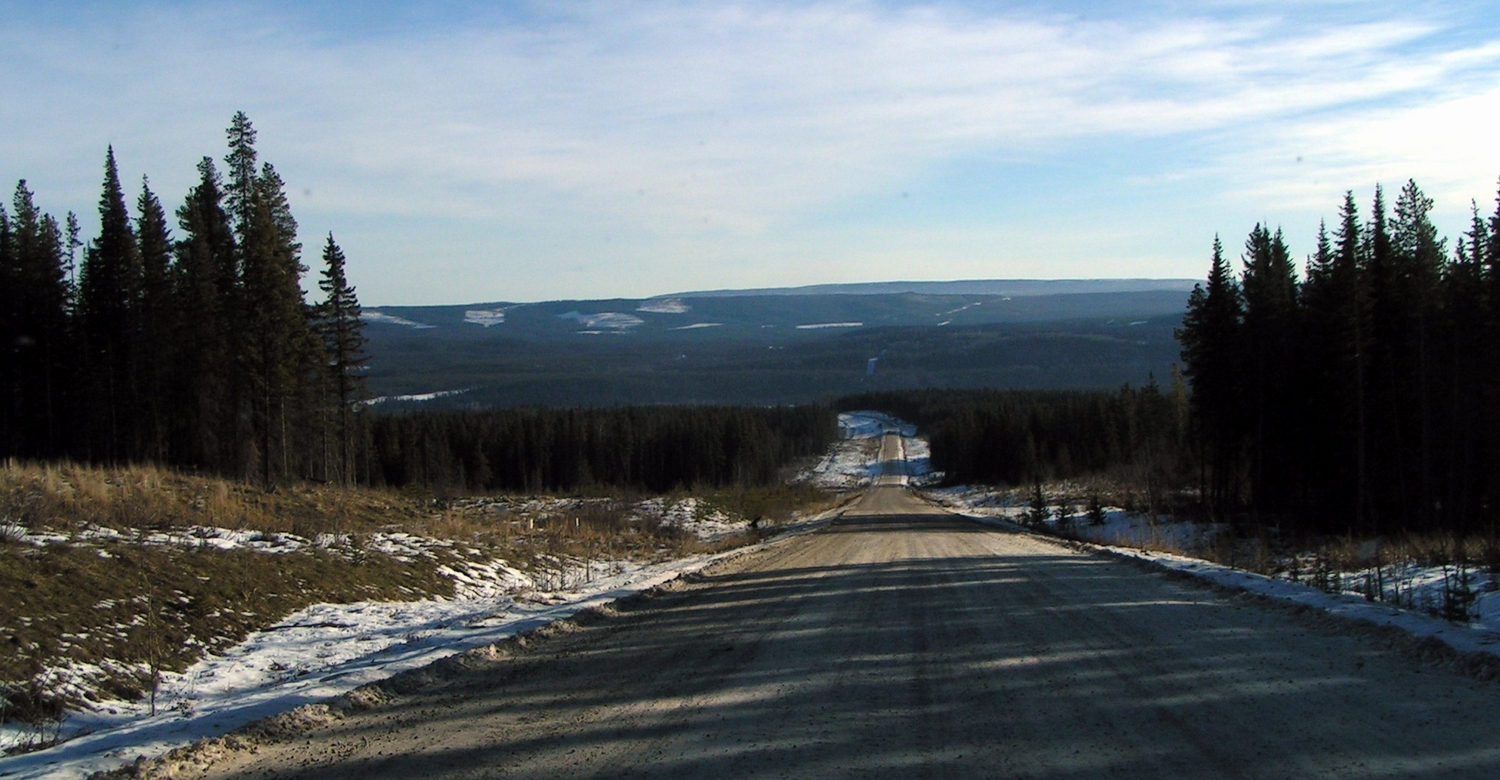
Highway 734 through the Foothills, southbound, north of Nordegg

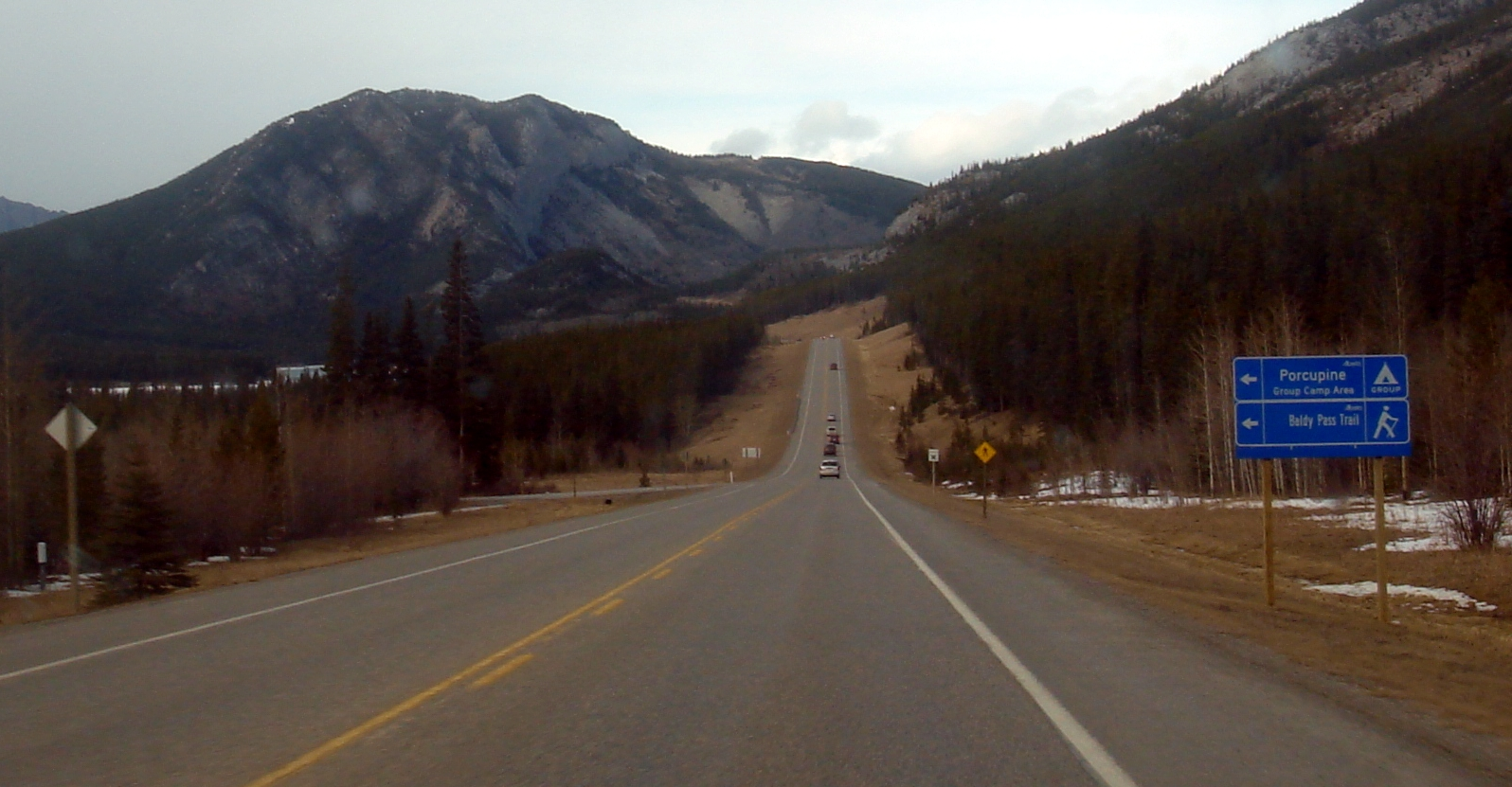
Kananaskis Trail, southbound through the Canadian Rockies in Kananaskis Country

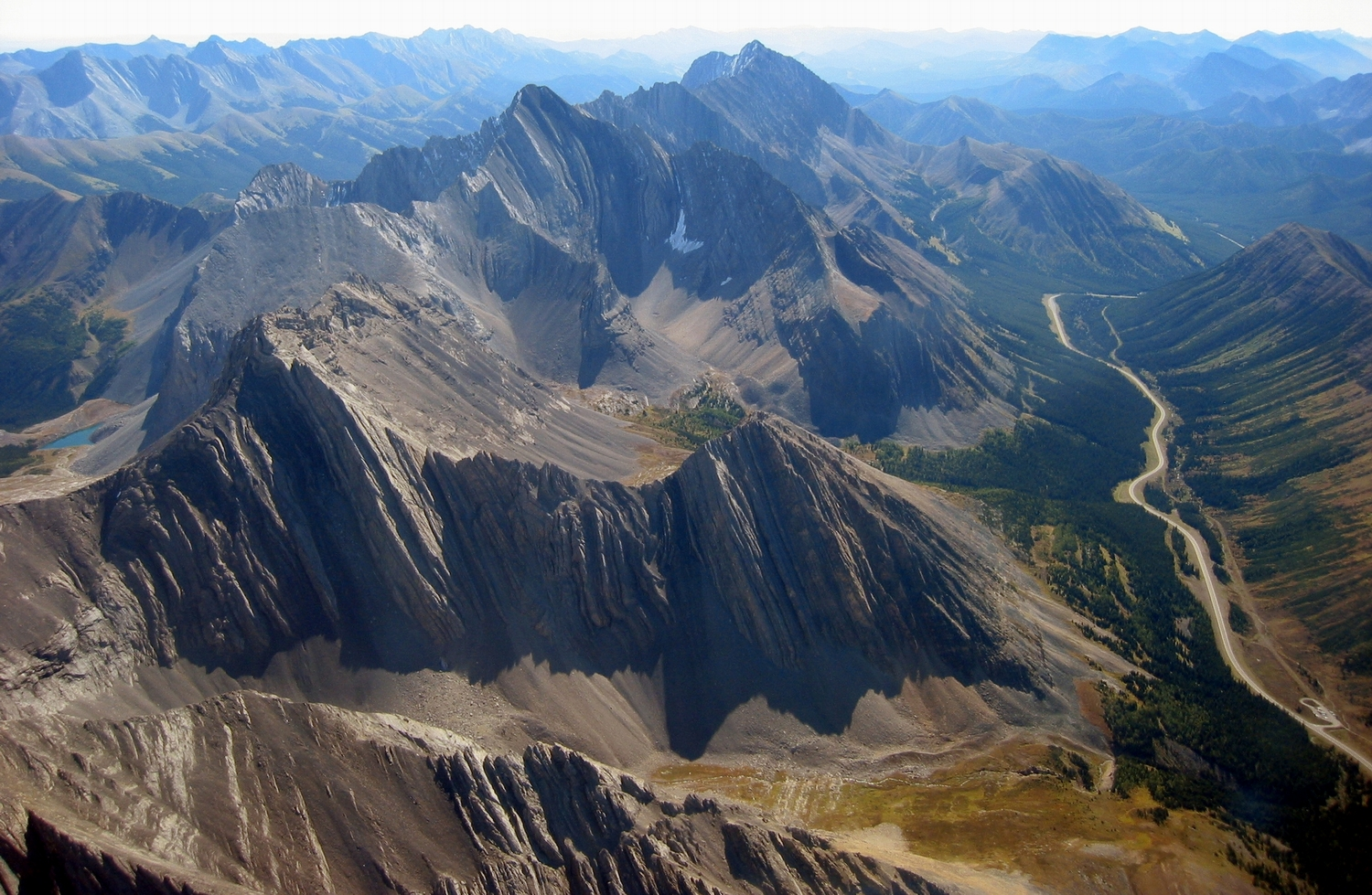
Kananaskis Trail at Highwood Pass
