= Goodwin, Alberta =

Coordinates: 55.2167°N 118.18596°W

Location of Goodwin, Alberta

Goodwin is a small, unincorporated rural locality in Northwestern Alberta Canada. Goodwin was the name of local cattlemen in the 1920s.

== Geography ==
Goodwin is located in the Municipal District of Greenview No. 16, which is 47 kilometres (29 mi) east of Grande Prairie and 410 kilometres (250 mi) north of Edmonton. Goodwin has an elevation of 659 meters ( ~ 2,160 ft).

The locality is positioned near the intersection of Alberta Highway 43 and the northern terminus of Secondary Highway 734 (also known as Goodwin Corner), which connects southward to Highway 40, the Forestry Trunk Road.
