= Chain Lakes, Alberta =

North Chain Lake
- Location within Alberta
- Location: Ponoka County, Alberta
- Coordinates: 52°36′44.28″N 113°27′50.74″W
- Type: Lake
- Primary inflows: Parlby Creek
- Primary outflows: Parlby Creek
- Basin countries: Canada

Middle Chain Lake
- Location within Alberta
- Location: Ponoka County, Alberta
- Coordinates: 52°35′1.15″N 113°26′29.01″W
- Type: Lake
- Primary inflows: Parlby Creek
- Primary outflows: Parlby Creek
- Basin countries: Canada

Magee Lake
- Location within Alberta
- Location: Lacombe County, Alberta
- Coordinates: 52°33′39.08″N 113°23′5.07″W
- Type: Lake
- Primary inflows: Parlby Creek
- Primary outflows: Parlby Creek
- Basin countries: Canada

The Chain Lakes are a series of three lakes located north of Clive in the Canadian province of Alberta. These lakes are connected by Parlby Creek, which provides inflow and outflow for all three lakes. The main sportfish in the three lakes are Northern Pike, although Yellow Perch have been caught in the lakes. The lakes are located in Ponoka County, Alberta and Lacombe County, Alberta, and are located southeast of Ponoka and northwest of Lacombe. Red Deer, Nelson lake, and Gadsby lake are not located far from Chain lakes. Parlby creek, which provides inflow and outflow to all of the lakes, eventually flows into Spotted lake, Buffalo Lake, and lies in the Red Deer River basin even though it is located closer to the Battle River.

== North Chain Lake ==
North Chain lake is the northernmost of the series of lakes. It is located in Ponoka County, Alberta. Parlby Creek flows into the lake from the north, and it flows out of numerous smaller lakes. It is crossed by roads including Township Road 432, Alberta Highway 53, and Township Road 424 before flowing into the north side of lake. The lake is the smallest in size of the three lakes and the narrowest, with the narrowest part being located in the centre of the lake. Range Road 250 provides an access point and small recreation area maintained by Ponoka County on the eastern shore of the lake, while Township Road 422 and Range Road 245A pass near the lake. Parlby creek also flows out of the southern tip of lake.

== Middle Chain Lake ==
Middle Chain lake is located between North Chain Lake and Magee Lake. It is located in Ponoka County, Alberta, and is the longest of the three lakes. Parlby Creek flows out of North Chain Lake and is crossed by Range Road 245A before flowing into the north side of the lake. An unnamed offshoot road of Township Road 420 provides access to Chain Lakes Park on the western shore of the lake, which is maintained by Ponoka County. A decommissioned road that continues the northern section of Range Road 245 provides difficult access on the eastern shore of the lake. An offshoot of Range Road 250A, Township Road 415A, and the southern section of Range Road 245, all both pass near the lake. Parlby Creek also flows out of the southern tip of the lake.

== Magee Lake (South Chain Lake) ==
Magee Lake or South Chain lake is the southernmost of the series of lakes. It is the only one located in Lacombe County, Alberta, and it is the widest of the three lakes. Parlby Creek flows out of Middle Chain Lake, passes through the Magee Lake Natural Area (which is located near the lake) and is crossed by Range Road 244 before flowing into the north side of the lake. Township Road 414A provides access to a small recreation area maintained by Lacombe County on the western side of the lake. Township Road 414A also provides difficult access to the eastern side of the lake. Range Road 243, Township Road 414, and Range Road 242, all pass near the lake. Parlby Creek flows out of the southern side of the lake and is crossed by Township Road 413.
