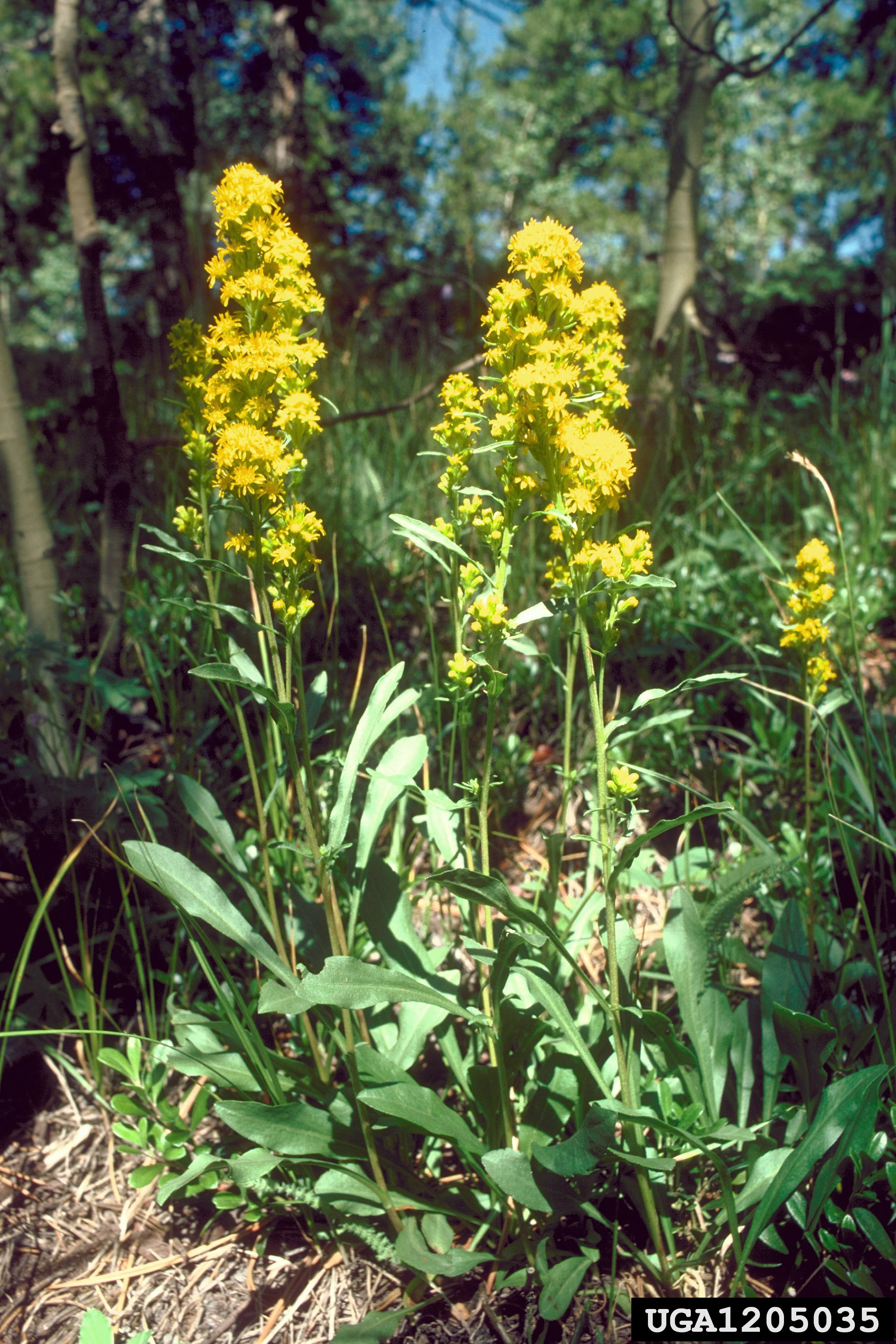

Conservation status
- Secure (NatureServe)

Scientific classification
- Kingdom: Plantae
- Clade: Tracheophytes
- Clade: Angiosperms
- Clade: Eudicots
- Clade: Asterids
- Order: Asterales
- Family: Asteraceae
- Genus: Solidago
- Species: S. multiradiata

Binomial name
- Solidago multiradiata Aiton

Synonyms
- Aster multiradiatus (Aiton) Kuntze; Solidago algida Piper; Solidago cusickii Piper; Solidago dilatata A. Nelson; Solidago heterophylla Nuttall; Solidago rubra Rydberg

= Solidago multiradiata =

Species of flowering plant

Solidago multiradiata is a species of goldenrod known by the common names Rocky Mountain goldenrod, northern goldenrod, and alpine goldenrod. It is native to North America, where it can be found throughout the northern regions, including Alaska and most of Canada (all three territories plus every province except Prince Edward Island, in addition to territory north of the Arctic Circle.) Its distribution extends through the western United States as far south as Arizona, New Mexico, and California. It is known from the subalpine and alpine climates of high mountain ranges. Its habitat includes tundra and mountain meadows.

This is a perennial herb producing one or more decumbent or upright stems from a branching caudex. The stems vary in maximum length or upright height from 3 to 80 centimeters. The leaves are lance-shaped or linear, sometimes narrowing quite a bit at the bases to become spoon- or spatula-shaped. They measure up to 20 centimeters long at the base of the plant, and are smaller higher up the stem. They are mostly hairless, but may have hairs lining the toothed or serrated edges. The inflorescence is a cluster of several flower heads, with clusters containing up to 100 heads. Every flower head contains many yellow disc florets and narrow yellow ray florets each 3 or 4 millimeters long. The fruit is an achene a few millimeters in length. It is coated in rough hairs and usually has a pappus on the tip.

The plant has been noted to be among the first species to resprout after oil spills in Alaska. It is used there for revegetation projects.
