= Water Valley, Alberta =

Water Valley
- Unincorporated community
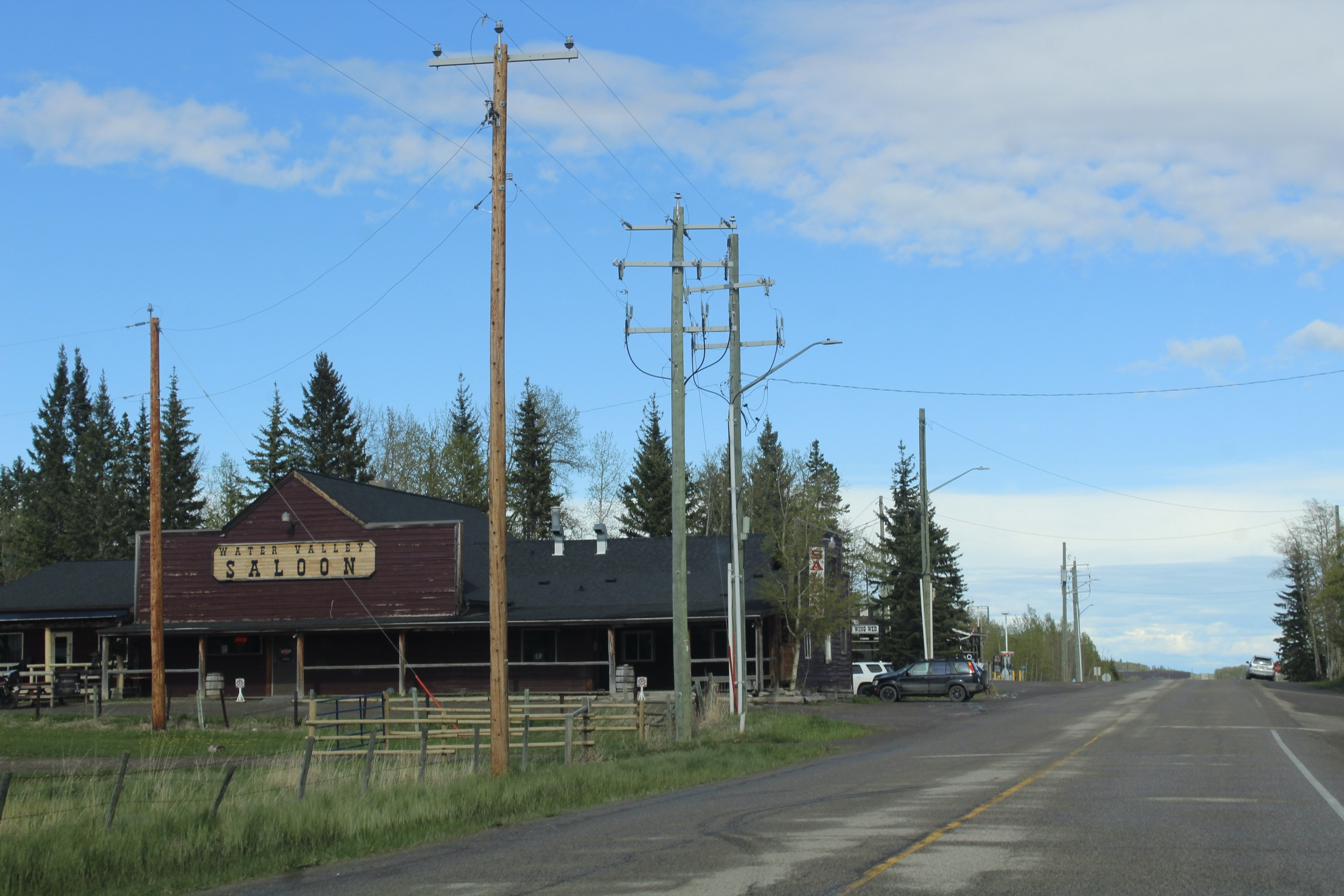

- Location within Alberta
- Coordinates: 51°30′14.0″N 114°36′39.4″W
- Country: Canada
- Province: Alberta
- Region: Southern Alberta
- Census division: 6
- Municipal district: Mountain View County
- Postal code: T0M 2E0
- Highways: Highway 579

Water Valley is an unincorporated community within Mountain View County, Alberta, Canada. Situated amongst the foothills of the Canadian Rockies, Water Valley is approximately 83 kilometres (52 mi) from the City of Calgary, along Highway 579 west of Highway 22 (Cowboy Trail). Water Valley boasts a small, but thriving commercial sector, along with a number of permanent residents, and is situated close to Winchell Lake, the Little Red Deer River and the Water Valley Golf Course.

Water Valley is also included within the Water Valley / Winchell Lake Rural Neighbourhood of Mountain View County.
